= List of Utah writers =

This is a list of Utah writers.

== A ==
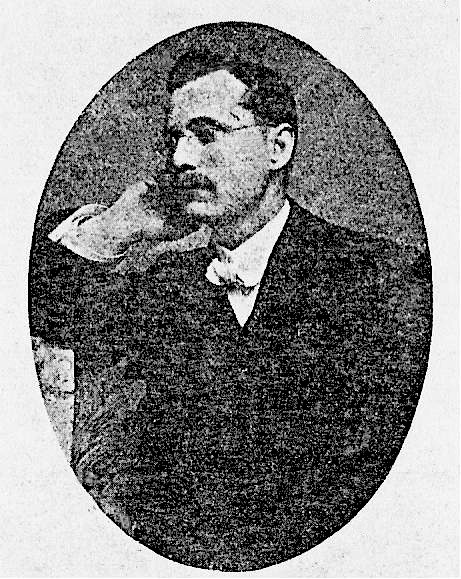
Nephi Anderson

- Edward Abbey (1927–1989) – environmental fiction and nonfiction
- Thomas G. Alexander (born 1935) – history
- James B. Allen (born 1927) – history
- Jack Anderson (1922–2005) – journalism, nonfiction
- Nephi Anderson (1865–1923) – religious/family values fiction
- Leonard J. Arrington (1917–1999) – history, nonfiction
- Montgomery Atwater (1904–1976) – nonfiction and youth fiction

== B ==
- Will Bagley (1950–2021) – history, nonfiction
- Paul Dayton Bailey (1906–1987) – history, nonfiction
- Roseanne Barr (born 1952) – screenplays
- Rick Bass (born 1958) – fiction, nonfiction
- Ken Brewer (1941–2006) – poetry, nonfiction
- Fawn M. Brodie (1915–1981) – history, nonfiction
- Juanita Brooks (1898–1989) – history, nonfiction
- John Brown (born 1966) – fantasy, thrillers, science fiction
- Marilyn Brown (born 1938) – religious fiction, poetry, nonfiction
- Jan Harold Brunvand (born 1933) – folklore, nonfiction
- D. J. Butler – fantasy, science fiction, horror, juvenile, young adult

== C ==
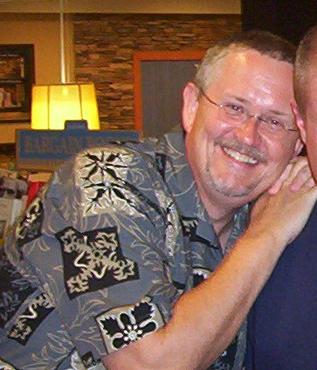
Orson Scott Card

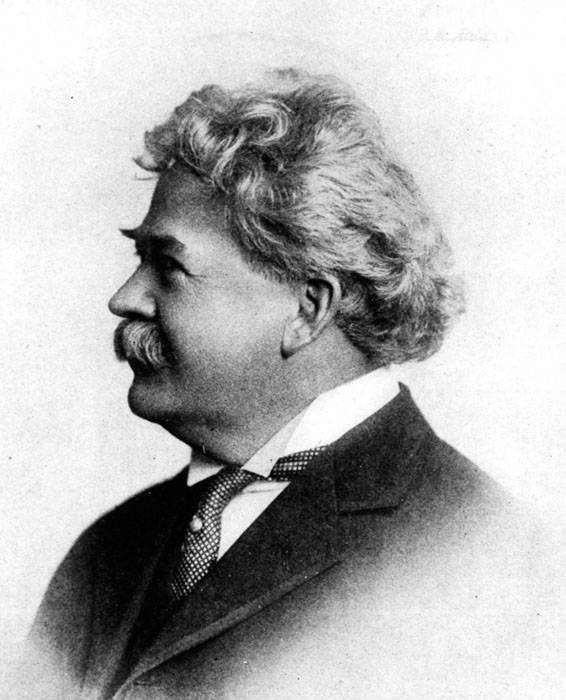
Frank J. Cannon

- Frank J. Cannon (1859–1933) – journalism, nonfiction
- Orson Scott Card (born 1951) – science fiction, fantasy, horror, historical fiction, nonfiction
- Ron Carlson (born 1969) – literary fiction, young adult, poetry, nonfiction
- Nathan Keonaona Chai – literary fiction, screenplays
- John Cheever (1912–1982) – literary fiction
- Clayton M. Christensen (1952–2020) – business, nonfiction
- Katharine Coles – poetry
- Ally Condie (born 1978) – science fiction, fantasy, young adult, juvenile
- Arianne Cope – religious fiction, historical fiction, nonfiction
- Larry Correia (born 1977) – urban fantasy, science fiction
- Stephen Covey (1932–2012) – self-help, business, nonfiction

== D ==
- James Dashner (born 1972) – science fiction, fantasy, juvenile
- Bernard DeVoto (1897–1955) – history, nonfiction
- Howard R. Driggs (1873–1963) – historical fiction, nonfiction
- H. Wayne Driggs (1902–1951) – playwright
- Brian Lee Durfee – epic fantasy, horror

== E ==
- Richard Paul Evans (born 1962) – religious fiction, science fiction
- Brian Evenson (born 1966) – literary fiction, horror, nonfiction

== F ==
- Linnie Findlay (1919–2009) – history, nonfiction
- Vardis Fisher (1895–1968) – historical fiction
- John D. Fitzgerald (1906–1988) – humor, slice-of-life, nonfiction
- Becca Fitzpatrick (born 1979) – fantasy
- Nancy Fulda – science fiction, science, nonfiction
- John Fulton (born 1967) – literary fiction

== G ==
- Susa Young Gates (1856–1933) – historical fiction, biographies, nonfiction
- Paul Genesse (born 1973) – fantasy, science fiction, horror
- Jessica Day George (born 1976) – fantasy, juvenile, young adult
- Brewster Ghiselin (1903–2002) – poetry, nonfiction
- James Goldberg – poetry, nonfiction, fantasy, historical fiction, general fiction, playwright

== H ==
- Nathan Hale (born 1976) – children's books, non-fiction
- Shannon Hale (born 1974) – fantasy, science fiction, juvenile, young adult
- Mette Ivie Harrison (born 1970) – fantasy, young adult, mystery, nonfiction
- Laura Hickman (born 1956) – fantasy, science fiction, game scenarios
- Tracy Hickman (born 1955) – fantasy, science fiction, game scenarios
- Charlie Holmberg (born 1988) – fantasy, romance, young adult
- Dean Hughes (born 1943) – historical fiction, juvenile fiction

== I ==
- Chris Ireland – science, medicine, nonfiction
- Reed Irvine (1922–2004) – economics, nonfiction
- Wilton Ivie (1907–1969) – science, biology, nonfiction
- Janet Iwasa – science, nonfiction
- Reed McNeil Izatt (1926–2023) – science, nonfiction

== J ==
- Janet Kay Jensen (born 1951) – literary fiction
- Raymond F. Jones (1915–1994) – science fiction

== K ==
- Ardyth Kennelly (1912–2005) – pulp romance, historical fiction, poetry, nonfiction
- Josi S. Kilpack (born 1974) – mystery, historical romance, literary fiction

== L ==
- Neil LaBute (born 1963) – screenplays
- Annette Lyon (born 1973) – religious fiction, romance, nonfiction

== M ==
- Maddox (George Ouzounian; born 1978) – humor, nonfiction
- Susan Evans McCloud (born 1945) – songwriter, historical fiction, biographies, screenwriter
- Ellen Meloy (1946–2004)
- James Merendino (born 1969) – screenplays
- L. E. Modesitt, Jr. (born 1943) fantasy, science fiction, poetry, non-fiction
- Adrienne Monson (born 1983) – paranormal romance, urban fantasy
- Thomas S. Monson (1927–2018) – religious nonfiction, inspirational nonfiction, history
- Heather B. Moore – romance fiction, thriller, fantasy, historical fiction, religious fiction
- Dale Morgan (1914–1971) – history, nonfiction
- Brandon Mull (born 1974) – fantasy, juvenile

== N ==
- Jennifer A. Nielsen (born 1971) – historical fiction, young adult, fantasy
- Brenda Novak (born 1964) – historical romance, contemporary romance
- Rachel Ann Nunes (born 1966) – literary fiction, romance, religious fiction

== O ==
- Peter Orullian – fantasy, religious fiction, songwriter

== P ==
- Helen Z. Papanikolas (1917–2004) – history, literary fiction, nonfiction
- Jay A. Parry (born 1950) – literary fiction, science fiction, poetry, religious fiction, self-help, nonfiction
- Steven L. Peck (born 1957) – poetry, religious fiction, science, science fiction, fantasy, nonfiction
- Todd Robert Petersen (born 1969) – literary fiction, satire, nonfiction
- Levi S. Peterson (born 1933) – biographies, nonfiction, literary fiction
- Aprilynne Pike (born 1981) – fantasy, young adult
- Louise Plummer – juvenile, nonfiction

== Q ==
- D. Michael Quinn (1944–2021) – history, nonfiction

== R ==
- Natacha Rambova (1897–1966) – nonfiction, biographies
- James E. Reilly (1948–2008) – screenplays
- Jeff Rivera (born 1976) – contemporary fiction, young adult
- B. H. Roberts (1857–1933) – history, nonfiction
- Peter Rock (born 1967) – literary fiction

== S ==
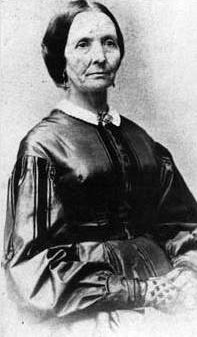
Eliza Snow

- Eric Samuelsen (1956–2019) – theatrical plays
- Brandon Sanderson (born 1975) – fantasy, science fiction
- Joseph Santley (1889–1991) – theatrical plays
- Ronald B. Scott (1945–2020) – biographies, journalism, nonfiction
- Brent Scowcroft (1925–2020) – politics, nonfiction
- Richard Scowcroft (1916–2001) – historical fiction, literary fiction
- Cosy Sheridan (born 1964) – songwriter
- Elizabeth Smart (born 1987) – nonfiction, biographies
- Eliza R. Snow (1804–1887) – poetry, nonfiction
- Dorothy Allred Solomon (born 1949) – memoir, creative nonfiction, essays, and fiction
- Virginia Sorensen (1912–1991) – religious fiction, historical fiction
- Anita Stansfield (born 1961) – contemporary romance, historical romance
- Page Stegner (1937–2017) – historical fiction, history, nonfiction
- Wallace Stegner (1909–1993) – religious fiction, history, nonfiction
- Mark Strand (1934–2014) – poetry, nonfiction
- Eric G. Swedin – science fiction, alternate history, nonfiction
- May Swenson (1913–1989) – theatrical plays, poetry, nonfiction

== T ==
- Howard Tayler (born 1968) – cartoonist, science fiction
- Sandra Tayler (born 1973) – fantasy, science fiction, nonfiction
- Samuel W. Taylor (1907–1997) – scriptwriter, history, religious fiction, contemporary fiction, humorous fiction
- Douglas Thayer (1929–2017) – juvenile, religious fiction, biographies
- Emma Lou Thayne (1924–2014) – poetry, historical fiction, songwriter, biographies
- Melanie Rae Thon (born 1957) – literary fiction
- Wallace Thurman (1902–1934) – literary fiction
- David Trottier (born 1949) – screenplays
- Edward Tullidge (1829–1894) – history, nonfiction
- Michael O. Tunnell (born 1950) – juvenile, religious fiction, nonfiction

== U ==
- Cornelia Ulrich (born 1967) – science, nonfiction
- Grant Underwood (born 1954) – history, religion, nonfiction

== V ==
- Richard S. Van Wagoner (1946–2010) – history
- Suresh Venkatasubramanian – computer science, nonfiction
- Anil Virkar – science, engineering, nonfiction
- Joseph Vogel – politics, nonfiction
- J. Frederic Voros Jr. – songwriter, religious nonfiction, juvenile

== W ==
Dan Willis

Anne Wingate

- Dan Wells (born 1977) – horror, fantasy, science fiction, thriller, young adult
- Robison Wells (born 1978) – science fiction, thriller, young adult
- Maurine Whipple (1903–1992) – religious fiction, historical fiction, history, nonfiction
- Tyler Whitesides (born 1987) – fantasy, juvenile
- Carol Lynch Williams (born 1959) – juvenile, young adult, fantasy, religious fiction
- Terry Tempest Williams (born 1955) – nature, nonfiction
- Dan Willis (born 1967) – fantasy, young adult
- Michael K. Winder (born 1976) – politics, nonfiction
- Anne Wingate (1943–2021) – mystery, fantasy, romance fiction
- Dave Wolverton (1957–2022, also writes as David Farland) – science fiction, fantasy, juvenile, young adult, historical fiction

== Y ==
- Blaine Yorgason (born 1942) – contemporary fiction, religious fiction, biographies, nonfiction
- Brenton G. Yorgason (1945–2016) – contemporary fiction, religious fiction, nonfiction
- Bryan Young (born 1980) – fantasy, juvenile
- Margaret Blair Young (born 1955) – historical fiction, literary fiction, scriptwriter

== Z ==
- Sara Zarr (born 1970) – young adult fiction, literary fiction
