= Whitney Awards =

Awards for fiction by Latter-day Saint authors

The Whitney Awards are awards given annually for novels by LDS authors. Established in 2007, they are named after Orson F. Whitney, a prominent early member of the LDS Church. There are several categories for which novels may be nominated. The Whitney Awards are a semi-independent non-profit organization affiliated with the LDStorymakers, a guild for LDS authors.

== Categories ==
Due to the limited number of titles released by LDS authors, several of the genre awards have been combined (such as romance and women's fiction).

As of 2014, there are eight genre categories:

Adult

- Romance
- Mystery/Suspense
- Speculative
- Historical
- General

Youth

- Youth General
- Youth Speculative
- Middle Grade

There are also two special awards:

- Best Novel by a New Author
- Novel of the Year

The Whitney Committee states that it is unlikely that other areas of LDS art—such as music, poetry, or non-fiction books—will be added to the categories.

== Process ==
To be eligible, a novel must be written by an LDS author during the award year, and be at least 50,000 words long. Any reader can nominate a book. Once a book has received five or more nominations, it becomes an official nominee. The official nominees are presented to the Whitney Awards Committee which checks for eligibility and acts as a preliminary judging panel, reducing the number of nominees to no more than five per category.

Finally, ballots are sent to the Whitney Awards Academy, an invitation-only group consisting of authors, bookstore owners/managers, distributors, critics, and other industry professionals. By a popular vote, they decide on the winners. The awards are presented at a dinner held at the conclusion of the annual LDStorymakers conference and writing "boot camp."

Until the 2010 awards (presented 2011), books were not allowed to win in more than one category.

== Name ==
The awards are named after Orson F. Whitney, a member of the Quorum of the Twelve Apostles in the Church of Jesus Christ of Latter-day Saints as well as a poet and writer. In 1888, Elder Whitney delivered a speech entitled "Home Literature" in which he stated:

We will yet have Miltons and Shakespeares of our own. God's ammunition is not exhausted. His brightest spirits are held in reserve for the latter times. In God's name and by his help we will build up a literature whose top shall touch heaven, though its foundations may now be low in earth.

The phrase "We will yet have Miltons and Shakespeares of our own" has been adopted as the slogan of the Whitney Awards, and is printed on the trophy.

== Winners and finalists 2007 - present ==
2007 (presented March 22, 2008)
Best Novel of the Year	Best Y/A Children's
Winner: On the Road to Heaven, by Coke Newell — Zarahemla Books Other finalists: Dragon Slippers, by Jessica Day George — Bloomsbury; Out of Jerusalem: Land of Inheritance, by H.B. Moore — Covenant Communications; The Operative, by Willard Boyd Gardner — Covenant Communications; Upon the Mountains, by Gale Sears — Covenant Communications	Winner: Fablehaven 2: Rise of the Evening Star, by Brandon Mull — Shadow Mountain Other finalists: Alcatraz Versus the Evil Librarians, by Brandon Sanderson — Scholastic; Bullies in the Headlights, by Matthew Buckley (Marion Jensen)— Covenant Communications; How to Take the Ex Out of Ex-Boyfriend, by Janette Rallison — Putnam; First Day, by Ally Condie — Deseret Book
Best Novel by a New Author	Best Speculative
Winner: Dragon Slippers, by Jessica Day George — Bloomsbury Other finalists: Wet Desert, by Gary Hansen — Holeshot Press; Counting Stars, by Michele Paige Holmes — Covenant Communications; Beyond the Horizon, by Judy C. Olsen — Covenant Communications; On the Road to Heaven, by Coke Newell — Zarahemla Books	Winner: Book of a Thousand Days, by Shannon Hale — Bloomsbury Other finalists: Dragon Slippers, by Jessica Day George — Bloomsbury; Hunting Gideon, by Jessica Draper — Zarahemla Books; The Lights of Mahonri Moriancumer, by Phyllis Gunderson — Cedar Fort, Inc.; The Well of Ascension, by Brandon Sanderson — Tor
Best Romance/Women's Fiction	Best Historical
Winner: Counting Stars, by Michele Paige Holmes — Covenant Communications Other finalists: Desire of our Hearts, by Sariah S. Wilson — Covenant Communications; Eclipse, by Stephenie Meyer — Little, Brown; The Independence Club, by Rachel Ann Nunes — Deseret Book; Loyalty's Web, by Joyce DiPastena — iUniverse	Winner: Out of Jerusalem: Land of Inheritance, by H.B. Moore — Covenant Communications Other finalists: Beyond the Horizon, by Judy C. Olsen — Covenant Communications; On the Road to Heaven, by Coke Newell — Zarahemla Books; Spires of Stone, by Annette Lyon — Covenant Communications; Upon the Mountains, by Gale Sears — Covenant Communications
Best Mystery/Suspense	Lifetime Achievement
Winner: Sheep's Clothing, by Josi S. Kilpack — Deseret Book Other finalists: The Deep End, by Traci Hunter Abramson — Covenant Communications; Grave Secrets, by Marlene Austin — Covenant Communications; The Operative, by Willard Boyd Gardner — Covenant Communications; Hazardous Duty, by Betsy Brannon Green — Covenant Communications	Jennie Hansen; Dean Hughes; Anita Stansfield

2008 (presented April, 2009)
Best Novel of the Year	Best Youth Fiction
Winner: Traitor, by Sandra Grey Other finalists: Bound on Earth, by Angela Hallstrom; Fool Me Twice, by Stephanie Black; The Hero of Ages, by Brandon Sanderson; Sun and Moon, Ice and Snow, by Jessica Day George	Winner: The 13th Reality, by James Dashner Other finalists: Alcatraz vs. The Scrivner's Bones, by Brandon Sanderson; Fablehaven: Grip of the Shadow Plague, by Brandon Mull; Farworld: Water Keep, by Jeffrey Scott Savage; Sun and Moon, Ice and Snow, by Jessica Day George
Best Novel by a New Author	Best Speculative Fiction
Winner: Bound on Earth, by Angela Hallstrom Other finalists: The Reckoning, by Tanya Parker Mills; Spare Change, by Aubrey Mace; Traitor, by Sandra Grey; Waiting For the Light to Change, by Annette Hawes	Winner: The Hero of Ages, by Brandon Sanderson Other finalists: Ender in Exile, by Orson Scott Card; The Great and Terrible: From the End of Heaven, by Chris Stewart; The Host, by Stephenie Meyer; The Wyrmling Horde: The Seventh Book of the Runelords, by David Farland
Best Romance	Best Historical
Winner: Spare Change, by Aubrey Mace Other finalists: Seeking Persephone, by Sarah Eden; Servant to a King, by Sariah Wilson; The Sound of Rain, by Anita Stansfield; Taking Chances, by Shannon Guymon	Winner: Abinadi, by H. B. Moore Other finalists: Isabelle Webb, Legend of the Jewel, by N. C. Allen; Master, by Toni Sorenson; The Ruby, by Jennie Hansen; Traitor, by Sandra Grey
Best Mystery/Suspense	Best General Fiction
Winner: Fool Me Twice, by Stephanie Black Other finalists: Above and Beyond, by Betsy Brannon Green; Do No Harm, by Gregg Luke; Freefall, by Traci Hunter Abramson; Royal Target, by Traci Hunter Abramson	Winner: Waiting For the Light to Change, by Annette Haws Other finalists: Bound on Earth, by Angela Hallstrom; The Reckoning, by Tanya Parker Mills; Fields of Home, by Rachel Ann Nunes; Keeping Keller, by Tracy Winegar
Lifetime Achievement Awards
Kerry Blair; Orson Scott Card

2009 (presented April, 2010)
Best Novel of the Year	Best Youth Fiction
In the Company of Angels, by David Farland	Winner: The Chosen One, by Carol Lynch Williams Other finalists: Princess of the Midnight Ball, by Jessica Day George; Fablehaven: Secrets of the Dragon Sanctuary, by Brandon Mull; My Fair Godmother, by Janette Rallison; Bright Blue Miracle, by Becca Wilhite
Best Novel by a New Author (tie)	Best Speculative Fiction
Gravity vs. The Girl, by Riley Noehren; I Am Not a Serial Killer, by Dan Wells	Winner: Servant of a Dark God, by John Brown Other finalists: The Maze Runner, by James Dashner; Wings, by Aprilynne Pike; Warbreaker, by Brandon Sanderson; I Am Not a Serial Killer, by Dan Wells
Best Romance	Best Historical
Winner: Counting the Cost, by Liz Adair Other finalists: Illuminations of the Heart, by Joyce DiPastena; All The Stars in Heaven, by Michele Paige Holmes; Santa Maybe, by Aubrey Mace; Previously Engaged, by Elodia Strain	Winner: The Last Waltz, by G.G. Vandagriff Other finalists: Tribunal, by Sandra Grey; The Undaunted, by Gerald Lund; Alma, by H.B. Moore; In the Company of Angels, by David Farland
Best Mystery/Suspense	Best General Fiction
Winner: Methods of Madness, by Stephanie Black Other finalists: Lockdown, by Traci Hunter Abramson; Murder by the Book, by Betsy Brannon Green; Lemon Tart, by Josi S. Kilpack; Altered State, by Gregg Luke	Winner: Hotel on the Corner of Bitter and Sweet, by Jamie Ford Other finalists: No Going Back, by Jonathan Langford; Gravity vs. The Girl, by Riley Noehren; The Route, by Gale Sears; Eyes Like Mine, by Julie Wright
Lifetime Achievement Award	Outstanding Achievement Award
Gerald Lund	Dave Wolverton

2010 (presented May 7, 2011)
Best Novel of the Year (tie)	Best Youth Fiction – General
The Way of Kings, by Brandon Sanderson; Mr. Monster, by Dan Wells	Winner: The Healing Spell, by Kimberley Griffiths Little Other finalists: Glimpse, by Carol Lynch Williams; Missing In Action, by Dean Hughes; My Double Life, by Janette Rallison; Wolves, Boys, and Other Things That Might Kill Me, by Kristen Chandler
Best Novel by a New Author	Best Youth Fiction – Speculative
Paranormalcy, by Kiersten White	Winner: Matched, by Ally Condie Other finalists: Fablehaven 5, by Brandon Mull; Paranormalcy, by Kiersten White; The Forbidden Sea, by Sheila Nielson; The Fourth Nephite, by Jeffrey Scott Savage
Best Romance	Best Speculative Fiction
Winner: Cross My Heart, by Julie Wright Other finalists: Courting Miss Lancaster, by Sarah M. Eden; The Legend of Shannonderry, by Carol Warburton; Luck of the Draw, by Rachael Renee Anderson; Meg's Melody, by Kaylee Baldwin	Winner: The Way of Kings, by Brandon Sanderson Other finalists: Imprints, by Rachel Ann Nunes; Mr. Monster, by Dan Wells; Pathfinder, by Orson Scott Card; The Scorch Trials, by James Dashner
Best Mystery/Suspense	Best Historical
Winner: Cold As Ice, by Stephanie Black Other finalists: Crossfire, by Traci Hunter Abramson; Murder by Design, by Betsy Brannon Green; A Time to Die, by Jeffrey Scott Savage; Wrong Number, by Rachelle J. Christensen	Winner: Trespass, by Sandra Grey Other finalists: Alma The Younger, by H.B. Moore; Oh Say Can You See?, by L.C. Lewis; The Sheen on the Silk, by Anne Perry; The Silence of God, by Gale Sears
Best General Fiction
Winner: Band of Sisters, by Annette Lyon Other finalists: Blink of an Eye, by Gregg Luke; The Cross Gardener, by Jason F. Wright; Finding Mercie, by Blaine Yorgason; Lucky Change, by Susan Law Corpany

2011 (presented May 5, 2012)
Best Novel of the Year	Best Novel by a New Author
I Don't Want to Kill You, by Dan Wells	With a Name Like Love, by Tess Hilmo
Outstanding Achievement Award	Lifetime Achievement Award
Jack Weyland	Doug Thayer
Best Romance	Best Speculative Fiction
Winner: Borrowed Light, by Carla Kelly Other finalists: Count Down to Love, by Julie N. Ford; Captive Heart, by Michele Paige Holmes; The List, by Melanie Jacobson; Not My Type, by Melanie Jacobson	Winner: The Alloy of Law: A Mistborn Novel, by Brandon Sanderson Other finalists: The Lost Gate, by Orson Scott Card; No Angel, by Theresa Sneed; I Don't Want to Kill You, by Dan Wells; A Night of Blacker Darkness, by Dan Wells
Best Mystery/Suspense	Best Historical
Winner: Rearview Mirror, by Stephanie Black Other finalists: Smokescreen, by Traci Hunter Abramson; If I Should Die, by Jennie Hansen; Bloodborne, by Gregg Luke; Acceptable Loss, by Anne Perry**	Winner: Letters in the Jade Dragon Box by Gale Sears Other finalists: Daughter of Helaman, by Misty Moncur; Fires of Jerusalem, by Marilyn Brown; Isabelle Webb: The Pharaoh's Daughter, by N.C. Allen; Miss Delacourt Has Her Day, by Heidi Ashworth
Best Youth Fiction – General	Best General Fiction
Winner: With a Name like Love, by Tess Hilmo Other finalists: Girls Don't Fly, by Kristen Chandler; Pride & Popularity, by Jenni James; Sean Griswold's Head, by Lindsey Leavitt; Miles from Ordinary, by Carol Lynch Williams	Winner: Before I Say Goodbye, by Rachel Ann Nunes Other finalists: The Walk: Miles to Go, by Richard Paul Evans; Evolution of Thomas Hall, by Kieth Merrill; Gifted, by Karey White; The Wedding Letters, by Jason F. Wright
Best Youth Fiction – Speculative
Winner: Variant, by Robison Wells Other finalists: Tuesdays at the Castle, by Jessica Day George; Slayers, by C.J. Hill; My Unfair Godmother, by Janette Rallison; Shifting, by Bethany Wiggins

2012 (presented May 11, 2013)
General	Young Adult – Speculative
Winner:The Rent Collector by Camron Wright Other finalists: Dancing on Broken Glass by Ka Hancock; Paige by Annette Lyon; The 13th Day of Christmas by Jason F. Wright; A Night on Moon Hill by Tanya Parker Mills	Winner: Everneath by Brodi Ashton Other finalists: Destined by Aprilynne Pike; Demons by Heather Frost; Endlessly by Kiersten White; Feedback by Robison Wells
Historical	Young Adult – General
Winner: My Loving Vigil Keeping by Carla Kelly Other finalists: Espionage by A. L. Sowards; Within the Dark Hills by Sian Ann Bessey; Spinster's Folly by Marsha Ward; The Five Books of Jesus by James Goldberg	Winner: After Hello by Lisa Mangum Other finalists: Finding June by Shannen Crane Camp; The Space Between Us by Jessica Martinez; The Ugly Stepsister Strikes Back by Sariah Wilson; V is for Virgin by Kelly Oram
Romance	Middle Grade
Winner: Edenbrooke by Julianne Donaldson Other finalists: Lady Outlaw by Stacy Henrie; Of Grace and Chocolate by Krista Lynne Jensen; Smart Move by Melanie Jacobson; Twitterpated by Melanie Jacobson	Winner: The False Prince by Jennifer A. Nielsen Other finalists: Case File 13: Zombie Kid by Jeffrey Scott Savage; Epic Tales of a Misfit Hero by Matt Peterson; Freakling by Lana Krumwiede; Palace of Stone by Shannon Hale
Best Mystery/Suspense	Best Novel by New Author
Winner: Code Word by Traci Hunter Abramson Other finalists: Banana Split by Josi S. Kilpack; Deadly Undertakings by Gregg Luke; Line of Fire by Rachel Ann Nunes; Tres Leches Cupcakes by Josi S. Kilpack	Winner: Edenbrooke by Julianne Donaldson Other finalists: Dancing on Broken Glass by Ka Hancock; The Five Books of Jesus by James Goldberg; Lady Outlaw by Stacy Henrie; Edenbrooke by Julianne Donaldson; Everneath by Brodi Ashton; Espionage by A.L. Sowards; Freakling by Lana Krumwiede; The Epic Tales of a Misfit Hero by Matt Peterson; Of Grace and Chocolate by Krista Lynne Jensen
Speculative	Best Novel of the Year
Winner: The Hollow City by Dan Wells Other finalists: City of the Saints by D. J. Butler; Flight From Blithmore by Jacob Gowans; Earthbound by Theresa Sneed; The Penitent by C. David Belt	The Rent Collector by Camron Wright
Best Novel in Youth Fiction
The False Prince by Jennifer A. Nielsen
Outstanding Achievement Award	Lifetime Achievement Award
Carol Lynch Williams	Lael Littke

2013
General	Young Adult – General
Winner: Mile 21 by Sarah Dunster Other finalists: Love Letters of the Angels of Death by Jennifer Quist; Road to Bountiful by Donald Smurthwaite; Ruby's Secret by Heather B. Moore; The House at Rose Creek by Jenny Proctor	Winner: All the Truth That's in Me by Julie Berry Other finalists: Chasing June by Shannen Crane Camp; Dead Girls Don't Lie by Jennifer Shaw Wolf; Going Vintage by Lindsey Leavitt; The Distance Between Us by Kasie West
Historical	Middle Grade
Winner: Esther the Queen by Heather B. Moore Other finalists: Belonging to Heaven by Gale Sears; Safe Passage by Carla Kelly; The Mounds Anomaly by Phyllis Gunderson; Where the River Once Flowed by Jennie Hansen	Winner: The Runaway King by Jennifer A. Nielsen Other finalists: Cragbridge Hall: The Inventor's Secret by Chad Morris; RUMP: The True Story of Rumplestilskin by Liesel Shurtliff; Sky Jumpers by Peggy Eddleman; Wednesdays in the Tower by Jessica Day George
Romance	Best Novel by New Author
Winner: Blackmoore by Julianne Donaldson Other finalists: Hearth Fires by Dorothy Keddington; Longing for Home by Sarah M. Eden; Second Chances by Melanie Jacobson; The Orchard by Krista Lynne Jensen	Winner: Pivot Point by Kasie West Other finalists: The House at Rose Creek by Jenny Proctor; I, Spy by Jordan McCollum; Insomnia by J. R. Johansson; Cragbridge Hall: The Inventor's Secret by Chad Morris; RUMP: The True Story of Rumplestilskin by Liesel Shurtliff; Sky Jumpers by Peggy Eddleman
Mystery/Suspense	Best Novel of the Year
Winner: Deep Cover by Traci Hunter Abramson Other finalists: Rocky Road by Josi S. Kilpack; I, Spy by Jordan McCollum; Finding Sheba by Heather B. Moore; Spy for a Spy by Jordan McCollum	Blackmoore by Julianne Donaldson
Speculative	Best Novel in Youth Fiction
Winner: Dark Memories by Jeffrey Scott Savage Other finalists: Echo in Time by C. J. Hill; Heart of the Ocean by Heather B. Moore; The Witnesses by Stephanie Black; Winter Queen by Amber Argyle	Steelheart by Brandon Sanderson
Young Adult – Speculative	Outstanding Achievement
Winner: Steelheart by Brandon Sanderson Other finalists: Friends and Traitors: Slayers 2 by C. J. Hill; Insomnia by J. R. Johansson; Pivot Point by Kasie West; Blackout by Robison Wells	Rachel Ann Nunes
Lifetime Achievement
Blaine Yorgason

2014
General	Young Adult – General
Winner: The Law of Moses by Amy Harmon Other finalists: A Plentiful Rain by Elizabeth Petty Bentley; My Name is Bryan by Stacy Lynn Carrol; Still Time by Maria Hoagland; Walking on Water by Richard Paul Evans	Winner: Death Coming up the Hill by Christopher E. Crowe Other finalists: Forbidden by Kimberley Griffiths Little; Kiss Kill Vanish by Jessica Martinez; Not in the Script by Amy Finnegan; On the Fence by Kasie West
Historical	Middle Grade
Winner: Softly Falling by Carla Kelly Other finalists: An Ocean atween Us by Angela Morrison; Deadly Alliance by A.L. Sowards; Eve: In the Beginning by H. B. Moore; Gone for a Soldier by Marsha Ward	Winner: Almost Super by Marion Jensen Other finalists: Sky Jumpers: The Forbidden Flats by Peggy Eddleman; The Scandalous Sisterhood of Prickwillow Place by Julie Berry; The Shadow Throne by Jennifer A. Nielsen; The Time of the Fireflies by Kimberley Griffiths Little
Romance	Best Novel by New Author
Winner: Longing for Home: Hope Springs by Sarah M. Eden Other finalists: Becoming Lady Lockwood by Jennifer Moore; Lady Emma's Campaign by Jennifer Moore; Painting Kisses by Melanie Jacobson; Spy by Night by Jordan McCollum	Winner: Becoming Lady Lockwood by Jennifer Moore Other finalists: Nameless: The Darkness Comes by Mercedes M. Yardley; Not in the Script by Amy Finnegan; Remake by Ilima Todd; The Accidental Apprentice by Anika Arrington
Mystery/Suspense	Best Novel of the Year
Winner: Wedding Cake by Josi S. Kilpack Other finalists: Blood on the Water by Anne Perry; Death on Blackheath by Anne Perry; Drop Zone by Traci Hunter Abramson; Tomorrow We Spy by Jordan McCollum	Longing for Home: Hope Springs by Sarah M. Eden
Speculative	Best Novel in Youth Fiction
Winner: Words of Radiance by Brandon Sanderson Other finalists: Nameless: The Darkness Comes by Mercedes M. Yardley; Pretty Little Dead Girls by Mercedes M. Yardley; The Accidental Apprentice by Anika Arrington; This Darkness Light by Michaelbrent Collings	The Scandalous Sisterhood of Prickwillow Place by Julie Berry
Young Adult – Speculative	Outstanding Achievement
Winner: Illusions of Fate by Kiersten White Other finalists: Cured by Bethany Wiggins; Dangerous by Shannon Hale; Remake by Ilima Todd; The Glass Magician by Charlie N. Holmberg	Andrew Hall
Lifetime Achievement
Margaret Blair Young

2015
General	Historical
Winner: The Other Side of Quiet by Tara C. Allred Other finalists: The McCarran Collection by Liz Adair; Wreckage by Emily Bleeker; The Healer by Gregg Luke; Shattered Hearts by Stacy Lynn Carroll	Winner: The Rules in Rome by A.L. Sowards Other Finalists: Light of the Candle by Carol Pratt Bradley; A Hope Remembered by Stacy Henrie; Doing No Harm by Carla Kelly; The Moses Chronicles: Bondage by H.B. Moore
Mystery/Suspense	Romance
Winner: Failsafe by Traci Hunter Abramson Other Finalists: Played for a Fool by Stephanie Black; Lie Catchers by Paul Bishop; Lost King by H.B. Moore; The Angel Court Affair by Anne Perry	Winner: Lord Fenton's Folly by Josi S. Kilpack Other Finalists: Always Will by Melanie Jacobson; Eleanor and the Iron King by Julie Daines; Miss Burton Unmasks a Prince by Jennifer Moore; Kisses in the Rain by Krista Lynne Jensen
Speculative	Middle Grade
Winner: The Devil's Only Friend by Dan Wells Other Finalists: Shadows of Self by Brandon Sanderson; Summer Queen by Amber Argyle; Caretaker by Josi Russell; Truth of Embers by Caitlyn McFarland	Winner: A Night Divided by Jennifer Nielsen Other Finalists: Fires of Invention by J. Scott Savage; Mark of the Thief by Jennifer Nielsen; Far World: Fire Keep by J. Scott Savage; Mothman's Curse by Christine Hayes
General Young Adult Fiction	Speculative Young Adult Fiction
Winner: Calvin by Martine Leavitt Other Finalists: Never Said by Carol Lynch Williams; The Fill-In Boyfriend by Kasie West; Has to Be Love by Jolene Perry; Ink and Ashes by Valynne E. Maetani	Winner: Firefight by Brandon Sanderson Other Finalists: Followed by Frost by Charlie N. Holmberg; This Monstrous Thing by Mackenzi Lee; Airships of Camelot by Robison Wells; A Thousand Faces by Janci Patterson
Best Novel by a New Author	
Winner: Ink and Ashes by Valynne E. Maetani Finalists: Light of the Candle by Carol Pratt Bradley; This Monstrous Thing by Mackenzi Lee; Wreckage by Emily Bleeker; Caretaker by Josi Russell; Mothman's Curse by Christine Hayes	
Outstanding Achievement Award	Lifetime Achievement Award
Tracy Hickman and Laura Hickman	Marsha Ward
Novel of the Year (Adult)	Novel of the Year (Youth)
Lord Fenton’s Folly by Josi S. Kilpack	A Night Divided by Jennifer A. Nielsen

2016
General	Historical
Winner: The Orphan Keeper by Camron Wright Other finalists: When I’m Gone by Emily Bleeker; The Dragons of Alsace Farm by Laurie Lewis; The {Re}Model Marriage by Maria Hoagland; The Soldier’s Bride by Rachelle J. Christensen	Winner: From Sand and Ash by Amy Harmon Other Finalists: A Place for Miss Snow by Jennifer Moore; Exodus by H.B. Moore; Born to Treason by E.B. Wheeler; Deliverance by H.B. Moore
Mystery/Suspense	Contemporary Romance
Winner: Pimpernel by Sheralyn Pratt Other Finalists: Revenge in a Cold River by Anne Perry; The Chemist by Stephenie Meyer; Slave Queen by H.B. Moore; Walk of Infamy by Sheralyn Pratt	Winner: Love at First Note by Jenny Proctor Other Finalists: Southern Charmed by Melanie Jacobson; How I Met Your Brother by Janette Rallison; A Date with Danger by Kari Iroz; Love’s Shadow by Nichole Van
Historical Romance	Speculative
Winner: My Fair Gentleman by Nancy Campbell Allen Other Finalists: The Sheriffs of Savage Wells by Sarah M. Eden; Lady Helen Finds Her Song by Jennifer Moore; The Fall of Lord Drayson by Rachael Anderson; Willowkeep by Julie Daines	Winner: The Bands of Mourning by Brandon Sanderson Other Finalists: Over Your Dead Body by Dan Wells; Extreme Makeover by Dan Wells; The Bird and the Sword by Amy Harmon; The Longest Con by Michaelbrent Collings
Middle Grade	General Young Adult Fiction
Winner: Summerlost by Ally Condie Other Finalists: The Wrong Side of Magic by Janette Rallison; Gears of Revolution by J. Scott Savage; Red: The True Story of Red Riding Hood by Liesl Shurtliff; Ghostsitter by Shelly Brown	Winner: The Passion of Dolssa by Julie Berry Other Finalists: The Serpent King by Jeff Zentner; P.S. I Like You by Kasie West; Blackhearts by Nicole Castroman; The Truth About Fragile Things by Regina Sirois
Speculative Young Adult Fiction	Best Debut Novel
Winner: Calamity by Brandon Sanderson Other Finalists: Bluescreen by Dan Wells; The Girl Who Heard Demons by Janette Rallison; Death Thieves by Julie Wright; Beyond the Rising Tide by Sarah Beard	Winner: The Serpent King by Jeff Zentner Finalists: Blackhearts by Nicole Castroman; Ghostsitter by Shelly Brown
Novel of the Year (Adult)	Novel of the Year (Youth)
From Sand and Ash by Amy Harmon	Summerlost by Ally Condie
Outstanding Achievement Award	
Liz Adair Marilyn Brown	

2017
General	Historical
Winner: The Fattest Mormon by Tyson Abaroa Other finalists: Carve Me a Melody by Rachelle J. Christensen; The Book of Laman by Mette Harrison; Flight of the Wounded Falcon by Trish Mercer; Gilda Trillim: Shepherdess of Rats by Steven L. Peck	Winner: Condemn Me Not by Heather B. Moore Other Finalists: Waiting for the Light by Carol Pratt Bradley; Courting Carrie in Wonderland by Carla Kelly; The Proud Shall Stumble by Gerald N. Lund; Defiance by A.L. Sowards
Mystery/Suspense	Romance
Winner: Safe House by Traci Hunter Abramson Other Finalists: The Capture by Julie Coulter Bellon; The Killing Curse by H.B. Moore; Deadly Inheritance by Clair M. Poulson; Clear Expectations by Terri Reid	Winner: Lies Jane Austen Told Me by Julie Wright Other Finalists: Mormon Girl Incognito by Kari Iroz; Brush with Love by Lisa McKendrick; Wrong for You by Jenny Proctor; Outshine by Nichole Van
Historical Romance	Speculative
Winner: Love Remains by Sarah M. Eden Other Finalists: The Secret of the India Orchid by Nancy Campbell Allen; Havencross by Julie Daines; Ruth by H.B. Moore; Petticoat Spy by Carol Warburton	Winner: The Fifth Doll by Charlie N. Holmberg Other Finalists: Fallen Stone by Jana S. Brown; The Queen and the Cure by Amy Harmon; Abounding Might by Melissa McShane; Pretender to the Crown by Melissa McShane
Middle Grade	General Young Adult Fiction
Winner: Paper Chains by Elaine Vickers Other Finalists: The Emperor’s Ostrich by Julie Berry; Mustaches for Maddie by Chad Morris and Shelly Brown; Wrath of the Storm by Jennifer A. Nielsen; Embers of Destruction by J. Scott Savage	Winner: By Your Side by Kasie West Other Finalists: Remember Me Always by Renee Collins; The Duke of Bannerman Prep by Katie A. Nelson; All the Forever Things by Jolene Perry; Love, Life, and the List by Kasie West; Goodbye Days by Jeff Zentner
Speculative Young Adult Fiction	Fantasy Young Adult Fiction
Winner: Ones and Zeroes by Dan Wells Other Finalists: The Unbeatable Squirrel Girl by Shannon Hale and Dean Hale; Beyond by Catina Haverlock and Angela Larkin; The Hundredth Queen by Emily R. King; Last Star Burning by Caitlin Sangster	Winner: Blood Rose Rebellion by Rosalyn Eves Finalists: Dark Breaks the Dawn by Sara B. Larson; Daughter of the Pirate King by Tricia Levenseller; Crystal Blade by Kathryn Purdie; Poison’s Kiss by Breeana Shields
Novel of the Year (Adult)	Novel of the Year (Youth)
Safe House by Traci Hunter Abramson	The Hundredth Queen by Emily R. King
Best Debut Novel	
Winner: The Hundredth Queen by Emily R. King Finalists: The Fattest Mormon by Tyson Abaroa; Blood Rose Rebellion by Rosalyn Eves; Beyond by CatinaHaverlock and Angela Larkin; Daughter of the Pirate King by Tricia Levenseller; The Duke of Bannerman Prep by Katie A. Nelson; Last Star Burning Caitlin Sangster; Poison’s Kiss by Breeana Shields	
Outstanding Achievement Award
Robison Wells

2018
General	Mystery/Suspense
Winner: As Wide as the Sky by Jessica Pack Other finalists: The Unlikely Master Genius by Carla Kelly; Anna the Prophetess by H.B. Moore; One Candle by Gale Sears; The Other Side of the Bridge by Camron Wright	Winner: A Familiar Fear by Kathi Oram Peterson Other Finalists: Tripwire by Traci Hunter Abramson; The Darkling Bride by Laura Andersen; Second Look by Julie Coulter Bellon; Conviction by Robbin J. Peterson
Romance	Historical Romance
Winner: Perfect Set by Melanie Jacobson Other Finalists: Love at Lakeview Med by T. J. Amberson; Match Me if You Can by Lindzee Armstrong; Until We Kissed by Heather B. Moore; Silver Star by Lisa Swinton	Winner: Seeing Miss Heartstone by Nichole Van Other Finalists: My Sister’s Intended by Rachael Anderson; The Truth About Miss Ashbourne by Joanna Barker; Promises and Primroses by Josi S. Kilpack; Flame and Ember by M. A. Nichols
Speculative	Middle Grade
Winner: Witchy Winter by D. J. Butler Other Finalists: The Arawn Prophecy by C. David Belt; Veins of Gold by Charlie N. Holmberg; Blood Requiem by Christopher Husberg; Aether Spark by Nicholas Petrarch	Winner: Resistance by Jennifer A. Nielsen Other Finalists: The Three Rules of Everyday Magic by Amanda Rawson Hill; Squint by Chad Morris and Shelly Brown; Grump by Liesl Shurtliff; Passage to Avalon by Mike Thayer
General Young Adult Fiction	Fantasy Young Adult Fiction
Winner: Girl at the Grave by Teri Bailey Black Other Finalists: Good Girls Stay Quiet by Jo Cassidy; The Awful Wonderful Story of Us by Jolene Perry; Shoot The Moon by Kate Watson; Once I Was a Beehive by Carole Lynch Williams	Winner: The Traitor’s Game by Jennifer A. Nielsen Other Finalists: Stolen Enchantress by Amber Argyle; The Plastic Magician by Charlie N. Holmberg; Frozen Reign by Kathryn Purdie; Iron Garland by Jeff Wheeler
Speculative Young Adult Fiction	Best Debut Novel
Winner: First Kisses Suck by Ali Cross Other Finalists: Blood Creek Witch by Jay Barnson; Willow Marsh by Jo Cassidy; In Her Dreams by Joanna Reeder; Shatter the Suns by Caitlin Sangster	Winner: Girl at the Grave by Teri Bailey Black Finalists: The Truth About Miss Ashbourne by Joanna Barker; Blood Creek Witch by Jay Barnson; The Three Rules of Everyday Magic by Amanda Rawson Hill; Aether Spark by Nicholas Petrarch
Novel of the Year (Adult)	Novel of the Year (Youth)
As Wide as the Sky by Jessica Pack	Resistance by Jennifer A. Nielsen
Outstanding Achievement Award
Elana Johnson Lisa Mangum

2019
General	Mystery/Suspense
Winner: Muddy: Where Faith and Polygamy Collide by Dean Hughes Other finalists: The Book of Abish by Mette Harrison; Whatever it Takes by Jessica Pack; The Girl in Gray by Annette Lyon; Deborah: Prophetess of God by H.B. Moore	Winner: Mistaken Reality by Traci Hunter Abramson Other Finalists: Sanctuary by Traci Hunter Abramson; Nest Egg by Josi Avari; Robin and Marian by Stephanie Fowers; Death in Focus by Anne Perry
Romance	Historical Romance
Winner: Finding Jack by Melanie Jacobson Other Finalists: Hitching the Pitcher by Connolly, Summers, Moore; Love Again at the Heart of Main Street by Meg Easton; Dreaming of the Next Door Doc by Brenna Jacobs; Missed Kiss by Cassie Mae	Winner: What the Wind Knows by Amy Harmon Other Finalists: Miss Adeline's Match by Joanna Barker; The Paradox of Love by Teri Harman; A Song of the Stars by Ilima Todd; Suffering the Scot by Nichole Van
Speculative	Middle Grade
Winner: The First Girl Child by Amy Harmon Other Finalists: House of Assassins by Larry Correia; to Kill a Curse by Jennifer Jenkins; The View From Castle Always by Melissa McShane; A Dragon's Fate by Daniel Swenson	Winner: Dragonwatch: Master of the Phantom Isle by Brandon Mull Other Finalists: Kazu Jones and the Denver Dognappers by Shauna Holyoak; The Obsidian Compass by Liesl Shurtliff; A Monster Like Me by Wendy S. Swore; The Vacant Realm by Mike Thayer
General Young Adult Fiction	Fantasy Young Adult Fiction
Winner: Lovely War by Julie Berry Other Finalists: Just for Clicks by Kara McDowell; Paul, Big and Small by David Glen Robb; Scars Like Wings by Erin Stewart; Rayne and Delilah's Midnite Matinee by Jeff Zentner	Winner: The Bone Charmer by Breeana Shields Other Finalists: Smoke and Summons by Charlie Holmberg; Before the Broken Star by Emily R. King; Warrior of the Wild by Tricia Levenseller; An Affair of Poisons by Addie Thorley
Speculative Young Adult Fiction	Best Debut Novel
Winner: The Last Voyage of Poe Blythe by Ally Condie Other Finalists: Displaced by Bridget E. Baker; Harper by Jo Cassidy; Shattered Snow by Rachel Huffmire; Lovestruck by Kate Watson	Winner: Scars Like Wings by Erin Stewart Finalists: Kazu Jones and the Denver Dognappers by Shauna Holyoak; Shattered Snow by Rachel Huffmire; Just For Clicks by Kara McDowell; A Monster Like Me by Wendy S. Swore; An Affair of Poisons by Addie Thorley
Novel of the Year (Adult)	Novel of the Year (Youth)
Sanctuary by Tracy Hunter Abramson	Lovely War by Julie Berry

2022
General	Mystery/Suspense
Winner: The Audacity of Sara Grayson by Joani Elliott Other finalists: Of Sword and Shadow by A.L. Sowards; The Slow March of Light by Heather B. Moore; The Unselected Journals of Emma M. Lion: Vol. 5 by Beth Brower; Heirs of Falcon Point by Traci Hunter Abramson, Sian Ann Bessey, Paige Edwards and A.L. Sowards	Winner: Treacherous Legacy by Kathi Oram Peterson Other Finalists: The Secret Life of Miss Mary Bennet by Katherine Cowley; Heart of the Enemy by Heidi McKusick; Danger on the Loch by Paige Edwards; Constantine Capers: The Pennington Perplexity by Natalie Brianne
Romance	Historical Romance
Winner: So Not My Thing by Melanie Jacobson Other Finalists: The Accidental Text by Becky Monson; The Cowboy and the Girl Next Door by Janette Rallison; Fly Home to Me by Chalon Linton; Only Ever Friends by Shaela Kay	Winner: A Proper Scoundrel by Esther Hatch Other Finalists: The Captain's Confidant by Ashtyn Newbold; Heart in the Highlands by Heidi Kimball; The Nabob's Daughter by Jess Heileman; Songbook of Benny Lament by Amy Harmon
Speculative	Middle Grade
Winner: Rhythm of War by Brandon Sanderson Other Finalists: A Proper Dragon by E. B. Wheeler; Prospector's Choice by Kevin W. Bates; The Second Blind Son by Amy Harmon; Spellbreaker by Charlie N. Holmberg	Winner: Cece Rios and the Desert of Souls by Kaela Rivera Other Finalists: Breathing Underwater by Sarah Allen; Return of the Dragon Slayers by Brandon Mull; The Stars of Whistling Ridge by Cindy Baldwin; Wish Upon a Stray by Yamile Saied Mendez
General Young Adult Fiction	Fantasy Young Adult Fiction
Winner: Beyond the Mapped Stars by Rosalyn Eves Other Finalists: A Sisterhood of Secret Ambitions by Sheena Boekweg; Fadeaway by E. B. Vickers; Fourth Sister by M. L. Farb; Where I Belong by Marcia Argueta Mickelson	Winner: The Splendor by Breeana Shields Other Finalists: Bone Crier's Dawn by Kathryn Purdie; Rainbringer by Adam Berg; She Who Rides the Storm by Caitlin Sangster; Sing Me Forgotten by Jessica Olson
Speculative Young Adult Fiction	Best Debut Novel
Winner: Entanglement by Shannen Camp Other Finalists: Becoming Human by Amy Michelle Carpenter; The Promised Prince by Kortney Keisel; Republic of Ruin by L. Blaise Hues; Unseen by R. M. Scott	Winner: The Audacity of Sara Grayson by Joani Elliott
Novel of the Year (Adult)	Novel of the Year (Youth)
Rhythm of War by Brandon Sanderson	Beyond the Mapped Stars by Rosalyn Eves

== Committee ==
The Whitney Awards Committee acts as both the organizers and the preliminary judges of the Whitney Awards. Rules stipulate that the committee be made up of at least four members of LDStorymakers. Their positions are temporary, by invitation of the Whitney Awards Committee president (who is appointed by the LDStorymakers executive committee).

The 2009 committee included:

- Robison Wells, president
- Julie Coulter Bellon
- Danyelle Ferguson
- John Ferguson
- Crystal Leichty
- Sheila Staley
- Jaime Theler

The 2011 committee included:

- Josi S. Kilpack, president
- Annette Lyon
- Heather B. Moore
- Jana Parkin
- Sarah M. Eden
- Luisa Perkins

The 2015 committee were:

- Jaime Theler, president
- Kaylee Baldwin
- Marion Jensen
- Nancy Campbell Allen
- Heather Justesen
- Deborah Talmadge-Bickmore
- Kimberly Vanderhorst

The 2017 committee:

- Peggy Eddleman, president
- Janet Sumner Johnson
- Josi S. Kilpack
- Monique Luetkemeyer
- Jeremy Maughan
- E.B. Wheeler
- Michelle Wilson
- Jared Garrett

Although Kerry Blair had been a member of the Whitney Awards Committee for two years, the other members of the committee "went behind her back" to name her the winner of a Lifetime Achievement Award for 2008.

== Reception ==
One Mormon literature critic initially raised concerns with the heavy involvement of authors published by Covenant Communications in the awards process. However, when the finalists for 2007 were announced, this same commenter noted both that there was a wide spectrum of publishers represented, and that "Covenant publishes the lion's share of Mormon market fiction." This same critic later described the awards as "at best a reductive form of validation and criticism. Although let's be honest: The Whitneys have way more credibility than the Grammys."

After the 2011 nominations, criticism of the nomination process was common, though appreciation of the Whitney Awards themselves was also common.

== See also ==
- AML Awards
- LDS fiction
