= Mormon fiction =

Fiction by or about members of The Church of Jesus Christ of Latter-day Saints

Mormon fiction is generally fiction by or about members of the Church of Jesus Christ of Latter-day Saints (LDS Church), who are also referred to as Latter-day Saints or Mormons, but the Church no longer uses those terms. Its history is commonly divided into four sections as first organized by Eugene England: foundations, home literature, the "lost" generation, and faithful realism. During the first fifty years of the church's existence, 1830–1880, fiction was not popular, though Parley P. Pratt wrote a fictional Dialogue between Joseph Smith and the Devil. With the emergence of the novel and short stories as popular reading material, Orson F. Whitney called on fellow members to write inspirational stories. During this "home literature" movement, church-published magazines published many didactic stories and Nephi Anderson wrote the novel Added Upon. The generation of writers after the home literature movement produced fiction that was recognized nationally but was seen as rebelling against home literature's outward moralization. Vardis Fisher's Children of God and Maurine Whipple's The Giant Joshua were prominent novels from this time period. In the 1970s and 1980s, authors began writing realistic fiction as faithful members of the LDS Church. Acclaimed examples include Levi S. Peterson's The Backslider and Linda Sillitoe's Sideways to the Sun. Home literature experienced a resurgence in popularity in the 1980s and 1990s when church-owned Deseret Book began to publish more fiction, including Gerald Lund's historical fiction series The Work and the Glory and Jack Weyland's novels.

Latter-day Saint authors are well-represented in various literary genres. A tradition of conforming to conventions and building communities may explain why Mormon authors are successful in genre fiction. Fiction by Glenn Beck, Jason F. Wright, and Richard Paul Evans has featured on New York Times bestseller lists. Orson Scott Card, Stephenie Meyer, and Brandon Sanderson are award-winning popular authors of science fiction and fantasy novels. Shannon Hale, James Dashner, and Ally Condie are popular authors of young adult science fiction and fantasy. The Association for Mormon Letters and LDStorymakers support their faith's authors with awards and conferences.

There have been some controversies over Mormon authors and their works. Brian Evenson resigned from his job at Brigham Young University (BYU) after controversy over his short story collection. In the past, Deseret Book has declined to sell books from popular authors because of their content. In 2013, Cedar Fort refused to sell a contracted book after one of the authors wanted to include a reference to his male partner in his author bio.

== History ==
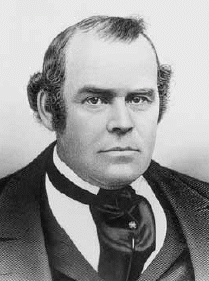
Parley P. Pratt

Mormon fiction's history begins at the same time as the LDS Church. The history of LDS literature is generally divided into four periods, as organized by Eugene England in his article on the subject.

=== Foundations: 1830–1880 ===
Early written works among Mormons were generally non-fiction, including scripture, missionary tracts, and doctrinal literature. In 1844, Parley P. Pratt published what is commonly cited as the first work of LDS fiction, the didactic Dialogue between Joseph Smith and the Devil. It was first published in the New York Herald. Early Mormon leaders like Brigham Young and George Q. Cannon condemned novels for wasting time, a rhetoric that persisted until the 1880s.

=== Home literature: 1880–1930 ===
Fiction among LDS Church members developed once the Mormons had settled in Utah and developed a degree of economic stability. In 1888, Orson F. Whitney called for an increase in "home literature", a "literature whose top shall touch heaven". He contributed his own poetry to the efforts. In response to Whitney's call, LDS periodicals published didactic stories. There was still resistance to the idea of reading fiction. In 1879, a church magazine called Contributor was established to encourage members to write. The third issue condemned fiction as unhealthy for the mind, and the magazine did not publish it in early issues. Later, in 1889, B. H. Roberts wrote an essay for Contributor on how fiction had increased in scope and popularity, and published his own historical short fiction, "A Story of Zarahemla", in the periodical that year. Woman's Exponent, founded in 1872 and Young Woman's Journal, beginning in 1889, also published home literature. Relief Society Magazine began in 1915, with an entire department dedicated to "Arts and Literature".

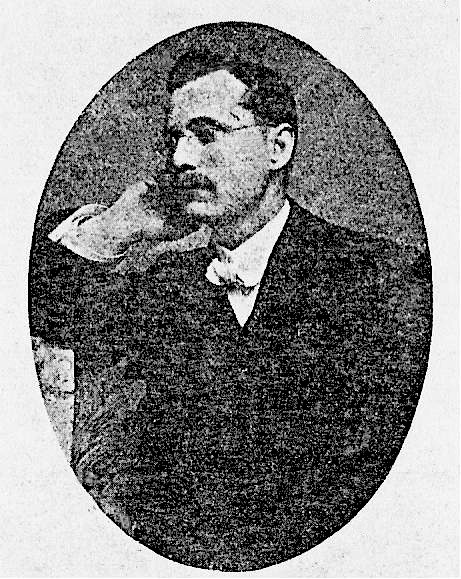
Nephi Anderson

The most successful work of LDS fiction in this period was the novel Added Upon (1898) by Nephi Anderson. Following a man and woman from their pre-earth life, through life on the earth and into the afterlife, Added Upon also served as a model plot for later LDS fictional works, such as the 1970s musical Saturday's Warrior by Lex de Azevedo. Michael Austin noted in 1998 that Added Upon opened the door to fiction based on Mormon theology. Josephine Spencer was another popular writer who Gean Clark called the "most versatile and skillful" of early Mormon writers.

Brigham Young's daughter, Susa Young Gates, published a fairly successful novel, John Stevens' Courtship (1909), and B. H. Roberts wrote the novel Corianton, which Orestes Utah Bean plagiarized into a play and adapted into a movie. The literary development in this period stimulated the development of the first professional LDS publishing company in 1866. Originally independent of the church, George Q. Cannon and Sons is now part of Deseret Book.

=== The "lost" generation: 1930–1970 ===
While this "home literature" has continued to be produced ever since, a new generation of LDS writers arose in the mid century, one that was able to be published nationally and gain national recognition, but generally at the expense of close ties to the church and in rebellion against the moralism of "home literature", leading this generation to be called the "lost" generation.

Vardis Fisher was born in Idaho and his parents were Mormon; he joined the LDS Church briefly as an adult but did not identify as Mormon. Mormon characters are prominent in his early fiction. He won the Harper Prize in 1939 for Children of God (1939). Fisher's later fiction does not feature Mormon characters. In a 1976 paper, Leonard Arrington and his student, John Haupt, renewed interest in Fisher's Mormon heritage, arguing that he did not completely reject Mormonism. Fisher's widow subsequently issued a press release stating that Fisher was not Mormon. A 2014 Dialogue essay by Michael Austin concluded that Fisher was definitely influenced by the religion he rejected.

"Historical-regional" novels were prevalent during this era, which Karl Keller called the "best fiction to come out of the Church" and criticized it as a byproduct of "a history and lifestyle that has already been created". In this genre of "provincial" novels, Samuel W. Taylor wrote the humorous Heaven Knows Why (1948). Maurine Whipple won the Houghton Mifflin Literary Prize in 1938 and published The Giant Joshua (1941), which presented plural marriage as a test of faith similar to colonizing Utah's desert. In "Fifty Important Mormon Books", Curt Bench reported that Mormon scholars in 1990 unanimously chose The Giant Joshua as the best Mormon novel before 1980. Virginia Sorensen is best known for A Little Lower than the Angels (1942), which also addressed the emotional hardship of polygamy, and the acclaimed The Evening and the Morning (1949). Her children's book, Miracles on Maple Hill (1957), won a Newbery Award. Edward Geary wrote that Sorenson "perhaps realizes regionalist's ambivalence more completely than any other". Other notable writers from this period include Paul Bailey, Ardyth Kennelly, Lorene Pearson, and Blanche Cannon. These "provincial" novels often feature a protagonist who belongs to her community, yet desires to leave. Another character, usually a man, is committed to community values and grows fanatical, opposing the protagonist. A third character, usually the child of the first two characters, leaves the community for a more individualistic life. Often a fourth character will take on the role of "liberating Gentile", an outsider who tempts characters to leave their community or violate its norms. In an analysis of the "lost" generation, Terryl Givens argues that the novels from this era were "too compliant with the voices of criticism and cynicism to produce an art fully worthy of its subject".

=== Faithful realism: 1960 to present ===
In the 1960s Clinton F. Larsen developed poetry in a faithful modernist style, but it was not until the mid-1980s that novels emerged in this mode. Starting in the 1970s, BYU professors Douglas Thayer and Donald R. Marshall began to write skillful stories that explored Mormon thought and culture in a critical but fundamentally affirmative way. Marshall published collections The Rummage Sale: Collections and Recollections (1972) and Frost in the Orchard (1977). Thayer began publishing stories in BYU Studies and Dialogue in the mid-1960s, and published his collection of short stories, Under the Cottonwoods, in 1977. In 1974, Karl Keller praised Thayer for using "concrete, worldly symbols" to articulate his faith, but stated that his work did not go as far as creating a world where Mormon theology was "concretely true". Keller called on authors to follow Flannery O'Conner's example and let religion be "the light by which [they] see" rather than a substitute for seeing.

Levi S. Peterson, influenced by Thayer, wrote The Backslider (1986), which Terryl Givens called the "standard for the contemporary Mormon novel". Common themes in Peterson's work are the conflict between justice and mercy and between religious and secular thought. Eugene England hailed Linda Sillitoe's Sideways to the Sun (1987) as "the first good Mormon novel about 1980s Mormon life in Utah". It features a typical Mormon housewife whose husband disappears, leading her to form a new, more independent identity. Also in 1987, Orson Scott Card published Seventh Son, which England wrote "raises troubling questions about the supposedly sharp borderline between magic and religion."

The "faithful realism" genre of LDS fiction refers to "challenging Mormon-themed fiction" written by Mormons for Mormons, and only represents a small part of LDS fiction. Other writers in this genre include Margaret Blair Young, Phyllis Barber, Marilyn Brown, and John Bennion. Richard Cracroft called Douglas Thayer's The Tree House (2010) the "best LDS literary novel of recent decades". The Mormon missionary novel, a common Mormon Bildungsroman, commonly falls under the faithful realism or modern home literature genre; Michael Fillerup's Beyond the River and Alan Mitchell's Angel of the Danube (2000) fall on the faithful realism side of the spectrum. Faithful realist fiction has been anthologized by Levi Peterson in Greening Wheat: Fifteen Mormon Short Stories (1983), by Eugene England in Bright Angels and Familiars (1992), in by Orson Scott Card and David Dollahite in Turning Hearts: Short Stories on Family Life (1994) and by Angela Hallstrom in Dispensation (2010). Eugene England noted that In Our Lovely Deseret, while also a realist anthology, differed notably from the faithful realist anthologies by having stories with "in-your-face impiety." In 2017, the Mormon blog By Common Consent began the By Common Consent Press, a volunteer, non-profit press.

Mormon, or formerly Mormon, authors also write literary fiction for a general audience. Terry Tempest Williams's Refuge is commonly anthologized and taught in college classes. Works by Walter Kirn and Judith Freeman appeal to non-Mormon audiences and deal with Mormon issues.

=== Mormon folk realism: 2000–present ===
Writing for Irreantum in 2000, Eric Eliason described Phyllis Barber's Parting the Veil as part of a Mormon magical realism movement in Mormon fiction, along with works by Orson Scott Card and Levi Peterson. He stated that their work "allows for the reality of sacred experience and the possibility of bumping into beings of light". In his dissertation on Mormon Literature, Scott Hales proposed a new type of Mormon literature that embraces ambiguity and is more concerned with the experience of Mormonism than its truth. It tends to blur genres and subvert expectations, and includes a range of literary styles. Hales attributes this shift to the way the LDS church has changed how it interacts with the public opinions of its members. In the early 1990s, several intellectuals were excommunicated in connection with their ideas and criticism of the church. Later, when church members began voicing opinions online on social media and in the Mormon blogosphere, communal criticism and doctrinal speculation became more common and unlikely to lead to ecclesiastical action. The New Mormon Fiction provides a place for readers to "explore the cultural upheaval that surrounds them". Hales and William Morris have since suggested that this type of literature be called "Mormon Folk Realism". Hales lists the work of several authors as falling under this category, including Arianne Cope's The Coming of Elijah (2006), Coke Newell's On the Road to Heaven (2007), Todd Robert Peterson's Family History (2007), Brady Udall's The Lonely Polygamist (2010), and Steven L. Peck's The Scholar of Moab (2011).

=== Modern home literature: 1980–present ===
Authors produced a new "home literature" of uplifting literature marketed to Mormon audiences and usually published by Deseret Book. Popular authors in the 1980s included Jack Weyland and Blaine M. Yorgason. In the 1990s, Deseret Book, Bookcraft, and Covenant Communications, publishers targeting the LDS market, began selling more works of fiction. Other small publishers too began publishing fiction for the LDS market. Deseret Book published The Work and the Glory historical fiction series by Gerald Lund. The popular nine-volume series sold over two million copies. Dean Hughes is known for the series Children of the Promise, set in World War II, and Hearts of the Fathers, which follows the same family into the 1960s. Tennis Shoes Among the Nephites, a series about people transported into scriptural times, was also published in the 1990s. Anita Stansfield's Mormon romance First Love and Forever (1994) sold over 40,000 copies and paved the way for similar novels, such as those by Susan Evans McCloud, Rachel Nunes, and Jennie Hansen.

In a 2010 essay examining how LDS fiction has changed since the 1990s, Jennie Hansen wrote that the writing improved over time and LDS publishers stopped requiring an explicit LDS connection. Hansen also noted that some publishers cut corners on editing and "do not always adhere to LDS standards". In 2006, Deseret Book stopped selling books to Seagull Book; Deseret Book's books accounted for about half of Seagull Book's book sales. Later that year, Deseret Book purchased Seagull Book and Covenant Communications, which greatly reduced Deseret Book's competition.

== Genre fiction ==
LDS authors' success in genre fiction is perhaps because, as Rosalynde Welch argues, "Mormon culture values superior performance of shared forms over the originality of invention." She notes that the communities Mormons foster in their families and wards is duplicated in the way authors understand genre communities. Building on Welch's work, Jana Riess argues that LDS authors are adept at conforming to genre expectations, and that the way they form and interact with their reading and writing communities contributes to their success. At Times and Seasons, Nathaniel Givens states that Mormonism's lack of "official" theology or creeds leads members to a culture of "amateur theology". This culture leads to theories that make good science fiction stories.

In a New York Times article, Shannon Hale theorized that LDS authors are drawn to genre fiction because they prefer happy endings to bleak or tragic stories. Hale also noted that strong writing communities for LDS authors in children's and YA genres draw budding authors to those genres. In the same article, Rachel Nunes explained that, given that many LDS authors prefer not to include sexual content, they often write in the young adult genre, where avoiding sexual content is less conspicuous. In response to these arguments, Leah Libresco points out that Ender's Game did not shy away from violent content, and also that sexual content seems like a requirement for YA novels, with tamer books being relegated to the children's section.

=== Inspirational fiction ===
LDS radio host Glenn Beck co-authored The Christmas Sweater, which was a number one New York Times bestseller in 2008. Jason F. Wright co-authored The Christmas Sweater with Beck; he also wrote The Wednesday Letters and The Christmas Jars, both New York Times bestsellers. Richard Paul Evans's The Christmas Box was a number one New York Times bestseller. Evans has written 30 other novels in romance, action, and fantasy genres, and each novel spent some time on the New York Times bestseller list.

=== Science fiction and fantasy ===
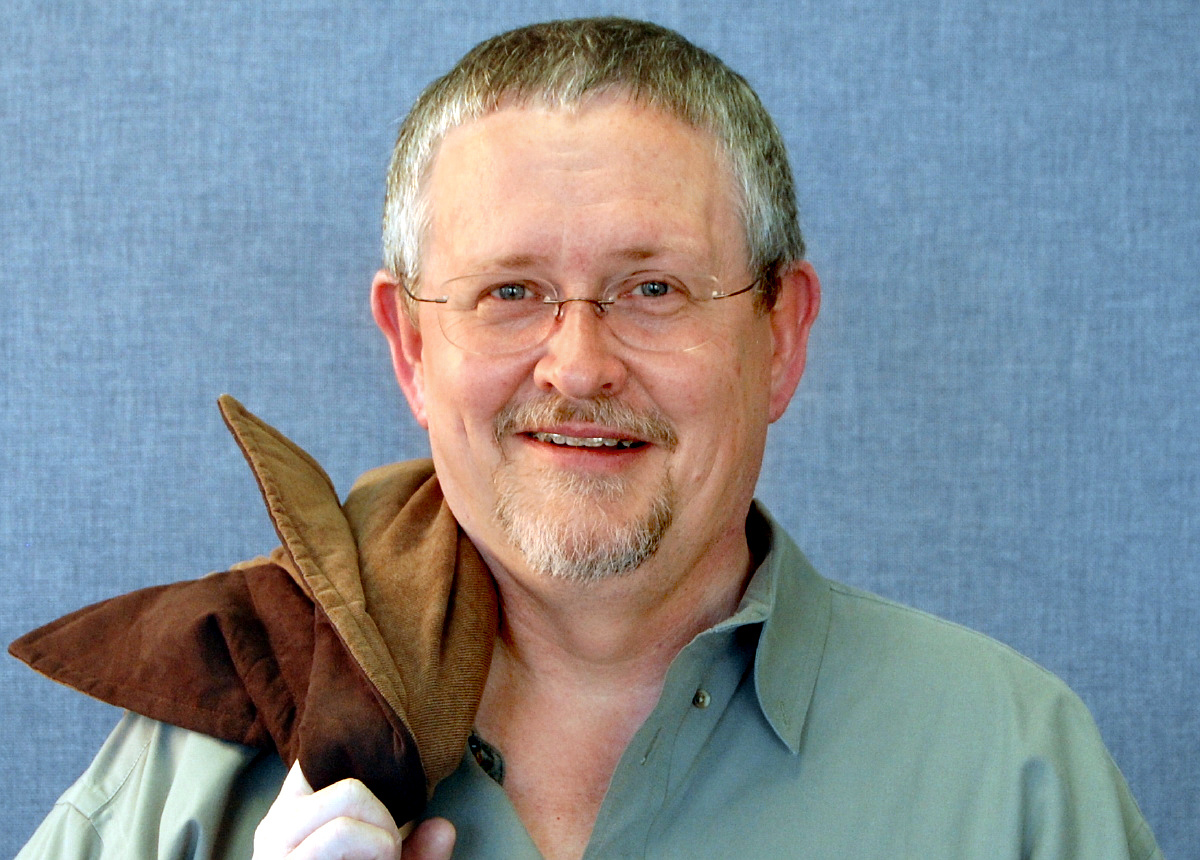
Orson Scott Card

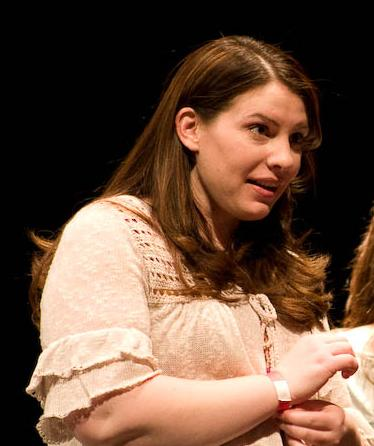
Stephenie Meyer

A number of LDS authors are successful science fiction and fantasy authors. Orson Scott Card was the first prominent LDS science fiction writer. He earned Hugo and Nebula Awards in 1986 and 1987 for his books Ender's Game and Speaker for the Dead. Also in the 1980s, Tracy Hickman helped to develop the gaming fiction genre, writing adventure models connected to TSR's Advanced Dungeons and Dragons and co-authoring Dragonlance novels with Margaret Weis. Stephenie Meyer, known for writing the Twilight series, wrote The Host, which was a New York Times bestseller for over a year. Brandon Sanderson, writer of epic fantasy, is another LDS author of New York Times bestsellers, including The Stormlight Archive. Sanderson has also written YA fantasy, including The Reckoners series of urban fantasy. Zenna Henderson, popular in the 1960s for her stories about "The People", was raised in an LDS family. According to Terryl Givens, science fiction works by Mormons commonly explore ideas "at the margins of conventional thinking", like life on other planets and apotheosis. According to Preston Hunter at adherents.com, a quarter of novels that won Hugo or Nebula awards had an LDS author or references to Latter-day Saints and Utah.

=== Children's and YA fiction ===
In 2014, Utah had more nationally recognized children's book writers and illustrators per capita than any other state. Rick Walton, a prolific author of children's books, helped to foster a community of children's book authors in Utah by leading critique groups and hosting a listserv for authors to meet and support each other. The invitation-only group began as a listserv in 2001, and in 2014, held monthly meetings. Walton, Carol Lynch Williams, and Cheri Earl planned the Writing and Illustrating for Young Readers annual conference starting in 2000.

LDS authors of young adult novels frequently write in fantasy or science fiction genres. Shannon Hale won the 2006 Newbery Award for her middle-grade fantasy novel Princess Academy. Brandon Mull, Aprilynne Pike, Jessica Day George, and Kiersten White are also prominent writers of middle grade and YA fantasy. James Dashner and Ally Condie have written popular dystopian YA novels. Robert Farrell Smith wrote the Leven Thumps series under the pseudonym Obert Skye.

== Associations and awards ==
In 1976, the Association for Mormon Letters (AML) held its first annual symposium. The association created an e-mail forum, AML-list, in 1995, and began the blog "The Dawning of a Brighter Day" in 2009. The group has given annual awards since 1977. The Mormon writers group, LDStorymakers, starting from a listserv made by Rachel Nunes, has held an annual conference since 2004. Robison Wells founded the Whitney Awards in 2007 as an autonomous subsidiary of LDStorymakers. The science fiction and fantasy conference Life, the Universe, & Everything, held annually in Provo, Utah, often highlights LDS authors. BYU publishes the student-run science fiction and fantasy magazine Leading Edge.

Starting in 1998, the AML began presenting an award to the best unpublished novel manuscript of the regional culture. In 2000 it changed to the Marilyn Brown Novel Award, administered by the UVU English Department. After 2011, the award was changed to a scholarship with a creative writing component.

== Controversies about LDS fiction ==
In the late 1970s, BYU Press declined to publish Nothing Very Important and Other Stories by Bela Petsco, because its content was "too controversial".

While a new professor of creative writing at Brigham Young University (BYU), Brian Evenson published a short-story collection, Altmann's Tongue. A graduate student complained anonymously to church leaders that the work promoted the "enjoyment" of violence, while Evenson argued that his fiction accentuated violence to show its horror and "thus allow it to be condemned". A senior faculty member advised Evenson not to publish similar works in the future. Evenson resigned from BYU in 1995, and left the church formally in 2000.

Deseret Book has refused to sell books from successful LDS authors because of implied adultery, premarital sex, and offensive language. In 2002, they stopped selling several books as a result of a study that showed that their customers did not want to buy books that violated "their core values". They refused to sell Richard Paul Evans's The Last Promise, which contains a scene, where, Deseret Book argued, there was an implication of adultery. In a defense of his work, Evans said that the book "would be a PG-rated movie". Also in 2002, Covenant Communications, an imprint of Deseret Book, declined to publish Anita Stansfield's The Captain of Her Heart because "of its reference to premarital sex". Stansfield self-published the novel. In a column in The Provo Daily Herald, Eric Snider highlighted that Deseret Book still sold the Bible, which contains graphic sex and violence, but conceded that it depicted "the woeful effects of sinning" to better effect than The Last Promise, which described the protagonist leaving her abusive husband positively. In a 2003 interview with Irreantum, Jana Riess said that "increased inventory conservatism" was a trend with Christian publishers at the time and called it a "sound marketing decision" but "troubling from a literary perspective". In 2009, Deseret Book stopped selling novels in the Twilight series and in 2010, Deseret Book declined to stock James Dashner's The Scorch Trials because of offensive language.

In 2013, Cedar Fort Publishing's imprint, Sweetwater Books, deleted gay author Michael Jensen's reference to his partner in his cover bio. Jensen requested that his bio reference his partner, and Lyle Mortimer threatened to publish the book without giving authors credit for their work. Subsequently, Cedar Fort released the writers from their contract and did not publish the book. In response to Cedar Fort's decision, over 40 Mormon authors signed a letter requesting that publishers make their publishing decisions based on a book's content.

== Publishers specializing in the field ==
Presses issuing LDS fiction include:

- BCC Press
- Cedar Fort press
- Covenant Communications
- Deseret Book
- Peculiar Pages
- Signature Books
- Zarahemla Books

== See also ==
- LDS Poetry
- Mormon literature
- Mormon Literature & Creative Arts, a Mormon works database
- AML Awards and Whitney Awards, awards for LDS literature
- Association for Mormon Letters
