= Eyes of a Stranger =

Eyes of a Stranger may refer to:

- Eyes of a Stranger (1981 film), a horror film starring Jennifer Jason Leigh
- Eyes of a Stranger, an alternate title for the film Acting on Impulse
- Eyes of a Stranger (album), an album by The Deele, or the title song
- "Eyes of a Stranger" (Queensrÿche song), 1989
- "Eyes of a Stranger" (Payolas song), 1982
- "Eyes of a Stranger", a song by Edwina Hayes
- "Eyes of a Stranger", a song by Andy Summers on the album XYZ
- Eyes of a Stranger, a book by Rachel Ann Nunes
