= Kerry Blair =

American author

Kerry Blair is an American author.

== Biography ==
Blair currently resides in Mesa, Arizona. She has had multiple sclerosis for many years and is a cancer survivor. She is a member of the Church of Jesus Christ of Latter-day Saints. She is a long-time member of and teacher with ANWA (the American Night Writers Association).

Blair is the author of eight novels and one non-fiction book in the LDS fiction market.

== Bibliography ==
=== Novels ===
- The Heart Has its Reasons (1999) ISBN 1-57734-479-0
- The Heart Has Forever (2000) ISBN 1-57734-647-5
- The Heart Only Knows (2001) ISBN 1-57734-861-3
- Closing in (2002) ISBN 1-59156-012-8
- Digging up the Past (2003) ISBN 1-59156-301-1
- This Just In (2004) ISBN 1-57734-861-3
- Mummy's the Word (2005) ISBN 1-59156-907-9
- Ghost of a Chance (2007) ISBN 1-59811-157-4

=== Nonfiction ===
- Counting Blessings: Wit and Wisdom for Women (2008) ISBN 1-59811-558-8

== Recognition ==
In 2008, Blair received a Lifetime Achievement award from the Whitney Awards. Although she had been a member of the Whitney Awards Committee for two years, the other members of the committee claim they "went behind her back" to name her the winner.
