= Lisa Mangum =

American author and editor

- Education: University of Utah
- Occupations: Writer; Editor
- Spouse: Tracy Mangum
- Writing career
- Language: English
- Period: 1997-present
- Genres: Fantasy; Romance; Science fiction; Nonfiction
- Notable works: The Hourglass Door; The Golden Spiral; After Hello
- Notable awards: Foreword Reviews INDIES (2009, 2010); Whitney Award (2012, 2019)
- Website: Lisa Mangum at shadowmountain.com

Lisa Mangum is an American author and editor best known for her young adult romance trilogy beginning with The Hourglass Door. She has worked as an editor at Deseret Book since 1997, and became the editorial manager at Shadow Mountain in 2014. She has edited several anthologies for WordFire Press, as well as authoring several short fiction and nonfiction works.

She received Foreword Reviews INDIES awards for the first two novels in The Hourglass Door trilogy. She also won two Whitney Awards: one for her 2012 novel, After Hello, and one for outstanding achievement in 2019.

== Biography ==
Lisa Mangum attended the University of Utah, graduating with honors with a degree in English. During her five years in college, she also worked at Waldenbooks, a mall-based bookstore chain. Mangum cites the example of her mother, who was also a writer and editor, as a significant influence in her decision to become an editor.

She was hired as an assistant editor for Bookcraft after graduating. Deseret Book purchased Bookcraft in 1999, and she has worked for them ever since. During her time as an editor, she has worked with several bestselling authors, such as Brandon Mull, Ally Condie, and Jason F. Wright.

Mangum released her first book, a time travel and romance novel titled The Hourglass Door, in May 2009. It won the Foreword Reviews INDIES award in the Best Young Adult Fiction category. The Golden Spiral was released in May 2010 and won in the same category as Hourglass. The final book in the trilogy, The Forgotten Locket, came out in June 2011, and was nominated in the same category as the first two.

Her first short story, "Sold Out", was published in the charity anthology, The Gruff Variations, in March 2012. After Hello, a stand-alone young adult romance set in New York City, was released in September 2012. At the 2012 Whitney Awards, it won in the Best Young Adult General Novel category. Her first anthology, One Horn to Rule Them All, was released by WordFire Press in August 2014. She has edited several additional anthologies for WordFire since then. Mangum became the Editorial Manager at Shadow Mountain (a division of Deseret Book) in 2014.

She currently lives in Taylorsville, Utah with her husband, Tracy. She is also a member of the Church of Jesus Christ of Latter-day Saints.

== Bibliography ==
=== The Hourglass Door trilogy ===
1. The Hourglass Door (May 2009, Shadow Mountain, ISBN 978-1-60641-093-6)
2. The Golden Spiral (May 2010, Shadow Mountain, ISBN 978-1-60641-635-8)
3. The Forgotten Locket (June 2011, Shadow Mountain, ISBN 978-1-60908-049-5)

=== Standalone novels ===
- After Hello (September 2012, Shadow Mountain, ISBN 978-1-60907-010-6)

=== Anthologies ===
Mangum edited the following anthologies:

- One Horn to Rule Them All (August 2014, WordFire Press, ISBN 978-1-61475-192-2)
- A Game of Horns (September 2015, WordFire Press, ISBN 978-1-61475-352-0)
- Dragon Writers (October 2016, WordFire Press, ISBN 978-1-61475-476-3)
- Undercurrents (March 2018, WordFire Press, ISBN 978-1-61475-676-7)
- X Marks the Spot (January 2020, WordFire Press, ISBN 978-1-68057-056-4)
- Hold Your Fire (February 2021, WordFire Press, ISBN 978-1-68057-176-9)
- Eat, Drink, and Be Wary (February 2022, WordFire Press, ISBN 978-1-68057-295-7)
- A Bit of Luck: Alternate Histories in Honor of Eric Flint (February 2024, WordFire Press, ISBN 978-1-68057-613-9)

=== Short fiction ===
- "Sold Out" in The Gruff Variations: Writing for Charity Anthology, Vol. 1 edited by Eric James Stone (March 2012, Writing for Charity, ebook only)
- "The Sirens' Song" in All Hallow's Eve Collection edited by Julie Ogborn, Lisa Shepherd, Jennie Stevens, and Cassidy Wadsworth (August 2015, Mirror Press, ISBN 978-1-941145-56-2)
- "Power Surge" in Heroic: Tales of the Extraordinary edited by Blake Casselman (September 2015, Dan Farr Productions, ISBN 978-1-5173-2827-6)

=== Nonfiction ===
Saving Stories, Hunting Themes, The Writing Business series

- Writing Tips from 300 Episodes of Supernatural, Volume One, Seasons 1-8 (2019, Colored Paper Clips, no ISBN)
- Writing Tips from 300 Episodes of Supernatural, Volume Two, Seasons 9-14 (2019, Colored Paper Clips, no ISBN)

== Awards ==
Mangum has received multiple awards and nominations for her works.

Year	Organization	Award title, Category	Work	Result	Refs
2009	Foreword Reviews	Foreword Reviews INDIES; Best Young Adult Fiction	The Hourglass Door	Gold Winner	
2010	Foreword Reviews	Foreword Reviews INDIES; Best Young Adult Fiction	The Golden Spiral	Gold Winner	
2011	Foreword Reviews	Foreword Reviews INDIES; Best Young Adult Fiction	The Forgotten Locket	Nominated	
2012	LDStorymakers	Whitney Awards, Best Young Adult General Novel	After Hello	Won	
2019	LDStorymakers	Whitney Awards, Outstanding Achievement	-	Won	
