= Traci Hunter Abramson =

American novelist

- Born: Arizona, U.S.
- Education: Brigham Young University
- Occupation: Author
- Notable work: Smokescreen, Codeword
- Style: Mystery fiction, thriller, LDS fiction
- Awards: Whitney Award: Failsafe, 2015; Deep Cover, 2013; Codeword, 2012
- Website: https://www.traciabramson.com

Traci Hunter Abramson is an American mystery and suspense novelist. Her books have received Whitney Awards for best mystery/suspense novel in 2012, 2013, and 2015. Her books often feature characters involved with the FBI or CIA, inspired by her time working for the CIA. Abramson's books are known for featuring characters who are members of the Church of Jesus Christ of Latter-day Saints characters and she has a large following among readers who are members of that Church.

== Education and background ==
Abramson grew up in Arizona and lives in Stafford, Virginia. She joined the Church of Jesus Christ of Latter-day Saints when she was twelve years old. She studied business at Brigham Young University and worked for the CIA for six years, from the late 1980s to 1995. Abramson is married and has five children. She has coached the North Stafford High School swim team for over 20 seasons.

== Writing ==
Many of Abramson's novels feature FBI agents or CIA officers, and she bases her books on similar situations she encountered working for the CIA as a finance officer. Since she is a former CIA employee, books that mention the CIA are reviewed by the agency to ensure that they do not reveal confidential material. Many of her characters are members of The Church of Jesus Christ of Latter-day Saints and her novels have an enthusiastic fan base among Mormon readers. Abramson's first book, Undercurrents, featured an Olympic-hopeful swimmer who is in witness protection. The Virginia Tech shooting inspired Abramson to write Lockdown, a novel about a woman who survives a school shooting. She said the process of writing the novel helped her to heal from the trauma.

Critics have praised Abramson's research and believable and likeable characters, though some of her plots have been criticized as predictable.

== Awards ==
Abramson received the novel of the year Whitney award in 2017 for Safe House. Abramson received the best mystery/suspense Whitney Award in 2017 also for Safe House, in 2015 for Failsafe, in 2013 for Deep Cover, and in 2012 for Codeword Six other of her books have been finalists for the award: The Deep End in 2007, Royal Target and Freefall in 2008, Lockdown in 2009, Crossfire in 2010, and Smokescreen in 2011.

Smokescreen was on Deseret Book's bestseller list for the end of 2010, and Code Word was a Deseret Book top-10 bestseller in 2012.

== Bibliography ==
=== Undercurrents trilogy ===
- Undercurrents (2004) ISBN 9781591564249
- Ripple Effect (2005) ISBN 9781591567448
- The Deep End (2007) ISBN 9781598111996

=== Saint Squad series ===
- Freefall (2008) ISBN 9781598115109
- Lockdown (2009) ISBN 9781598115840
- Crossfire (2010) ISBN 9781598119435
- Backlash (2010) ISBN 9781598119879
- Smokescreen (2011) ISBN 9781608611836
- Code Word (2012) ISBN 9781621081883
- Lock and Key (2013) ISBN 9781621085393
- Drop Zone (2014) ISBN 9781621088738
- Spotlight (2015) ISBN 9781680476187
- Tripwire (2018) ISBN 9781524405359
- Redemption (2021) ISBN 9781524417529
- Covert Ops (2023) ISBN 9781524423223
- Disconnect (2024) ISBN 9781524422547
- Reconnect (2025) ISBN 9781524427900

=== Royals series ===
- Royal Target (2011) ISBN 9781598116281
- Royal Secrets (2012) ISBN 9781608618682
- Royal Brides (2016) ISBN 9781524400071
- Royal Heir (2020) ISBN 9781524411282
- Royal Duty (2024) ISBN 9781524425388
- Royal Intrigue (2025) ISBN 9781524428075

=== Guardian series ===
- Failsafe (2015) ISBN 9781680470307
- Safe House (2017) ISBN 9781524402754
- Sanctuary (2019) ISBN 9781524407391
- On The Run (2020) ISBN 9781524412487
- In Harm's Way (2021) ISBN 9781524414672
- Not Dead Yet (2022) ISBN 9781524419875
- Unseen (2023) ISBN 9781524423797

=== Dream's Edge series ===
- Dancing to Freedom (2021) ISBN 9781524415198
- An Unlikely Pair (2021) ISBN 9781524417048
- Broken Dreams (2021) ISBN 9781524419677
- Dreams of Gold (2022) ISBN 9781524418908
- The Best Mistake (2022) ISBN 9781524422417
- Worlds Collide (2023) ISBN 9781524422615

=== Falcon Point series ===
- Heirs of Falcon Point (2021) ISBN 9781524417048 (co-authored with Sian Ann Bessey, Paige Edwards, and A.L. Sowards)
- The Danger with Diamonds (2022) ISBN 9781524421205 (co-authored with Sian Ann Bessey)
- From an Unknown Sender (2023) ISBN 9781524424602 (co-authored with Sian Ann Bessey)
- When Fashion Turns Deadly (2024) ISBN 9781524427139 (co-authored with Sian Ann Bessey)

=== Luke Steele series ===
- Hometown Vendetta (2024) ISBN 9781639932986
- Victim #8 ISBN 9781639934348 (scheduled release date Oct. 7th, 2025)

=== Pen & Dagger series ===
- Novel Threat (2025) ISBN 9781639933846
- Staged Evidence ISBN 9781639934737 (scheduled release date Apr. 7th, 2026)

=== Standalone novels ===
- Obsession (2011) ISBN 9781608613922
- Deep Cover (2013) ISBN 9781621083689
- Chances Are (2014) ISBN 9781621086925
- Kept Secrets (2016) ISBN 9781524401092
- Chance for Home (2017) ISBN 9781524401887
- Proximity (2018) ISBN 9781524406820
- Mistaken Reality (2019) ISBN 9781524409418
- A Change of Fortune (2020) ISBN 978-1524412395
- Jim and Katherine (2024) ISBN 9781524425715

=== Anthologies ===
- Twisted Fate (2014) ISBN 9781621085331
- Entangled (2019) ISBN 9781524410889
- Sinister Secrets (2022) ISBN 9781524422134
- Shadows of Trust (2025) ISBN 9781524428389

=== Non-Fiction Books ===
- The Fiction Kitchen Trio Cookbook (2023) ISBN 9781524421335
