= Betsy Brannon Green =

American novelist

- Born: June 1, 1958 (age 67) Salt Lake City, Utah, U.S.
- Occupation: Novelist
- Genre: Mystery fiction
- Spouse: Robert Green (m. 1979)
- Children: 8

Betsy Brannon Green (born June 1, 1958) is a Latter Day Saint mystery/suspense novelist. She is a member of the Church of Jesus Christ of Latter-day Saints.

== Biography ==
Green was born in Salt Lake City, Utah, and grew up moving all over the country, since her father was in the US Army. In 1979, she married Robert Green, and they currently live in Bessemer, Alabama. They are the parents of eight children. Green's fiction is inspired by the people of Headland, Alabama. Green started writing in 1999 and Covenant Communications published her debut, Hearts in Hiding, in 2001.

== Criticism ==
In 2012, the audiobook version of Murder by the Way was in Deseret Book's top five bestsellers for June 25–30. Reviewing the book in Deseret News, Alicia Cunningham wrote that while the mystery was predictable it was entertaining. Writing on LDS Fiction, Penny Bowler called books like Green's the "comfort food" of literature. Murder by Design was a top-10 bestseller from Deseret Book for the October 17 to October 23 sales interval. In a review for LDS Magazine, Jennie Hansen wrote that Proceed With Caution was "difficult [...] to put down" with realistic dialogue. Mike Whitmer praised the sequel, Danger Ahead (2015) for its lack of sexual content and graphic violence. Sharon Haddock wrote that Puzzle Pieces (2016) was convoluted, with an implausible ending and "simple outcomes."

== Awards ==
Green's books have been finalists four times for the Whitney award for best mystery/suspense novel; in 2010 for Murder By Design, in 2009 for Murder by the Book, in 2008 for Above and Beyond and in 2007 for Hazardous Duty In 2008, Green was voted the 8th-most-popular writer by readers of the Deseret News.

== Works ==
The following books are published by Covenant Communications in American Fork, Utah.

=== Order of Haggerty series ===
- —— (2001). Hearts in Hiding. ISBN 1-57734-823-0.
- —— (2002). Until Proven Guilty. ISBN 1-59156-061-6.
- —— (2003). Above Suspicion. ISBN 1-59156-310-0.
- —— (2004). Silenced. ISBN 1-59156-602-9.
- —— (2005). Copycat. ISBN 1-59156-920-6.
- —— (2005). Poison. ISBN 1-59811-037-3.
- —— (2006). Double Cross. ISBN 1-59811-105-1.
- —— (2006). Christmas in Haggerty. ISBN 1-59156-896-X.
- —— (2007). Backtrack. ISBN 978-1-59811-339-6.
- —— (2015). Puzzle Pieces. ISBN 9781680478655.

=== Order of Eureka series ===
- —— (2002). Never Look Back. ISBN 1-57734-982-2.
- —— (2003). Don't Close Your Eyes. ISBN 1-59156-188-4.
- —— (2004). Foul Play. ISBN 9781591565123.

=== Order of Duty series ===
- —— (2007). Hazardous Duty. ISBN 9781598114454.
- —— (2008). Above and Beyond. ISBN 9781598117141.
- —— (2009). Code of Honor. ISBN 9781598117158.

=== Kennedy Killingsworth mysteries ===
- —— (2009). Murder by the Book. ISBN 9781598119381.
- —— (2010). Murder by Design. ISBN 9781608610990.
- —— (2012). Murder by the Way. ISBN 9781621081234.

=== Proceed with Caution series ===
- —— (2013). Proceed With Caution. ISBN 9781621083665.
- —— (2014). Danger Ahead. ISBN 9781621088912.
