= Carla Kelly =

American writer (born 1947)

- Born: Carla Sue Kelly; 1947 (age 78–79); United States
- Occupations: novelist; short story writer; historian; columnist
- Spouse: Martin Kelly
- Writing career
- Period: 1978–present
- Genres: romance; historical fiction; history
- Notable works: Mrs. Drew Plays Her Hand, The Lady's Companion
- Notable awards: Rita Award; Spur Award; Whitney Award; Career Achievement Award – Romantic Times, 1994-95
- Website: www.carlakellyauthor.com

Carla Sue Kelly (born 1947) is an American writer in the Regency romance genre. She is the author of over forty books and short stories and is a two time winner of the Romance Writers of America's RITA Award.

Kelly is known for what she calls "dukeless" regencies, her stories often revolve around ordinary people solving their own problems. She also has a strong interest in the American West, which is reflected in her earliest published works and in her non-fiction. Since 2011, Kelly, who has a Mormon background, has written five historical romance novels that focus on the lives of young Mormon women: Borrowed Light, Enduring Light, My Loving Vigil Keeping, Safe Passage, and One Step Enough.

== Biography ==
Kelly was born in 1947 and is the daughter of a Navy officer. She graduated from Brigham Young University in Provo, Utah where she studied Latin American history. She completed a master's degree at the University of Louisiana-Monroe, in American history, with a focus on the Civil War and Indian Wars. Kelly lives in Idaho Falls, Idaho with her husband.

== Writing career ==
Kelly began writing Regency Romances because of her interest in the Napoleonic Wars (1803-1815). A major theme in her books is how war touches the lives of ordinary people.

Kelly has also written a series of short stories about the men, women and children of Fort Laramie during the Indian Wars era of American history. In 2003 her entire collection of Indian War stories was re-published in Here's to the Ladies: Stories from the Frontier Army.

== Bibliography ==
=== Benedict Nesbitt series ===
- Libby's London Merchant (1991)
- One Good Turn (2001)

=== Channel Fleet trilogy ===
- Marrying the Captain (2009)
- The Surgeon's Lady (2009)
- Marrying the Royal Marine (2010)

=== Borrowed Light series ===
- Borrowed Light (2011)
- Enduring Light (2012)

=== Spanish Brand series ===
- Double Cross (2013)
- Marco and the Devil's Bargain (2014)
- Paloma and the Horse Traders (2015)
- The Star in the Meadow (2017)

=== Stand-alone novels ===
- Daughter of Fortune (1985)
- Summer Campaign (1989)
- Miss Chartley's Guided Tour (1989)
- Marian's Christmas Wish (1989)
- Mrs. McVinnie's London Season (1990)
- Miss Grimsley's Oxford Career (1992)
- Miss Billings Treads the Boards (1993)
- Miss Whittier Makes a List (1994)
- Mrs. Drew Plays Her Hand (1994)
- Reforming Lord Ragsdale (1995)
- The Lady's Companion (1996)
- With This Ring (1997)
- Miss Milton Speaks Her Mind (1998)
- The Wedding Journey (2002)
- Beau Crusoe (2007)
- The Admiral's Penniless Bride (2010)
- Coming Home for Christmas (2011)
- Marriage of Mercy (2012)
- My Loving Vigil Keeping (2012)
- Her Hesitant Heart (2013)
- Safe Passage (2013)
- The Wedding Ring Quest (2014)
- Softly Falling (2014)
- Doing No Harm (2015)
- Courting Carrie in Wonderland (2017)
- The Unlikely Master Genius (2018)
- One Step Enough (2018)

=== Short stories ===
This list excludes articles written in her capacity of journalist or feature writer for various newspapers and magazines, primarily in North Dakota.

- A Season for Heroes. FAR West Magazine, 1978
- Kathleen Flaherty's Long Winter. FAR West Magazine, 1981
- Something New in Wedding Bouquet. Signet, 1996
- Make a Joyful Noise in A Regency Christmas Carol. Signet, 1997
- The Christmas Ornament in A Regency Christmas. Signet, 1998
- An Object of Charity in A Regency Christmas Present. Signet, 1999
- The Background Man in The Grand Hotel. Signet, 2000
- The Three Kings in The Regency Christmas II. Signet, 2000
- The Buffalo Carcass on the Company Sink: Sanitation at a Frontier Army Fort. North Dakota History: Journal of the Northern Plains. Vol. 69, 2002
- The Light Within in A Regency Valentine II. Signet, 2002
- No Room at the Inn in The Regency Christmas IX. Signet, 2002
- Here's to the Ladies: Stories of the Frontier Army. Texas Christian University Press, 2003
- Let Nothing You Dismay in Regency Christmas Wishes. Signet, 2003
- 'To Restore these Children': Fort Totten's Preventorium, 1935–1940. Northern Great Plains History Conference (2004: Bismarck, North Dakota)
- A Hasty Marriage in Wedding Belles. Signet, 2004
- On the Upper Missouri: The Journal of Rudolph Friedrich Kurz, 1851–1852. University of Oklahoma Press, 2005 (Editor)
- An Object of Charity in A Homespun Regency Christmas. Signet, 2008 Note: re-issue of short story published originally in A Regency Christmas Present. Signet, 1999
- "Christmas Promise" in "A Regency Christmas." Harlequin, October 2009
- Carla Kelly's Christmas Collection (Cedar Fort, Inc., from Signet reprints), October 2013
- In Love and War (Cedar Fort, Inc., from Signet reprints), November 2013
- Season's Regency Greetings: Two Christmas Novellas, November 2014
- All Regency Collection (A Timeless Romance Anthology Book 10, January 2015)
- "Christmas Eve Proposal" in It Happened One Christmas (2015)
- "Christmas Dance with the Rancher" in Western Christmas Proposals (2016)
- For This We Are Soldiers: Tales of the Frontier Army (2016)
- A Season of Love (2017)
- "Captain Grey's Christmas Proposal" in Regency Christmas Wishes (2017)

== Awards and reception ==
- 1995 - Romance Writers of America RITA Award, Regency Romance – Mrs. Drew Plays Her Hand
- 1997 - Romance Writers of America RITA Award, Regency Romance – The Lady's Companion

A Season for Heroes and Kathleen Flaherty's Long Winter were also awarded Spur Awards from the Western Writers of America.
