= Douglas H. Thayer =

American novelist

- Born: April 19, 1929; Salt Lake City, Utah, U.S.
- Died: October 17, 2017 (aged 88)
- Education: Brigham Young University; Stanford University; University of Iowa (MFA)
- Occupation: Author
- Spouse: Donlu DeWitt (m. 1974)
- Children: 6

Douglas H. Thayer (April 19, 1929 – October 17, 2017) was a prominent author in the "faithful realism" movement of Mormon fiction. He has been called the "Mormon Hemingway" for his straightforward style and powerful prose. Eugene England called him the "father of contemporary Mormon fiction."

Thayer grew up in Provo, Utah, and dropped out of high school to join the army in 1946. He served a mission for the Church of Jesus Christ of Latter-day Saints (LDS Church) in Germany. He studied at Brigham Young University (BYU) for a bachelor's degree in English and received a Master's in American literature from Stanford. He also received an MFA in fiction writing from the University of Iowa. He taught fiction writing at BYU for fifty-four years and retired in 2011.

In the 1960s, Thayer started to publish short stories in BYU Studies and Dialogue. His first novel, Summer Fire, was published in 1983. Critics with the Mormon fiction movement praise Thayer's literary coming-of-age stories and their exploration of the Mormon masculine psyche. His work has received multiple awards from the Association of Mormon Letters (AML) and other organizations, and he received lifetime achievement awards from AML and the Whitney Awards. He was an active member of The Church of Jesus Christ of Latter-day Saints his whole life, and had six children with his wife, Donlu.

== Biography ==
Thayer was born in Salt Lake City 1929. His single mother raised him in Provo, Utah, where he spent his boyhood running free and hunting, fishing, and hiking in the surrounding Wasatch Mountains. He dropped out of high school in 1946 to join the U.S. Army, serving in Germany. He later returned to Germany as a missionary for LDS Church. After graduating from BYU with a bachelor's degree in English, Thayer applied to law school, but then decided not to attend and started a doctorate in American literature at Stanford. Finding that he had little interest in research, he left the program after finishing a master's degree. Returning to Provo from Stanford, Thayer taught briefly in the BYU English Department, considered studying to be a clinical psychologist, and then started a doctorate in American studies at the University of Maryland. His dislike of research led him to pursue his interest in writing. He transferred to the University of Iowa, and finished an MFA in fiction writing.

After completing his MFA, Thayer returned to BYU, where he taught fiction writing and other classes for fifty-four years before retiring in 2011. At BYU he was Coordinator of Composition, Director of Creative Writing, Associate Chair in the English Department, and Associate Dean of the College of Humanities. As a teacher, Thayer influenced John Bennion, Levi S. Peterson, Brandon Sanderson, Orson Scott Card, and Brandon Mull.

== Works and reception ==
Thayer began publishing stories in BYU Studies and Dialogue during the 1960s. Thayer's writing process consisted of writing a draft from notes, then taking more notes during the draft and incorporating these notes into subsequent drafts. A short story went through over ten drafts, while a novel took between six and eight drafts.

Thayer is perhaps best known for his coming-of-age stories. Andrew Hall, a frequent blogger and secretary for the Association for Mormon Letters, called him the "finest chronicler of the Mormon youth in the culture." Richard Cracroft called his memoir Hooligan a future classic of Mormon literature. Michael Austin, a former English professor at University of Evansville and regular contributor to By Common Consent, described Thayer as the first LDS writer to bridge the gap between "coming from a position of faith" and writing "well-crafted" literature. Scott Hales, a specialist in Mormon literature, noted that Thayer's short stories usually explore the "fragile psyche of Mormon men" who wear their gender roles "like an ill-fitting shirt." In 1974, Karl Keller praised Thayer for using "concrete, worldly symbols" to articulate his faith, but stated that his work did not go as far as creating a world where Mormon theology was "concretely true." In 1987, Bruce W. Jorgensen, an English professor at BYU, postulated that Thayer's stories in Under the Cottonwoods followed a consistent pattern taken from Romantic lyric poetry, where the story follows "a male protagonist through some brief, decisive interval in his life."

== Awards ==
His prizes and awards for his work include Dialogue prizes for the short story and essay, the P. A. Christensen award, the Karl G. Maeser Creative Arts Award, and the Utah Institute of Fine Arts Award in the Short Story. He received the 2011 Lifetime Achievement Award from the Whitney Awards. Thayer has received many awards from the Association for Mormon Letters (AML). He won the 1977 Short Story Award for stories in Under the Cottonwoods and the Short Fiction Award in 2011 for Wasatch. He received the Novel Award for Summer Fire in 1983 and for The Conversion of Jeff Williams in 2003. He was awarded an honorary membership to AML in 1988, and received the Smith-Petit Foundation Award for Outstanding Contribution to Mormon Letters in 2008. As a recognition of Thayer's contributions to his community, Provo mayor Lewis Billings named Thayer's seventy-fifth birthday "Douglas Thayer Day".

== Personal life ==
In 1974, Thayer married Donlu DeWitt (born 1948). Donlu holds bachelor's, master's, and law degrees from Brigham Young University and has taught writing in the BYU English Department and Honors Program. A member of the Utah State Bar, she has been a freelance writer/editor and a certified mediator with specialized training in family mediation and high-risk victim/offender dialogue. Until her retirement at the end of 2019, Donlu was the Publications Director for the International Center for Law and Religion Studies at Brigham Young University's J. Reuben Clark Law School. Doug and Donlu have six children, six children-in-law, and twenty-one grandchildren.

A lifelong member of the LDS Church, Doug Thayer held a local office of seventy after his mission until 1974, when local seventies were discontinued. He was part of committees to write lessons in the LDS Church and served in his local bishopric and on two high councils. He also was active in his local Boy Scouting troop, serving on Scout committee meetings into his old age.

Thayer died of liver cancer on October 17, 2017.

== Works ==
=== Short story collections ===
- Under the Cottonwoods and Other Mormon Stories (1977)
- Mr. Wahlquist in Yellowstone (1989)
- Wasatch: Mormon Stories and a Novella (2011)

=== Novels ===
- Summer Fire (1983)
- Greg & Kellie (1991) [with Donlu Thayer]
- The Conversion of Jeff Williams (2003)
- The Tree House (2009)
- Will Wonders Never Cease: A Hopeful Novel for Mormon Mothers and Their Teenage Sons (2014)

=== Memoir ===
- Hooligan: A Mormon Boyhood (2007)
