= Gale Sears =

American author

Gale Sears is an American author specializing in historical fiction. She has various Whitney Awards for her works. She is also a member of the Church of Jesus Christ of Latter-day Saints.

== Early life ==
Gale Sears was born in Lake Tahoe, California. She later moved to Honolulu, Hawaii, where she attended President William McKinley High School. Sears graduated from Brigham Young University with a bachelor's degree in playwriting. She later received a master's degree in theater arts from the University of Minnesota. She is a member of the Church of Jesus Christ of Latter-day Saints. She married George Sears. The couple has two children and lives in Salt Lake City.

== Career ==
Sears started writing plays when she was in college. Her first novel was not published until 1997. She specializes in historical fiction. She chooses to write her books out by hand. Many of her books center around female protagonists. Her novels often feature elements of Mormonism and Beliefs and practices of The Church of Jesus Christ of Latter-day Saints. She often juxtaposes church principles and government ideologies.

In order to write her books, she spends hundreds of hours researching historical events and various cultures. In order to stay organized, she divides her research into folders. Sears was inspired to write her book The Silence of God after reading a magazine article about the Lindlofs, a family of Latter-day Saints in Russia.

== Awards ==
Sears has won several Whitney Awards in Mormon Literature. Her novel Letters in the Jade Dragon Box won a 2011 Whitney Award in Historical Fiction. In 2007, Upon the Mountains was a finalist for a Whitney Award in Best Novel of the Year as well as in Best Historical Fiction. Her book The Route was nominated for a Whitney Award in Best General Fiction in 2009. The Silence of God was a finalist in Historical Fiction in 2010, and her book Belonging to Heaven was a finalist for a Whitney Award in Historical Fiction in 2013.

== Selected publications ==
- Belonging to Heaven: A Historical Novel (2013)
- The Missing Christmas Treasure (2012)
- Letters in the Jade Dragon Box: A Historical Novel (2011)
- The Silence of God (2010)
- The Route (2009)
- Upon the Mountains (2007)
- Until the Dawn (2006)
- Autumn Sky (2004)
