= Heather B. Moore =

American novelist

Heather B. Moore (also writing as H. B. Moore) is an American writer of fiction, notably romance, thriller, fantasy, LDS, and historical (especially scriptural) novels, as well as nonfiction on religious and family topics.

== Biography ==
Heather B. Moore's father is professor S. Kent Brown. She is a member of The Church of Jesus Christ of Latter-day Saints. Moore attended Brigham Young University, where she majored in fashion merchandizing and minored in business management.

Among the awards and distinctions her work has received or placed in include Best of State (Utah) winners, Whitney Awards, and the League of Utah Writers awards. In 2013, she received the 2013 Trumpet Award from her publisher Covenant Communications for sales over 100,000; and in 2014 she was recognized by USA Today as a bestselling author.

She writes historical thrillers as H. B. Moore so "men will buy her books." She co-wrote the book, Divinity of Women: Inspiration and Insights From Women of the Scriptures (2014) with her father S. Kent Brown. The historical fiction novel, The Paper Daughters of Chinatown (2020) by Moore includes a fictionalized depiction of Donaldina Cameron.
