= Lindsey Leavitt =

American novelist

- Born: August 17, 1980 (age 46); Las Vegas, Nevada, U.S.
- Education: Bonanza High School; Brigham Young University
- Occupation: Author
- Writing career
- Genres: Children's books, Young adult, novels
- Website: lindseyleavitt.com

Lindsey Taylor Leavitt (born August 17, 1980) is an American author of young adult, Middle Grade novels, including the Princess for Hire Series, and juvenile fiction (the Commander in Cheese Series).

== Biography ==
=== Life and early career ===
Lindsey Leavitt was born and grew up in Las Vegas, Nevada. She is the second of five children and graduated from Bonanza High School. She later went on to attend Brigham Young University where she studied to be an elementary school teacher. Leavitt stopped teaching and became a substitute teacher when her oldest daughter was born. While pregnant, Leavitt wrote what would later become Sean Griswold's Head. Leavitt then wrote the Princess for Hire series.

=== Writing career ===
Leavitt has published three Young Adult books, five middle grade novels (two with Robin Mellom), and five early chapter books (with illustrator A. G. Ford). Leavitt has also won numerous awards for her books including the YALSA Best Fiction for Young Adults, YALSA Popular Paperbacks for Young Adults, an Amazon Best Book of the Year, Kids’ Indies Next List, & Banks Street Best Children’s Books of the Year.

Leavitt is a full-time author and lives with her large blended family in Utah.

== Bibliography ==
=== Willis Wilbur series ===
- Willis Wilbur Wows the World (2022)
- Wills Wilbur Meets His Match (2022)

=== Princess for Hire series ===
- Princess for Hire (Princess for Hire #1) (2010)
- The Royal Treatment (Princess for Hire #2) (2011)
- A Farewell to Charms (Princess for Hire #3) (2012)

=== Standalone ===
- Sean Griswold's Head (2011)
- Going Vintage (2013)
- The Chapel Wars (2014)

=== The Pages Between Us ===
- The Pages Between Us (2017) (with Robin Mellom)
- The Pages Between Us : In the Spotlight (2017) (with Robin Mellom)

=== Commander in Cheese series ===
- Commander in Cheese #1: The Big Move (2016), illustrated by Ag Ford
- Commander in Cheese #2: Oval Office Escape (2016), illustrated by Ag Ford
- Commander in Cheese #3: Have a Mice Flight! (2016), illustrated by Ag Ford
- Commander in Cheese #4: The Birthday Suit (2017), illustrated by Ag Ford
- Commander in Cheese Super Special #1: Mouse Rushmore (2017), illustrated by Ag Ford
