= Adrienne Monson =

American writer (born 1983)

- Born: July 27, 1983 (age 43); Utah, United States
- Occupations: Novelist, travel writer
- Writing career
- Period: 2013–present
- Genres: Fantasy, Paranormal Romance, Urban Fantasy
- Notable work: Dissension
- Website: adriennemonson.com

Adrienne Monson (born July 27, 1983) is an American writer.

== Biography ==
A Utah native, Monson currently resides in American Fork, Utah. She was the winner of 2009 Oquirrh Writers contest and placed in the 2010 Utah RWA's Great Beginnings contest.

Monson was married in 2005, and has two children. She is writing book three in the Blood Inheritance Trilogy.

== Writing ==
Monson published her first novel, Dissension, through Jolly Fish Press on February 23, 2013, to generally positive reviews.

This is book one in The Blood Inheritance Trilogy.

== Selected works ==
- Dissension (2013)

=== Short works ===
- Convoluted (2012)
- Death by Proxy (2012)
