= Anita Stansfield =

American Latter-day Saint romance novelist (b.1961)

- Born: July 20, 1961 (age 65); Provo, Utah, U.S.
- Occupation: Novelist
- Writing career
- Pen name: Anita Stansfield; Elizabeth D. Michaels
- Period: 1994–present
- Genres: contemporary romance, historical romance
- Website: www.anitastansfield.com

Anita Stansfield (born July 20, 1961) is an American Latter-day Saint romance novelist. She is the LDS market's best-selling romance novelist, with sales of nearly half a million.

Stansfield was born in Provo, Utah. She currently lives in Alpine, Utah with her husband and five children.

She has published many novels since her first publication in 1994, as well as a collection of personal essays, most of which are oriented toward Latter-day Saint readers. Many of her works have been published by Covenant Communications in American Fork, Utah, although she now self-publishes through her own company, Crosswalk Books. She is also an occasional public speaker at local events for LDS women as well as firesides for young men and young women.

Stansfield is a former president of the Utah Valley Chapter of the League of Utah Writers. She has also won the Independent LDS Booksellers' "Best Fiction Award" for her first published book, First Love and Forever. She has also won the League of Utah Writers' "Golden Quill" award multiple times, as well as Covenant Communications' 1997 special award for "Pioneering New Ground in LDS Fiction." In 2007, she won the Lifetime Achievement award from the Whitney Awards program.
