= John Brown (American author) =

American novelist

John D. Brown
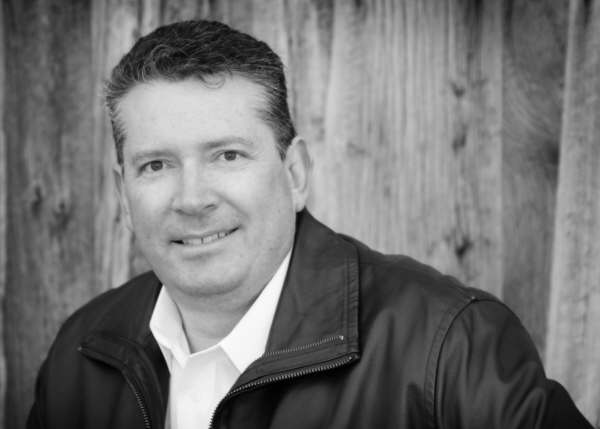
- Author John D. Brown
- Born: John D. Brown; 1966 (age 59–60); Utah, U.S.
- Education: Brigham Young University (BA)
- Occupation: Writer
- Writing career
- Genres: Thrillers, Epic Fantasy
- Website: johndbrown.com

John D. Brown (born 1966) is an American author who writes thrillers and epic fantasy.

== Personal life ==
Brown was born in Utah and spent many years working in his family's floral and nursery business. He served as a missionary for the Church of Jesus Christ of Latter-day Saints in the Netherlands and Belgium and graduated from Brigham Young University with a Bachelor of Arts degree in English and a master's degree in Accountancy. After college, Brown began working in the tech industry and continues to work in the ERP software sector as a business consultant and education manager. He currently lives in Laketown, Utah, a ranching environment that inspired one of the core ideas in his debut novel.

== Writing career ==
Brown explored writing as a student at BYU, studying with Darrell Spencer, Leslie Norris, Bruce Jorgensen, and Peter Macuck. After attending a transformational writing workshop offered by Dave Wolverton, he began to submit his stories for publication. In 1996 he won a quarterly first prize in the annual Writers of the Future contest and published his first piece of fiction. His short story "The Scent of Desire" appeared in the contest's 1997 anthology of winners under the pseudonym Bo Griffin.

In 2002 he attended his second pivotal workshop: Orson Scott Card's Literary Boot Camp. After that workshop, Brown began to turn again to writing for publication, this time focusing on novels. In 2008 he signed a three-book contract with Tor Books for an epic fantasy series which begins with Servant of a Dark God.

== Bibliography ==
=== Thrillers ===
- Brown, John (2013). Bad Penny. ISBN 978-1-9404-2705-8.
- Brown, John (2016). Awful Intent. ISBN 978-1-9404-2713-3.

=== Epic Fantasy ===
==== Dark God series ====
- Brown, John (2009). Servant of a Dark God. ISBN 978-0-7653-2235-7.
- Brown, John (2013). Servant: The Dark God, Book 1. ISBN 978-1-9404-2703-4.
- Brown, John (2014). Curse: The Dark God, Book 2. ISBN 978-1-9404-2708-9.
- Brown, John (2014). Raveler: The Dark God, Book 3. ISBN 978-1-9404-2710-2.

==== The Drovers series ====
- Brown, John (2019). Prey: The Drovers, Book 1. ISBN 978-1-9404-2719-5.
- Brown, John (2020). Outlaws: The Drovers, Book 2. ISBN 978-1-9404-2721-8.
- Brown, John (2022). Sura: The Drovers, Book 3. ISBN 978-1-940427-23-2.

=== Science fiction ===
- Brown, John; Correia, Larry (2021). Gun Runner. ISBN 978-1-9821-2516-5.

=== Short stories ===
- "The Scent of Desire" (published under pen name Bo Griffin in Hubbard, La Fayette Ron (1997). L. Ron Hubbard Presents Writers of the Future volume 13. ISBN 978-1-57318-064-1.)
- "Loose in the Wires" (published in InterGalactic Medicine Show issue 1. 2005.)
- "Bright Waters" (published in Lady Churchill's Rosebud Wristlet issue 17. 2005.)
- "From the Clay of His Heart" (published in InterGalactic Medicine Show issue 8. 2008.)

=== Nonfiction ===
- Brown, John (2020). Create Story Ideas That Beg to Be Written. ISBN 978-1-9404-2724-9.
- "The Key Conditions for Suspense". 2010., a 27-part series for the Science Fiction and Fantasy Writers Association

== Awards ==
- 1997 "The Scent of Desire": Writers of the Future, First Prize, 1997 (as Bo Griffin)
- 2010 Servant of a Dark God: Whitney Awards, Best Speculative Fiction Novel 2009
- 2021 Gun Runner: Dragon Awards, Best Military Science Fiction or Fantasy Novel 2021
