= Annette Lyon =

American novelist

- Born: Annette Luthy; December 18, 1973 (age 52)
- Occupations: Writer and editor
- Spouse: Robert W. Lyon
- Children: 4
- Website: http://www.annettelyon.com/

Annette Lyon (born December 18, 1973) is a USA Today bestselling author. She has written in many different genres, but focuses on women's fiction, with her target audience including members of the Church of Jesus Christ of Latter-day Saints (LDS Church). She is the recipient of the Utah Best of State Award for Fictional Writing as well as the Silver Quill Award.

== Biography ==
Annette Lyon was born to Melvin J. and Anne Luthy in 1973. She began writing as early as the second grade, typing out stories on her mother's typewriter. She graduated from Brigham Young University in English; her studies focused on 19th-century literature. She married Robert W. Lyon with whom she has four children.

== Career ==
Lyon is a freelance writer and professional editor. She has written novels, novellas, nonfiction books, and articles in her writing career. Lyon submitted her first publication during Labor Day weekend in 1994. Although it was rejected, it marked the start of her writing career.

Lyon targets members of the LDS Church in her writing and includes many themes and insights from Mormon life. She specializes in writing women's fiction.

Lyon worked with authors Sarah M. Eden and Heather B. Moore on the Timeless Romance Anthology. Lyon also collaborated with other writers in the Newport Ladies Book Club. She worked with Josi S. Kilpack, Julie Wright, and Moore to write a nine-book series. Each author writes about a different female character in each book. In order to write cohesive story lines, the authors constantly shared information and drafts back and forth, recreating scenes from one character into the perspective of another. These books were created in order to give a more holistic view on Mormon life and the daily struggles that women face.

Lyon enjoys eating chocolate, and for some time she also helped with the Utah Chocolate Show. She also wrote her own chocolate cookbook.

== Awards ==
Lyon is a USA Today Bestselling Author. She was also awarded the Utah Best of State Award in the fiction category in 2007 and 2013. She also received the Silver Quill Award in 2013 from the League of Utah Writers for her book Paige. Her novel Band of Sisters won the Whitney Award in 2010.

== Select publications ==
=== Novels ===
- Tying the Knot
- Timeless Romance Anthologies
- There, Their, They're
- Done & Done
- A Portrait for Toni
- Ilana's Wish
- Band of Sisters
- Band of Sisters: Coming Home
- Paige
- House on the Hill
- Spires of Stone
- At the Journey's End
- Tower of Strength
- Lost Without You
- At the Water's Edge

=== Articles ===
- "Bravery on the Homefront: Military Wives," Deseret Saints Magazine, July 2007
- "The Invisible Writing Mother" 2009
- "Uncovering Scholarship Money," LDS Living, Sep/Oct 2009
- "Learning to Celebrate 'Me' on Mother's Day," Deseret Saints Magazine
- "Confessions of a Knitting Addict," Knitty Magazine
- "Making the Most of the New Testament in 2007," Deseret Saints Magazine

=== Cookbook ===
- Chocolate Never Faileth
