= Tyler Whitesides =

American writer (born 1987)

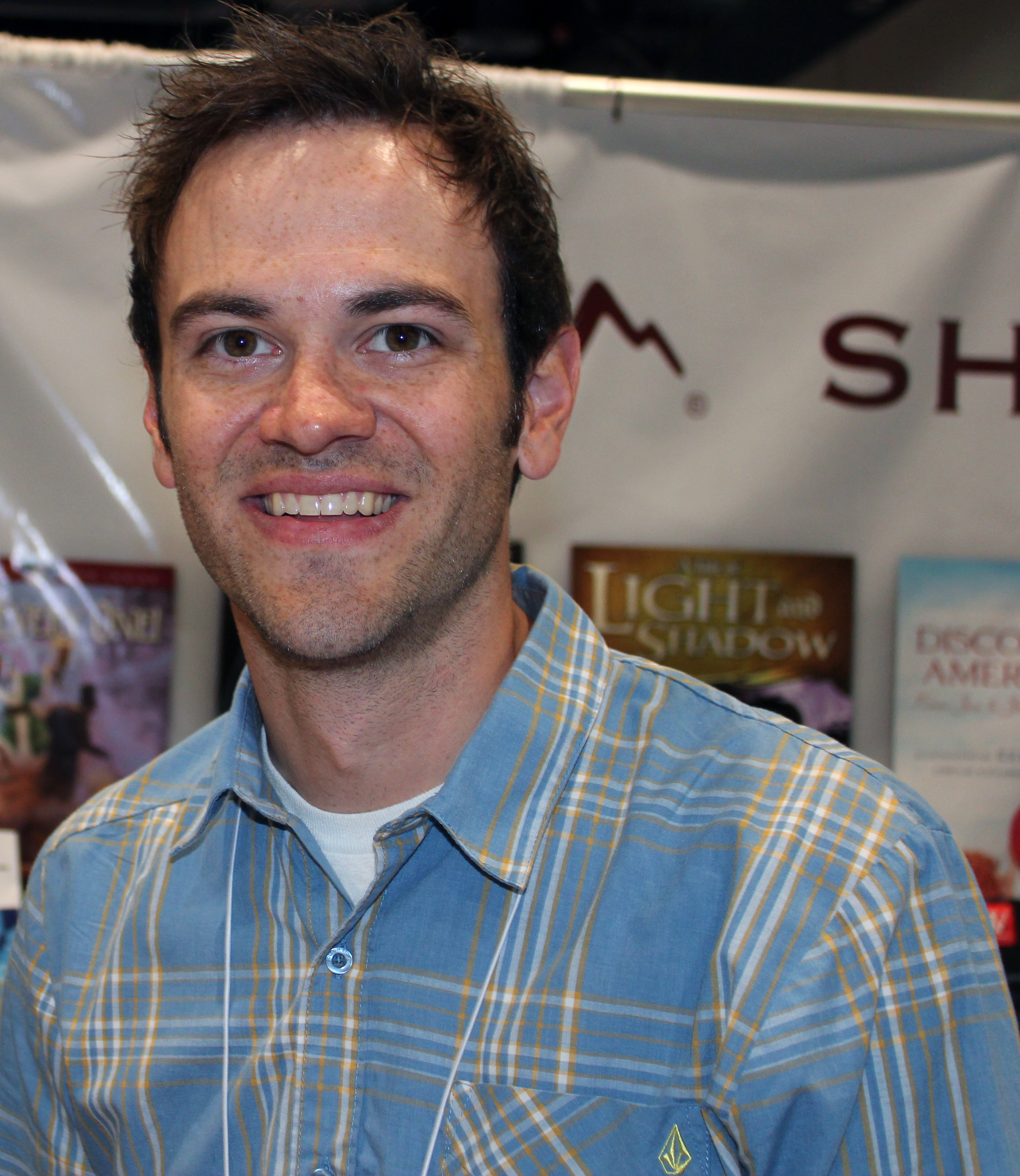
- Whitesides in 2014
- Born: 1987 (age 38–39); Washington, U.S.
- Education: Bachelors in Music
- Alma mater: Utah State University
- Occupation: Author
- Writing career
- Period: 2011–present
- Genres: Young Adult literature Fantasy
- Notable works: Janitors, Secrets of Newforest Academy, Janitors series
- Website: tylerwhitesides.com

Tyler Whitesides (born 1987) is an American writer. He is the author of the middle grade fantasy series Janitors. The series is published by Shadow Mountain Publishing.

== Bibliography ==
Janitors series

- Janitors (September 2011)
- Secrets of New Forest Academy (September 2012)
- Curse of the Broomstaff (September 2013)
- Strike of the Sweepers (September 2014)
- Heroes of the Dustbin (September 2015)

Wishmakers series

- The Wishmakers (February 2018)
- The Wishbreaker (January 2019)

Ardor Benn series

- The Thousand Deaths of Ardor Benn (May 2018)
- The Shattered Realm of Ardor Benn (November 2020)
- The Last Lies of Ardor Benn (December 2020)

Janitors School of Garbage Series(continuation from the Janitors series)

- Janitors School of Garbage (September 2023)
- Trials of the Trash (September 2024)
- War of the Wasteland (September 2025)
