= Coke Newell =

American novelist

Clayton Corey "Coke" Newell is a writer of fiction and nonfiction whose professional career outside of freelance is often defined by his decade-plus stint in public relations for the Church of Jesus Christ of Latter-day Saints.

== Life and career ==
Newell grew up deep in the Colorado mountains south and west of Denver, inspired by his readings of Thoreau, Black Elk and Kerouac. He converted to the LDS faith as a teenager and later served a mission to Colombia.

Research for his first published book, Dying Words: Colombian Journalists and the Cocaine Warlords (1991), was funded by the Scripps Howard Foundation and the InterAmerican Press Association. Composed as a bachelor's degree thesis, it is perhaps the earliest study of the Colombian media's bold (and frequently suicidal) exposure of that nation's militant drug cartels.

After his return, Newell graduated Phi Beta Kappa from the journalism program at Colorado State University and remains a member of the Society of Professional Journalists and the American Society of Journalists and Authors. He later received a master's degree in communications from Montana State University and has a biography in Who's Who in America.

Hired in 1993 as a writer and media relations officer for the LDS Church, his work led to his being quoted in "thousands" of media outlets and the opportunity to write Latter Days : A Guided Tour Through Six Billion Years of Mormonism for St. Martin's Press. The book performed well nationally, perhaps in part due to the national prominence of frequently interviewed church president Gordon B. Hinckley and Newell's own iconoclastic writing style.

His 2007 autobiographical novel On the Road to Heaven presented a mostly factual account of a Newell-like Colorado boy named Kit West in a Kerouacian style. Like Newell, West falls in love with a girl, joins her church, and spends two years in Colombia as a missionary. Newell wrote the story as fiction because "A nonfiction story might come across like the daily news—arm's-length facts, figures, and dates. Readers might be less likely to relate to a nonfiction account and characters in a personal way. Novelizing my story freed my creative psyche in key ways, and I believe this novelization allows readers to better insert themselves into the story as well, wherever they want to fit. They can own the story for themselves, and it becomes more useful, available." The complaint Publishers Weekly had about miraculous episodes is "the only possible drawback" to novelization; according to Newell, "Every one of those 'miraculous episodes' is true."

The novel was a critical success in Mormon circles and garnered Newell nominations for several awards, including wins for best novel of the year for 2007 from both the Association for Mormon Letters and the Whitney Awards.

A former adjunct professor of communication at Salt Lake Community College and assistant professor of communication and co-director of the concentration in public relations at the University of St. Francis (Franciscan) in Ft. Wayne, Indiana, Newell is now executive director of Project Amigo, a non-profit organization in Colima, Mexico.

== Books ==
- Dying Words: Colombian Journalists and the Cocaine Warlords (1990) ISBN 978-0-963-01490-0
- Cow Chips Aren't For Dippin': A Guide to Life in the New Wild West (1996) ISBN 978-0-879-05736-7
- Latter Days : A Guided Tour Through Six Billion Years of Mormonism (2001) ISBN 978-0-312-24108-7
- Journey to Edaphica (2006) ISBN 978-1-419-63336-2
- On the Road to Heaven (2007) ISBN 978-0-978-79713-3

== Albums ==
- Bard of Broken Dreams (2002)
- Box of Rocks (2003)
