= Susan Evans McCloud =

American poet

Susan Evans McCloud (born July 28, 1945) is an American novelist, author, poet and hymn-writer. She is a member of the Church of Jesus Christ of Latter-day Saints (LDS Church) and her work often reflects her religious beliefs.

== Biography ==
McCloud lived much of her adult life in Provo, Utah. She is the mother of six children. She is an active member of the Daughters of Utah Pioneers, has written several programs for ldsradio.org, and other materials for the LDS Church. She and her family are involved in their Scottish heritage. Her only son plays the bagpipes, and was featured in "A Celebration of Family History" held in the LDS Church's Conference Center in April 2010. She was a docent at Brigham Young's Beehive House in Salt Lake City for over 20 years, and docent for the Etruscan Exhibit at the Brigham Young University (BYU) Museum of Art.

McCloud was a member of Joseph A. Cannon's 1992 Utah County Steering Committee when he was seeking the Republican Nomination for Senate.

In 2004, McCloud was given the Reed Smoot Citizenship Awards business women of the year award.

== Publications ==
=== Music ===
Two of McCloud's hymns appear in the LDS Church's 1985 hymnbook. One of these, "Lord I Would Follow Thee," has also been recorded by the Tabernacle Choir at Temple Square. Lines from this hymn have been quoted in essays by church leaders, and it has even been called "one of the best-loved songs in the LDS Church" McCloud wrote her other hymn, "As Zion's Youth in Latter Days," with the goal of giving strength to a "vacillating youth."

McCloud has also contributed to film music used by the LDS Church's seminaries.

=== Writing ===
McCloud has published more than 45 books, both fiction and non-fiction. Since the late 1970s she has published nearly one novel annually, many through the publishers Bookcraft or Scribe Publishing. Her novel Black Stars Over Mexico was a best seller in January 1985. Her non-fiction Brigham Young: An Inspiring Personal Biography was partly developed as a result of her 30 years as a docent at the Beehive House in Salt Lake City, a former home of LDS Church leader Brigham Young.

Many of her novels are historical fiction of 19th-century Latter-day Saints in far-flung places, such as England or India, and feature elements of chaste romance and mild suspense. Some reviewers have criticized her novels as being heavy-handed with their pro-Latter-day Saint messages, and of being repetitious of previous themes, but reviews have also noted McCloud's strong characters and the power of her descriptions. Her work has been reviewed by Dialogue: A Journal of Mormon Thought Although rejected by some critics, her work is praised by others, such as Deseret News columnist Jerry Johnston.

McCloud's poetry first appeared in the Ensign magazine in 1972.

McCloud has also written scripts for film and television productions, including the script for making one of her books into a made-for-TV movie. In the late 1960s, she wrote by-line feature articles for the Dixon Evening Telegraph in Dixon, Illinois, the hometown of Ronald Reagan.
