= Rachel Ann Nunes =

American novelist (born 1966)

- Born: May 7, 1966 (age 60); Provo, Utah, U.S.
- Occupation: Author
- Website: rachelannnunes.com

Rachel Ann Nunes (born May 7, 1966) is an American bestselling and award-winning author born in Provo, Utah.

== Career ==
She has authored dozens of novels, including the Autumn Rain series, the Ariana series, and the Huntington Family series. Nunes also published two picture books, Daughter of a King and The Secret of the King.

Nunes writes mainstream women's fiction, family drama, romance, paranormal romantic suspense, Christian fiction, and LDS fiction. Though she has focused primarily on clean romances and stories revolving around families, she has also published two picture books and a middle-grade chapter book, The Problem With Spaceships: Zero G, the first of an intended series.

She has currently published over three dozen books.

== Plagiarism suit ==
In August 2014, Nunes filed a suit in a federal Utah court against schoolteacher Tiffanie Rushton for "plagiariz[ing]" her book. Nunes' book, Love to the Highest Bidder, was registered with the U.S. Copyright Office in 1998. Rushton's book is titled A Bid for Love and copies had been sold after it was published online in early 2014. The suit stated, "In converting Ms. Nunes's work into The Auction Deal, [Rushton] added several graphic sex scenes and other adult content to what was originally a Christian novel." Nunes contacted Rushton about the story. Rushton offered multiple conflicting explanations to Nunes and others, including one claim that the book "was developed in a writing group and that she wouldn't pursue publication". Nunes is suing Rushton for plagiarism, defamation, and harassment; and seeking at least $150,000 in damages.

== Publications ==
- Ariana: The Making of a Queen (Covenant Communications, Sept 1996, reprinted by Deseret Book, May 2008)
- Ariana: A Gift Most Precious, Covenant Communications,(Covenant Communications, Sept 1997, reprinted by Deseret Book, May 2008)
- Ariana: A New Beginning (Covenant Communications, Jan 1998, reprinted by Deseret Book, May 2008)
- A Bid for Love (Covenant Communications, Aug 1998, reprinted by Spring Creek, ebook by Nunes Entertainment LLC, 2010)
- Ariana: A Glimpse of Eternity (Covenant Communications, Feb 1999, reprinted by Cedar Fort)
- Framed for Love (Covenant Communications, May 1999, reprinted by Spring Creek, ebook by Nunes Entertainment LLC, 2010)
- To Love and to Promise (Covenant Communications, September 1999, reprinted by Spring Creek, ebook by Nunes Entertainment LLC, 2010)
- Love on the Run (Covenant Communications, Sept 2000, reprinted by Spring Creek, ebook by Nunes Entertainment LLC, 2010)
- A Greater Love (Truebeckon Books, March 2000, ebook by Nunes Entertainment LLC, 2010)
- Tomorrow and Always (Covenant Communications, September 2000, ebook by Nunes Entertainment LLC, Feb 2011)
- This Time Forever (Covenant Communications, Jan 2001, ebook by Nunes Entertainment LLC, 2010)
- This Very Moment (Covenant Communications, Sept 2001, ebook by Nunes Entertainment LLC, 2010)
- Bridge to Forever (Covenant Communications, June 2001, ebook by Nunes Entertainment LLC, 2010)
- Daughter of a King (Covenant Communications, August 2001)
- Ties That Binds (Covenant Communications, March 2002, reprinted by Cedar Fort, ebook by Nunes Entertainment LLC, 2011)
- Twice in a Lifetime (Cedar Fort, Sept 2002, reprinted by Cedar Fort, ebook by Nunes Entertainment LLC, Feb 2012)
- A Heartbeat Away (Cedar Fort, April 2003, ebook by Nunes Entertainment LLC, Feb 2012)
- Where I Belong (Cedar Fort, August 2003, ebook by Nunes Entertainment LLC, Feb 2012)
- In Your Place (Cedar Fort, August 2004, ebook by Nunes Entertainment LLC, 2011)
- Winter Fire (Deseret Book, January 2005,)
- Secret of the King (Deseret Book, April 2005)
- No Longer Strangers (Deseret Book, Jan 2005)
- Chasing Yesterday (Deseret Book, Jan 2006
- By Morning Light (Deseret Book, Aug 2006
- The Independence Club (Deseret Book, Dec 2006)
- Flying Home (Shadow Mountain, Aug 2007)
- Fields of Home (Shadow Mountain, Feb 2008
- Eyes of a Stranger (Shadow Mountain, Sept 2008)
- Saving Madeline (Shadow Mountain, Sept 2009)
- Imprints, An Autumn Rain Novel (Shadow Mountain, April 2010)
- The Problem with Spaceships, Zero G (ebook Nunes Entertainment, March 2011)
- Shades of Gray, An Autumn Rain Novel (Shadow Mountain, May 2011)
- The Gift of Angels (ebook by Nunes Entertainment LLC, July 2011, print book by Cedar Fort August 2012)
- Before I Say Goodbye (Deseret Book, September 2011)
- Tell Me No Lies (ebook, January 2012 Nunes Entertainment LLC)
- Final Call, An Autumn Rain Novel (Shadow Mountain, February 2012)
- Line of Fire, An Autumn Rain Novel (Shadow Mountain, September 2012)
