= Jason F. Wright =

American author

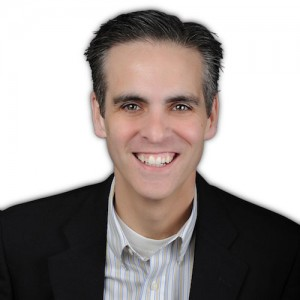
- Occupation: Author
- Website: jasonfwright.com

Jason F. Wright is an American author.

== Biography ==
Jason F. Wright was born near St. Louis, Missouri to Willard Samuel Wright and Sandra Fletcher Wright. His family lived and traveled throughout Europe until 1975. He later lived in Chicago, Illinois and Charlottesville, Virginia, attending Albemarle High School. He began writing in elementary school and published this first book, Sitting on the Dock, as a junior in high school in 1988.

His 2007 novel, The Wednesday Letters, reached #6 on The New York Times bestseller list. It also appeared on the bestseller lists of The Wall Street Journal and USA Today. The paperback edition, published by Penguin, was on The New York Times trade paperback bestseller and extended lists for 36 weeks in 2008–2009.

His debut novel, The James Miracle, was released in 2004. His 2005 novel, Christmas Jars, was also a New York Times bestseller, appearing on the paperback list in 2007. The film was produced by Muse and BYUtv and was released in theaters in November 2019. It was later released on DVD and on streaming platforms.

In addition to his novels, Wright writes occasionally for the Deseret News and his hometown paper, the Northern Virginia Daily.

He has also appeared on national and local shows including The Kelly Clarkson Show, CNN, FoxNews, GMA3.

== Works ==
- The Final 4th of Sergeant Drummond (2026)
- Scar Dakota (2024)
- Rise Today: Trusting God and His Promise (2023)
- Until You Find Strength: A Message of Comfort for When Your Grief Feels Too Heavy (2022)
- Even the Dog Knows (2022)
- See Love Lift: How Seeing, Loving, and Lifting Others Will Change Your Life (2020)
- The Christmas Doll (2019)
- Courage to Be You, with Gail Miller (2018)
- Christmas Jars: Collector's Edition (2017)
- Picturing Christmas (2017)
- A Letter to Mary (2016)
- Christmas Jars Journey (2015)
- The James Miracle: 10th Anniversary Edition (2014)
- The 13th Day of Christmas (2012)
- The Wedding Letters (2011)
- Seventeen Second Miracle (2010)
- The Cross Gardener (2010)
- Christmas Jars Reunion (2009)
- Penny's Christmas Jar Miracle (2009)
- Recovering Charles (2008)
- The Wednesday Letters (2007)
- Christmas Jars (2005)
- The James Miracle (2004)
