= Marilyn Brown (author) =

American novelist

- Born: 1938 (age 87–88); Denver, Colorado, U.S.
- Education: Brigham Young University; University of Utah
- Occupation: Novelist
- Spouse(s): Lloyd Miller Bill Brown (m. 1975)
- Children: 6
- Writing career
- Pen name: Marilyn Miller; Marilyn McMeen Miller; Marilyn R. Brown

Marilyn McMeen Miller Brown (born 1938) is an American novelist best known for her work within her native Mormon culture. She is the creator and namesake of the Marilyn Brown Novel Award.

Brown has written 14 novels. In 2000, she served as president of the Association for Mormon Letters. Brown has also had works attributed to her not only as Marilyn Brown, but as Marilyn Miller, Marilyn McMeen Miller, Marilyn R. Brown and several other related variants.

== Biography ==
Marilyn was born in Denver, Colorado. She holds two degrees from Brigham Young University and another from the University of Utah. Her first marriage was with the jazz musician Lloyd Miller. In 1975 she married Bill Brown and they are the parents of six children.

Brown has taught English at Brigham Young University and served as an editor for the Brigham Young University Press.

Brown is also a Latter-day Saint hymnwriter. She wrote the words to the hymn "Thy Servants Are Prepared" which is included in the 1985 LDS Church English-language hymnal.

Brown has also written a large amount of poetry. She has been included in a listing of 75 significant Mormon poets.

Brown's first novel Earth Keepers was published in 1979. Her novel Serpent in Paradise, based on Richard Dutcher's 2001 film "Brigham City" was published in 2006. Her novel The Wine Dark Sea of Grass is her fictional take on the Mountain Meadows massacre.
