= Levi S. Peterson =

American writer (born 1933)

Levi Savage Peterson (born 1933) is a Mormon biographer, essayist and fictionist whose best-known works include a seminal biography of Juanita Brooks, his own autobiography, and his novel The Backslider, a "standard for the contemporary Mormon novel." He was born and reared in the Mormon community of Snowflake, Arizona and is an emeritus professor of English at Weber State University in Ogden, Utah. He served a mission for the Church of Jesus Christ of Latter-day Saints in French-speaking Switzerland and Belgium from 1954 to 1957. He edited Dialogue: A Journal of Mormon Thought from 2004 to 2008.

Peterson's work as a writer centers in "the possibility of wrong behavior"; his works "variously examine the tension between Sainthood as fact and Sainthood as aspiration, between belief and doubt, and between expected blessings and the traumas of reality." Similarly, he taught his writing students to "write from the other side of your inhibitions." In an essay entitled "In Defense of a Mormon Erotica," Peterson stated that "prudery reinforces pornography" by hiding sexual feelings. He encouraged Mormon authors to include sexual content and obscenities (in an appropriate amounts) in their work, writing that "there is a vitality in sexual imagery and obscenities."

Peterson has been the recipient of several AML Awards: Short Fiction (1978) for "The Confessions of Augustine", Short Fiction (1982–1983) for "The Canyons of Grace", Special Award for Short Story Anthology (1982–1983) for Greening Wheat: Fifteen Mormon Short Stories, Novel (1986) for The Backslider, Special Recognition in Biography (1988) for Juanita Brooks: Mormon Woman Historian, Honorary Lifetime Membership (1988), Smith-Pettit Foundation Award for Outstanding Contribution to Mormon Letters (2009), and Short Fiction (2016) for "Kid Kirby". Additionally, his work has been a finalist in the short fiction category twice: 2014 ("Jesus Enough") and 2019 ("Bode and Iris").

== Partial bibliography ==
- Peterson, Levi S. (1982), The Canyons of Grace, University of Illinois Press (Later republished by Signature Books), ISBN 0-941214-26-5, OCLC 8306271
- Peterson, Levi S., ed. (1983), Greening Wheat: Fifteen Mormon Short Stories, Orion Books/Signature Books, ISBN 0941214125, OCLC 10118168
- —— (1986), The Backslider, Signature Books, ISBN 0941214451, OCLC 14378627
- —— (1988), Juanita Brooks: Mormon Woman Historian, Utah Centennial Series, University of Utah Press, ISBN 978-1-60781-151-0, OCLC 18106573
- —— (1990), Night Soil: New Stories, Signature Books, ISBN 1560850035, OCLC 21873653
- —— (1995), Aspen Marooney, Signature Books, ISBN 1560850787, OCLC 33166649
- —— (2006), A Rascal by Nature, A Christian by Yearning: A Mormon Autobiography, University of Utah Press, ISBN 978-0-87480-851-3, OCLC 62766043
- —— (2021), Losing a Bit of Eden, Signature Books, ISBN 9781560852926
