= Jennie Hansen =

American novelist

Jennie Hansen is a Latter Day Saint (LDS) fiction author whose publications include newspaper and magazines articles, news stories, editorials, short stories, reviews of other LDS author's work, and twelve novels. She also is a frequent speaker at firesides, conferences, and literary groups.

Hansen was born in Idaho Falls, Idaho, and was first published at the age of seven. She received an associate degree from Ricks College (now BYU-Idaho). She is also a graduate with a BA from the Westminster College in Salt Lake City, Utah. Her past occupations have been an editor and newspaper reporter for a weekly newspaper and occasionally wrote articles for a daily newspaper. She worked for the Utah State Legislature before being currently employed as the circulation specialist for the Salt Lake City Public Library system.

Some of the awards that she has received include many journalism rewards. The National Federation of Press Women's second place was awarded to her for editing the Valley View News (1978). She also was awarded third place for the Contemporary for Some Sweet Day, Heart of the West 1997 Writers Contest.

== Bibliography ==
- Abandoned
- All I Hold Dear
- Beyond Summer Dreams
- Breaking Point
- Chance Encounter
- Code Red
- Coming Home
- Emerald
- High Stakes
- Macady
- Some Sweet Day
- The Bracelet
- Wild Card
