= AML Awards =

Annual literary award

The AML Awards are given annually by the Association for Mormon Letters (AML) to the best work "by, for, and about Mormons." They are juried awards, chosen by a panel of judges. Citations for many of the awards can be found on the AML website.

The award categories vary from year to year depending on the shape of the market and what the AML decides is worthy of honor. Beginning with the 2014 awards, the AML began creating a shortlist of finalists for most categories, which preceded the final awards.

== 1970s ==
AML Award winners, 1975-1979
Year	Category	Author	Title	Ref.
1975-1977	Critical Writing	Clifton Holt Jolley	The Martyrdom of Joseph Smith: An Archetypal Study, Utah Historical Quarterly, 44:4, Fall 1976.	
1975-1977	Poetry	Arthur Henry King	"The Field Behind Holly House," BYU Studies 16, 1976	
1975-1977	Poetry	Linda Sillitoe	"The Old Philosopher" and "Letter to a Four-Year-Old Daughter"	
1975-1977	Short Fiction	Donald Marshall	"The Wheelbarrow" and "The Reunion," both from the collection Frost in the Orchard	
1975-1977	Short Fiction	Douglas H. Thayer	"Indian Hills" and "Zarahemla," both from the collection Under Cottonwoods and Other Stories	
1978	Criticism	Steven P. Sondrup	"Literary Dimensions of Mormon Autobiography," Dialogue 11, Summer 1978	
1978	Poetry (Note: In 1978, Clark and Brown were honorable mentions in the poetry category.)	Clinton F. Larson	The Western World (Brigham Young University)	
1978	Poetry	Marden J. Clark	"God's Plenty"	
1978	Poetry	Marilyn McMeen Miller Brown	"Grandmother"	
1978	Short Fiction (Note: In 1978, Rosenbaum was an honorable mention in the short story category.)	Levi S. Peterson	"The Confessions of Augustine" and "Road to Damascus"	
1978	Short Fiction	Karen Rosenbaum	"Hit the Frolicking, Rippling Brooks"	
1978	Criticism	Cindy Lesser Larsen	"Whoever Heard of a Utah Poet?: An Overview of Poetry in the Early Church." Century II, 4 (Fall 1979)	
1979	Poetry	Marden J. Clark	Moods: Of Late	
1979	Poetry	Edward L. Hart	To Utah	
1979	Short Fiction	Béla Petsco	Nothing Very Important and Other Stories	

== 1980s ==
AML Award winners, 1980-1989
Year	Category	Author	Title	Ref.
1980	Biography	Frank W. Fox	J. Reuben Clark: The Public Years	
1980	Criticism	Linda Sillitoe	"New Voices, New Songs: Contemporary Poems by Mormon Women" (Dialogue, Winter 1980)	
1980	Novel	Marilyn McMeen Miller Brown	The Earthkeepers	
1980	Poetry	Emma Lou Thayne	Once in Israel	
1981	Criticism	George S. Tate	The Typology of the Exodus Pattern in the Book of Mormon (in Literature and Belief)	
1981	Poetry	Robert A. Rees	"Gilead"	
1981	Poetry	Linda Sillitoe	"Lullaby in the New Year" and "Demons"	
1981	Short Fiction	Linda Sillitoe	"Lullaby in the New Year" and "Demons"	
1981	Short Fiction	Robert A. Christmas	"Another Angel"	
1982-1983	Criticism	Eugene England	"The Dawning of a Brighter Day: Mormon Literature after 150 Years"	
1982-1983	Drama	Thomas F. Rogers	God's Fools: Plays of the Mitigated Conscience	
1982-1983	Editorial Award	Editors of the Exponent II		
1982-1983	Mormon Humor, First Prize	Calvin Grondahl	Freeway to Perfection, Faith Promoting Rumors, and Sunday's Foyer	
1982-1983	Mormon Humor, Second Prize	Clifton Holt Jolley	Selling the Chevrolet: A Moral Exercise	
1982-1983	Novel	Douglas H. Thayer	Summer Fire	
1982-1983	Poetry	Clinton F. Larson	"Romaunt of the Rose: A Tapestry of Poems," BYU Studies, 23:1, 1983	
1982-1983	Poetry, Young Poet's Prize	Holly Ann Welker	"Feet," "Patience," "On My Father's 50th Birthday," and "The Birthday Present"	
1982-1983	Sermon	Neal A. Maxwell		
1982-1983	Short Fiction	Levi S. Peterson	The Canyons of Grace	
1982-1983	Special Award for Popular Mormon Fiction	Jack Weyland		
1982-1983	Special Award for Short Story Anthology	Levi S. Peterson	Greening Wheat: Fifteen Mormon Short Stories	
1984	Editing & Publishing	Scott Kenney		
1984	Novel	Orson Scott Card	A Woman of Destiny (Later republished as Saints)	
1984	Personal Essay	Eugene England	"A Dialogue with Myself: Personal Essays on Mormon Experience"	
1984	Special Award	Carol Lynn Pearson		
1985	Criticism	Steven Walker	"Seven Ways of Looking at Susanna"	
1985	Novel	Herbert Harker	Circle of Fire	
1985	Personal Essay	Edward Geary	Goodbye to Poplarhaven	
1985	Poetry	Emma Lou Thayne		
1985	Short Fiction	Neal C. Chandler	"Benediction"	
1986	Children's literature	Steve Wunderlie and Brent Watts (illus.)	Marty's World	
1986	Novel	Levi Peterson	The Backslider	
1986	Personal and family history book	Myrtle McDonald	No Regrets: The Life of Carl A. Carlquist	
1986	Personal and family history essay	Paul M. Edwards	"When Will the Little Woman Come Out of the House?"	
1986	Personal Essay	Susan Taber	"In Jeopardy Every Hour"	
1986	Poetry	Dennis Marden Clark	"Sunwatch"	
1986	Religious Literature	Dennis Rasmussen	The Lord’s Question	
1986	Short Fiction	Michael Fillerup	"Hozhoogoo Nanina Doo"	
1987	Criticism	Bruce W. Jorgensen	No Regrets: The Life of Carl A. Carlquist	
1987	Novel	Linda Sillitoe	Sideways to the Sun	
1987	Personal Essay	Mary Lythgoe Bradford	Leaving Home	
1987	Poetry	Robert A. Christmas	"Self-Portrait as Brigham Young"	
1987	Short Fiction	Darrell Spencer	Woman Packing a Pistol	
1988	Honorary Lifetime Membership	Elouise Bell		
1988	Honorary Lifetime Membership	Mary L. Bradford		
1988	Honorary Lifetime Membership	John S. Harris		
1988	Honorary Lifetime Membership	Gerald N. Lund		
1988	Honorary Lifetime Membership	Hugh Nibley		
1988	Honorary Lifetime Membership	Levi S. Peterson		
1988	Honorary Lifetime Membership	Douglas Thayer		
1988	Honorary Lifetime Membership	Emma Lou Thayne		
1988	Honorary Lifetime Membership	Laurel T. Ulrich		
1988	Honorary Lifetime Membership	Terry Tempest Williams		
1988	Honorary Lifetime Membership	William A. Wilson		
1988	Novel	Ann Edwards Cannon	Cal Cameron by Day, Spider-Man by Night (Delacorte)	
1988	Personal Essay	Karin Anderson England	"The Man at the Chapel" Dialogue 21.4 (Winter 1988): 133-41	
1988	Poetry	Dennis Marden Clark	Tinder: answer might be. With an almost Augustinian Dry Poems (Orem, Utah: United Order Books, 1988)	
1988	Short Story	John Bennion	"A Court of Love," Sunstone 12.2 (March 1988): 30-38 "A House of Order," Dialogue 21.3 (Autumn 1988): 129–48 "Dust," Ascent 14.1 (1988): 1-10.	
1988	Special Recognition in Biography	Levi S. Peterson	Juanita Brooks: Mormon Woman Historian (Salt Lake City: University of Utah Press, 1988)	
1988	Special Recognition in Criticism	Wayne C. Booth	The Company We Keep: An Ethics of Fiction (Berkeley: University of California Press, 1988)	
1988	Special Recognition in Poetry	Clinton F. Larson	Selected Poems of Clinton F. Larson (Provo: Brigham Young University, 1988)	
1989	Criticism	Dennis Clark	"Mormon Poetry Now!: The State of the Art" (a series of four essays published in Sunstone, 1985–1989)	
1989	Criticism	Michael Hicks	Mormonism and Music: A History (University of Illinois Press)	
1989	Editing & Publishing	Sunstone Magazine (Editors Scott Kenney, Allen Roberts, Peggy Fletcher, and Elbert Peck)		
1989	Editing & Publishing	Signature Books		
1989	Novel	Judith Freeman	The Chinchilla Farm (Norton)	
1989	Personal Essay	Emma Lou Thayne	As for Me and My House (Bookcraft)	
1989	Poetry	Susan Elizabeth Howe	"Things in the Night Sky" in Harvest: Contemporary Mormon Poems	
1989	Short Fiction	Pauline Mortensen	Back Before the World Turned Nasty (University of Arkansas Press)	

== 1990s ==
AML Award winners, 1990-1999
Year	Category	Author	Title	Ref.
1990	Criticism	William A. Wilson	"In Praise of Ourselves: Stories to Tell"	
1990	Novel	Franklin Fisher	Bones	
1990	Personal Essay	Elouise Bell	Only When I Laugh	
1990	Poetry	Loretta Randall Sharp	"Doing It"	
1990	Short Fiction	Walter Kirn	My Hard Bargain	
1991	Biography	Laurel Thatcher Ulrich	A Midwife's Tale	
1991	Editing & Publishing	Signature Books and Ron Schow, Wayne Schow, Marybeth Raynes (ed.)	Peculiar People: Mormons and Same-Sex Orientation	
1991	Honorary Lifetime Membership	Marden J. Clark		
1991	Honorary Lifetime Membership	Edward L. Hart		
1991	Honorary Lifetime Membership	Clinton F. Larson		
1991	Honorary Lifetime Membership	William Mulder		
1991	Honorary Lifetime Membership	Helen Candland Stark		
1991	Honorary Lifetime Membership	Virginia Eggertsen Sorensen Waugh		
1991	Honorary Lifetime Membership	Maurine Whipple		
1991	Novel	Orson Scott Card	Xenocide	
1991	Novel	Gerald N. Lund	Like a Fire is Burning	
1991	Personal Essay	Terry Tempest Williams	Refuge: An Unnatural History of Family and Place	
1991	Poetry	Philip White	"Island Spring and the Perseids", in Dialogue, Spring & Winter 1991	
1991	Short Fiction	Michael Fillerup	"Lost and Found" from Christmas for the World	
1991	Young Adult Literature	Louise Plummer	My Name is Sus5an Smith. The 5 is Silent	
1992	Biography	Rudi Wobbe and Jerry Borrowman	Before the Blood Tribunal	
1992	Children's Literature	Barbara J. Porter and Dileen Marsh	All Kinds of Answers	
1992	Honorary Lifetime Membership	Richard Scowcroft		
1992	Honorary Lifetime Membership	Emma Lou Thayne		
1992	Novel	Orson Scott Card	Lost Boys	
1992	Personal Essay	Marden J. Clark	Liberating Form: Mormon Essays on Religion and Literature	
1992	Poetry	Kathy Evans	"Imagination Comes to Breakfast"	
1992	Short Fiction	Margaret Blair Young	Elegies and Love Songs	
1993	Autobiography	Phyllis Barber	How I Got Cultured: A Nevada Memoir	
1993	Award for Editorial Excellence	M. Shayne Bell	Washed by a Wave of Wind: Science Fiction from the Corridor	
1993	Children's Literature	Michael O. Tunnell	Chinook! The Joke's on George and Beauty and the Beastly Children	
1993	Drama	Neil LaBute	In the Company of Men	
1993	Honorary Lifetime Membership	Wayne C. Booth		
1993	Honorary Lifetime Membership	Steven P. Sondrup		
1993	Novel	Leslie Beaton Hedley	Twelve Sisters	
1993	Novel	Gerald N. Lund	Thy Gold to Refine: The Work and the Glory, Vol. 4	
1993	Personal Essay	Eugene England	"Monte Cristo" in Wasatch Review International, 2:1, June 1993.	
1993	Poetry	Linda Sillitoe	Crazy for Living	
1993	Sermon	Chieko N. Okazaki	Lighten Up! and Cat's Cradle	
1993	Service to Mormon Letters	Neila Seshachari and Weber State University	Weber Studies, Vol. 10.3, Tenth Anniversary Issue	
1993	Short Story	Darrell Spencer	Our Secret's Out	
1993	Young Adult Literature	Martine Bates	The Dragon's Tapestry and The Prism Moon	
1994	Biography	William G. Hartley	My Best for the Kingdom: John Lowe Butler, A Mormon Frontiersman	
1994	Criticism	Gideon O. Burton	"Towards a Mormon Criticism: Should We Ask 'Is This Mormon Literature?'"	
1994	Drama	Eric Samuelsen	Accommodations: a Play in Three Acts	
1994	Honorary Lifetime Membership	Samuel W. Taylor		
1994	Novel	Anne Perry	The Sins of the Wolf	
1994	Personal Essay	Richard D. Poll	"A Liahona Latter-day Saint"	
1994	Poetry	Pamela Porter Hamblin	"Magi"	
1994	Short Fiction	Wayne Jorgensen	"Who Tarzan, Who Jane"	
1994	Young Adult Literature	Dean Hughes	The Trophy	
1995	Biography	Maureen Ursenbach Beecher	The Personal Writings of Eliza Roxcy Snow	
1995	Criticism	Michael Austin	How to Be a Mormo-American; Or, The Function of Mormon Criticism at the Present Time	
1995	Drama	Tim Slover	March Tale	
1995	Essay	Terry Tempest Williams	Desert Quartet: An Erotic Landscape	
1995	Novel	Mack Hedges	Last Buckaroo	
1995	Poetry	Marden J. Clark	"Snows"	
1995	Short Fiction	Tory C. Anderson	"Epiphany"	
1995	Young Adult Literature	Louise Plummer	The Unlikely Romance of Kate Bjorkman	
1996	Biography	Marian Robertson Wilson	Leroy Robertson: Music Giant from the Rockies	
1996	Children's Literature	Rick Walton	You Don't Always Get What You Hope For	
1996	Criticism	Bruce W. Jorgensen	"Heritage of Hostility: The Mormon Attack on Fiction in the 19th Century; Roughly One of the R's: Some Notes of a BYU Fiction Teacher (with a Pedantry of Endnotes)"	
1996	Drama	Tim Slover	Joyful Noise	
1996	Novel	Judith Freeman	A Desert of Pure Feeling	
1996	Personal Essay	Kenneth O. Kemp	"3/4-inch Marine Ply"	
1996	Poetry	Leslie Norris	Collected Poems	
1996	Short Fiction	Paul Rawlins	No Lie Like Love: Stories	
1996	Young Adult Literature	Pat Bezzant	Angie	
1997	Criticism	Richard Dilworth Rust	Feasting on the Word: The Literary Testimony of the Book of Mormon	
1997	Devotional Literature	Chieko N. Okazaki	Sanctuary	
1997	Drama	Eric Samuelsen	Gadianton	
1997	Personal Essay	Holly Welker	"What You Walk Away From"	
1997	Poetry	Susan Elizabeth Howe	Stone Spirits	
1997	Short Fiction	Brady Udall	Beautiful Places	
1998	Devotional Literature	Clark L. Kidd and Kathryn H. Kidd	A Convert's Guide to Mormon Life	
1998	Novel	Dean Hughes	Far from Home	
1998	Personal Essay	Tom Plummer	Eating Chocolates and Dancing in the Kitchen: Sketches of Marriage and Family	
1998	Poetry	Alex Caldiero	Various Atmospheres: Poems and Drawings	
1998	Short Fiction	Helen Walker Jones	The Six-Buck Fortune	
1998	Young Adult Literature	Martine Bates	The Taker's Key	
1999	Devotional Literature	Neal A. Maxwell	One More Strain of Praise	
1999	Drama	Eric Samuelsen	The Way We're Wired	
1999	Marilyn Brown Novel Award	Jack Harrell	Every Knee Shall Bow (published in 2003 as Vernal Promises)	
1999	Marilyn Brown Novel Award Honorable Mention	Laura Dene Card	The Wildest Waste	
1999	Marilyn Brown Novel Award Honorable Mention	Alan Rex Mitchell	Barry Monroe’s Missionary Journal	
1999	Marilyn Brown Novel Award Honorable Mention	Dorothy W. Peterson	Windows	
1999	Novel	Anne Perry	Tathea	
1999	Personal Essay	Martha Beck	Expecting Adam: A True Story of Birth, Rebirth, and Everyday Magic	
1999	Short Fiction	Mary Clyde	Survival Rates	

== 2000s ==
AML Award winners, 2000-2009
Year	Category	Author	Title
2000	Criticism	Benson Parkinson	AML-List
2000	Devotional Literature	Patricia Terry Holland	A Quiet Heart
2000	Drama	Margaret Blair Young	I Am Jane
2000	Film	Richard Dutcher	God's Army
2000	Honorary Lifetime Membership	Richard Cracroft	
2000	Novel	Margaret Blair Young and Darius Gray	One More River to Cross
2000	Personal Essay	Gordon B. Hinckley	Standing for Something: 10 Neglected Virtues That Will Heal Our Hearts and Homes
2000	Short Fiction	Darrell Spencer	Caution: Men in Trees
2001	Children's Literature	Don Staheli	The Story of the Walnut Tree
2001	Criticism	Dian Monson	Believing in the Word
2001	Drama	J. Scott Bronson	Stones
2001	Honorary Lifetime Membership	Thomas F. Rogers	
2001	Marilyn Brown Novel Award	A. Jeff Call	Mormonville
2001	Middle Grade Literature	Carol Lynch Williams	My Angelica
2001	Novel	Brady Udall	The Miracle Life of Edgar Mint
2001	Review	Jeffrey Needle	
2001	Young Adult Literature	Louise Plummer	A Dance for Three
2002	Drama	Reed McColm	Hole in the Sky
2002	Drama Honorable Mention	Melissa Leilani Larson	Wake Me When It's Over
2002	Drama Honorable Mention	Tim Slover	Hancock County
2002	Film	Christian Vuissa	Roots and Wings
2002	Film Adaptation	Janine Whetton Gilbert	Charly
2002	Film Honorable Mention	Andrew Black	The Snell Show
2002	Film Honorable Mention	Ryan Little	Out of Step
2002	Honorary Lifetime Membership	Lavina Fielding Anderson	
2002	Honorary Lifetime Membership	Bruce Wayne Jorgensen	
2002	In Memoriam	Neila Seshachari	
2002	Novel	Chris Crowe	Mississippi Trial, 1955
2002	Picture Book	Rick Walton	Bertie Was a Watchdog
2002	Poetry	Kimberly Johnson	Leviathan with a Hook
2002	Short Fiction	Susan Palmer	"Breakthrough" in Sunstone, issue 122, pages 42-45, April 2002.
2002	Short Fiction Honorable Mention	Linda Paulson Adams	"First"
2002	Short Fiction Honorable Mention	Karen Rosenbaum	"Out of the Woods"
2002	Young Adult Literature	Ann Edwards Cannon	Charlotte's Rose
2002	Young Adult Literature Honorable Mention	Kimberley Heuston	The Shakeress
2002	Young Adult Literature Honorable Mention	Martine Leavitt	The Dollmage
2003	Drama	LeeAnne Hill Adams	Archipelago
2003	Editing	Chris Bigelow	Irreantum
2003	Film Adaptation	Anne K. Black, Jason Faller, and Katherine Swigert	Pride and Prejudice: A Latter-Day Comedy
2003	Historical Fiction	Margaret Blair Young and Darius Gray	Standing on the Promises
2003	Marilyn Brown Novel Award	Janean Justham	House Dreams
2003	Novel	Douglas Thayer	The Conversion of Jeff Williams
2003	Publishing	BYU Studies Quarterly	
2003	Short Fiction	Coke Newell	"Toaster Road"
2003	Short Fiction Honorable Mention	William Shunn	"The Day Pietro Coppino Spoke to the Mountain"
2003	Short Fiction Honorable Mention	Robert Wagoner	"A Good Sign"
2003	Young Adult Literature	Kimberley Heuston	Dante's Daughter
2003	Young Adult Literature Honorable Mention	Shannon Hale	The Goose Girl
2003	Young Adult Literature Honorable Mention	Kristen Randle	Slumming
2004	Criticism	Meridian Magazine	
2004	Film	Adam Abel	Saints and Soldiers
2004	Middle Grade Literature	Patricia Wiles	My Mom's a Mortician
2004	Middle Grade Literature Honorable Mention	Randall Wright	Hunchback
2004	Novel	P. G. Karamesines	The Pictograph Murders
2004	Novel Honorable Mention	Amber Esplin	Leaving Eden
2004	Poetry	John Talbot	The Well-Tempered Tantrum
2004	Special Award Honorable Mention	The J. Willard Marriott Library of the University of Utah	
2004	Young Adult Literature	Shannon Hale	Enna Burning
2004	Young Adult Literature Honorable Mention	Mette Ivie Harrison	Mira, Mirror
2004	Young Adult Literature Honorable Mention	Janette Rallison	Life, Love, and the Pursuit of Free Throws
2005	Biography	Richard Lyman Bushman	Joseph Smith: Rough Stone Rolling
2005	Criticism	William Morris, P. G. Karamesines, Kent Larsen, and Eric Russell	A Motley Vision
2005	Film	Greg Whiteley	New York Doll
2005	Marilyn Brown Novel Award	Arianne B. Cope	The Coming of Elijah
2005	Marilyn Brown Novel Award Honorable Mention	Donald Marshall	Seeker
2005	Novel	Brandon Sanderson	Elantris
2005	Novel Honorable Mention	Orson Scott Card	Magic Street
2005	Novel Honorable Mention	Roger Terry	God's Executioner
2005	Poetry	Lance Larsen	In All Their Animal Brilliance
2005	Smith-Pettit Foundation Award for Outstanding Contribution to Mormon Letters	Dean Hughes	Children of the Promise
2005	Special Award	Allred Laura	The Golden Plates
2005	Young Adult Literature	Shannon Hale	Princess Academy
2005	Young Adult Literature	Patricia Wiles	Funeral Home Evenings
2005	Young Adult Literature Honorable Mention	David Farland	Of Mice and Magic, Ravenspell Book One
2005	Young Adult Literature Honorable Mention	Dean Hughes	Search and Destroy
2006	Criticism	Patricia Karamesines	The Rhetoric of Stealing God
2006	Drama	Tim Slover	Treasure
2006	Film	Annie Poon	The Book of Visions
2006	Film Honorable Mention	Melissa Puente	Sisterz in Zion
2006	Film Honorable Mention	Tom Russell	Angie
2006	Novel	Toni Sorensen Brown	Redemption Road
2006	Novel Honorable Mention	Orson Scott Card	Empire
2006	Novel Honorable Mention	Brandon Sanderson	Mistborn
2006	Personal Essay	John Bennion	"Like the Lilies of the Field"
2006	Personal Essay Honorable Mention	Wilfried Decoo	"The Unspeakable"
2006	Personal Essay Honorable Mention	Patricia Karamesines	"The Birds of Summer"
2006	Service to AML	Angela Hallstrom	
2006	Short Fiction	Kristen Carson	"Atta Boy"
2006	Short Fiction Honorable Mention	Virginia Baker	"And Cry the Name of David"
2006	Short Fiction Honorable Mention	Heather Marx	"Brother Singh"
2006	Short Fiction Honorable Mention	Aaron Orullian	"Judgement Day"
2006	Smith-Pettit Foundation Award for Outstanding Contribution to Mormon Letters	Rick Walton	
2006	Special Award	James V. D'Arc, Blaine L. Gale, E. Hunter Hale, and Richard I. Hale	Trapped By the Mormons
2006	Young Adult Literature	Brandon Mull	Fablehaven
2006	Young Adult Literature Honorable Mention	Shannon Hale	River Secrets
2006	Young Adult Literature Honorable Mention	Janette Rallison	It's a Mall World After All
2007	Biography	Carol Madsen	An Advocate for Women: The Public Life of Emmeline B. Wells, 1870-1920
2007	Criticism	Terryl L. Givens	People of Paradox: The History of Mormon Culture
2007	Drama	Carol Pearson	Facing East
2007	Film	Helen Whitney	The Mormons
2007	Marilyn Brown Novel Award	Todd Petersen	Rift
2007	Marilyn Brown Novel Award Honorable Mention	Helynne Hollstein Hansen	Voices at the Crossroads
2007	Marilyn Brown Novel Award Honorable Mention	Janet Kay Jensen	Don't You Marry the Mormon Boys
2007	Novel	Coke Newell	On the Road to Heaven
2007	Novel Finalists	Shannon Hale	Austenland
2007	Novel Finalists	Dean Hughes	Before the Dawn
2007	Novel Finalists	Brandon Sanderson	The Well of Ascension
2007	Novel Finalists	Donald Smurthwaite	The Boxmaker's Son
2007	Novel Finalists	Roger Terry	I Am Not Wolf
2007	Novel Finalists	Alissa York	Effigy
2007	Novel Honorable Mention	Dean Hughes	Before the Dawn
2007	Novel Honorable Mention	Brandon Sanderson	The Well of Ascension
2007	Short Fiction	Lisa Torcasso Downing	"Clothing Esther"
2007	Short Fiction Finalists	Larry Menlove	"Drought", Dialogue 40:3 (Fall 2007)
2007	Short Fiction Finalists	Johnny Townsend	"The Buzzard Tree", Dialogue 40:4 (Winter 2007)
2007	Short Fiction Honorable Mention	Darin Cozzens	"Light of the New Day"
2007	Short Fiction Honorable Mention	Sigrid Olsen	"The Nature of Comets"
2007	Smith-Pettit Foundation Award for Outstanding Contribution to Mormon Letters	Anne Perry	
2007	Special Award	Segullah	
2007	Special Award Honorable Mention	Gideon Burton	Mormons and Film
2007	Young Adult Literature	Ann Dee Ellis	This Is What I Did
2007	Young Adult Literature Finalists	Olivia Birdsall	Notes on a Near-Life Experience
2007	Young Adult Literature Finalists	Jessica Day George	Dragon Slippers
2007	Young Adult Literature Finalists	Shannon Hale	Book of a Thousand Days
2007	Young Adult Literature Finalists	Brandon Mull	Fablehaven: Rise of the Evening Star
2007	Young Adult Literature Finalists	Louise Plummer	Finding Daddy
2007	Young Adult Literature Honorable Mention	Mette Ivie Harrison	The Princess and the Hound
2007	Young Adult Literature Honorable Mention	Brandon Sanderson	Alcatraz Vs. the Evil Librarians
2008	Drama	James Goldberg	Prodigal Son
2008	Film	Christian Vuissa	The Errand of Angels
2008	Film	Ron Williams	Happy Valley
2008	Lifetime AML Membership	Terryl L. Givens	
2008	Novel	Angela Hallstrom	Bound on Earth
2008	Personal Essay	Stephen Carter	"The Calling"
2008	Personal Essay	Patrick Madden	"A Sudden Pull Behind the Heart"
2008	Poetry	Neil Aitken	The Lost Country of Sight
2008	Poetry	Warren Hatch	Mapping the Bones of the World
2008	Short Fiction	Stephen Tuttle	"Amanuensis"
2008	Smith-Pettit Foundation Award for Outstanding Contribution to Mormon Letters	Douglas Thayer	
2008	Special Award in Criticism	Alan F. Keele	
2008	Special Award in History	Richard Turley, Jr., Glen M. Leonard, and Ronald W. Walker	Massacre at Mountain Meadows
2008	Special Award in Textual Criticism and Bibliography	Dean C. Jessee, Mark Ashurst-McGee, and Richard L. Jensen	The Joseph Smith Papers, Journals Series, vol. 1, Journals 1832-1839
2008	Youth Fiction	Brandon Mull	Fablehaven: The Grip of the Shadow Plague
2009	Drama	Melissa Leilani Larson	Little Happy Secrets
2009	Film	Jed Wells	Fire Creek
2009	Honorary Lifetime Membership	James D'Arc	
2009	Humor	Elna Baker	The New York Regional Mormon Singles Halloween Dance
2009	Memoir	Kathryn Soper	The Year My Son and I Were Born
2009	Novel	Todd Petersen	Rift
2009	Novel Honorable Mention	Jamie Ford	Hotel on the Corner of Bitter and Sweet
2009	Online Writing	Sandra Tayler	One Cobble at a Time
2009	Poetry	Lance Larsen	Backyard Alchemy
2009	Publishing	Christopher Bigelow	Zarahemla Books
2009	Service to AML	Kathleen Dalton-Woodbury	
2009	Short Fiction	Larry Menlove	"Path of Antelope, Pelican, and Moon"
2009	Smith-Pettit Foundation Award for Outstanding Contribution to Mormon Letters	Levi Peterson	
2009	Young Adult Literature	Carol Lynch Williams	The Chosen One

== 2010 ==
Smith-Pettit Award for Outstanding Contribution to Mormon Letters
- Richard Cracroft

Biography
- Marilyn Arnold for Bittersweet: A Daughter's Memoir

Criticism
- Grant Hardy for Understanding the Book of Mormon: A Reader's Guide

Drama / WebFilm
- Jeffrey Parkin & Jared Cardon for The Book of Jer3miah

Editing
- Eric W. Jepson for "Comics!" Sunstone #160
- Angela Hallstrom for Dispensation: Latter-day Fiction

Memoir
- George B. Handley for Home Waters: A Year of Recompenses on the Provo River

Novel
- Brady Udall for The Lonely Polygamist: A Novel

Online Writing
- Ardis Parshall for "Beards" on Keepapitchinin

Personal Essay
- Patrick Madden for Quotidiana

Poetry
- Marilyn Bushman-Carlton for Her Side of It: Poems

Service to AML
- Darlene Young

Short Fiction
- Jack Harrell for A Sense of Order and Other Stories

Short Fiction Honorable Mention
- Darin Cozzens for Light of the New Day and Other Stories

Young Adult Literature
- Ally Condie for Matched

== 2011 ==
Smith-Pettit Award for Outstanding Contribution to Mormon Letters
- Marilyn Brown

Honorary Lifetime Membership
- Gideon Burton

Biography
- Terryl L. Givens and Matthew J. Grow for Parley P. Pratt: The Apostle Paul of Mormonism

Autobiography
- Emma Lou Warner Thayne for The Place of Knowing: a Spiritual Autobiography

Criticism
- Brant A. Gardner for The Gift and Power : Translating the Book of Mormon

Film
- Tyler Measom and Jennilyn Merten for Sons of Perdition

Special Award in Graphical Narrative
- Michael Dalton Allred for a lifetime of comic art

Novel
- Steven L. Peck for The Scholar of Moab

Personal Essay
- Adam Miller, for the body of his work published in 2011

Poetry
- Tyler Chadwick for editing Fire in the Pasture: Twenty-first Century Mormon Poets (Peculiar Pages)

Short Story
- David G. Pace for "American Trinity"

Short Fiction
- Doug Thayer for Wasatch: Mormon Stories and a Novella

Special Award in Literary Journalism
- Andrew Hall

Young Adult Novel
- Robison Wells for Variant

Marilyn Brown Novel Award
- Paul Colt for Boots and Saddles: A Call to Glory

== 2012 ==
Smith–Pettit Foundation Award for Outstanding Contribution to Mormon Letters
- Eric Samuelsen

Lifetime AML Membership
- Mahonri Stewart
- Christopher Bigelow
Film
- Redemption, directed by Thomas Russell

Novel
- The Five Books of Jesus by James Goldberg

Devotional
- The God Who Weeps: How Mormonism Makes Sense of Life by Terryl and Fiona Givens

Poetry
- Amytis Leaves Her Garden by Karen Kelsay

Award in Adaptation
- The Street-Legal Version of Mormon’s Book by Michael Hicks

Drama
- Roof Overhead by Mahonri Stewart

Short Fiction
- "Godshift" by Nancy Fulda (originally appeared in Daily Science Fiction)

Young Adult Novel
- Vodnik by Bryce Moore

Memoir/Creative Non Fiction
- The Book of Mormon Girl by Joanna Brooks

Middle Grade Fiction Award
- False Prince by Jennifer A. Nielsen

Humor
- "Pat and Pete" by Larry Day (from his collection Day Dreaming: Tales from the Fourth Dementia)

== 2013 ==
Given out April 12, 2014.

Smith–Pettit Foundation Award for Outstanding Contribution to Mormon Letters
- Charlotte Hawkins England

Outstanding Achievement Award
- Dean Hughes

Creative non-fiction
- Melissa Dalton-Bradford for Global Mom: Eight Countries, Sixteen Addresses, Five Languages, One Family

Drama
- Ariel Mitchell for A Second Birth

Film
- Garrett Batty for The Saratov Approach

Special Award
- Scott Hales for The Garden of Enid

Novel
- Sarah Eden Longing for Home

Poetry
- Alex Caldiero sonosuono (awarded on March 28, 2015)

Other finalists
- Susan Elizabeth Howe Salt
- Lance Larsen Genius Loci

Short Fiction
- Brad R. Torgersen “The Chaplain’s Legacy”. Analog Science Fiction and Fact, July/August 2013 (awarded on March 28, 2015)

Other finalists
- “The Righteous Road” by Ryan Shoemaker, Silk Road Review, Summer/Fall 2013
- “Expiation” by Richard Dutcher, Sunstone 171, July 2013
- “Duplex” by Eric Freeze, Prairie Fire 34.1, Spring 2013
- “The Gift of Tongues” by Annette Haws, Dialogue: A Journal of Mormon Thought, Winter 2013

Young Adult Fiction
- Cindy M. Hogan Gravediggers

Young Adult Speculative Fiction
- Brandon Sanderson for The Rithmatist

== 2014 ==
Presented March 28, 2015, at the Utah Valley University Library.

Smith–Pettit Foundation Award for Outstanding Contribution to Mormon Letters
- Margaret Blair Young

AML Lifetime Achievement Award
- Lance Larsen
- Karen Rosenbaum

Comics
- iPlates, Volume 2: Prophets, Priests, Rebels, and Kings by Stephen Carter and Jett Atwood

Creative non-fiction
- Hemingway on a Bike by Eric Freeze

Other finalists
- To the Mountain: One Mormon Woman’s Search for Spirit by Phyllis Barber
- Way Below the Angels: The Pretty Clearly Troubled But Not Even Close to Tragic Confessions of a Real Live Mormon Missionary by Craig Harline
- Hippie Boy: A Girl’s Story by Ingrid Ricks

Criticism
- Ender’s World: Fresh Perspectives on the SF Classic Ender’s Game, Orson Scott Card, editor

Other finalists
- “Of Many Hearts and Many Minds: The Mormon Novel and the Post-Utopian Challenge of Assimilation” by Scott Hales. Dissertation, University of Cincinnati
- “Toward a Mormon Literary Theory” by Jack Harrell. BYU Studies Quarterly 53.3, 2014

Drama
- Pride and Prejudice by Melissa Leilani Larsen

Other finalists
- The Weaver of Raveloe by Erika Glenn and Melissa Leilani Larsen
- Single Wide by George Nelson and Jordan Kamalu
- Evening Eucalyptus by Mahonri Stewart

Film
- Saints and Soldiers: The Void, Ryan Little, director

Other finalists
- Inspired Guns, Adam White, director
- The Last Straw, Rob Diamond, director
- Meet the Mormons, Blair Treu, director
- Mitt, Greg Whiteley, director

Middle Grade Novel
- The Scandalous Sisterhood of Prickwillow Place by Julie Berry

- Honorable Mention: The End or Something Like That by Ann Dee Ellis
Other finalists
- Almost Super by Marion Jensen
- Time of the Fireflies by Kimberley Griffiths Little
- Sky Raiders by Brandon Mull

Novel
- City of Brick and Shadow by Tim Wirkus

- Honorable Mention: Words of Radiance by Brandon Sanderson
Other finalists
- A Song for Issy Bradley by Carys Bray
- The Bishop’s Wife by Mette Ivie Harrison
- The Thieves of Summer by Linda Sillitoe

Picture Book
- Girls Who Choose God: Stories of Courageous Women from the Bible by McArthur Krishna and Bethany Brady Spalding, illustrated by Kathleen Peterson

- Honorable Mention: The Princess in Black by Shannon Hale and Dean Hale, illustrated by LeUyen Pham
Other finalists
- Fetch by Adam Glendon Sidwell, illustrated by Edwin Rhemrev
- The World According to Musk Ox by Erin Cabatingan, illustrated by Matthew Myers
- The Tooth Fairy Wars by Kate Coombs, illustrated by Jake Parker

Poetry
- Picture Dictionary by Kristen Eliason

Other finalists
- Uncommon Prayer and Made Flesh: Sacrament and Poetics in Post-Reformation England by Kimberly Johnson
- In the Museum of Coming and Going by Laura Stott

Religious Non-Fiction
- Re-Reading Job: Understanding the Ancient World’s Greatest Poem by Michael Austin

Other finalists
- Seeking the Promised Land by David E. Campbell, John C. Green, and J. Quin Monson. Cambridge University Press
- Wresting the Angel by Terryl Givens

Short Fiction
- “Two-Dog Dose” by Steven L. Peck, Dialogue: A Journal of Mormon Thought, Spring 2014

Other finalists
- “Recollection” by Nancy Fulda, Carbide Tipped Pens
- “Anatomy” by Tim Wirkus, Weird Fiction Review, June 2014
- “Jesus Enough” by Levi S. Peterson, Dialogue: A Journal of Mormon Thought, Winter 2014

Young Adult General Novel
- Death Coming Up the Hill by Chris Crowe

Other finalists
- Forbidden by Kimberley Griffiths Little
- On the Fence by Kasie West
- Signed, Skye Harper by Carol Lynch Williams
- Stronger than You Know by Jolene Perry

Young Adult Speculative Novel
- Atlantia by Ally Condie

Other finalists
- The Paper Magician by Charlie Holmberg
- The Unhappening of Genesis Lee by Shallee McArthur
- Son of War, Daughter of Chaos by Janette Rallison
- Ruins by Dan Wells
- Illusions of Fate by Kiersten White

== 2015 ==
Presented March 5, 2016, at the Heber J. Grant building on Brigham Young University-Hawaii campus.

The Smith-Pettit Foundation Award for Outstanding Contribution to Mormon Letters
- Phyllis Barber

The Association for Mormon Letters Lifetime Achievement Award
- Donald R. Marshall

Special Awards for Scholarly Publishing
- The Oxford Handbook of Mormonism edited by Terryl L. Givens and Philip L. Barlow
- Nephi Anderson's Dorian: A Peculiar Edition With Annotated Text & Scholarship edited by Eric W. Jepson

Comics
- Dendō: One Year and One Half in Japan by Brittany Long Olsen

Other finalists
- Stripling Warrior by Brian Andersen and James Neish
- My Hot Date by Noah van Sciver

Creative Non-Fiction
- My Wife Wants You to Know I’m Happily Married by Joey Franklin

Other finalists
- The Accidental Terrorist by William Shunn
- Fresh Courage Take: New Directions by Mormon Women edited by Jamie Zvirzdin

Criticism
- Jana Riess "Mormon Popular Culture" from the first of the two nominated collections below

- The Oxford Handbook of Mormonism edited by Terryl L. Givens and Philip L. Barlow
Other finalists
- Nephi Anderson's Dorian: A Peculiar Edition With Annotated Text & Scholarship edited by Eric W. Jepson

Drama
- Pilot Program by Melissa Leilani Larson

Other finalists
- A/Version of Events by Matthew Ivan Bennett
- Princess Academy by Lisa Hall Hagen, adapted from Shannon Hale

Film
- Peace Officer, by Scott Christopherson and Brad Barber

Other finalists
- Christmas Eve, by Mitch Davis
- Freetown, by Garrett Batty
- Just Let Go, by Christopher S. Clark and Patrick Henry Parker
- Once I Was a Beehive, by Maclain Nelson

Lyrics
- The Desired Effect from Brandon Flowers

Other finalists
- Smoke + Mirrors from Imagine Dragons
- Ones and Sixes from Low
- Until I Live from The National Parks

Middle Grade Novel
- Mothman’s Curse by Christine Hayes

Other finalists
- A Night Divided by Jennifer A. Nielsen
- Mysteries of Cove: Fires of Invention by J. Scott Savage
- The Sound of Life and Everything by Krista Van Dolzer
- Survival Strategies of the Almost Brave by Jen White

Novel
- Sistering by Jennifer Quist

Other finalists
- The Agitated Heart by J. Scott Bronson
- Son of the Black Sword by Larry Correia
- His Right Hand by Mette Ivie Harrison

Picture Book
- Zombelina Dances the Nutcracker by Kristyn Crow

Other finalists
- Talon Wrestles an Anaconda by Auntie M (McArthur Krishna)
- Girls Who Choose God: Stories of strong women from the Book of Mormon by McArthur Krishna, Bethany Brady Spalding, and Kathleen Peterson
- Job Wanted by Teresa Bateman

Poetry
- Hive by Christina Stoddard

Other finalists
- Glyphs by Colin Douglas
- Lake of Fire: Landscape Meditations from the Great Basin Deserts of Nevada by Justin Evans
- Let Me Drown With Moses by James Goldberg

Religious Non-Fiction

- Traditions of the Fathers: The Book of Mormon as History by Brant A. Gardner

Other finalists

- The Oxford Handbook of Mormonism edited by Terryl L. Givens and Philip L. Barlow
- Postponing Heaven: The Three Nephites, the Bodhisattva, and the Mahdi by Jad Hatem, translated by Jonathon Penny
- Planted: Belief and Belonging in an Age of Doubt by Patrick Q. Mason
- Relational Grace: The Reciprocal and Binding Covenant of Charis by Brent J. Schmidt

Short Story
- "Remainder" by Spencer Hyde (Bellevue Literary Review)

Other finalists
- "The Naked Woman" by Theric Jepson (Pulp Literature)
- "Absolute Zero" by Scott Parkin (1st & Starlight)
- "An Immense Darkness" by Eric James Stone (Analog Science Fiction and Fact)

Short-Story Collection
- Mothers, Daughters, Sisters, Wives by Karen Rosenbaum

Other finalists
- Dark Watch and Other Mormon-American Stories by William Morris
- Wandering Realities: Mormonish Short Fiction by Steve L. Peck

Young Adult Novel
- The Storyspinner by Becky Wallace

Other finalists
- Shutter by Courtney Alameda
- Ink and Ashes by Valynne Maetani
- Firefight by Brandon Sanderson
- Fish Out of Water by Natalie Whipple

== 2016 ==
Presented at Utah Valley University, April 22, 2017.

The Smith-Pettit Foundation Award for Outstanding Contribution to Mormon Letters
- Orson Scott Card

AML Lifetime Achievement Award
- Susan Elizabeth Howe

Comics
- Precious Rascals by Anthony Holden

Other finalists
- Mormon Shorts, Vol. 1 by Scott Hales
- White Sand by Brandon Sanderson (story), Rik Hoskin (script), Julius Gopez (art), and Ross Campbell (colors)

Creative Non-fiction
- Sublime Physick by Patrick Madden

Honorable Mention
- Baring Witness: 36 Mormon Women Talk Candidly about Love, Sex and Marriage edited by Holly Welker
Other finalists
- Immortal for Quite Some Time by Scott Abbott
- The Latter Days: A Memoir by Judith Freeman
- One Hundred Birds Taught me to Fly by Ashley Mae Hoiland

Criticism
- Writing Ourselves: Essays on Creativity, Craft, and Mormonism by Jack Harrell

Drama
- Burn by Morag Shepherd

Other finalists
- Gregorian by Matthew Greene
- Kingdom of Heaven by Jenifer Nii
- The King’s Men by Javen Tanner

Film
- The Split House by Annie Poon

Other finalists
- Masterminds by Jared Hess
- The Next Door by Barrett Burgin
- Raiders! The Story of the Greatest Fan Film Ever Made by Jeremy Coon and Tim Skousen
- Saturday's Warrior by Michael Buster

Middle Grade Novel
- Summerlost by Ally Condie

Other finalists
- The Kidnap Plot: The Incredible Adventures of Clockwork Charlie by Dave Butler
- Cinnamon Moon by Tess Hilmo
- Red: The True Story of Red Riding Hood by Liesl Shurtliff

Novel
- Over Your Dead Body by Dan Wells

Other finalists
- Slave Queen by Heather. B. Moore
- Pigs When they Straddle the Air by Julie J. Nichols
- Daredevils by Shawn Vestal

Picture Book
- Our Heavenly Family, Our Earthly Families by McArthur Krishna and Bethany Brady Spalding. Illustrated by Caitlin Connolly

Other finalists
- What Would It Be Like by McArthur Krishna, Illustrated by Ayeshe Sadr & Ishaan Dasgupta
- She Stood for Freedom: The Untold Story of a Civil Rights Hero by Loki Mulholland and Angela Fairwell. Illustrated by Charlotte Janssen
- Defenders of the Family by Benjamin Hyrum White. Illustrated by Jay Fontana

Poetry
- Strange Terrain by Matthew James Babcock

Other finalists
- Leviathan by Neil Aitken
- flicker by Lisa Bickmore
- Who is the Dancer, What is the Dance by Alex Caldiero
- Kill February by Jeffrey Tucker

Religious Non-fiction
- As Iron Sharpens Iron: Listening to the Various Voices of Scripture edited by Julie M. Smith

Other finalists
- Nothing New Under the Sun: A Blunt Paraphrase of Ecclesiastes by Adam S. Miller
- The Ghost of Eternal Polygamy by Carol Lynn Pearson
- The Vision of All: Twenty-five Lectures on Isaiah in Nephi’s Record by Joseph M. Spencer

Special Award for Religious Non-fiction Publishing
- Let Your Hearts and Minds Expand: Reflections on Faith, Reason, Charity, and Beauty by Thomas F. Rogers, edited by Jonathan Langford and Linda Hunter Adams

Short Fiction
- "Kid Kirby" by Levi S. Peterson (Dialogue: A Journal of Mormon Thought, 49:2, Summer 2016)

Other finalists
- "And Thorns Will Grow There" by Emily Belanger, Sunstone #180, Spring 2016
- "Light as Wings" by Spencer Hyde, Glimmer Train. Fall 2016, #97
- "The Mandelbrot Set" by Heidi Naylor, Sunstone, #182, Fall 2016
- "Incomplete Slaughter" by Steven L. Peck, The Colored Lens, Summer 2016
- "Purytans" by Brad R. Torgersen, Analog: Science Fact and Fiction, July/Aug 2016

Short Fiction Collection
- The Last Blessing of J. Guyman LeGrand and Other Stories by Darin Cozzens

Other finalists
- Invisible Men by Eric Freeze
- Windows into Hell by various authors, edited by James Wymore

Video Series
- Last Chance U Greg Whiteley, director

Other finalists
- Adam & Eve Davey & Bianca Morrison Dillard, directors
- Studio C Jared Shores and Matt Meese, co-creators
- The Talking Fly Steve Olpin, director

Young Adult Novel
- The Serpent King by Jeff Zentner

Other finalists
- The Passion of Dolssa by Julie Berry
- And I Darken by Kiersten White

== 2017 ==
The final winners were presented March 23, 2018.

Smith-Pettit Foundation Award for Outstanding Contribution to Mormon Letters
- Lavina Fielding Anderson

AML Lifetime Achievement Award
- Robert Kirby

Novel
- Gilda Trillim: Shepherdess of Rats by Steven L. Peck (Roundfire Books)

- The Field is White by Claire Åkebrand (Kernpunct Press)
- Sins of Empire by Brian McClellan (Orbit/Hachette Book Press)
- Prayers in Bath by Luisa Perkins (Mormon Artists Group)
- Nothing Left to Lose by Dan Wells (Tor)

Short fiction
- "The Pew" by Alison Maeser Brimley (originally published in Dialogue)

- "Le Train à Grande Vitesse" R.A. Christmas (originally published in Dialogue)
- "The Thicket" by Bradeigh Godfrey (originally published in Sunstone)
- "Jane’s Journey" by Heidi Naylor (originally published in Sunstone)
- "Bishop Johansen Rescues a Lost Soul: A Tale of Pleasant Grove" by Steven L. Peck (originally published in Dialogue)

Creative nonfiction
- That We May Be One: A Gay Mormon’s Perspective on Faith and Family by Tom Christofferson

- Learning to Like Life: A Tribute to Lowell Bennion by George B. Handley
- The Burning Point by Tracy McKay
- Open Midnight: Where Ancestors and Wilderness Meet by Brooke Williams

Notable mentions
- Heterodoxologies: Essays by Matthew James Babcock
- The OCD Mormon: Finding healing and hope in the midst of anxiety by Kari Ferguson
- Do Clouds Rest? Dementiadventures with Mom by Michael Hicks

Religious nonfiction
- What is Mormonism? A Student’s Introduction by Patrick Q. Mason

- Feeding the Flock: The Foundations of Mormon Thought: Church and Praxis by Terryl L. Givens
- The Sun Has Burned My Skin by Adam S. Miller
- Perspectives on Mormon Theology: Apologetics edited by Blair G. Van Dyke and Loyd Isao Ericson

Middle-grade novel
- You May Already Be A Winner by Ann Dee Ellis (Dial Books for Young Readers)

- Under Locker and Key by Allison K. Hymas (Aladdin)
- Mustaches for Maddie by Chad Morris and Shelly Brown (Shadow Mountain)
- Forget Me Not by Ellie Terry (Feiwel and Friends)
- Paper Chains by Elaine Vickers (Harper)

Young-adult novel
- Goodbye Days by Jeff Zentner (Crown Books for Young Readers)

- Speak Easy, Speak Love by McKelle George (Greenwilow Books)
- The Duke of Bannerman Prep by Katie A. Nelson (Sky Pony Press)
- Last Star Burning by Caitlin Sangster (Simon Pulse)
- Now I Rise by Kiersten White (Delacorte Press)

Comics
- Real Friends by Shannon Hale and LeUyen Pham

- Batman ’66 / Legion of Super Heroes #1 (DC Comics) by Lee Allred, Michael Allred, Laura Allred
- The Garden of Enid: Adventures of a Weird Mormon Girl, Vol. 2. by Scott Hales
- Comic Diaries by Brittany Long Olsen
- Necropolis by Jake Wyatt and Kathryn Wyatt

Picture book
- Colour Blocked by Ashley Sorenson and David W. Miles

- Heroic Stories from The Book of Mormon by Shauna Gibby and Casey Nelson
- Quiet as a Church Mouse by Stephen Bevan and Jeff Harvey

Drama
- Virtue by Tim Slover

- The Drown’ed Book, or the History of William Shakespeare, Part Last by Mahonri Stewart
- Not One Drop by Morag Shepherd

Film
- Socorro written and directed by Marshal Davis

- The Man in the Camo Jacket written and directed by Russ Kendall
- Out of the Ground written and directed by Barrett Burgin
- A Pug & Wolf Christmas created by Davey and Bianca Morrison Dillard
- We Love You, Sally Carmichael! written by Daryn Tufts and directed by Christopher Gorham

Criticism
- “The Second Coming of Mormon Music,” by Michael Hicks from The Kimball Challenge at Fifty: Mormon Arts Center Essays (part of original nominee The Kimball Challenge at Fifty: Mormon Arts Center Essays from Mormon Arts Center)

- On the Problem and Promise of Alex Caldiero’s Sonosophy: Doing Dialogical Coperformative Ethnography; Or, Enter the Poetarium by Tyler Chadwick

Anthology
- Moth and Rust: Mormon Encounters with Death edited by Stephen Carter

- Seasons of Change: Stories of Transition from the Writers of Segullah edited by Shelah Mastny Miner and Sandra Clark Jergensen
- States of Deseret edited by Wm Morris

Poetry
- Mother's Milk by Rachel Hunt Steenblik

- Babbage’s Dream by Neil Aitken
- What Was Left of the Stars by Claire Åkebrand
- Ephemerist by Lisa Bickmore
- Owning the Moon by Linda Sillitoe

Special Award in Religious Non-Fiction Publishing
- Proceedings of the Mormon Theology Seminar, published by the Neal A. Maxwell Institute for Religious Scholarship’s Mormon Theology Seminar, Adam S. Miller, director

== 2018 ==
The final winners were presented March 30, 2019, in Berkeley, California.

AML Lifetime Achievement Award
- Carol Lynn Pearson

Smith-Pettit Foundation Award for Outstanding Contribution to Mormon Letters
- Melissa Leilani Larson

Special Award in Publishing
- Dove Song: Heavenly Mother in Mormon Poetry edited by Tyler Chadwick, Dayna Patterson, Martin Pulido (Peculiar Pages)

Novel
- Witchy Winter by D. J. Butler (Baen Books)

- The Apocalypse of Morgan Turner by Jennifer Quist (Linda Leith Publishing)
- The Infinite Future by Tim Wirkus (Penguin Press)

Short-fiction collections
- The Science of Lost Futures by Ryan Habermeyer (BOA Editions)

- Revolver by Heidi Naylor (BCC Press)
- Beyond the Lights by Ryan Shoemaker (No Record Press)

Short fiction
- "Thin Walls" by Alison Maeser Brimley (Western Humanities Review)

- "All Light and Darkness" by Amy Henrie Gillett (Writers of the Future)
- "Tower" by Ryan McIlvain (Sunstone)
- "Light Departure" by Ryan Shoemaker (Dialogue)

Drama
- Good Standing by Matthew Greene

- The Shower Principle by Ariel Mitchell

Poetry
- What the Body Knows by Lance Larsen (University of Tampa Press)

- The Lapidary’s Nosegay by Lara Candland (The Center for Literary Publishing, Colorado State University)
- The God Mask by Javen Tanner (Kelsay Books)
- Half-Hazard by Kristen Tracy (Graywolf Press)

Creative nonfiction
- Destroying Their God: How I Fought My Evil Half-Brother to Save my Children by Wallace Jeffs, Shauna Packer, Sherry Taylor

- Educated: A Memoir by Tara Westover
- How the Light Gets In by Keira Shae

Religious nonfiction
- An Early Resurrection: Life in Christ Before you Die by Adam S. Miller

- Faith Is Not Blind by Bruce C. Hafen and Marie K. Hafen
- Thou Art the Christ, the Son of the Living God: The Person and Work of Jesus in the New Testament edited by Eric D. Huntsman, Lincoln H. Blumell, and Tyler J. Griffin
- The Power of Godliness: Mormon Liturgy and Cosmology by Jonathan Stapley
- On Fire in Baltimore: Black Mormon Women and Conversion in a Raging City by Laura Rutter Strickling

Criticism
- Mormon Cinema: Origins to 1952 by Randy Astle

- "Low and the Hermeneutics of Silence" by Jacob Bender (Sunstone)
- "Isms and Prisms: A Mormon View on Writing about Nature and Women" by Ángel Chaparro-Sainz (Women’s Studies)
- "Mormon Poetry, 2012 to the Present" by Bert Fuller (Dialogue)
- A Book about the Film Monty Python’s Life of Brian: All the References from Assyrians to Zeffirelli by Darl Larsen

Comics
- One Dirty Tree by Noah Van Sciver (Uncivilized Books)

- Green Monk: Blood of the Martyrs by Brandon Dayton (Image Comics)
- Comic Diaries, Vol. 1 by Brittany Long Olsen (Self-published)
- SkyHeart Book One: The Search for the Star Seed by Jake Parker (Self-published)
- Cooties #11 by Nick Perkins

Documentary film
- Church & State

- Believer
- The Insufferable Groo
- States of America

Narrative film
- When She Runs

- Jane and Emma
- Long Haul
- Passenger Seat

Picture book
- The Dress and the Girl by Camille Andros and Julie Morstad (Abrams Books for Young Readers)

- Jesus is Born: A Flashlight Discovery Book by Shauna Gibby and Casey Nelson (Deseret Book)
- The Princess in Black and the Science Fair Scare by Shannon Hale, Dean Hale, LeUyen Pham (Candlewick Press)
- If Wendell Had a Walrus by Lori Mortensen and Matt Phelan (Henry Holt and Company)
- If Da Vinci Painted a Dinosaur by Amy Newbold and Greg Newbold (Tilbury House Publishers)

Middle-grade novel
- Squint by Chad Morris and Shelley Brown (Shadow Mountain)

- Where the Watermelons Grow by Cindy Baldwin (Harper)
- Wishes and Wellingtons by Julie Berry (Sourcebooks Young Readers)
- Resistance by Jennifer A. Nielsen (Scholastic Press)
- Grump: The (Fairly) True Tale of Snow White and the Seven Dwarves by Liesl Shurtliff (Alfred A. Knopf)

Young-adult novel
- The Dark Descent of Elizabeth Frankenstein by Kiersten White (Delacorte Press)

- Daughter of the Siren Queen by Tricia Levenseller (Feiwel and Friends)
- The Traitor’s Game by Jennifer A. Nielsen (Scholastic Press)
- Skyward by Brandon Sanderson (Delacorte Press)

== 2019 ==
The final winners were presented May 2, 2020, online, due to a cancellation of the 2020 AML Conference caused by the COVID-19 pandemic.

Smith-Pettit Foundation Award for Outstanding Contribution to Mormon Letters
- James Arrington

Lifetime Achievement Award
- R. A. Christmas

Special awards
in Literature and Art

HIVE ZINE

The ARCH-HIVE

in Literature and Performance

Thorns and Thistles: A Concert of Literature

Curated and compiled by James Goldberg and Nicole Wilkes Goldberg, directed by Ariel Rivera, music by Nicole Pinnell; supported by and performed at the Center for Latter-day Saint Arts

in Literature

Irreversible Things

Lisa Van Orman Hadley

Novel
- Muddy: Where Faith and Polygamy Collide by Dean Hughes (Deseret Book)

- The Cunning Man by D. J. Butler and Aaron Ritchey (Baen Books)
- Irreversible Things by Lisa Van Orman Hadley (Howling Bird Press)
- Maggie’s Place by Annette Haws (Covenant Communications)
- The Glovemaker by Ann Weisgarber (Skyhorse Publishing)

Short fiction
- "Next of Kin" by Karen Rosenbaum (Irreantum)

- "You Can Give Him a Kiss" by Alison Maeser Brimley (Sunstone)
- "My Father’s Liahona" by Danny Nelson (In Press Forward Saints: A Mormon Steampunk Anthology)
- "Bode and Iris" by Levi Peterson (Dialogue: A Journal of Mormon Thought)

Young-adult novel
- Lovely War by Julie Berry (Viking Press)

- Let’s Call it a Doomsday by Katie Henry (Katherine Tegan Books)
- Scars Like Wings by Erin Stewart (Delacorte)
- Waiting for Fitz by Spencer Hyde (Shadow Mountain)

Middle-grade novel
- Words on Fire by Jennifer A. Nielsen (Scholastic)

- Out to Get You: Thirteen Tales of Weirdness and Woe by Josh Allen (Holiday House)
- The Red Flower by Kate Coombs (Blue Sparrow Books)
- Time Castaways: #1 The Mona Lisa Key and #2 The Obsidian Compass by Liesl Shurtliff (HarperCollins)

Picture book
- Girls Who Choose God: Stories of Extraordinary Women from Church History by McArthur Krishna, Bethany Brady Spalding, Kathleen Peterson (Deseret Book)

- From a Small Seed: the Story of Eliza Hamilton by Camille Andros and Tessa Blackham (Henry Holt)
- If Monet Painted a Monster by Amy Newbold and Greg Newbold (Tilbury House Publishers)
- Lola Dutch: When I Grow Up by Kenneth Wright and Sarah Jane Wright (Bloomsbury Children’s Books)

Drama
- Project X by Taylor Hatch

- Tales of Tila by Carolyn Chatwin Murset
- Bitter Lemon by Melissa Leilani Larson

Narrative feature films
- The Other Side of Heaven 2: Fire of Faith directed by Mitch Davis

- The Fighting Preacher directed by T.C. Christensen
- Out of Liberty directed by Garrett Batty

Documentary feature films
- Jimmer: The Lonely Master directed by Scott Christopherson

- After Selma directed by Loki Mulholland
- The Jets: Making it Real directed by Kels Goodman

Short film
- "Father of Man" directed by Barrett Burgin

- "Paper Trails" directed by Heather Moser
- "Stickup Kid" directed by Daniel Tu
- "Man and Kin" directed by Max Johnson

Poetry
- Homespun and Angel Feathers by Darlene Young (BCC Press)

- Into the Sun: Poems Revised, Rearranged, and New by Colin Douglas (Waking Lion Press)
- After Earth by Michael Lavers (University of Tampa Press)
- The Tree at the Center by Kathryn Knight Sonntag (BCC Press)
- The Marriage of the Moon and the Field by Sunni Brown Wilkinson (Black Lawrence Press)

Criticism
- "Poetic Representations of Mormon Women in Late Nineteenth-Century Frontier America" by Amy Easton-Flake in Representing Rural Women (edited by Whitney Womack Smith and Margaret Thomas-Evans, Lexington Books)

- "Danites, Damsels, and World Domination: Mormons in the Dime Novels" by Michael Austin in Sunstone
- "Wrestling with God: Invoking Scriptural Mythos in LDS Literary Work" by James Goldberg in Remember the Revolution: Mormon Essays and Stories (self-published)
- Mormons, Musical Theatre, and Belonging in America by Jake Johnson (University of Illinois Press)
- Latter-day Screens: Gender, Sexuality, and Mediated Mormonism by Brenda R. Weber (Duke University Press)

Creative nonfiction
- Crossings: A Bald Asian-American Latter-day Saint Woman Scholar’s Ventures through Life, Death, Cancer, & and Motherhood by Melissa Wei-Tsing Inouye (Deseret Book/Maxwell Institute)

- Remember the Revolution: Mormon Essays and Stories by James Goldberg (self-published)
- A New Constellation: A Memoir by Ashley Mae Hoiland (BCC Press)

Religious nonfiction
- A Place to Belong: Reflections from Modern Latter-day Saint Women edited by Hollie Rhees Fluhman and Camille Fronk Olson (Deseret Book)

- If Truth Were a Child: Essays by George B. Handley (Maxwell Institute)
- The Next Mormons: How Millennials Are Changing the LDS Church by Jana Riess (Oxford University Press)

Comics
- That’s One Small Step for a Mom, One Giant Leap for Missionarykind by Kevin Beckstrom (self-published)

- Dick Tracy: Dead or Alive by Michael Allred, Lee Allred, Rich Tommaso, Laura Allred (IDW Publishing)
- Best Friends by Shannon Hale and LeUyen Pham (First Second)
- Super Elders & the Rise of Legion by Matt Vroom (self-published)

== 2020 ==
The final winners were presented June 5, 2021, as part of an online-only conference, due to the COVID-19 pandemic.

Lifetime Achievement
- John Serge Bennion

Smith-Pettit Foundation Award for Outstanding Contribution to Mormon Letters
- Steven L. Peck

Special Award in Religious Nonfiction
- The Book of Mormon: Brief Theological Introductions (Maxwell Institute)

General editors: Spencer Fluhman and Philip Barlow
Series editors: D. Morgan Davis, James E. Faulconer, Kristine Haglund, Joseph M. Spencer, Rosalynde Welch
Authors: Joseph M. Spencer, Terryl L. Givens, Deidre Nicole Green, Sharon J. Harris, James E. Faulconer, Kylie Turley, Mark Wrathall, Kimberly Berkey, Daniel Becerra, Adam S. Miller, Rosalynde Frandsen Welch, David F. Holland
Illustrator: Brian Kershisnik

Special Award in Nonfiction
- This is the Plate: Utah Food Traditions (University of Utah Press)

Editors: Carol Edison, Eric A. Eliason, Lynne S McNeill

Novel

- Bountiful by Charity Shumway (BCC Press)

Other finalists:
- The Desert Between Us by Phyllis Barber (University of Nevada Press)
- 116 by Rick Grunder (BookBaby)
- Sylvia by Twila Newey (BCC Press)
- A New Age of Miracles by Mahonri Stewart (Prospero Arts and Media)

Short story

- "The Water Between Us" by Ryan Shoemaker (Barzakh 12, Spring 2020)

Other finalists:
- "Every Nerve Singing" by Ryan Habermeyer (Fugue 58, Winter/Spring 2020)
- "Upcycling Death" by M.K. Hutchins (Brain Games: Stories to Astonish)
- "Certain Places" by William Morris (Dialogue 53:2, Summer 2020)
- "The Overcoat by Maurine Whipple (Irreantum 17.1, Fall 2020)

Short-fiction collection

- A Craving for Beauty: The Collected Writings of Maurine Whipple by Maurine Whipple, edited by Veda Hale, Andrew Hall, and Lynne Larson (BCC Press)

Other finalist:
- The Humans in the Walls and Other Stories by Eric James Stone (WordFire Press)

Poetry

- If Mother Braids a Waterfall by Dayna Patterson (Signature Books)

Other finalists:
- I, Taliesin by Michael R. Collings (Self-published)
- Ese golpe de luz by Gabriel González Núñez (FlowerSong Books)
- An Imperfect Roundness by Melody Newey Johnson (BCC Press)

Creative nonfiction

- Lies of the Magpie: A Memoir by Maleah Day Warner (Author Academy Elite)

Other finalists:
- Disparates by Patrick Madden (University of Nebraska Press)
- Wiving: A Memoir of Loving Then Leaving the Patriarchy by Caitlin Myer (Arcade)

Religious nonfiction

- Buried Treasures: Reading the Book of Mormon Again for the First Time by Michael Austin (BCC Press)

Other finalists:
- Mercy without End by Lavina Fielding Anderson (Signature Books)
- Visions in a Seer Stone; Joseph Smith and the Making of the Book of Mormon by William L. Davis (University of North Carolina Press)
- Tabernacles of Clay: Sexuality and Gender in Modern Mormonism by Taylor G. Petrey (University of North Carolina Press)
- The Book of Mormon For the Least of These, volume 1: 1 Nephi-Words of Mormon by Fatimah Salleh and Margaret Olsen Hemming (BCC Press)

Audiobook

- Clogs and Shawls: Mormons, Moorlands, and the Search for Zion by Ann Chamberlin, narrated by Jacqueline de Boer

Other finalists:
- Witchy War Series (Witchy Eye, Witchy Winter, Witchy Kingdom) by D. J. Butler, narrated by Courtney Patterson
- Kingdom of Nauvoo: The Rise and Fall of a Religious Empire on the American Frontier by Benjamin Park, narrated by Bob Souer
- The Book of Mormon for the Least of These, volume 1 by Fatimah Salleh and Margaret Olsen Hemmings, narrated by Margaret Olsen Hemmings
- Church History Department. Saints, Book 2, No Unhallowed Hand: 1846-1893 by the Church of Jesus Christ of Latter-day Saints, history department, narrated by Kirby Heyborne

Podcast (Note: Quotation from listing: "The podcast category is new to the AML Awards this year. The judges focused solely on podcast episodes published in 2020. Podcasts were required to have at least four episodes published last year to qualify. We want to acknowledge that the pandemic had an effect on podcast production, and, unfortunately, some podcasts that would have qualified in 2019 didn’t this year. Because it was a new category, we cast a fairly wide net, searching various podcast platforms for any podcast that focused on Mormonism in any capacity as well as podcasts produced by Mormon-related/adjacent organizations and individuals who are known to be Mormon. Unsurprisingly, many of the podcasts in the Mormon space focus on current issues, interviews, or Mormon history. Of those, we focused on podcasts that either featured Mormon writers or used interesting storytelling techniques. In creating the final list, we judged on such criteria as production values, literary/narrative value, and relevance to the field of Mormon literature. While they are not finalists, we also wanted to give a nod to podcasts that are doing interesting things in the space and are of special interest to Mormon literature, including Chapter and Verse (a daily poem on a verse or two of scripture); HIVE CAST (interesting production, strong focus on Mormon art); Face in Hat (in particular, the episode on the finale of The Good Place); and Zion’s Suffragists (especially the selection and presentation of documentary materials).")

- Dialogue Book Report from Dialogue: A Journal of Mormon Thought, hosted by Andrew Hall

Other finalists:
- The Center’s Studio Podcast from the Center for Latter-day Arts, hosted by Glen Nelson
- Mattathias Reads the World, hosted by Mattathias Westwood
- Unfinished: Short Creek, part of Witness Docs from Stitcher, hosted by Ash Sanders and Sarah Ventre

Picture book

- Nonsense: The Curious Story of Edward Gorey by Lori Mortensen and Chloe Bristol (HMH Books for Young Readers)

Other finalists:
- You’ll Find Me by Amanda Rawson Hill and Joanne Le-Vriethoff. (Magination Press)
- I’ll Walk with You by Carol Lynn Pearson and Jane Sanders (Gibbs Smith)
- All Aboard the Moonlight Train by Kristyn Crow and Annie Won (Doubleday Books for Young Readers)

Middle-grade novel

- 96 Miles by J. L. Esplin (Starscape/Tor Teen)

Other finalists:
- What Stars are Made Of by Sarah Allen (Farrar, Straus and Giroux)
- Beginners Welcome by Cindy Baldwin (HarperCollins)
- On these Magic Shores by Yamile Saied Mendez (Tu)
- The Elephant’s Girl by Celesta Rimington (Crown Books for Young Readers)

Young-adult novel

- Furia by Yamile Saied Méndez (Algonquin Young Readers)

Other finalists:
- Chasing Starlight by Teri Bailey Black (Tor Teen)
- Displaced by Dean Hughes (Atheneum Books)
- The Shadows Between Us by Tricia Levenseller (Feiwel and Friends)
- One Way or Another by Kara McDowell (Scholastic)

Comics

- Future Day Saints: Welcome to New Zion by Matt Page

Other finalists:
- Everything Is Going to Be Okay by Dani Jones
- Pillar of Light: Joseph Smith’s First Vision by Andrew G. Knaupp and Sal Velluto
- Magic in the Valley: The Story of Moira Green, Witch by Brittany Long Olsen

Criticism

- "Repicturing the Restoration: New Art to Expand our Understanding" by Anthony Sweat (BYU Religious Studies Center)

Other finalists:
- Spencer Kimball’s Record Collection: Essays on Mormon Music by Michael Hicks (Signature)
- "The 'New Woman' and the Woman’s Exponent: An Editorial Perspective" by Carol Cornwall Madsen (BYU Studies Quarterly, 59:3, 2000)
- Josephine Spencer: Her Collected Works, Vol. 1, 1887-1899 edited by Ardis E. Parshall and Michael Austin (BCC Press)
- A Craving for Beauty: The Collected Writings of Maurine Whipple edited by Veda Hale, Andrew Hall, and Lynne Larson (BCC Press)

Drama

- Mountain Law by Melissa Leilani Larson (Women’s Voices Play Festival, Orlando)

Other finalists:
- The Captivity of Hannah Dunston by Glen Nelson (liberetto) and Lansing McLoskey (music) (Guerilla Opera Company)
- Give Me Moonlight by Ariel Mitchell (Motor House, Baltimore)
- Escape from Planet Death by Tom Russell and BYU School of Media Arts Students (BYU)

Film

- Heart of Africa written by Tshoper Kabambi and Margaret Blair Young, directed Tshoper Kabambi

Other finalist:
- Gruff written and directed by Kohl Glass

== 2021 ==
The winners were announced July 23, 2022, at the AML Conference. For the fiction awards, the addition of bilingual judges led to the consideration of Spanish-language works published as far back as 2016. Additionally, with the return of a lyrics award, music was considered from both 2020 and 2021.

AML Lifetime Achievement Award
- Michael Austin

Smith-Pettit Foundation Award for Outstanding Contribution to Mormon Letters
- Darlene Young

Special award in fiction
Estampas del Libro de Mormón by Gabriel González Núñez

Special award in nonfiction

Eugene England: A Mormon Liberal by Kristine L. Haglund (University of Illinois Press)

Novel
Eleusis:The Long and Winding Road by R. de la Lanza (Intendencia de las Letras/Ulterior Editorial)

The Jupiter Knife by D. J. Butler and Aaron Michael Ritchie (Baen)
Picnic in the Ruins by Todd Robert Petersen (Counterpoint)
Noria by Juan Antonio Santoyo (Ulterior Editorial)

Short fiction
"Y no preguntes mas . . ." ("So Ask no More . . .") by Mario R. Montani (Irreantum)

"Good Shepherd Church" by Riley Clay (Irreantum)
"Between Glory and Ruin" James Goldberg (A Desolating Sickness: Stories of Pandemic)
"Skillick’s Bride" Rachel Helps (Note: This is the first work of interactive fiction nominated for an AML Award.)
"The Wall" by Spencer Hyde (Image)

Young Adult Novel
Beyond the Mapped Stars by Rosalyn Eves (Knopf)

A Sisterhood of Secret Ambitions by Sheena Boekweg (Feiwel & Friends)
Where I Belong Marcia Mickelson (Carolrhoda Lab)
Fadeaway by E. B. Vickers (Knopf)
In the Wild Light by Jeff Zentner (Crown Books)

Middle Grade Novel
Cece Rios and the Desert of Souls by Kaela Rivera (HarperCollins)

Breathing Underwater by Sarah Allen (Farrar, Straus and Giroux)
Horace & Bunwinkle: The Case of the Rascally Raccoon by P.J. Gardner (illustrated by Dave Mottram) (Balzer + Bray)
Friends Forever by Shannon Hale (illustrated by Leuyen Pham) (First Second)
Tips for Magicians by Celesta Rimington (Crown Books for Young Readers)

Picture Book
A Child of God by Chantel Bonner, Mauli Bonner, and Morgan Bissant (Shadow Mountain/Ensign Peak)

The Boy and the Sea by Camile Andros and Amy June Bates (Abrams)
We Believe: Illustrated Articles of Faith by Annie Poon (Covenant)
Thankful by Elaine Vickers and Samantha Cotterill (Paula Wiseman Books)
10 Little Disciples by Sierra Wilson (Ambassador-Emerald Intl)

Film
Witnesses (directed by Mark Goodman, written by Mitch Davis)

His Name is Green Flake (directed and written by Mauli Bonner)
Maggie on Stratford Ave (directed and written by James May)
Scenes from the Glittering World (directed by Jared Jakins)
The Touch of the Master’s Hand (directed and written by Gregory Barnes)

Drama
REDEEMHer: How I Screwed up my perfect Mormon life by Tatum Langton

The King Stag by Janine Sobeck Knighton
Gin Mummy by Melissa Leilani Larson
1820: The Musical (book: George Nelson; music and lyrics: Kayliann Lowe Juarez, Doug Lowe, and Kendra Lowe)

Poetry
The Ache and The Wing by Sunni Brown Wilkinson (Sundress Publications)

Beneath the Falls by Mark D. Bennion (Resource publications)
Down Their Spears by Jared Pearce (Cyberwit)

Podcast
This Is the Gospel (LDS Living)

Faith Matters hosted by Aubrey Chaves, Tim Chaves, and Terryl Givens; produced by Bill Turnbull and Branson Hirschi (Faith Matters Foundation)
Latter-day Contemplation hosted by Christopher Hurtado and Riley Risto; created by Shiloh Logan and Riley Risto; edited by Christian Hutardo (Latter-day Peace Studies)
Leading Saints hosted by Kurt Francom; executive produced by Kurt Francom; produced by Lillian Angelovic
Sunstone Mormon History (Sunstone Education Foundation)

Comics
Friends Forever by Shannon Hale (illustrated by Leuyen Pham) (First Second)

Future Day Saints: The Gnomlaumite Crystal by Matt Page
The Glass Looker: Collected Tales of Joseph Smith by Mark Elwood

Criticism
Vardis Fisher: A Mormon Novelist by Michael Austin (University of Illinois Press)

“The Case for Resurrection: A Mormon Movie Manifesto” by Barrett Burgin in Mormonism and the Movies, edited by Chris Wei, (BCC Press)
“Theologies of the Afterlife in Mormon Women’s Late-Nineteenth-Century Poetry” Amy Easton-Flake in Nineteenth-Century American Women Writers and Theologies of the Afterlife (Routledge)
Mormonism in SF edited by Adam McClain for SFRA Review 51:3, Summer 2021.

Creative Nonfiction
Zion Earth, Zen Sky by Charles Shirō Inouye (Neal A. Maxwell Institute)

Blossom as the Cliffrose: Mormon Legacies and the Beckoning Wild edited by Karin Anderson and Danielle Dubrasky (Torrey House Press)
Ninety-Nine Fire Hoops by Allison Hong Merrill (She Writes Press)
Scrupulous: My Obsessive Compulsion for God by Taylor Kerby (BCC Press)
Where the Soul Hungers: One Doctor’s Journey from Atheism to Faith by Samuel M. Brown (Neal A. Maxwell Institute)

Religious Nonfiction
Proclaim Peace: The Restoration’s Answer to an Age of Conflict by Patrick Q. Mason and J. David Pulsipher (Maxwell Institute)

Stretching the Heavens: The Life of Eugene England and the Crisis of Modern Mormonism by Terryl L. Givens (University of North Carolina Press)
The Restoration: God’s Call to the 21st Century World by Patrick Q. Mason (Faith Matters)
The Anatomy of Book of Mormon Theology, Vols. 1 and 2 Joseph M. Spencer (Greg Kofford Books)
Humility: A Practical Approach by Shawn Tucker (BCC Press)

Lyrics
Fragility by Christian Asplund

Therapy Sessions by David Archuleta
A Fish of Earth by Emily Brown
Pressure Machine by The Killers
Strangest Congregations by Andrew Wiscombe

== 2022 ==
Award winners were announced April 29, 2023 at a virtual conference.

AML Lifetime Achievement Award

Michael Hicks

Smith-Pettit Foundation Award for Outstanding Contribution to Mormon Letters

Stephen R. Carter

Novel
The History of Honey Spring by Darin Cozzens (Zarahemla Books)

And All Eternity Shook by Jacob L. Bender (Ships of Hagoth)
The Resurrection Box by Declan Hyde (Gypsy Fox Publishing)
Heike’s Void by Steven L. Peck (BCC Press)

Short fiction
"The Intelligences" ("As inteligências") by Marcelo Bighetti (translated by Kent S. Larsen) (Irreantum)

"The Profile of Daria Black" by Michaelbrent Collings (In Gilded Glass: Twisted Myths and Shattered Fairytales, WordFire Press)
"The Algorithms of Happiness" by Ryan Habermeyer (Iron Horse Literary Review)
"Worlds Without End" by Tygan Shelton (Irreantum)
"Twilight of the Eye Creature" by Nathan Shumate (Cold Fusion Media)

Short-fiction collection
The Year They Gave Women the Priesthood and Other Stories by Michael Fillerup (Signature Books)

Down the Arches of the Years by Lee Allred (Hemelein Publications)
The Darkest Abyss: Strange Mormon Stories by William Morris (BCC Press)
Sharks in an Inland Sea by Lehua Parker (Hemelein Publications)

Drama
The Wrong People Have Money by Reed McColm. Varscona Theatre, Alberta. Shadow Theatre.

A. D. 16 by Bekah Brunstetter (book) and Cinco Paul (story, music, and lyrics). Olney Theatre Center, Olney, Maryland.
Mestiza, or Mixed by Melissa Leilani Larson. Plan-B Theatre, Salt Lake City.
Mother, Mother: The Many Mothers of Maude by Julie Jensen. Rose Wagner Performing Arts Center, Salt Lake City. Pygmalion Productions.

Creative Nonfiction
The Burning Book by Jason Olson and James Goldberg (BCC Press)

The Precarious Walk: Essays from Sand and Sun by Phyllis Barber (Torrey House Press)
Wineskin: Freakin’ Jesus in the ‘60s and ‘70s by Michael Hicks (Signature Books)
East Winds: A Global Quest to Reckon with Marriage by Rachel Rueckert (BCC Press)

Religious Nonfiction
Ancient Christians: An Introduction for Latter-day Saints edited by Jason R. Combs, Mark D. Ellison, Cathrine Gines Taylor, and Kristian S. Heal. (Maxwell Institute)

Book of Mormon Studies: An Introduction and Guide by Daniel Becerra, Amy Easton-Flake, Nicholas J. Frederick, and Joseph M. Spencer. (Brigham Young University Religious Studies Center)
Mormon Women at the Crossroads: Global Narratives and the Power of Connectedness edited by Caroline Kline. (University of Illinois Press)
Original Grace: An Experiment in Restoration Thinking by Adam S. Miller (Maxwell Institute/Deseret Book)
The Book of Mormon for the Least of These: Vol. 2, Mosiah-Alma by Fatimah Salleh and Margaret Olsen Hemming (BCC Press)

Criticism (long-form)
Mormonism, Empathy, and Aesthetics: Beholding the Body by Gary Ettari (Palgrave Macmillan)

Experiment upon the Word by Frederik S. Kleiner (BCC Press)
John Held Jr.’s Fiction by Glen Nelson (Center for Latter-day Saint Art)

Criticism (short-form)
"The Divine Feminine in Mormon Art" by Margaret Olsen Hemming (Dialogue: A Journal of Mormon Thought)

"Lands Before Time: Plan of Salvation Typology in the Films of Don Bluth" by Randy Astle (Irreantum)
"Apologia Unmasked: Brigham City, Film Noir and the Future of Mormon Cinema" by Lane Welch (Utah Monthly)
"The Secular Syllabus and the Sacred Book: Literary Scholars Approach the Book of Mormon" by Rosalynde Welch (Journal of Book of Mormon Studies)

Young-adult novel
Beneath the Wide Silk Sky by Emily Inouye Huey (Scholastic)

Wakers by Orson Scott Card (Margaret K. McElderry Books)
The Silence that Binds Us by Joanna Ho (HarperTeen)
This Might Get Awkward by Kara McDowell (Scholastic)
The Words We Keep by Erin Stewart (Declorate)

Middle-grade novel
Willis Wilbur Wows the World by Lindsey Leavitt (Penguin Workshop)

The Legend of the Dream Giants by Dustin Hansen (Shadow Mountain)
The Hope of Elephants by Amanda Rawson Hill (Charlesbridge)
Lines of Courage by Jennifer A. Nielsen (Scholastic)
Secrets of the Looking Glass by J. Scott Savage (Shadow Mountain)

Picture book
Bedtime Stories for Girls of Destiny by Raeleigh Wilkinson (Cedar Fort)

A Book, Too, Can Be A Star: The Story of Madeleine L’Engle and the Making of A Wrinkle in Time by Charlotte Jones Voiklis and Jennifer Adams (authors), Andelina Lirius (illustrator)
Mud! by Annie Bailey (author) and Jen Corace (illustrator) (Abrams Appleseed)
Pirates Don’t Dance by Shawna J. C. Tenney (Sleeping Bear)
Pretty Perfect Kitty Corn by Shannon Hale and LeUyen Pham (Abrams)

Comics
Joseph Smith and the Mormons by Noah Van Sciver (Abrams ComicArts)

The Glass Looker: Volume 2 by Mark Elwood (Luman Books)
The Manderfield Devil by Rachel Allen Everett (independently published)
Beware the Eye of Odin Doug Wagner (writer) and Tim Odland (artist) (Image Comics)

Poetry
Fatal by Kimberly Johnson (Persea Books)

Litany with Wings by Tyler Chadwick (BCC Press)
Golden Ax by Rio Cortez (Penguin)
Drift Migration by Danielle Beazer Dubrasky (Ashland Poetry Press)
Hemingway in Paradise and other Mormon Poems by Scott Hales (Mormon Lit Lab)

Special Award in Publishing—Republication
The Corianton Saga edited by Ardis E. Parshall (BCC Press)

A Vision Splendid: The Discourses of David O. McKay edited by Anne-Marie Wright Lampropoulos (Greg Kofford Books)
The Bacillus of Beauty by Harriet Stark, edited by Joe Monson (Hemelein Publications)

Film
The Mission. Tania Anderson, director. Danish Bear Productions.

The Brilliant Darkness! (Dem Toi Ruc Ro!). Aaron Toronto, director, co-writer, and co-producer. Nha Uyen Ly Nguyen, co-writer, co-producer, and lead actor.
Cheer. Season 2. Greg Whiteley, creator, executive producer, director. One Potato Productions, Netflix.
Lucy and Whitney. Parker Gehring, director and writer.
WWJD. Davey Morrison and Bianca Dillard, directors. Written by Davey Morrison and Anna Lewis. Based on a play by Anna Christina Kohler Lewis.

Podcast
This Global Latter-day Life (Caroline Kline, host and writer; Claremont Graduate University, Claremont Mormon Studies; Dialogue Podcast Network)

Come Follow Me Kids (Bay Kids)
Leading Saints (Kurt Francom, host/executive producer; Lillian Angelovic, producer)
Tribe of Testimonies (Andrea Hales, host)
Y Religion (Anthony Sweat, host and producer; Brigham Young University Religious Education)

== 2023 ==
The 2023 awards finalists and winners can be found here: https://www.associationmormonletters.org/2024/08/2023-aml-award-winners/

== 2024 ==
The 2024 awards finalists and winners can be found here: https://www.associationmormonletters.org/2025/05/2024-aml-award-winners/

== See also ==
- Whitney Awards
