= Slover =

Slover is a surname. Notable people with the surname include:

- Isaac Slover (1780–1854), American fur trader
- Karl Slover (1918–2011), Slovak-born American actor
- Tim Slover, American playwright and professor of theatre studies
