= The ARCH-HIVE =

- Founders: Camilla Stark and Laz
- Website: www.arch-hive.net

The Arch-Hive, stylized as the ARCH-HIVE, is an artist collective in Utah. They are known for art exhibitions and zines that explore experiences with culture of the Church of Jesus Christ of Latter-day Saints and their beliefs.

== Founding ==
The anonymous artist Laz and fellow artist Camilla Stark founded the art collective in 2019. Influenced by the 1960s Art and Belief movement, their goals for the collective include challenging binary thinking, fostering inclusion of unconventional perspectives, and helping other amateur artists. The group has gone on to create eclectic and esoteric art, prose, and poetry about topics ranging from Utah Lake to scrupulosity.

== Zines ==
The ARCH-HIVE's zine series, The HIVE ZINE, publishes poetry, prose, and art across various styles. Volume one of the series was published in July 2018 and the series remains ongoing. The goal of the zines is to depict experiences and perspectives within the Church through art that is both engaging and accessible. The zines include the use of the Deseret alphabet and digital collage and explore themes including church ecology, horror, and folk magic. Their eighth zine featured versions of the First Vision by untrained artists.

== Shows ==
The ARCH-HIVE shows have featured art by J. Kirk Richards, Lisa Delong, Annie Poon, and Matt Page, among others.

The collective's first show was in March 2019; entitled "Holy Hell," the show explored the intersection of the sacred and the profane. Their second show, "Via Crucis," took place in March 2020 and was themed around the traditional stations of the cross. "Midwinter at the Gates of Dawn" appeared in December 2021. In a review of the show at 15 Bytes, Jesslyn Low said that the works were strong and beautiful, and that they were not only relevant to current communities but to a broader human journey as well.

In December 2022, their month-long exhibit "I Am Bound Upon a Wheel of Fire: Obsessive Compulsion of the Soul" featured more than 25 artists showcasing works about living with OCD, particularly scrupulosity. Mediums represented at the show included sculpture, paintings, interactive exhibits, digital art, and poetry. The artists and poets featured in the show also contributed to an audio exhibit wherein some of their real intrusive thoughts were vocalized and engineered to echo, loop, and layer in an effort to evoke the experience of OCD. According to Harrison Epstein from the Daily Herald, the show seemed to resonate with the community, as its opening saw a "constant stream of guests" with a line extending out of the venue and into the street.

== Awards ==
The ARCH-HIVE won an award in Literature and Art from the Association for Mormon Letters for their work in 2019. The award citation said that their zine series was confident in their use of self acceptance and determination to revive arts within the Church, and said that the art of many forms was a "reflection of the zeitgeist."
