= Morag =

Morag may refer to:

== Fiction ==
- Morag Bellingham, a character on the Australian television soap opera Home and Away (1988–present)
- Mòrag Ladair, a character from the 2017 video game Xenoblade Chronicles 2
- Morag the Tulgah Witch, a character on the animated series Ewoks (1985–1986)
- Morag, a character in the 1993 Star Trek: The Next Generation episode "Aquiel"
- Morag, the main antagonist in the original campaign of the 2002 video game Neverwinter Nights
- Morag (Marvel Cinematic Universe), a fictional planet in the Marvel Cinematic Universe films Guardians of the Galaxy (2014) and Avengers: Endgame (2019)
- Morag, the main villainess in the 2021 animated film The Loud House Movie
- The Morag Tong, a joinable faction in the 2002 video game The Elder Scrolls III: Morrowind

== People with the given name ==
- Morag Shepherd, Scottish playwright
- Morag McLellan, Scottish field hockey player
- Morag McLaren, Scottish singer
- Morag Beaton, Scottish-Australian soprano

== Other uses ==
- Morąg (German: Mohrungen), a city in Poland
- Morag, a monster reported to inhabit Loch Morar in Scotland
- Morag, a former Israeli settlement in Gush Katif
- Megan and Morag, sheep that were the first mammals to be cloned from differentiated cells
- Sherman Morag, the Israeli name for the Sherman Crab tank; see Post–World War II Sherman tanks § Support tanks
- Mòrag, a Scottish female given name, sometimes translated as Sarah.
