= Ryan McIlvain =

American novelist

- Born: 1982 (age 43–44)
- Occupation: Novelist
- Writing career
- Genres: Fiction and Nonfiction
- Website: ryanmcilvain.com

Ryan McIlvain (born 1982) is an American novelist and essayist. He is the author of Elders (2013) and The Radicals (2018). A former recipient of the Wallace Stegner Fellowship in Fiction at Stanford University, McIlvain is currently an Associate Professor of English and Writing at the University of Tampa.

== Awards ==
- 2013: Center for Fiction First Novel Prize for Elders (finalist)
- 2018: AML Award for Tower (Sunstone) (finalist)
