= Annie Poon =

American animator based in New York City

- Education: School of Visual Arts
- Notable work: The Book of Visions (2006); The Split House (2016)
- Awards: AML Awards – Best Film; 2006 The Book of Visions AML Awards – Best Film; 2016 The Split House
- Website: Official website

Annie Poon is an American animator based in New York City. Her short "Runaway Bathtub" is in the permanent collection of the New York Museum of Modern Art. Poon's works have appeared in other various venues, including the National Gallery, the Brooklyn Museum, the New Museum, and the Museum of Arts and Design. The Chicago International Children's Festival, Nickelodeon, and PBS have shown her cartoons. She has taught animation and comics workshops and given motivational lectures to artists.

== Early life and education ==
Poon grew up with eight other siblings, including her twin sister in New Canaan, Connecticut and studied painting at the School of Visual Arts. At age five, after a lesson on professions, Poon decided that she wanted to be an artist. Once, her mother excused her from school to visit the Metropolitan Museum for a day, which deeply impressed young Poon. Her mother would give her a nickel for each painter she could identify. Poon loved Shrinky Dinks, Colorforms, stickers and paper and scissors. Poon cites the drawings of Shel Silverstein, Quentin Blake, and John Lennon as her main influences.

== Animations ==
Like other traditional animation, Poon's stop-motion animations are very labor-intensive; five seconds of animation require about a day of work. Poon's works draws on the playful happiness of childhood daydreams. Inspired by games she played with her sister in the bath as a child, Poon created her short "Runaway Bathtub." It is in the permanent collection of the New York Museum of Modern Art.

Poon belongs to the Church of Jesus Christ of Latter-day Saints (LDS church) and her works often draw on her religion. "The Book of Visions," created over the course of a year, depicts angels appearing visions to Joan of Arc, Black Elk, and Joseph Smith. Teenage Poon felt that these accounts showed that God valued teenagers' ideas and feelings. At the end of the film, the man "reading" the accounts flies out of the window, which according to Poon, represents how anyone can travel to another spiritual state. "Die Wicked Die" is a series of animations portraying "action packed" scriptural violence influenced by "Itchy and Scratchy." "The Shiny Bicycle" was commissioned by the LDS church and depicts a boy who fails to paint his bicycle, but with hard work is able to make it look shiny again.

"The Split House" depicts Poon's own struggle with mental illness, specifically, with schizoaffective disorder. Poon worked on the animation over the course of more than ten years. The animation shows the subconscious thoughts of a young woman who transforms into an owl.

=== Oh Puppy! ===
Poon calls her naïve and passionate "Puppy" character her alter ego. Puppy's strips were first published on Fredflare.com. The strips have been collected in a book titled Oh Puppy!, and Puppy has appeared in three animations: "Oh Puppy" the rap video, "Puppy's Super Delicious Valentine's Biscuits," and "Daisy Daddy."

== Awards ==
Poon's works have won a number of awards.

Year	Organization	Award title, Category	Work	Result	Refs
2006	Association for Mormon Letters	AML Awards, Best Film of 2006	The Book of Visions	Won	
2016	Association for Mormon Letters	AML Awards, Best Film of 2016	The Split House	Won	

== Personal life ==
Poon studied at the School of Visual Arts in Manhattan. She served a mission for the Church of Jesus Christ of Latter-day Saints in Croatia.
