= Michael Hicks (musicologist) =

American professor of music, poet and artist

Michael Dustin Hicks (born 1956) is an American professor of music, poet and artist, who has studied a broad array of topics, although his work on music and the Church of Jesus Christ of Latter-day Saints has been groundbreaking in that field.

Hicks was born and raised in California. Hicks has a DMA from the University of Illinois at Urbana-Champaign. He has been on the music faculty at Brigham Young University (BYU) since 1984. Hicks has a bachelor's degree from BYU. He has been a full professor at BYU since 1996.

Hicks first book was Mormonism and Music: A History (1989). This work received awards from both the Mormon History Association and the Association of Mormon Letters. In 1990 his work Sixties Rock: Garage, Psychedelic and Other Satisfactions was published. This book received significant coverage in Music and History: Bridging the Disciplines edited by Jeffrey H. Jackson and Stanley C Pelkey. His book Henry Cowell: Bohemian was published in 2002. In 2012, his work Christian Wolff was published. In 2015, his work The Mormon Tabernacle Choir: A Biography was published. All these works have been published by Illinois University Press.

Hicks has created a variety of chamber and solo works.

From 2007 to 2010, Hicks was editor of the journal American Music published by the University of Illinois (not to be confused with the Journal of the Society for American Music which used to be published as American Music).

Upon being given a lifetime achievement award by the Association for Mormon Letters, he described himself as "a somewhat failed believer but an adequate saint," and expressed a hope that the award suggested, as had been said of William Maxwell, a martyrdom to quality.

== Books ==
- Mormonism and Music: A History (1989)
- Sixties Rock: Garage, Psychedelic, and Other Satisfactions (1999)
- Henry Cowell, Bohemian (2002)
- Christian Wolff, co-authored with Christian Asplund (2012)
- The Street-Legal Version of Mormon’s Book (2012)
- The Mormon Tabernacle Choir: A Biography (2015)
- Do Clouds Rest? Dementiadventures with Mom (2017)
- Spencer Kimball’s Record Collection: Essays on Mormon Music (2020)
- Wineskin: Freakin' Jesus in the '60s and '70s (2022)

== Sources ==
- BYU faculty page of Hicks
- Wall Street Journal review of Hicks' book on the Mormon Tabernacle Choir
- New Music Box article
- AML Lifetime Achievement Award citation
