= The Insufferable Groo =

- Directed by: Scott Christopherson
- Produced by: Jared Hess; Jared Harris; Eric Robertson
- Starring: Stephen Groo; Jared Hess; Jack Black
- Music by: Eric Robertson
- Production company: Saint Cloud
- Release date: June 8, 2018
- Running time: 98 minutes
- Country: United States
- Language: English

The Insufferable Groo is a 2018 American documentary directed by Scott Christopherson and produced by Jared Hess, Jared Harris, and Eric Robertson. The film follows the work of Utah filmmaker Stephen Groo as he creates the film Unexpected Race and seeks to have Jack Black play a role in his film.

The film premiered at the Sheffield Doc/Fest in June 2018.

== Premise ==
Stephen Groo is a filmmaker living in Provo, Utah, United States. At the beginning of the film, his goal is to create The Unexpected Race, a film about the love story between a human and elf. The film follows the production process of The Unexpected Race and Groo's efforts and ultimate success in having Jack Black appear in the film.

== Music ==
The film's soundtrack was composed by Eric Robertson.
