= Fred Flare =

Defunct online store (1998-2013)

Fredflare.com
- Website type: Online Store
- Owners: Keith Carollo and Chris Bick
- Website: http://fredflare.com/
- Registration: optional

Fredflare.com was an online store named after Fred Astaire located in Brooklyn, New York started in 1998 by owners Chris Bick & Keith Carollo. Originally selling beverage coasters off the back of a bicycle in SoHo, New York, Fred Flare sold a variety of items including accessories, men's and women's clothing, stationery and home decor. The company sold many different brand names, such as products from Deborah Lippmann, Volcom, Kid Robot, Lomography & Chronicle Books. Notable people such as Amy Sedaris have also done guest product lines for the company. In 2008, a Fred Flare store opened in Greenpoint, Brooklyn but closed in 2011. The website was later shut down in 2013.

== Fred Flare Boombox ==
The Fred Flare Boombox was an original site that allowed the shopper to listen to music from its "boombox" at the bottom of their site. The "boombox" had music ranging from indie, alternative dance and pop music. Most of the music found was from unknown bands.
