= Edward L. Hart =

American poet (1916–2008)

- Born: December 28, 1916; Bloomington, Idaho, U.S.
- Died: March 9, 2008 (aged 91); Provo, Utah, U.S.
- Education: BA, University of Utah; MA, University of Michigan; Rhodes Scholar
- Occupations: English professor at Brigham Young University (BYU), poet
- Writing career
- Language: English
- Notable work: "Our Savior's Love" which is #113 in the current LDS hymnbook

Edward LeRoy Hart (December 28, 1916 – March 9, 2008) was a Latter-day Saint poet. He wrote the words to "Our Savior's Love" which is #113 in the current LDS hymnbook. He was also an English professor at Brigham Young University (BYU) and wrote many poems.

== Early life ==
Hart was born in Bloomington, Idaho. He received a bachelor's degree from the University of Utah, where he initially studied economics, but decided to change his major even though his close advisor Lowell L. Bennion urged him to let writing be just a free time activity. Hart was also on the track team at the University of Utah.

== Education ==
Hart then went on to receive a master's degree from the University of Michigan, receiving that degree in 1941. He was then a Rhodes scholar at the University of Oxford, starting in 1945. Originally Hart would have gone to Oxford in 1939 but the outbreak of World War II postponed those plans.

Hart was a United States Naval intelligence officer during World War II.

== Career ==
Hart began his career as a professor at the University of Washington and then joined the BYU faculty in 1952. Besides his long career at BYU, Hart also taught for a time at the University of California, Berkeley. Although he retired in 1982, Hart continued to teach one honors class a year at BYU until 1995.

Hart's earliest poem "A Lesson In Praise" dates to 1954. He published a collection of poems on the occasion of the 150th anniversary of the founding of the LDS Church. Hart edited Minor Lives: A Collection of Biographies that was published in 1971 by Harvard University Press. He also wrote a hymn entitled "The Fullness of Times" on that occasion. He also edited the journals and published them along with a biography of James H. Hart and published works in BYU Studies and the Mormon Letters Annual of the Association for Mormon Letters.

Among Hart's callings in the LDS Church he served from 1980–1988 as a bishop of a student ward at BYU.

== Personal life ==
In December 1944 Hart married Eleanor May Coleman in Washington, D.C., they were sealed in the Salt Lake Temple the following August. Eleanor and their young son Richard went with Hart to Oxford, and his next son, Paul, was born while he was studying there. Edward and Eleanor also had two daughters, Barbara and Patricia. Eleanor died in 1990. In 1993 he married Leah Bryson née Yates. She died in 2001. In 2002 Hart married Frances Cannon Lee.

Hart died on March 9, 2008, in Provo, Utah.
