= Morag Shepherd =

American dramatist

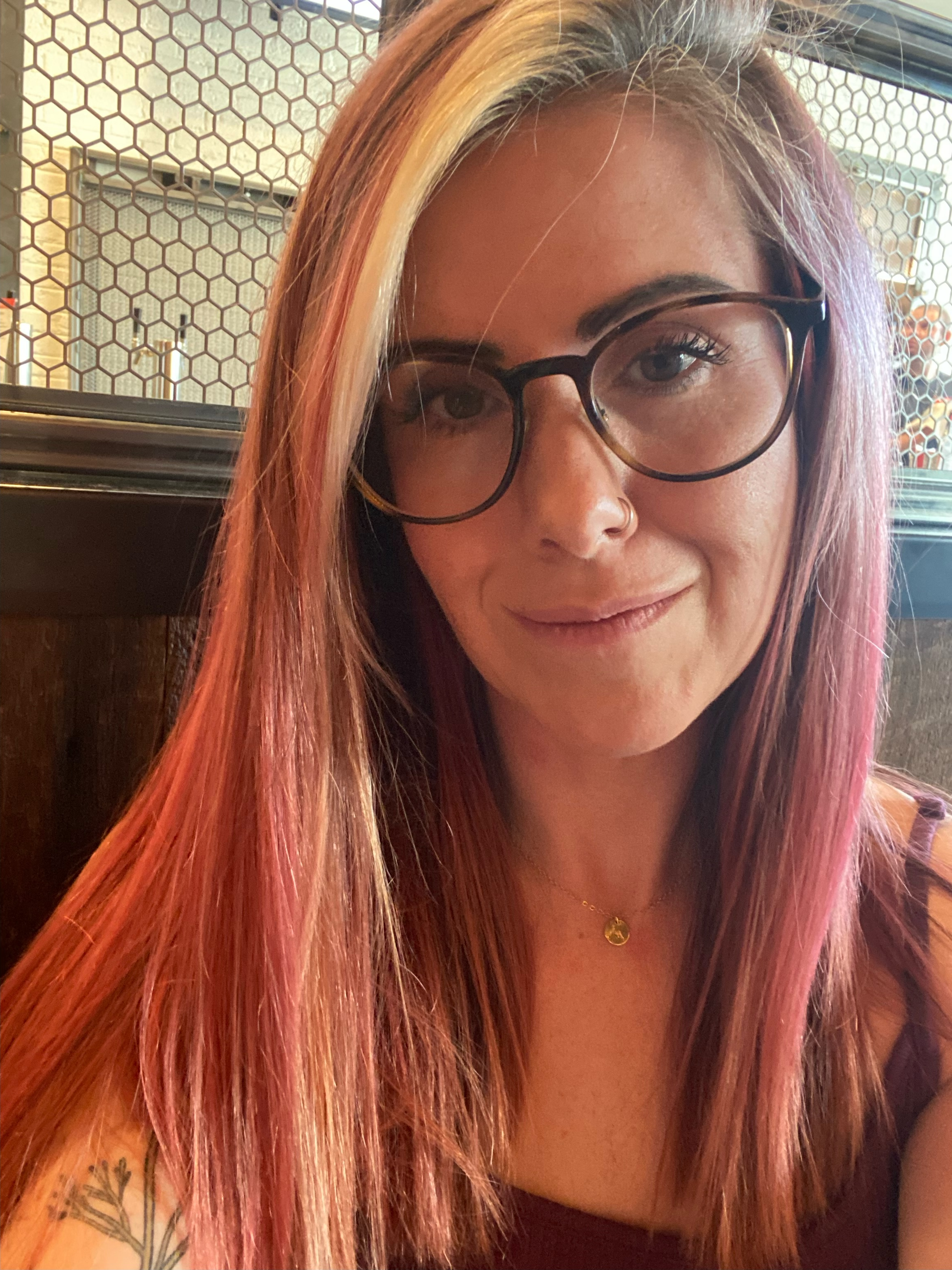
- Born: 1979 (age 46–47); Edinburgh, Scotland
- Education: Brigham Young University (MA)
- Occupations: Playwright, director, professor
- Children: 2
- Writing career
- Notable awards: Association for Mormon Letters (2016), Vera Mayhew Hinkley Playwrighting Award

Morag Shepherd is a Scottish-American playwright, screenwriter, producer and director.

== Biography ==
Shepherd was born in Edinburgh, Scotland in 1979, and raised in rural Halkirk, Scotland and England before moving to Philadelphia, Pennsylvania in her teenage years.

She later attended Brigham Young University in Provo, Utah where she wrote her Master's thesis on Edward Albee and the American absurdist tradition.

She has two children.

== Career ==
Shepherd's plays have been produced in the western United States as well as New York.

In 2015 Shepherd co-founded Sackerson, a Salt Lake City-based theatre company. She has been Sackerson's writer in residence since that time.

In 2021 she co-founded Immigrant's Daughter, a second Salt Lake City-based theatre company. For Immigrant's Daughter she has served as a director, producer, and writer.

=== Plays ===
==== Poppy's In The Sand ====
Shepherd's one-act play Poppy's In the Sand opened in 2015 in Salt Lake City. It later moved to a run in San Diego at the San Diego International Fringe Festival. Poppy's tells the story of a family dealing with the emotional fallout from a traumatic event and the text grapples with themes of faulty and unreliable memory.

==== The Worst Thing I've Ever Done ====
In 2016, The Worst Thing I've Ever Done, a play written by Shepherd and other Utah playwrights, premiered in Salt Lake City. The presentation of the piece was considered experimental as it was performed for only a single audience member at a time. Originally debuting in March, the piece was revived later that year in August as part of the Great Salt Lake Fringe Festival.

==== Burn ====
Shepherd's next play, Burn, debuted at Sackerson in September 2016. The play follows Allison, a mother, as she struggles to simultaneously balance her sense of self, her mental health, her familial relationships, her loss of faith and a skin condition that leaves her susceptible to burns. Its original run was extended several times.

Shepherd was later awarded the 2016 AML award for Drama for Burn.

==== Not One Drop ====
In 2017 Shepherd won the Plan-B Theatre grant from the David Ross Fetzer Foundation for her play Not One Drop, which debuted at Plan-B in March of that year. Barbara M. Bannon, writing for the Salt Lake Tribune, called Shepherd's writing "clever, pithy, and poetic."

Not One Drop was also nominated for an AML award in the drama category.

==== Do You Want To See Me Naked? ====
Shepherd wrote and directed 2017's Do You Want To See Me Naked? which opened in Salt Lake City before moving on to runs in Tucson, and New York City. The one-woman show about self-doubt and self-acceptance also played in Provo, Utah as well as being later revived in Salt Lake.

During its initial run at The Great Salt Lake Fringe Festival, it was awarded Best One-Person Show as well as the Critic's Choice award. Barbara M. Bannon, writing for the Salt Lake Tribune, praised Shepherd's writing as being "constantly sharp and compelling".

==== How Long Can You Stand On The Train Tracks? : A Game For Two Sisters ====
2017 also saw Shepherd's play How Long Can You Stand On The Train Tracks? : A Game For Two Sisters onstage in a co-production from Salt Lake City theatre companies Flying Bobcat Theatrical Laboratory and Sackerson. The play premiered at The University of Utah's Babcock Theatre. Part of the impetus for the play originated in childhood games she and her siblings would play on train tracks in rural Scotland. The piece was called "haunted and fiercely playful".

==== Hindsight ====
Shepherd's next play, Hindsight, premiered in Salt Lake City in 2018. Produced by Sackerson, the piece followed a budding relationship between a young man and woman while literally navigating the streets of downtown Salt Lake City. During the performance audience members moved throughout the city using buses, the city's light-rail system, as well as their own feet. The play's original run lasted for four months and was entirely sold out. It received nearly universal acclaim.

==== A Brief Waltz In A Little Room ====
A Brief Waltz In A Little Room : Twenty-Three Short Plays About Walter Eyer, co-written and co-directed by Shepherd, was produced in 2019. The play ran for six months between August 2019 and January 2020. It opened at The Gateway (Salt Lake City) in a series of dressing rooms in the back of an art gallery that had formerly been an Anthropologie clothing store. A Brief Waltz In A Little Room put audience members in the titular role of Walter Eyer and played with themes of identity, love, secrets and double existences.

==== Cherry Wine In Paper Cups ====
Shepherd and Sackerson responded to the challenges of producing theatre during the COVID-19 pandemic with Shepherd's play Cherry Wine In Paper Cups, which opened in September 2021 on the grounds of the Salt Lake City Public Library. The play was performed outdoors using socially distanced seating as audience members listened to the play through headphones which filtered both actor dialogue and music into their ears. The plot of the piece, described as an 'upbeat romance story', concerned two young potential lovers as they navigated their relationship through a series of stops and spurts. To further enhance performer safety the production employed actors that were already living together.

The play was later produced at xMPL Theatre in March, 2023 in Irvine, California.

==== My Brother Was A Vampire ====
2022 saw the premiere of Shepherd's play, My Brother Was A Vampire at Plan-B Theatre in Salt Lake City. The play was described as a 'horror-comedy' and its run was entirely sold out. Critics called the show 'striking', and 'lean and mean' and Shepherd's writing was praised as 'avoiding the realist trap with...sudden shifts and strange powers'.

==== Worship ====
In the fall of 2023, Shepherd's play Worship, produced in partnership by Immigrant's Daughter and The Utah Arts Alliance, received its premiere in Salt Lake City. The play was inspired by the case of a Brigham Young University professor who sexually abused students. Shepherd herself said the play was about '...the people and ideas we choose to revere, and breaking down how and why we make idols of certain people'. The show was well-received with The Utah Review naming it as Utah's top arts production of 2023.

=== Other work ===
Shepherd made her screenwriting debut with Blue Door, directed by Sohrab Mirmont, nephew of Abbas Kiarostami.

In 2015 her audio play, Before The Beep, was produced by Sackerson in Salt Lake City. The play was performed entirely by voice messages, allowing audiences to phone in to listen to daily scenes over 30 days.

Her children's play, Flora Meets A Bee, was commissioned and produced by Plan-B Theatre in 2019. The play toured elementary schools throughout Utah from October 2019 to February 2020. Originally scheduled to tour until May 2020, the play's schedule was ended early due to COVID-19.

== Works ==
=== Full-length plays ===
- Roofsliding (2008)
- Burn (2016)
- Not One Drop (2017)
- How Long Can You Stand On The Train Tracks? : A Game For Two Sisters (2017)
- Hindsight (2018)
- A Brief Waltz In A Little Room (2019) (Co-Authored)
- Cherry Wine In Paper Cups (2020)
- My Brother Was A Vampire (2022)
- Worship (2023)
- In Your Dreams (2024) (Co-Authored)
- The Big Quiet (2025)

=== Other works ===
- Blue Door (2011) – Screenplay
- Before The Beep (2015) – Audio Play
- Poppy's In The Sand (2015) – One Act Play
- Yellow Umbrellas (2016) – One Act Play
- The Worst Thing I've Ever Done (2016) (Co-Authored) – Short Play
- (in)divisible (2017) (Co-Authored) – Contributed Monologues
- Do You Want To See Me Naked? (2017) – One Act Play
- Flora Meets A Bee (2019) – Children's Play
- The Distance Of The Moon (2019) – Contributed Material
- Thank You, Theobromine (2019) – Contributed Material
