= Stronger Than You Know =

2014 young adult book by Jolene Perry

- First edition cover
- Author: Jolene Perry
- Genre: Young adult novel
- Publisher: Albert Whitman & Company
- Publication date: September 1, 2014
- ISBN: 978-0-8075-3155-6

Stronger Than You Know is a 2014 young adult novel by Jolene Perry, published by Albert Whitman & Company. The story deals with the recovery of a fifteen-year-old girl, named Joy, who has experienced sexual and physical abuse and neglect.

== Summary ==
When the story begins, Joy has been taken away from her abusive mother and is adjusting to a new life with her aunt and uncle. Joy had been neglected and physically abused by her mother and was sexually abused by her mother's boyfriend. This left Joy afraid of men and full of fear. She also experiences anxiety because of her emotional scars and reveals that her abusive life was what she considered "normal." Joy's anxiety can be triggered by "seemingly insignificant everyday circumstances," like certain smells, or being bumped into while walking from class to class in high school.

Joy is able to heal though the connections she makes with others. Her aunt and uncle, for example, are patient and kind. Her aunt, Nicole, and her uncle, Rob, have twins named Tara and Trent. Even though her new family is so kind to her, at first Joy is not sure how to trust them until Rob shares his own pain about his sister who committed suicide. Joy is also helped through her experience with therapy.

Stronger Than You Know is told in the first person, with Joy as the narrator. Library Media Connection wrote that her "internal dialog and self-doubt ring true." Joy's past is told through flashbacks, where she was basically a prisoner confined to her mother's trailer.

== Reception ==
The Deseret News wrote that Stronger Than You Know handled the abuse that Joy faced "accurately and deftly." Booklist called the novel a "moving survival story." School Library Journal added that Joy's "phobias and difficulties are depicted with honesty and sympathy."

Kirkus Reviews felt that the characters in the story were complex. They described Joy as "suitably self-effacing without being ostentatious." The Bulletin of the Center for Children's Books says that Perry creates a "rare" portrait of the "way compassionate, functional families work and the good effects they can produce."
