= Neil Aitken =

Canadian poet, editor, and translator

- Born: 1974 (age 51–52); Vancouver
- Occupations: Poet, editor, and translator

Neil Aitken (born 1974 in Vancouver, British Columbia) is a Canadian poet, editor, and translator. He founded Boxcar Poetry Review. His first book, The Lost Country of Sight, won the 2007 Philip Levine Prize for Poetry.

== Biography ==
=== Early life and education ===
Aitken was born in Vancouver in 1974 and was raised in Saudi Arabia, Taiwan, Canada, and the United States. His father was of Scottish and English descent and his mother was of Chinese descent. He had a younger sister. He attended elementary and secondary school in Regina. Throughout high school, he enjoyed painting. As an undergraduate, he studied Computer Engineering with a minor in Mathematics.

He worked as a computer games programmer for several years. In 2004, he quit his position to study at the University of California, Riverside, where he earned an MFA. He earned a PhD in Literature & Creative Writing from the University of Southern California.

=== Literature career ===
Aitken's first book, The Lost Country of Sight, won the 2007 Philip Levine Prize. In 2016, he published Babbage’s Dream, a semi-finalist for the Anthony Hecht Prize. He founded Boxcar Poetry Review. Aitken and Chinese poet-translator Ming Di translated The Book of Cranes: Selected Poems of Zang Di. In 2011, Aitken was awarded the DJS Translation Prize for "his translations of contemporary Chinese poetry." His short poetry collection Leviathan won the 2017 Elgin Award in the Chapbook section.

== See also ==
- Canadian literature
- Canadian poetry
- List of Canadian poets
- List of Canadian writers
