= Life, Love, and the Pursuit of Free Throws =

2005 novel by Janette Rallison

Life, Love, and the Pursuit of Free Throws is a 2005 novel by Janette Rallison for children or young adults. It is told from the alternating points of view of Josie and Cami, high school students and best friends, one a basketball star and the other envious of her skills, and describes their relationship and a competition to appear with a sports star.

== Plot summary ==
Josie repeatedly attempts to impress her crush, Ethan Lancaster, with little success, even tripping down an up escalator at the mall to try to get his attention, while her best friend Cami is doing everything she can to become the high scorer on the basketball team so that she will be chosen to participate in a demonstration with the coach's old friend and her idol, Rebecca Lobo. Cami agrees to help Josie get Ethan's affection, while Josie agrees to help Cami with basketball. However, Ethan starts flirting with Cami, who has also been secretly crushing on him as well and cannot resist flirting back, even though she knows she is being a bad friend to Josie. Josie finds out about Cami and Ethan's relationship, and seeks her revenge by telling Ethan that Cami has kleptomania. The girls get into a fight, and Josie starts hanging out with her annoying science fair project partner, Frederick Vine, whom Josie finds is actually a good friend. Cami befriends her delusional science project partner, Caroline. Later, a smug Erica Green, the sidekick of Cami and Josie's worst enemy, Ashley Holt, reveals that Ethan was only paying attention to Cami to make Ashley jealous. Ashley had recently broken up with Ethan, but now the couple's back together.

On a road trip to a basketball game and the Rebecca Lobo demonstration, Josie and Cami are stranded at a gas station as the result of a nasty trick played by Ashley. While at the gas station, Cami and Josie apologize to each other and become friends again. Daniel Dixon, one of Frederick's friends whom Josie immediately takes a liking to, finally picks them up and drives them to the game just in time. It ends happily, with Cami being chosen to play with Rebecca Lobo and Josie and Daniel crushing on each other.

== Characters ==
- Josie Caraway – Josie's a high school freshman in high school who is talented at basketball and is said to be in all honors classes. She's tall with long brown hair and Cami's her best friend.
- Cami – Cami's a high school freshman whose real name is Camilla. Josie's her best friend, and they both had a crush on Ethan Lancaster for most of the book. Cami's said to have a very neat and tidy room and likes to keep things clean, loves making lists, and also adores Rebecca Lobo.
- Ashley Holt – Ashley is Josie and Cami's worst enemy. She's popular and said to be very pretty.
- Ethan Lancaster – An extremely handsome boy with dark, wavy hair whom Josie and Cami crush on for most of the novel. His EX girlfriend is Ashley Holt.
- Frederick Vine – Frederick, dubbed "The Whine" because of his frequent complaints, is Josie's science project partner. He plays chess.
- Caroline – Caroline is Cami's science project partner. She is seen as delusional and wants to be a pet psychic when she grows up.
- Daniel Dixon – Known as "Daniel the Knight Slayer" to his chess buddies, Daniel is described as having surfer-boy hair. He's an extremely good chess player, and says that his secret is that he never takes revenge on anyone.
- Erica Green – Erica is Ashley's best friend/sidekick.
- Kristen, Sadie, and Jack Caraway – Kristen, Sadie, and Jack are Josie's younger siblings. Kristen's eleven, Sadie's nine, and Jack's the youngest at five.
- Kevin – Kevin is Cami's older brother.

== Cameos ==
Rebecca Lobo has a cameo appearance in this novel.

== Critical reaction ==
Kirkus Reviews praised its "crisp, witty comic voice" while complaining that the narration failed to differentiate the two characters' voices. School Library Journal called it a "fun, realistic, sometimes poignant story". Booklist said it "is light entertainment, short on characterization but full of myriad awkward moments in romance" and "will please middle-school girls. Library Media Connection recommended it as a book for girls interested in sports.

== Release details ==
- 2004, USA, Walker Publishing, ISBN 0-8027-8927-7, ISBN 978-0-8027-8927-3 (hardcover)
