= Louise Plummer =

American novelist

Louise Plummer (1942-2025) was an American author of young adult fiction, essayist, artist, and retired associate professor of English at Brigham Young University. Known for her wit, candor, and encouraging mentorship, she influenced generations of students and writers.

Born in Utrecht, Netherlands, Plummer immigrated to the United States with her family in 1948. She grew up in Salt Lake City, Utah, as the oldest of nine children. She began college at Brigham Young University and the University of Utah but later completed both her bachelor's and master's degrees in English with a creative writing emphasis at the University of Minnesota.

In 1985, she and her husband, Tom Plummer, moved to Provo, Utah, where they both joined the faculty at BYU. That same year, Plummer won the Delacorte Press First Young Adult Novel Contest with her debut manuscript, The Romantic Obsessions and Humiliations of Annie Sehlmeier. The book later became a children's choice book with both the New York Public Library and the International Reading Association. Her follow-up novels received multiple accolades, including ALA Best Book for Young Adults, School Library Journal Best Book, Utah Arts Council awards, and honors from the Association for Mormon Letters.

Plummer also published nonfiction books, essays, and a children's book. She was a popular speaker in academic and Latter-day Saint settings and taught workshops and memoir courses, often volunteering her time.

Plummer was a member of The Church of Jesus Christ of Latter-day Saints. She died on March 20, 2025, at the age of 82.

== Books ==
Young Adult Novels:

- The Romantic Obsessions and Humiliations of Annie Sehlmeier (1987)
- My Name Is Sus5an Smith, the 5 Is Silent (1991)
- The Unlikely Romance of Kate Bjorkman (1995)
- A Dance for Three (2000)
- Finding Daddy (2007)

Nonfiction Works:

- Thoughts of a Grasshopper: Essays and Oddities (1992)
- Eating Chocolates and Dancing in the Kitchen: sketches of marriage and family (Introduction) (1998)
- You Are Boring, But You Are Uniquely Boring: 25 Models for Writing Your Memoir (2017)

Children's Books:

- A Walk to Grow On (Care Bear Cousins) (1985)

Anthologies and Contributions:

- To Rejoice as Women: Talks from the 1994 BYU Women's Conference (Contributor) (1995)
