= Caitlin Connolly =

American painter and sculptor

- Born: Utah, U.S.
- Education: University of Utah
- Known for: Painting, sculpting
- Spouse: Robbie Connolly
- Website: caitlinconnolly.com

Caitlin Connolly is an American painter and sculptor.

Connolly grew up in Utah with three brothers. Her mother was a flute teacher and Connolly began playing the flute when she was five years old. Connolly obtained a BFA in painting and drawing from the University of Utah in 2009.

== Career ==
Connolly’s art career began to blossom as she began having work appear in galleries, shows, and on book covers. Connolly explains, “Art often becomes my medium for exploring purpose in life and moments of truth.” Connolly struggled with infertility for seven years and the themes of struggle, motherhood, and female empowerment run through her artwork. The shape of an upward-pointing triangle sometimes permeates Connolly’s work and became a subtle nod to the female figure with a woman’s shape rendered as an upward-pointing triangle.

Connolly has been commissioned to create artwork for numerous books including Our Heavenly Family, Our Earthly Families and Women at Church: Magnifying LDS Women’s Local Impact. In 2020, she was included in an art show of 35 Utah artists, age 35 and under, at the Finch Lane Gallery that was notable for being left unseen during the COVID-19 pandemic. On May 24, 2023, Connolly received an award at the Utah Governor’s Mansion Artist Awards event.

== Personal life ==
Connolly is married to musician Robbie Connolly of Fictionist and The Killers. She is a member of the Church of Jesus Christ of Latter-day Saints. The couple have two children and live in Provo, Utah.
