= Darrell Spencer =

American novelist and short story writer (born 1947)

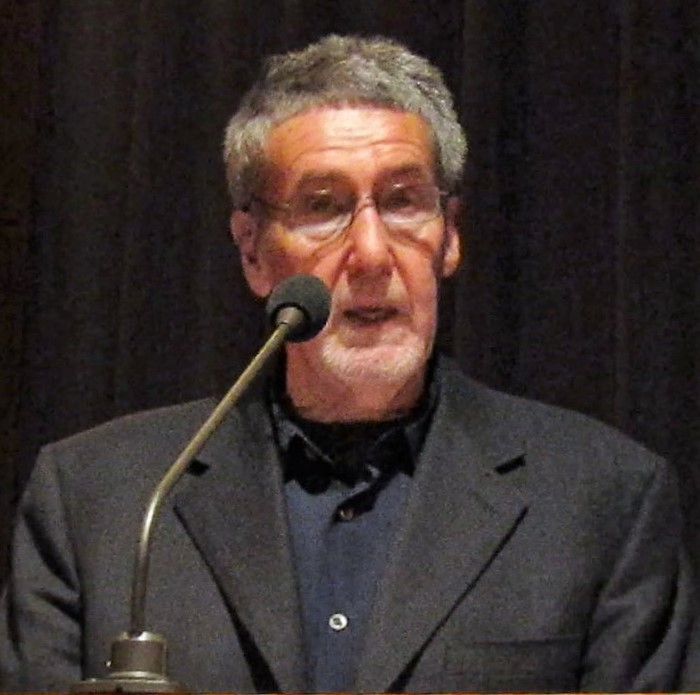
- Spencer in 2018
- Born: 1947 (age 78–79)
- Education: University of Utah (PhD)
- Occupations: Novelist; short story writer
- Writing career
- Notable awards: Flannery O'Connor Award for Short Fiction (2000); Drue Heinz Literature Prize (2004)

Darrell Spencer (born 1947) is an American novelist and short story writer. He is best known for his short stories, which are widely published in literary journals and have been the recipients of several awards.

== Life ==
He received his Ph.D. from the University of Utah.

Spencer recently retired from teaching literature and creative writing at Ohio University. He has been praised by Michael Chabon for "[possessing] a remarkable ear for the cadence of everyday speech," and by The New York Times Book Review for his "writing [which] crackles with freshness and lucidity, featuring characters who slide into one another in random encounters and relationships."

He currently teaches creative writing at Southern Utah University.

== Awards ==
- 2004 Drue Heinz Literature Prize
- 2010 Nevada Writers Hall of Fame
- 2000 Flannery O'Connor Award for Short Fiction.

== Bibliography ==
- A Woman Packing a Pistol (1987), a collection of short stories. ISBN 978-0-937872-36-9
- Our Secret's Out (1993), a collection of short stories. ISBN 978-0-8262-0927-6
- Caution: Men in Trees (2002), a collection of short stories. ISBN 978-0-393-32145-6
- Bring Your Legs with You (2004), interconnected short stories. ISBN 978-0-8229-4242-9
- One Mile Past Dangerous Curve (2005), a novel. ISBN 978-0-472-11472-6
