= Dialogue (magazine) =

US art magazine

Dialogue was an American art magazine founded and published in Akron, and later Columbus, Ohio. It covered the arts of Ohio, Michigan, Indiana, western Pennsylvania, Kentucky and northern Illinois. Founded in 1978 by the artist Don Harvey and museum executive and former Artforum editor John Coplans, it began having financial troubles in 2002, changed hands, and ceased publication entirely in June 2004.
