= Marian Robertson Wilson =

American linguist

Alice Marian Robertson Wilson (August 20, 1926 – April 8, 2013) was an American cellist, linguist and teacher most notable role as music editor of the eight-volume Coptic Encyclopedia. She was a daughter of Leroy Robertson and has written scholarly analyses of his works.

== Life and musical career ==
Robertson was born in Morgan, Utah, and initially studied piano. At age ten, when her younger sister was born, her father bought a half-size cello that was allegedly for the newborn Karen but her father urged her to play it until her sister became big enough. She joined the Utah Symphony Orchestra in 1947. In 1950 she went to study in France on a Fulbright scholarship; that year her father wrote a cello composition for her to play.

Marian Robertson married W. Keith Wilson, a retired Utah probation officer, in San Francisco in 1979. Their marriage was later solemnized in the Salt Lake Temple. He died in 1994.

Wilson held two Ph.D.s, one in French and music and the other in Arabic. At least one of these Ph.D.s was from the University of Utah. Over a 21-year period she taught a wide variety of courses including French, Greek, Italian, German, Music theory and cello at various times at Brigham Young University, the University of Utah and Utah State University.

Besides being the music editor for the Coptic Encyclopedia, Wilson also created a guide to the Library of Congress's collection of Coptic music. Since 1971, she has been closely connected with the work of the Leroy Robertson foundation which awards scholarships to young composers to aid them in furthering their education.

Wilson wrote a biography of her father entitled Leroy Robertson: Music Giant From the Rockies. It received the Association for Mormon Letters award for Best biography in 1997.

Wilson died on Monday, April 8, 2013 in Salt Lake City, Utah.

== Additional sources ==
- Howard, Rebecca C. (November 13, 2005). "2 honored for aiding the arts". Deseret Morning News.
- Howard, Rebecca C. (February 19, 2006). "Cellist to perform dad's concerto". Deseret Morning News.
- Neal A. Maxwell institute listing
- Marian Robertson Wilson papers listing
- Howard, Rebecca C. (May 21, 2005). "Scholar brings order to Coptic music recording". Deseret Morning News.
