= Dendō =

Graphic novel by Brittany Long Olsen

Dendō: One Year and One Half in Tokyo: A Missionary Memoir is a graphic novel missionary diary written by Brittany Long Olsen while she was a missionary for the Church of Jesus Christ of Latter-day Saints (LDS Church) in Japan. It is the first published missionary diary in graphic novel form, and won the Association for Mormon Letters (AML) award in 2015 for comics. After returning from her mission, she scanned and edited it, before self-publishing it after being rejected by traditional publishers. Dendō received good reviews, praising Olsen for her wit and spirituality. It was purchased and displayed by the L. Tom Perry Special Collections at Brigham Young University (BYU).

== History ==
Olsen drew in her journal every day on her 18-month mission to Japan. Olsen says that keeping a journal helped her cope with the "raw and emotional" moments. When she returned, she scanned all 600 pages, added shading, and replaced her handwriting with a font she made from her handwriting. After being rejected from traditional Mormon publishers as too niche, Olsen self-published through CreateSpace. The L. Tom Perry Special Collections at BYU purchased her original artwork for their 21st-century Mormon art collection, which was on display at their "Comics and Mormons" exhibit. Olson donates ten percent of the proceeds from CreateSpace sales to the LDS Church's missionary department.

== Criticism and awards ==
The graphic novel won the Association for Mormon Letters (AML) award for comics in 2015. AML called the book a "wonderful blending of the modern missionary narrative mixed with a traditional comic style, humor, and feel-good moments". Deseret book reviewer Jeff Peterson said the book was a "joy to read" for Olsen's "optimism, self-deprecating wit and ability to always find the spiritual silver lining". Theric Jepson at Dawning of a Brighter Day said that Dendō was thrilling because Olsen "captured the day-to-day drag that makes up the most exciting eighteen (or twenty-four) months in a young Mormon’s life".
