= Janet Kay Jensen =

American writer

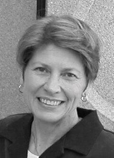
- Born: April 3, 1951 (age 75); Berkeley, California, U.S.
- Education: Utah State University (BS); Northwestern University (MA)
- Occupation: Author
- Spouse: Miles Jensen
- Website: janetjensen.com

Janet Kay Jensen is an American author. She was born April 3, 1951, in Berkeley, California. She earned the following degrees: B.S.Utah State University (Logan, Utah) and M.A. Northwestern University (Evanston, IL). Jensen resides in northern Utah.

Jensen's novel Don’t You Marry the Mormon Boys was awarded third prize at the 2004 Irreantum fiction contest by the Association for Mormon Letters.

Jensen's novel has grown to include an international audience. A feature article in an online Brisbane, Australia news link conducted an interview to discuss the book and current events.

== Publications ==
Novel

- Don’t You Marry the Mormon Boys (Bonneville Books, Cedar Fort Inc. 2007) ISBN 978-1-59955-075-6

Nonfiction

- (with Shaunda Kennedy Wenger) The Book Lover’s Cookbook: Recipes Inspired by Celebrated Works of Literature and the Passages that Feature Them (Wenger & Jensen, Ballantine Books, 2003) ISBN 0-345-46546-6

Contributing author

- Writing Secrets: A Comprehensive Guide to Writing Fiction & Nonfiction in the LDS Market (LDStorymakers 2005)
- The Magic of Stories: Literature-Based Language Intervention (Strong & North, Thinking Publications 1996)
- "Voice Male: Careers by Day, A Cappella by Night". Meridian Magazine. Archived from the original on 2007-06-08.
