= Adam S. Miller =

American academic

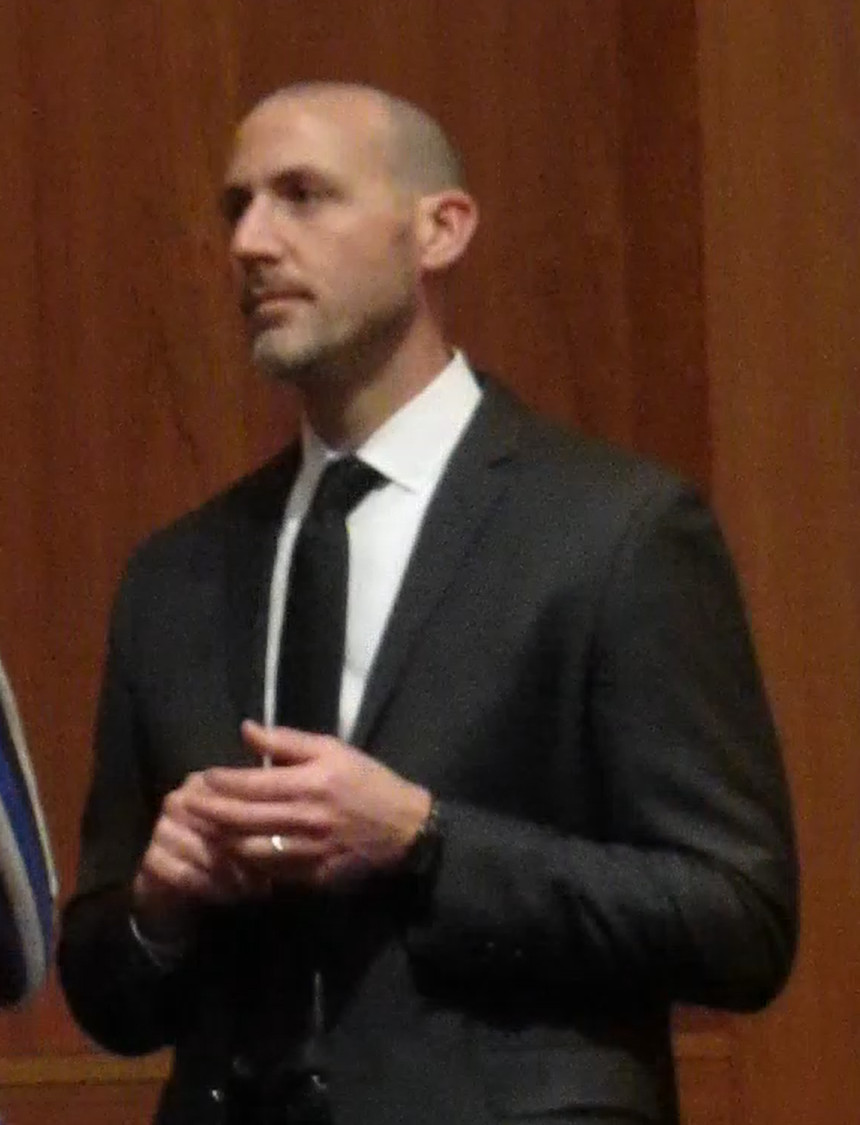
- Adam S. Miller in 2018
- Education: Brigham Young University; Villanova University (MA, PhD)
- Occupation: Associate professor at Collin College
- Known for: LDS lay theologian Founder of various LDS religious studies venues
- Awards: 2011 "best essayist"; 2016 non-fiction book finalist, Association for Mormon Letters; 2018 religious nonfiction award winner, Association for Mormon Letters;
- Website: AdamSMiller.net

Adam S. Miller is an American author of religious criticism and interpretation, with a focus on contemporary Latter-day Saint lay theology. Miller is also a professor of philosophy at Collin College in McKinney, Texas, where he directs the college's honors program.

Miller's work offers fresh interpretation on topics such as Christ's atonement, the appropriate relationship of faith and scholarship, and the nature of Latter-day Saint testimony. Miller co-founded Salt Press, a publisher of Mormon studies sold to BYU's Maxwell Institute, and also founded and serves as co-director of the annual colloquia, the Mormon Theology Seminar.

== Books ==
Authored

- An Early Resurrection: life in Christ Before You Die Paperback. 2018.
- The Sun Has Burned My Skin: A Modest Paraphrase of Solomon's Song of Songs. 2017.
- Future Mormon: Essays in Mormon Theology. 2016.
- Emma Mason; Mark Knight, eds. (2016). The Gospel According to David Foster Wallace: Boredom and Addiction in an Age of Distraction. New Directions in Religion and Literature.
- Nothing New Under the Sun: A Blunt Paraphrase of Ecclesiastes. 2016.
- Grace is Not God's Backup Plan: An Urgent Paraphrase of Paul's Letter to the Roman. 2015.
- Letters to a Young Mormon. 2014.
- Speculative Grace: Bruno Latour and Object-Oriented Theology. Perspectives in Continental Philosophy. 2013.
- Rube Goldberg Machines: Essays in Mormon Theology. 2012.
- Badiou, Marion, and St. Paul: Immanent Grace. Continuum Studies in Continental Philosophy. 2008.

=== Edited ===
- A Dream, a Rock, and a Pillar of Fire: Reading 1 Nephi 1. 2017.
- Fleeing the Garden: Reading Genesis 2-3. 2017.
- An Experiment on the Word: Reading Alma 32. 2011.
