= Eric D. Huntsman =

American academic

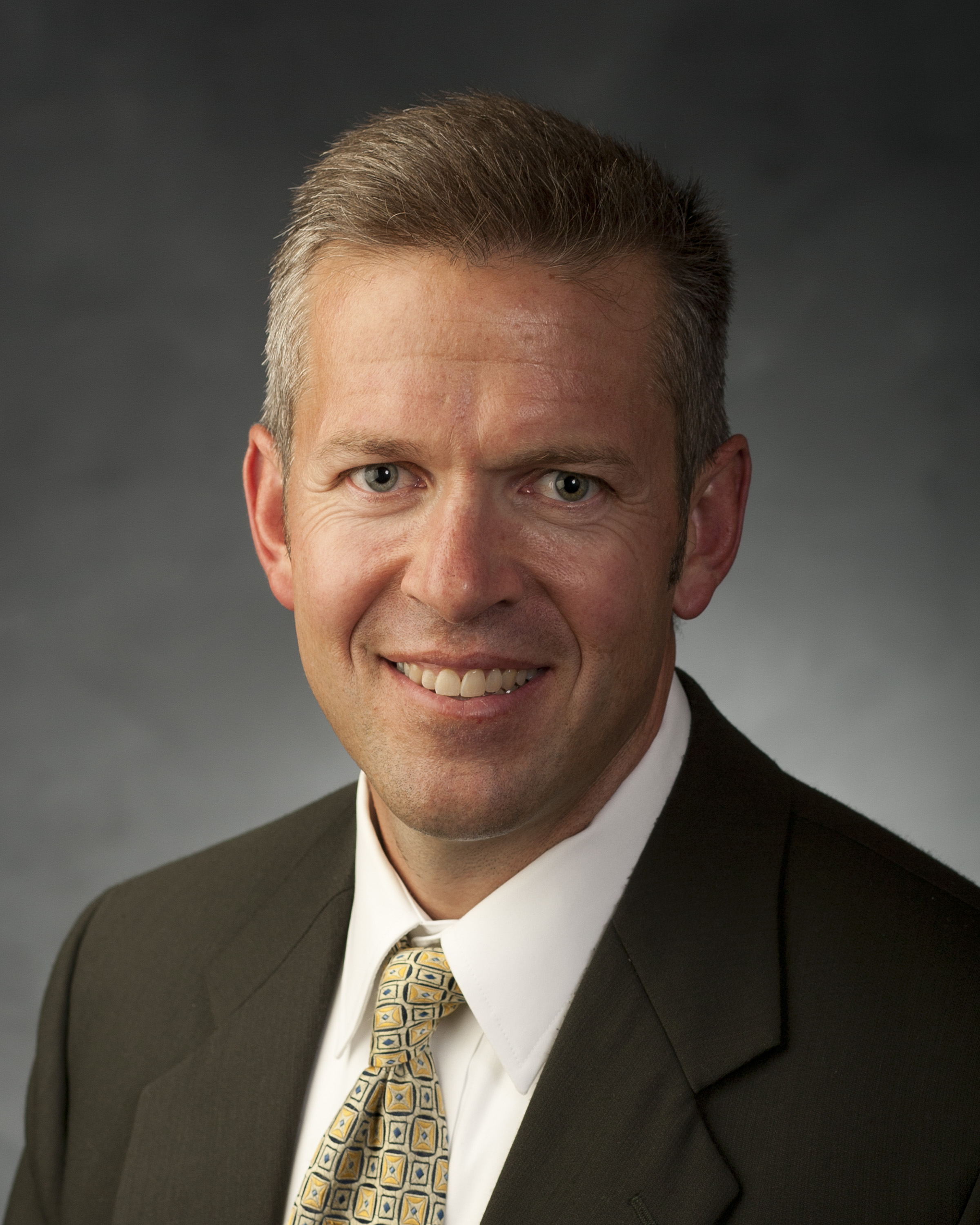
Eric Huntsman is a BYU faculty member and author.

Eric Dennis Huntsman is a religion professor at Brigham Young University (BYU) and was coordinator of the university's ancient near eastern studies program from 2012-2022. He is currently the academic director of the BYU Jerusalem Center

== Early life, education and personal life ==
Huntsman was born in Albuquerque, New Mexico, and raised in New York, Pennsylvania and Tennessee. Huntsman served as a missionary for the Church of Jesus Christ of Latter-day Saints (LDS Church) in Thailand. He graduated from BYU with a BA in Classical Greek and Latin in 1990. He then earned an MA and a Ph.D. from the University of Pennsylvania. In 1993, he married N. Elaine Scott. They are the parents of two children.

== Career ==
Huntsman joined the BYU faculty in 1994 as an instructor in classics. In 1997, after completing a Ph.D., he became an assistant professor in Ancient History and Classics. In 2003, Huntsman transferred departments to be a member of the Department of Ancient Scripture in BYU's College of Religious Education. In 2008, Huntsman moved to the rank of associate professor. In 2012, he began serving as the coordinator of BYU's Ancient Near Eastern Studies Program, and in 2015 he was promoted to full professor.

== Publications and media ==
Huntsman was among the contributors to the documentary Messiah: Behold the Lamb of God. He was a co-author of Jesus Christ and the World of the New Testament: An Illustrated Guide for Latter-day Saints along with Richard N. Holzapfel and Thomas A. Wayment, he also contributed a number of chapters to their series The Life and Teachings of Jesus Christ. Huntsman also wrote “Levels of Meaning: The Ara Pacis Augustae and the Teaching of Roman History,” which was published in the journal Interdisciplinary Humanities Vol. 15, Issue 1 (Spring 1998), p. 62–76. His article "Livia Before Octavian" was published in the journal Ancient Society in 2009. In addition his article And the Word was Made Flesh: An LDS Exegesis of the Blood and Water imagery in John was published by the journal Studies in the Bible and Antiquity in 2009 (pages 51–65).

Huntsman's study of the Passion Narratives entitled God So Loved the World: The Final Days of The Savior's Life was published in 2011. A companion volume on the Infancy Narratives, Good Tidings of Great Joy: An Advent Celebration of the Savior's Birth, was released in the fall of 2011. He assisted S. Kent Brown with his commentary on the Gospel of Luke and in August 2014 released The Miracles of Jesus with Deseret Book.

In early 2023, he and Trevan G. Hatch released Greater Love Hath No Man: A Latter-day Saint Guide to Celebrating the Easter Season. He and Deidre Nicole Green have co-edited and contributed to a volume with the University of Illinois Press entitled Latter-day Saint Perspective on Atonement, scheduled to be released in January 2024.

== Organisational affiliation ==
Huntsman is a member of the Society of Biblical Literature and the Association of Ancient Historians.

Huntsman has been a member of The Tabernacle Choir at Temple Square.

From 1996 to 2002, he served in the LDS Church as a bishop of a local congregation (ward) in Provo.

== Bibliography ==
- With Frank Judd and Shon Hopkins, The Ministry of Peter The Cief Apostle: 43rd Annual Spencer D. Sperry Symposium (2014)
- The Miracles of Jesus, Salt Lake City: Deseret Book, 2014.
- Good Tidings of Great Joy: An Advent Celebration of the Savior's Life. Salt Lake City: Deseret Book, 2011.
- God So Loved the World: The Final Days of the Savior's Life. Salt Lake City: Deseret Book, 2011.
- "The Roman World outside of Judea," pages 97–116 in The Life and Teachings of the New Testament Apostles: From the Day of Pentecost to the Apocalypse. Edited by Richard Neitzel Holzapfel and Thomas A. Wayment. Salt Lake City: Deseret Book, 2010.
- “The Impact of Gentile Conversions in the Greco-Roman World,” pages 80–96 in The Life and Teachings of the New Testament Apostles: From the Day of Pentecost to the Apocalypse. Edited by Richard Neitzel Holzapfel and Thomas A. Wayment. Salt Lake City: Deseret Book, 2010.
- “Imperial Cult and the Beasts of Revelation,” with Cecilia M. Peek, pages 221–249 in The Life and Teachings of the New Testament Apostles: From the Day of Pentecost to the Apocalypse. Edited by Richard Neitzel Holzapfel and Thomas A. Wayment. Salt Lake City: Deseret Book, 2010.
- “The Six Antitheses: Attaining the Purpose of the Law,” pages 93–109 in The Sermon on the Mount in Latter-day Scripture. Edited by Gaye Strathearn, Thomas A. Wayment, and Daniel L. Belnap. The 39th Annual Brigham Young University Sidney B. Sperry Symposium. Salt Lake City: Deseret Book, 2010.
- "Glad Tidings of Great Joy", Ensign, Dec. 2010, 52–57.
- “Livia Before Octavian,” Ancient Society 39 (2009), 121–169.
- “And the Word Was Made Flesh: An LDS Exegesis of the Blood and Water Imagery in John,” Studies in the Bible and Antiquity 1 (2009), 51–65.
- ""Reflections on the Savior's Last Week"," Ensign (April 2009), 52–60.
- "Your Faith Should Not Stand in the Wisdom of Men. Greek Philosophy, Corinthian Behavior, and the Teachings of Paul," pages 67–97 in The New Testament Brought to Light: Latter-day Saint Insights into Acts through Revelation. Edited by Ray L. Huntington, David M. Whitchurch, and Frank F. Judd, Jr. Provo, Utah: Religious Studies Center, 2009.
- Review of Karen Armstrong, The Great Transformation: The Beginning of Our Religious Traditions. BYU Studies 47.2 (2008), 142-47.
- "The Lamb of God: Unique Aspects of the Passion Narrative in John," pages 49–70 in Behold the Lamb of God: The Fourth Annual BYU Religious Education Easter Conference. Edited by Richard Neitzel Holzapfel, Frank F. Judd, Jr., and Thomas A. Wayment. Provo, Utah: Religious Studies Center, 2008.
- “The Bread of Life Sermon,” pages 87–112 in Celebrating Easter. Edited by Thomas A. Wayment and Keith J. Wilson. The 2006 BYU Easter Conference. Provo, Utah: Religious Studies Center, 2007. Substantial revision of “The Bread of Life Sermon,” 2006, below.
- Jesus Christ and the World of the New Testament: An Illustrated Reference for Latter-day Saints, with Richard Neitzel Holzapfel and Thomas A. Wayment. Salt Lake City: Deseret Book, September 2006.
- "The Occasional Nature, Composition, and Structure of the Pauline Epistles," Pages 190-207 in How The New Testament Came to Be. Edited by Kent P. Jackson et al. The 35th Annual Brigham Young University Sidney B. Sperry Symposium. Salt Lake City: Deseret Book, 2006.
- "The Bread of Life Sermon" in From the Transfiguration through the Triumphal Entry, edited by Richard N. Holzapfel and Thomas A. Wayment. The Life and Teachings of Jesus Christ, vol. 2. Salt Lake City: Deseret Book, March 2006. Presentation at the 2006 Easter Conference, BYU.; revised, pages 87–112 in Celebrating Easter. Edited by Thomas A. Wayment and Richard Neitzel Holzapfel. Provo: Religious Studies Center, 2006.
- "Teaching through Exegesis: Helping Students Ask Questions of the Text," Religious Educator 6.1 (Winter 2005).
- "Galilee and the Call of the Apostles," in From Bethlehem to the Sermon on the Mount, edited by Richard N. Holzapfel and Thomas A. Wayment. The Life and Teachings of Jesus Christ, vol. 1. Salt Lake City: Deseret Book, 2005.
- "Mary Magdalene: Biblical Enigma," Original presentation: February 25, 2004 as part of the Museum of Art lecture series Mystery, Metaphor, and Meaning: LDS Perspectives on The Da Vinci Code; Revised presentation: May 26, 2004, KBYU Studios; electronically published by Meridian Magazine, June 14–15, 2004.
- "Christ Before the Romans," in From the Last Supper Through the Resurrection: The Savior's Final Hours, edited by Richard N. Holzapfel and Thomas A. Wayment. The Life and Teachings of Jesus Christ, vol. 3. Salt Lake City: Deseret Book, 2003.
- "Levels of Meaning: The Ara Pacis Augustae and the Teaching of Roman History," Interdisciplinary Humanities 15.1 (Spring 1998), 62-76.
- "The Reliability of Josephus: Can He Be Trusted?," Masada and the World of the New Testament. BYU Studies 36.3 (1996-7) 392-402.
- "And They Cast Lots: Divination, Democracy, and Josephus," Masada and the World of the New Testament. BYU Studies 36.3 (1996-7) 365-377.
- "The Family and Property of Livia Drusilla." PhD Dissertation, University of Pennsylvania, 1997.
