= Matt Page (artist) =

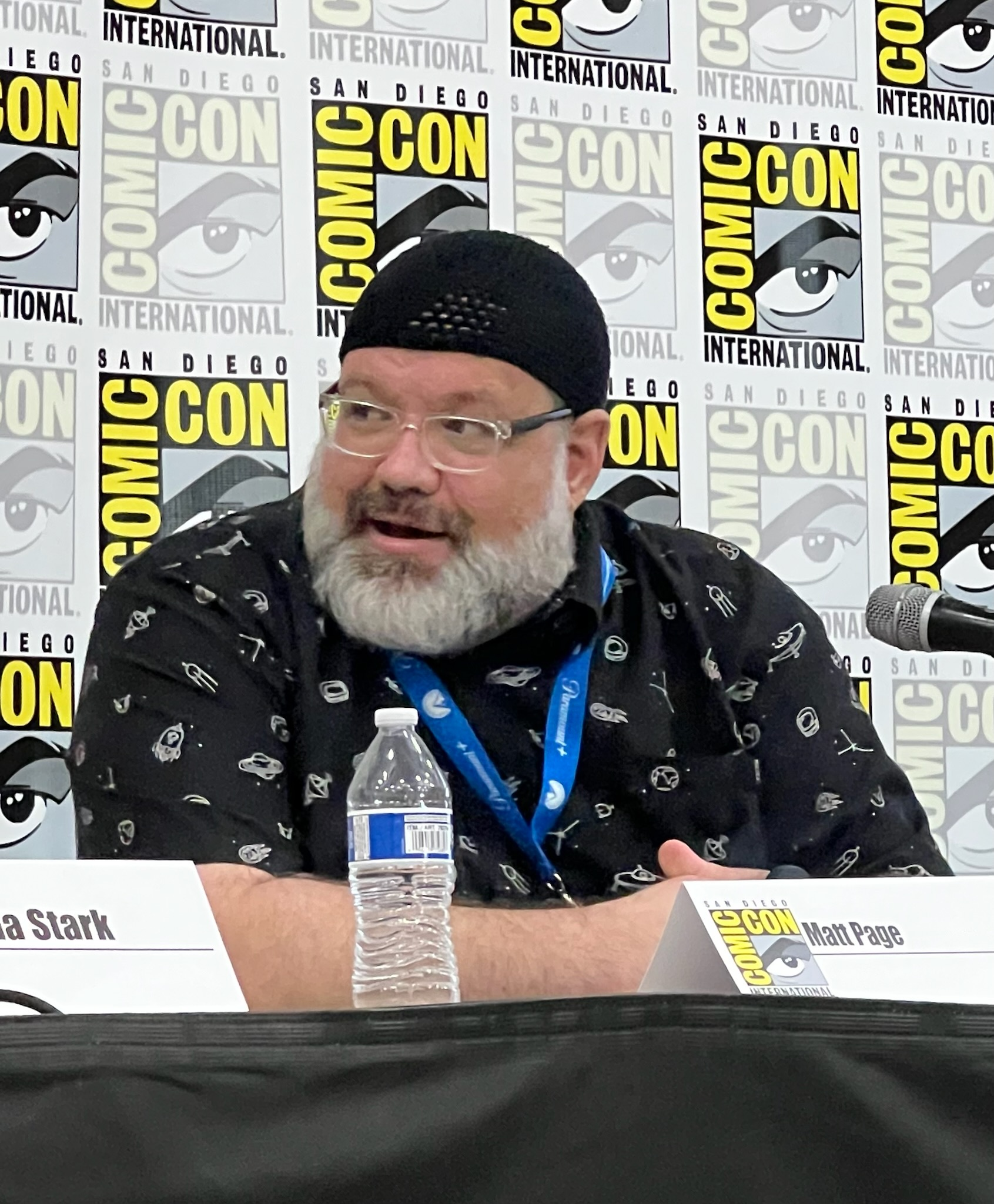
- Born: 1979 (age 46–47); United States
- Known for: Graphic design, Satire
- Website: mattpagedotcom.com

Matt Page (born 1979) is an American graphic artist living in Farmington, Utah. He is a member of the Church of Jesus Christ of Latter-day Saints (LDS Church) and is known for his satirical LDS Church comics and image manipulations.

== Education and work ==
Page studied art at Salt Lake Community College and the University of Utah.

Page's work is often satirical. He once had a popular blog dedicated to images of Axl Rose eating a snack photoshopped into historic images. From 2010–2013, he regularly contributed satirical images for By Common Consent's Illuminated Matsby feature. His artwork was displayed in an exhibition entitled "Mormon on the Arts" in the L. Tom Perry Special Collections at Brigham Young University in July 2017. The collection showcased images that combined Mormon cultural icons and popular culture. His sketchbook is held in the L. Tom Perry Special Collections. Page says that other Mormons sometimes react defensively to his art, but he maintains that he is poking fun at the faith in a light-hearted way.

In addition to image manipulation, Page also designs and illustrates images professionally. He designed the covers for A Short Stay in Hell by Steven L. Peck and Book of Mormon Girl by Joanna Brooks, among others. In 2015, he worked for a crafting and scrapbooking company. He illustrated a children's book called B is for Brains: ABCs for the Zombie Apocalypse. His Future-Day Saints comic won the 2020 comic award from the Association for Mormon Letters.

== Personal life ==
Page served an LDS Church mission in Johannesburg, South Africa, from 1998 to 2000. He met his wife at a meeting of the Genesis Group, and they were married in August 2001. As of 2011, they had three children.

== Awards ==
- Utah 2014 American Advertising Awards Show
