= Tim Slover =

American dramatist

- Education: Brigham Young University; University of Michigan (MA, PhD)
- Occupations: Playwright; professor

Tim Slover is an American playwright and professor of theatre studies at the University of Utah.

Slover has a bachelor's degree in English from Brigham Young University and an M.A. and Ph.D. from the University of Michigan.

Besides widely performed plays, Slover also wrote the script for A More Perfect Union. His play "A March Tale" won the Association for Mormon Letters Award for Drama in 1995. Among his many plays is God's Fisherman a play about Wilford Woodruff. His work Joyful Noise about George Handel composing the Messiah, was first performed in 1998 at BYU and later by the Lamb's Players Theatre in San Diego, California.

He left BYU to teach at Utah Valley University in the mid-1990s, and then at the University of Utah in 1999.

Slover also wrote the script for the film Minerva Teichert: A Mission in Paint.

Slover also wrote the book The Christmas Chronicles: The Legend of Santa Claus.

Slover's play "Virtue" about Hildegard of Bingen received its world premiere at Plan-B Theatre Company in February 2017.

Slover is a Latter-day Saint.
