= Variant =

Variant may refer to:

== Arts and entertainment ==
- Variant (magazine), a former British cultural magazine
- Variant cover, an issue of comic books with varying cover art
- Variant (novel), a novel by Robison Wells
- "Variant" (The Walking Dead), a 2022 television episode
- "The Variant", 2021 episode of the TV series Loki
  - Sylvie (Marvel Cinematic Universe), a character who was originally referred to as the Variant
  - "Variant", a fictional term in the Marvel Cinematic Universe pertaining to the multiverse

== Gaming ==
- Chess variant, a game derived from, related to or similar to chess in at least one respect
- List of poker variants
- List of Tetris variants

== Mathematics and computing ==
- Loop variant, a decreasing value ensuring that a loop in a computer programme terminates
- Variant (logic), a term or formula obtained from another one by consistently renaming all variables
- Variant symlinks, a symbolic link to a file that has a variable name embedded in it
- Variant type, in programming languages
- Z-variant, unicode characters that share the same etymology but have slightly different appearances

=== Computer security ===
- In network security, varieties of computer worms are called variants.

== Biology ==
- Allele, a variant of a gene
- In microbiology and virology, a variant, or 'genetic variant' is a subtype of a known microorganism.

== Vehicles ==
- Volkswagen Variant, an air-cooled station wagon produced until the early 1980s
- TeST TST-5 Variant, a Czech aircraft design of the 1990s

== Other uses ==
- Variant name (geography), a name for a geographic feature that is not in primary use
- Variant Chinese character, Chinese characters that can be used interchangeably
- Orthographical variant, a variant spelling of a botanical name
- Varyant, a road in İzmir, Turkey
- In an invitation to tender, a supplier response which in part offers a solution different from that specified by the buyer

== See also ==
- Variety (disambiguation)
- Variation (disambiguation)
- Change (disambiguation)
- Variations on a Theme (disambiguation)
- Rate of change (disambiguation)
- Repetition (disambiguation)
- Variability (disambiguation)
- Variance
