= Variety =

Variety may refer to:

== Arts and entertainment ==
=== Entertainment formats ===
- Variety (radio)
- Variety show, in theater and television

=== Films ===
- Variety (1925 film), a German silent film directed by Ewald Andre Dupont
- Variety (1935 film), a British musical film
- Variety (1935 German film), a German drama film
- Variety (1971 film), a Spanish drama film
- Variety (1983 film), an American independent film

=== Music ===
- Variety (Family Fodder album), tenth studio album by Family fodder
- Variety (Les Rita Mitsouko album), seventh studio album by Les Rita Mitsouko
- Variety (Mariya Takeuchi album), sixth studio album by Mariya Takeuchi
- Variety, a 2015 EP by Mrs. Green Apple
- Variety (Tokyo Jihen album), third studio album by Tokyo Jihen
- Variety Records, a short-lived US record label that was produced by Brunswick Records

=== Other uses in arts and entertainment ===
- Variety (magazine), an entertainment industry newspaper
  - Variety Film Reviews is the 24-volume hardcover reprint of the magazine feature film reviews
- Variety Television Network, an American former digital subchannel
- "Variety", a 2002 Oz television episode

== Botany and horticulture ==
- Variety (botany), a formal rank, in taxonomic nomenclature, below subspecies
- Colloquially (and historically):
  - Cultivar, especially of grapes and rice
  - Hybrid (biology), more generally
  - Any form (botany) (a taxonomic rank below variety)
- Plant variety (law), a non-taxonomic term of legal recognition

== Businesses and organizations ==
- Variety, the Children's Charity, international charity to help children with disabilities
- Variety Cruises, a cruise line
- Variety (magazine), an entertainment industry newspaper
- Variety Wholesalers, a retail store owner operating in the southeastern United States

== Mathematics and systems ==
- Algebraic variety, the set of solutions of a system of polynomial equations
- Variety (cybernetics), the number of possible states of a system or of an element of the system
- Variety (universal algebra), classes of algebraic structures defined by equations in universal algebra

== Other uses ==
- Variety (linguistics), a specific form of a language (or of a dialect continuum)
- Variety, a term in coin collecting
- Variety Jones, pseudonym of a person closely involved with the founding of the darknet market Silk Road

== See also ==
- Variability (disambiguation)
- Variant (disambiguation)
- Variation (disambiguation)
- Unity in variety
