= Variations for Orchestra =

Variations for Orchestra may refer to:

- an orchestral piece consisting of a set of variations, usually on a theme;
  - Variations for Orchestra (1904) by Arnold Bax
  - Variations for Orchestra, Op. 31 (1926–28) by Arnold Schoenberg
  - Variations for Orchestra, Op. 30 (1940) by Anton Webern
  - Variations for Orchestra (1954) by Luigi Dallapiccola
  - Variations for Orchestra (1954–55) by Elliott Carter
  - Variations for Orchestra (1956) by Henry Cowell
  - Orchestral Variations (Copland) (1957) by Aaron Copland
  - Variations for Orchestra (1957/1960) by Ralph Vaughan Williams (originally composed as Variations for Brass Band and transcribed by Gordon Jacob)
  - Variations: Aldous Huxley in memoriam (1963–64) by Igor Stravinsky
  - Variations for Orchestra (1966) by Leslie Bassett
  - Variations for Orchestra by Geoffrey Grey
- Variations for Orchestra, a ballet choreographed by George Balanchine to Stravinsky's 1964 composition

== See also ==
- Symphonic Variations (disambiguation)
- Variations on a Theme (disambiguation)
- Variation (music)
