= Variations on a Theme =

Variations on a Theme may refer to:

- Variations on a Theme of Frank Bridge
- Carmen Variations (Horowitz), subtitled "Variations on a Theme from Carmen"
- Variations on a Theme of Chopin (Mompou)
- Variations on a Theme of Chopin (Rachmaninoff)
- Variations on a Theme of Corelli
- Variations and Fugue on a Theme by Handel
- Variations on a Theme by Haydn
- Variations and Fugue on a Theme by Hiller
- Variations and Fugue on a Theme by Mozart
- Introduction and Variations on a Theme by Mozart (Sor)
- Variations and Fugue on a Theme of Purcell, subtitled The Young Person's Guide to the Orchestra
- Variations, Interlude and Finale on a Theme by Rameau
- Variations on a Theme by Tchaikovsky (Arensky)
- Variations on a Theme by William Carlos Williams, a poem by Kenneth Koch
- Variations on a Theme (Om album)
- Variations on a Theme (David Thomas album)
- Variations on a Theme Publishing
- Variation on a Theme (play), a 1958 work by the British writer Terence Rattigan

Variations may refer to:

- Orchestral Variations (Copland)
- Piano Variations (Copland)
- Variation on a Waltz by Diabelli (Liszt)
- Variations for Winds, Strings and Keyboards
- Enigma Variations, subtitled "Variations on an Original Theme for Orchestra"
- Variations for piano (Webern)
- Variations (Stravinsky)
  - Variations (ballet)
  - Variations for Orchestra (Balanchine)

== See also ==
- List of variations on a theme by another composer
- Variation (music)
- Variation (disambiguation)
- Variations for Orchestra (disambiguation)
- Symphonic Variations (disambiguation)
