= Repeater (disambiguation) =

A repeater is a telecommunications device that receives a signal and retransmits it.

Repeater(s) may also refer to:

== Arts and entertainment ==
- Akete or repeater, a drum used in the Nyahbingi music of Jamaica
- Repeater (album) 1990 album and song by post-hardcore band Fugazi
- Repeater (band), a band from Long Beach, California
- Repeater (G.I. Joe), a fictional character in the G.I. Joe universe
- Repeater, a plant from the Plants vs. Zombies franchise
- Repeater Productions, an Australian film production company, producer of the 2025 documentary Iron Winter
- Repeaters, a 2010 Canadian film
- "Repeaters", a 2022 song by No Devotion from the album No Oblivion

== Weapons ==
- Repeater crossbow, a crossbow that combines bow spanning, bolt placing, and shooting into a single motion.
- Repeater (firearm), a firearm capable of repeated firing between each manual ammunition reload

== Technology ==
- Repeater (horology), complication in a mechanical clock that repeats chimes of the hour
- Repeater hub, an Ethernet network component

== Other uses ==
- Repeater (student), a student repeating a grade

== See also ==
- Repeat (disambiguation)
- Repetition (disambiguation)
