= Piano Variations =

Piano Variations is a set of variations for piano, possibly:

- Copland Piano Variations
- Variations for piano (Webern)
- List_of_compositions_by_Ludwig_van_Beethoven#Piano_variations
