= The Variations =

2023 novel by Patrick Langley

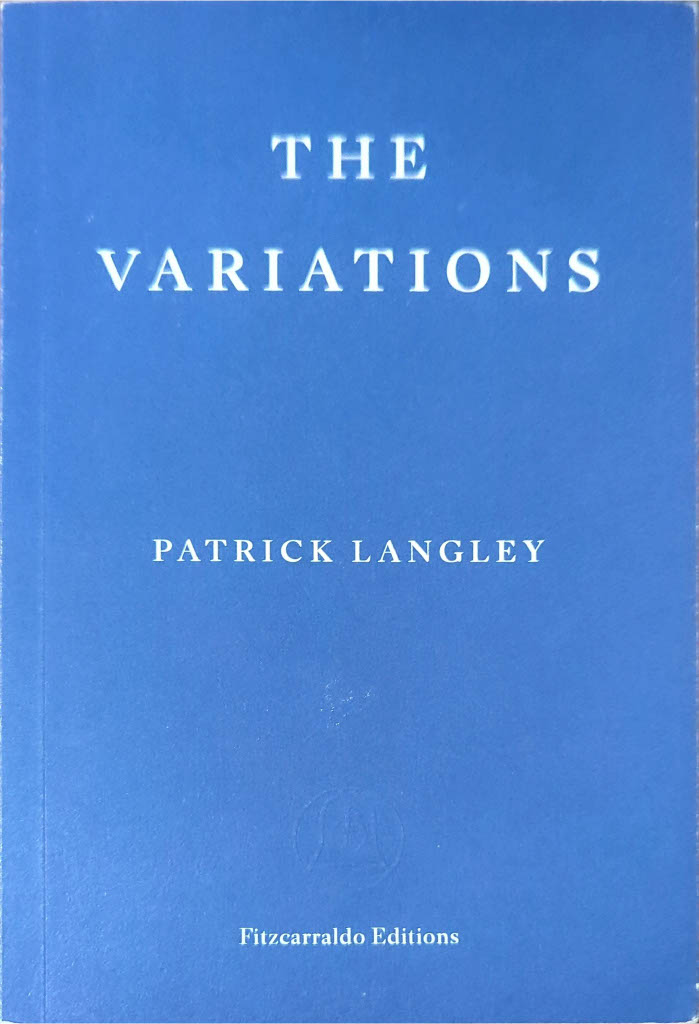
- Cover of first edition
- Author: Patrick Langley
- Language: English
- Publisher: Fitzcarraldo Editions
- Publication date: 2023
- Publication place: London
- Pages: 452 (first edition)
- ISBN: 978-1-80427-050-9

The Variations is a 2023 novel by Patrick Langley. This is the author's second novel, following his debut novel Arkady. The novel begins with the death of Cornish composer Selda Heddle. It is revealed that she possessed a power which allowed her to listen to the voices of long-dead people, and that this power has been passed on to her grandson, Wolf. The novel goes on to chronicle Wolf's struggles to adapt to this change of circumstance.

Upon its publication, a review in The Times Literary Supplement was somewhat critical, saying "while there is much discussion about music, the book itself rarely seems musical, much as it might wish to be". A contemporaneous review in The Guardian praised the book's "thrilling Nabokovian intrigue in the relationship between patterning, form and meaning".
