= Patrick Langley =

British novelist

Patrick Langley is a British writer living in London.

== Novels ==
- 2018: Arkady (London: Fitzcarraldo Editions). Longlisted for the RSL Ondaatje Prize and the Deborah Rogers Foundation Writers Award and reviewed in The Guardian, The Irish Times, New Statesman, and elsewhere.
- 2023/24: The Variations (London: Fitzcarraldo Editions; New York, NYRB) Reviewed in The Guardian the Times Literary Supplement and elsewhere.
