= Repeat =

Repeat may refer to:

- Rerun, a rebroadcast of an episode of a radio or television program
- Repeated sequence (DNA), a pattern of nucleic acid (DNA or RNA) that occurs in multiple copies throughout the genome
  - CRISPR
- Repeat instruction on a computer
- The smallest rectangle that can be tiled to form the whole pattern of a wallpaper

== Music ==
- "Repeat" (song), a 2011 song by David Guetta
- "Repeat", a 2021 song by Luke Hemmings from When Facing The Things We Turn Away From
- Repeat sign, in sheet music, notation that a section should be repeated
- Repeat Records, a British independent record label
- Repeat, a 1993 EP by This Heat
- Repeat – The Best of Jethro Tull – Vol II, a 1977 album

== See also ==
- Repetition (disambiguation)
- Repeater (disambiguation)
- Repeat It (disambiguation)
- Do while loop, a control statement in computer programing, sometimes called repeat until
