= CJK Unified Ideographs Extension C =

Unicode character block

- Range: U+2A700..U+2B73F (4,160 code points)
- Plane: SIP
- Scripts: Han
- Assigned: 4,160 code points
- Unused: 0 reserved code points

Unicode Version History
- 5.2 (2009): 4,149 (+4,149)
- 14.0 (2021): 4,153 (+4)
- 15.0 (2022): 4,154 (+1)
- 17.0 (2025): 4,160 (+6)

Unicode documentation
- Code chart ∣ Web page

CJK Unified Ideographs Extension C is a Unicode block containing rare and historic CJK ideographs for Chinese, Japanese, Korean, and Vietnamese submitted to the Ideographic Research Group between 2002 and 2006, plus five "urgently needed" characters added in Unicode versions 14.0 and 15.0, some of which had previously been mistakenly unified with other characters.

The block has dozens of ideographic variation sequences registered in the Unicode Ideographic Variation Database (IVD). These sequences specify the desired glyph variant for a given Unicode character.

Note that the Katakana ligature 𪜈 (U+2A708) has been erroneously encoded in this block as a Han character.

== Block ==
CJK Unified Ideographs Extension C^{[1]} Official Unicode Consortium code chart (PDF)
	0	1	2	3	4	5	6	7	8	9	A	B	C	D	E	F
U+2A70x	𪜀	𪜁	𪜂	𪜃	𪜄	𪜅	𪜆	𪜇	𪜈	𪜉	𪜊	𪜋	𪜌	𪜍	𪜎	𪜏
U+2A71x	𪜐	𪜑	𪜒	𪜓	𪜔	𪜕	𪜖	𪜗	𪜘	𪜙	𪜚	𪜛	𪜜	𪜝	𪜞	𪜟
U+2A72x	𪜠	𪜡	𪜢	𪜣	𪜤	𪜥	𪜦	𪜧	𪜨	𪜩	𪜪	𪜫	𪜬	𪜭	𪜮	𪜯
U+2A73x	𪜰	𪜱	𪜲	𪜳	𪜴	𪜵	𪜶	𪜷	𪜸	𪜹	𪜺	𪜻	𪜼	𪜽	𪜾	𪜿
U+2A74x	𪝀	𪝁	𪝂	𪝃	𪝄	𪝅	𪝆	𪝇	𪝈	𪝉	𪝊	𪝋	𪝌	𪝍	𪝎	𪝏
U+2A75x	𪝐	𪝑	𪝒	𪝓	𪝔	𪝕	𪝖	𪝗	𪝘	𪝙	𪝚	𪝛	𪝜	𪝝	𪝞	𪝟
U+2A76x	𪝠	𪝡	𪝢	𪝣	𪝤	𪝥	𪝦	𪝧	𪝨	𪝩	𪝪	𪝫	𪝬	𪝭	𪝮	𪝯
U+2A77x	𪝰	𪝱	𪝲	𪝳	𪝴	𪝵	𪝶	𪝷	𪝸	𪝹	𪝺	𪝻	𪝼	𪝽	𪝾	𪝿
U+2A78x	𪞀	𪞁	𪞂	𪞃	𪞄	𪞅	𪞆	𪞇	𪞈	𪞉	𪞊	𪞋	𪞌	𪞍	𪞎	𪞏
U+2A79x	𪞐	𪞑	𪞒	𪞓	𪞔	𪞕	𪞖	𪞗	𪞘	𪞙	𪞚	𪞛	𪞜	𪞝	𪞞	𪞟
U+2A7Ax	𪞠	𪞡	𪞢	𪞣	𪞤	𪞥	𪞦	𪞧	𪞨	𪞩	𪞪	𪞫	𪞬	𪞭	𪞮	𪞯
U+2A7Bx	𪞰	𪞱	𪞲	𪞳	𪞴	𪞵	𪞶	𪞷	𪞸	𪞹	𪞺	𪞻	𪞼	𪞽	𪞾	𪞿
U+2A7Cx	𪟀	𪟁	𪟂	𪟃	𪟄	𪟅	𪟆	𪟇	𪟈	𪟉	𪟊	𪟋	𪟌	𪟍	𪟎	𪟏
U+2A7Dx	𪟐	𪟑	𪟒	𪟓	𪟔	𪟕	𪟖	𪟗	𪟘	𪟙	𪟚	𪟛	𪟜	𪟝	𪟞	𪟟
U+2A7Ex	𪟠	𪟡	𪟢	𪟣	𪟤	𪟥	𪟦	𪟧	𪟨	𪟩	𪟪	𪟫	𪟬	𪟭	𪟮	𪟯
U+2A7Fx	𪟰	𪟱	𪟲	𪟳	𪟴	𪟵	𪟶	𪟷	𪟸	𪟹	𪟺	𪟻	𪟼	𪟽	𪟾	𪟿
U+2A80x	𪠀	𪠁	𪠂	𪠃	𪠄	𪠅	𪠆	𪠇	𪠈	𪠉	𪠊	𪠋	𪠌	𪠍	𪠎	𪠏
U+2A81x	𪠐	𪠑	𪠒	𪠓	𪠔	𪠕	𪠖	𪠗	𪠘	𪠙	𪠚	𪠛	𪠜	𪠝	𪠞	𪠟
U+2A82x	𪠠	𪠡	𪠢	𪠣	𪠤	𪠥	𪠦	𪠧	𪠨	𪠩	𪠪	𪠫	𪠬	𪠭	𪠮	𪠯
U+2A83x	𪠰	𪠱	𪠲	𪠳	𪠴	𪠵	𪠶	𪠷	𪠸	𪠹	𪠺	𪠻	𪠼	𪠽	𪠾	𪠿
U+2A84x	𪡀	𪡁	𪡂	𪡃	𪡄	𪡅	𪡆	𪡇	𪡈	𪡉	𪡊	𪡋	𪡌	𪡍	𪡎	𪡏
U+2A85x	𪡐	𪡑	𪡒	𪡓	𪡔	𪡕	𪡖	𪡗	𪡘	𪡙	𪡚	𪡛	𪡜	𪡝	𪡞	𪡟
U+2A86x	𪡠	𪡡	𪡢	𪡣	𪡤	𪡥	𪡦	𪡧	𪡨	𪡩	𪡪	𪡫	𪡬	𪡭	𪡮	𪡯
U+2A87x	𪡰	𪡱	𪡲	𪡳	𪡴	𪡵	𪡶	𪡷	𪡸	𪡹	𪡺	𪡻	𪡼	𪡽	𪡾	𪡿
U+2A88x	𪢀	𪢁	𪢂	𪢃	𪢄	𪢅	𪢆	𪢇	𪢈	𪢉	𪢊	𪢋	𪢌	𪢍	𪢎	𪢏
U+2A89x	𪢐	𪢑	𪢒	𪢓	𪢔	𪢕	𪢖	𪢗	𪢘	𪢙	𪢚	𪢛	𪢜	𪢝	𪢞	𪢟
U+2A8Ax	𪢠	𪢡	𪢢	𪢣	𪢤	𪢥	𪢦	𪢧	𪢨	𪢩	𪢪	𪢫	𪢬	𪢭	𪢮	𪢯
U+2A8Bx	𪢰	𪢱	𪢲	𪢳	𪢴	𪢵	𪢶	𪢷	𪢸	𪢹	𪢺	𪢻	𪢼	𪢽	𪢾	𪢿
U+2A8Cx	𪣀	𪣁	𪣂	𪣃	𪣄	𪣅	𪣆	𪣇	𪣈	𪣉	𪣊	𪣋	𪣌	𪣍	𪣎	𪣏
U+2A8Dx	𪣐	𪣑	𪣒	𪣓	𪣔	𪣕	𪣖	𪣗	𪣘	𪣙	𪣚	𪣛	𪣜	𪣝	𪣞	𪣟
U+2A8Ex	𪣠	𪣡	𪣢	𪣣	𪣤	𪣥	𪣦	𪣧	𪣨	𪣩	𪣪	𪣫	𪣬	𪣭	𪣮	𪣯
U+2A8Fx	𪣰	𪣱	𪣲	𪣳	𪣴	𪣵	𪣶	𪣷	𪣸	𪣹	𪣺	𪣻	𪣼	𪣽	𪣾	𪣿
U+2A90x	𪤀	𪤁	𪤂	𪤃	𪤄	𪤅	𪤆	𪤇	𪤈	𪤉	𪤊	𪤋	𪤌	𪤍	𪤎	𪤏
U+2A91x	𪤐	𪤑	𪤒	𪤓	𪤔	𪤕	𪤖	𪤗	𪤘	𪤙	𪤚	𪤛	𪤜	𪤝	𪤞	𪤟
U+2A92x	𪤠	𪤡	𪤢	𪤣	𪤤	𪤥	𪤦	𪤧	𪤨	𪤩	𪤪	𪤫	𪤬	𪤭	𪤮	𪤯
U+2A93x	𪤰	𪤱	𪤲	𪤳	𪤴	𪤵	𪤶	𪤷	𪤸	𪤹	𪤺	𪤻	𪤼	𪤽	𪤾	𪤿
U+2A94x	𪥀	𪥁	𪥂	𪥃	𪥄	𪥅	𪥆	𪥇	𪥈	𪥉	𪥊	𪥋	𪥌	𪥍	𪥎	𪥏
U+2A95x	𪥐	𪥑	𪥒	𪥓	𪥔	𪥕	𪥖	𪥗	𪥘	𪥙	𪥚	𪥛	𪥜	𪥝	𪥞	𪥟
U+2A96x	𪥠	𪥡	𪥢	𪥣	𪥤	𪥥	𪥦	𪥧	𪥨	𪥩	𪥪	𪥫	𪥬	𪥭	𪥮	𪥯
U+2A97x	𪥰	𪥱	𪥲	𪥳	𪥴	𪥵	𪥶	𪥷	𪥸	𪥹	𪥺	𪥻	𪥼	𪥽	𪥾	𪥿
U+2A98x	𪦀	𪦁	𪦂	𪦃	𪦄	𪦅	𪦆	𪦇	𪦈	𪦉	𪦊	𪦋	𪦌	𪦍	𪦎	𪦏
U+2A99x	𪦐	𪦑	𪦒	𪦓	𪦔	𪦕	𪦖	𪦗	𪦘	𪦙	𪦚	𪦛	𪦜	𪦝	𪦞	𪦟
U+2A9Ax	𪦠	𪦡	𪦢	𪦣	𪦤	𪦥	𪦦	𪦧	𪦨	𪦩	𪦪	𪦫	𪦬	𪦭	𪦮	𪦯
U+2A9Bx	𪦰	𪦱	𪦲	𪦳	𪦴	𪦵	𪦶	𪦷	𪦸	𪦹	𪦺	𪦻	𪦼	𪦽	𪦾	𪦿
U+2A9Cx	𪧀	𪧁	𪧂	𪧃	𪧄	𪧅	𪧆	𪧇	𪧈	𪧉	𪧊	𪧋	𪧌	𪧍	𪧎	𪧏
U+2A9Dx	𪧐	𪧑	𪧒	𪧓	𪧔	𪧕	𪧖	𪧗	𪧘	𪧙	𪧚	𪧛	𪧜	𪧝	𪧞	𪧟
U+2A9Ex	𪧠	𪧡	𪧢	𪧣	𪧤	𪧥	𪧦	𪧧	𪧨	𪧩	𪧪	𪧫	𪧬	𪧭	𪧮	𪧯
U+2A9Fx	𪧰	𪧱	𪧲	𪧳	𪧴	𪧵	𪧶	𪧷	𪧸	𪧹	𪧺	𪧻	𪧼	𪧽	𪧾	𪧿
U+2AA0x	𪨀	𪨁	𪨂	𪨃	𪨄	𪨅	𪨆	𪨇	𪨈	𪨉	𪨊	𪨋	𪨌	𪨍	𪨎	𪨏
U+2AA1x	𪨐	𪨑	𪨒	𪨓	𪨔	𪨕	𪨖	𪨗	𪨘	𪨙	𪨚	𪨛	𪨜	𪨝	𪨞	𪨟
U+2AA2x	𪨠	𪨡	𪨢	𪨣	𪨤	𪨥	𪨦	𪨧	𪨨	𪨩	𪨪	𪨫	𪨬	𪨭	𪨮	𪨯
U+2AA3x	𪨰	𪨱	𪨲	𪨳	𪨴	𪨵	𪨶	𪨷	𪨸	𪨹	𪨺	𪨻	𪨼	𪨽	𪨾	𪨿
U+2AA4x	𪩀	𪩁	𪩂	𪩃	𪩄	𪩅	𪩆	𪩇	𪩈	𪩉	𪩊	𪩋	𪩌	𪩍	𪩎	𪩏
U+2AA5x	𪩐	𪩑	𪩒	𪩓	𪩔	𪩕	𪩖	𪩗	𪩘	𪩙	𪩚	𪩛	𪩜	𪩝	𪩞	𪩟
U+2AA6x	𪩠	𪩡	𪩢	𪩣	𪩤	𪩥	𪩦	𪩧	𪩨	𪩩	𪩪	𪩫	𪩬	𪩭	𪩮	𪩯
U+2AA7x	𪩰	𪩱	𪩲	𪩳	𪩴	𪩵	𪩶	𪩷	𪩸	𪩹	𪩺	𪩻	𪩼	𪩽	𪩾	𪩿
U+2AA8x	𪪀	𪪁	𪪂	𪪃	𪪄	𪪅	𪪆	𪪇	𪪈	𪪉	𪪊	𪪋	𪪌	𪪍	𪪎	𪪏
U+2AA9x	𪪐	𪪑	𪪒	𪪓	𪪔	𪪕	𪪖	𪪗	𪪘	𪪙	𪪚	𪪛	𪪜	𪪝	𪪞	𪪟
U+2AAAx	𪪠	𪪡	𪪢	𪪣	𪪤	𪪥	𪪦	𪪧	𪪨	𪪩	𪪪	𪪫	𪪬	𪪭	𪪮	𪪯
U+2AABx	𪪰	𪪱	𪪲	𪪳	𪪴	𪪵	𪪶	𪪷	𪪸	𪪹	𪪺	𪪻	𪪼	𪪽	𪪾	𪪿
U+2AACx	𪫀	𪫁	𪫂	𪫃	𪫄	𪫅	𪫆	𪫇	𪫈	𪫉	𪫊	𪫋	𪫌	𪫍	𪫎	𪫏
U+2AADx	𪫐	𪫑	𪫒	𪫓	𪫔	𪫕	𪫖	𪫗	𪫘	𪫙	𪫚	𪫛	𪫜	𪫝	𪫞	𪫟
U+2AAEx	𪫠	𪫡	𪫢	𪫣	𪫤	𪫥	𪫦	𪫧	𪫨	𪫩	𪫪	𪫫	𪫬	𪫭	𪫮	𪫯
U+2AAFx	𪫰	𪫱	𪫲	𪫳	𪫴	𪫵	𪫶	𪫷	𪫸	𪫹	𪫺	𪫻	𪫼	𪫽	𪫾	𪫿
U+2AB0x	𪬀	𪬁	𪬂	𪬃	𪬄	𪬅	𪬆	𪬇	𪬈	𪬉	𪬊	𪬋	𪬌	𪬍	𪬎	𪬏
U+2AB1x	𪬐	𪬑	𪬒	𪬓	𪬔	𪬕	𪬖	𪬗	𪬘	𪬙	𪬚	𪬛	𪬜	𪬝	𪬞	𪬟
U+2AB2x	𪬠	𪬡	𪬢	𪬣	𪬤	𪬥	𪬦	𪬧	𪬨	𪬩	𪬪	𪬫	𪬬	𪬭	𪬮	𪬯
U+2AB3x	𪬰	𪬱	𪬲	𪬳	𪬴	𪬵	𪬶	𪬷	𪬸	𪬹	𪬺	𪬻	𪬼	𪬽	𪬾	𪬿
U+2AB4x	𪭀	𪭁	𪭂	𪭃	𪭄	𪭅	𪭆	𪭇	𪭈	𪭉	𪭊	𪭋	𪭌	𪭍	𪭎	𪭏
U+2AB5x	𪭐	𪭑	𪭒	𪭓	𪭔	𪭕	𪭖	𪭗	𪭘	𪭙	𪭚	𪭛	𪭜	𪭝	𪭞	𪭟
U+2AB6x	𪭠	𪭡	𪭢	𪭣	𪭤	𪭥	𪭦	𪭧	𪭨	𪭩	𪭪	𪭫	𪭬	𪭭	𪭮	𪭯
U+2AB7x	𪭰	𪭱	𪭲	𪭳	𪭴	𪭵	𪭶	𪭷	𪭸	𪭹	𪭺	𪭻	𪭼	𪭽	𪭾	𪭿
U+2AB8x	𪮀	𪮁	𪮂	𪮃	𪮄	𪮅	𪮆	𪮇	𪮈	𪮉	𪮊	𪮋	𪮌	𪮍	𪮎	𪮏
U+2AB9x	𪮐	𪮑	𪮒	𪮓	𪮔	𪮕	𪮖	𪮗	𪮘	𪮙	𪮚	𪮛	𪮜	𪮝	𪮞	𪮟
U+2ABAx	𪮠	𪮡	𪮢	𪮣	𪮤	𪮥	𪮦	𪮧	𪮨	𪮩	𪮪	𪮫	𪮬	𪮭	𪮮	𪮯
U+2ABBx	𪮰	𪮱	𪮲	𪮳	𪮴	𪮵	𪮶	𪮷	𪮸	𪮹	𪮺	𪮻	𪮼	𪮽	𪮾	𪮿
U+2ABCx	𪯀	𪯁	𪯂	𪯃	𪯄	𪯅	𪯆	𪯇	𪯈	𪯉	𪯊	𪯋	𪯌	𪯍	𪯎	𪯏
U+2ABDx	𪯐	𪯑	𪯒	𪯓	𪯔	𪯕	𪯖	𪯗	𪯘	𪯙	𪯚	𪯛	𪯜	𪯝	𪯞	𪯟
U+2ABEx	𪯠	𪯡	𪯢	𪯣	𪯤	𪯥	𪯦	𪯧	𪯨	𪯩	𪯪	𪯫	𪯬	𪯭	𪯮	𪯯
U+2ABFx	𪯰	𪯱	𪯲	𪯳	𪯴	𪯵	𪯶	𪯷	𪯸	𪯹	𪯺	𪯻	𪯼	𪯽	𪯾	𪯿
U+2AC0x	𪰀	𪰁	𪰂	𪰃	𪰄	𪰅	𪰆	𪰇	𪰈	𪰉	𪰊	𪰋	𪰌	𪰍	𪰎	𪰏
U+2AC1x	𪰐	𪰑	𪰒	𪰓	𪰔	𪰕	𪰖	𪰗	𪰘	𪰙	𪰚	𪰛	𪰜	𪰝	𪰞	𪰟
U+2AC2x	𪰠	𪰡	𪰢	𪰣	𪰤	𪰥	𪰦	𪰧	𪰨	𪰩	𪰪	𪰫	𪰬	𪰭	𪰮	𪰯
U+2AC3x	𪰰	𪰱	𪰲	𪰳	𪰴	𪰵	𪰶	𪰷	𪰸	𪰹	𪰺	𪰻	𪰼	𪰽	𪰾	𪰿
U+2AC4x	𪱀	𪱁	𪱂	𪱃	𪱄	𪱅	𪱆	𪱇	𪱈	𪱉	𪱊	𪱋	𪱌	𪱍	𪱎	𪱏
U+2AC5x	𪱐	𪱑	𪱒	𪱓	𪱔	𪱕	𪱖	𪱗	𪱘	𪱙	𪱚	𪱛	𪱜	𪱝	𪱞	𪱟
U+2AC6x	𪱠	𪱡	𪱢	𪱣	𪱤	𪱥	𪱦	𪱧	𪱨	𪱩	𪱪	𪱫	𪱬	𪱭	𪱮	𪱯
U+2AC7x	𪱰	𪱱	𪱲	𪱳	𪱴	𪱵	𪱶	𪱷	𪱸	𪱹	𪱺	𪱻	𪱼	𪱽	𪱾	𪱿
U+2AC8x	𪲀	𪲁	𪲂	𪲃	𪲄	𪲅	𪲆	𪲇	𪲈	𪲉	𪲊	𪲋	𪲌	𪲍	𪲎	𪲏
U+2AC9x	𪲐	𪲑	𪲒	𪲓	𪲔	𪲕	𪲖	𪲗	𪲘	𪲙	𪲚	𪲛	𪲜	𪲝	𪲞	𪲟
U+2ACAx	𪲠	𪲡	𪲢	𪲣	𪲤	𪲥	𪲦	𪲧	𪲨	𪲩	𪲪	𪲫	𪲬	𪲭	𪲮	𪲯
U+2ACBx	𪲰	𪲱	𪲲	𪲳	𪲴	𪲵	𪲶	𪲷	𪲸	𪲹	𪲺	𪲻	𪲼	𪲽	𪲾	𪲿
U+2ACCx	𪳀	𪳁	𪳂	𪳃	𪳄	𪳅	𪳆	𪳇	𪳈	𪳉	𪳊	𪳋	𪳌	𪳍	𪳎	𪳏
U+2ACDx	𪳐	𪳑	𪳒	𪳓	𪳔	𪳕	𪳖	𪳗	𪳘	𪳙	𪳚	𪳛	𪳜	𪳝	𪳞	𪳟
U+2ACEx	𪳠	𪳡	𪳢	𪳣	𪳤	𪳥	𪳦	𪳧	𪳨	𪳩	𪳪	𪳫	𪳬	𪳭	𪳮	𪳯
U+2ACFx	𪳰	𪳱	𪳲	𪳳	𪳴	𪳵	𪳶	𪳷	𪳸	𪳹	𪳺	𪳻	𪳼	𪳽	𪳾	𪳿
U+2AD0x	𪴀	𪴁	𪴂	𪴃	𪴄	𪴅	𪴆	𪴇	𪴈	𪴉	𪴊	𪴋	𪴌	𪴍	𪴎	𪴏
U+2AD1x	𪴐	𪴑	𪴒	𪴓	𪴔	𪴕	𪴖	𪴗	𪴘	𪴙	𪴚	𪴛	𪴜	𪴝	𪴞	𪴟
U+2AD2x	𪴠	𪴡	𪴢	𪴣	𪴤	𪴥	𪴦	𪴧	𪴨	𪴩	𪴪	𪴫	𪴬	𪴭	𪴮	𪴯
U+2AD3x	𪴰	𪴱	𪴲	𪴳	𪴴	𪴵	𪴶	𪴷	𪴸	𪴹	𪴺	𪴻	𪴼	𪴽	𪴾	𪴿
U+2AD4x	𪵀	𪵁	𪵂	𪵃	𪵄	𪵅	𪵆	𪵇	𪵈	𪵉	𪵊	𪵋	𪵌	𪵍	𪵎	𪵏
U+2AD5x	𪵐	𪵑	𪵒	𪵓	𪵔	𪵕	𪵖	𪵗	𪵘	𪵙	𪵚	𪵛	𪵜	𪵝	𪵞	𪵟
U+2AD6x	𪵠	𪵡	𪵢	𪵣	𪵤	𪵥	𪵦	𪵧	𪵨	𪵩	𪵪	𪵫	𪵬	𪵭	𪵮	𪵯
U+2AD7x	𪵰	𪵱	𪵲	𪵳	𪵴	𪵵	𪵶	𪵷	𪵸	𪵹	𪵺	𪵻	𪵼	𪵽	𪵾	𪵿
U+2AD8x	𪶀	𪶁	𪶂	𪶃	𪶄	𪶅	𪶆	𪶇	𪶈	𪶉	𪶊	𪶋	𪶌	𪶍	𪶎	𪶏
U+2AD9x	𪶐	𪶑	𪶒	𪶓	𪶔	𪶕	𪶖	𪶗	𪶘	𪶙	𪶚	𪶛	𪶜	𪶝	𪶞	𪶟
U+2ADAx	𪶠	𪶡	𪶢	𪶣	𪶤	𪶥	𪶦	𪶧	𪶨	𪶩	𪶪	𪶫	𪶬	𪶭	𪶮	𪶯
U+2ADBx	𪶰	𪶱	𪶲	𪶳	𪶴	𪶵	𪶶	𪶷	𪶸	𪶹	𪶺	𪶻	𪶼	𪶽	𪶾	𪶿
U+2ADCx	𪷀	𪷁	𪷂	𪷃	𪷄	𪷅	𪷆	𪷇	𪷈	𪷉	𪷊	𪷋	𪷌	𪷍	𪷎	𪷏
U+2ADDx	𪷐	𪷑	𪷒	𪷓	𪷔	𪷕	𪷖	𪷗	𪷘	𪷙	𪷚	𪷛	𪷜	𪷝	𪷞	𪷟
U+2ADEx	𪷠	𪷡	𪷢	𪷣	𪷤	𪷥	𪷦	𪷧	𪷨	𪷩	𪷪	𪷫	𪷬	𪷭	𪷮	𪷯
U+2ADFx	𪷰	𪷱	𪷲	𪷳	𪷴	𪷵	𪷶	𪷷	𪷸	𪷹	𪷺	𪷻	𪷼	𪷽	𪷾	𪷿
U+2AE0x	𪸀	𪸁	𪸂	𪸃	𪸄	𪸅	𪸆	𪸇	𪸈	𪸉	𪸊	𪸋	𪸌	𪸍	𪸎	𪸏
U+2AE1x	𪸐	𪸑	𪸒	𪸓	𪸔	𪸕	𪸖	𪸗	𪸘	𪸙	𪸚	𪸛	𪸜	𪸝	𪸞	𪸟
U+2AE2x	𪸠	𪸡	𪸢	𪸣	𪸤	𪸥	𪸦	𪸧	𪸨	𪸩	𪸪	𪸫	𪸬	𪸭	𪸮	𪸯
U+2AE3x	𪸰	𪸱	𪸲	𪸳	𪸴	𪸵	𪸶	𪸷	𪸸	𪸹	𪸺	𪸻	𪸼	𪸽	𪸾	𪸿
U+2AE4x	𪹀	𪹁	𪹂	𪹃	𪹄	𪹅	𪹆	𪹇	𪹈	𪹉	𪹊	𪹋	𪹌	𪹍	𪹎	𪹏
U+2AE5x	𪹐	𪹑	𪹒	𪹓	𪹔	𪹕	𪹖	𪹗	𪹘	𪹙	𪹚	𪹛	𪹜	𪹝	𪹞	𪹟
U+2AE6x	𪹠	𪹡	𪹢	𪹣	𪹤	𪹥	𪹦	𪹧	𪹨	𪹩	𪹪	𪹫	𪹬	𪹭	𪹮	𪹯
U+2AE7x	𪹰	𪹱	𪹲	𪹳	𪹴	𪹵	𪹶	𪹷	𪹸	𪹹	𪹺	𪹻	𪹼	𪹽	𪹾	𪹿
U+2AE8x	𪺀	𪺁	𪺂	𪺃	𪺄	𪺅	𪺆	𪺇	𪺈	𪺉	𪺊	𪺋	𪺌	𪺍	𪺎	𪺏
U+2AE9x	𪺐	𪺑	𪺒	𪺓	𪺔	𪺕	𪺖	𪺗	𪺘	𪺙	𪺚	𪺛	𪺜	𪺝	𪺞	𪺟
U+2AEAx	𪺠	𪺡	𪺢	𪺣	𪺤	𪺥	𪺦	𪺧	𪺨	𪺩	𪺪	𪺫	𪺬	𪺭	𪺮	𪺯
U+2AEBx	𪺰	𪺱	𪺲	𪺳	𪺴	𪺵	𪺶	𪺷	𪺸	𪺹	𪺺	𪺻	𪺼	𪺽	𪺾	𪺿
U+2AECx	𪻀	𪻁	𪻂	𪻃	𪻄	𪻅	𪻆	𪻇	𪻈	𪻉	𪻊	𪻋	𪻌	𪻍	𪻎	𪻏
U+2AEDx	𪻐	𪻑	𪻒	𪻓	𪻔	𪻕	𪻖	𪻗	𪻘	𪻙	𪻚	𪻛	𪻜	𪻝	𪻞	𪻟
U+2AEEx	𪻠	𪻡	𪻢	𪻣	𪻤	𪻥	𪻦	𪻧	𪻨	𪻩	𪻪	𪻫	𪻬	𪻭	𪻮	𪻯
U+2AEFx	𪻰	𪻱	𪻲	𪻳	𪻴	𪻵	𪻶	𪻷	𪻸	𪻹	𪻺	𪻻	𪻼	𪻽	𪻾	𪻿
U+2AF0x	𪼀	𪼁	𪼂	𪼃	𪼄	𪼅	𪼆	𪼇	𪼈	𪼉	𪼊	𪼋	𪼌	𪼍	𪼎	𪼏
U+2AF1x	𪼐	𪼑	𪼒	𪼓	𪼔	𪼕	𪼖	𪼗	𪼘	𪼙	𪼚	𪼛	𪼜	𪼝	𪼞	𪼟
U+2AF2x	𪼠	𪼡	𪼢	𪼣	𪼤	𪼥	𪼦	𪼧	𪼨	𪼩	𪼪	𪼫	𪼬	𪼭	𪼮	𪼯
U+2AF3x	𪼰	𪼱	𪼲	𪼳	𪼴	𪼵	𪼶	𪼷	𪼸	𪼹	𪼺	𪼻	𪼼	𪼽	𪼾	𪼿
U+2AF4x	𪽀	𪽁	𪽂	𪽃	𪽄	𪽅	𪽆	𪽇	𪽈	𪽉	𪽊	𪽋	𪽌	𪽍	𪽎	𪽏
U+2AF5x	𪽐	𪽑	𪽒	𪽓	𪽔	𪽕	𪽖	𪽗	𪽘	𪽙	𪽚	𪽛	𪽜	𪽝	𪽞	𪽟
U+2AF6x	𪽠	𪽡	𪽢	𪽣	𪽤	𪽥	𪽦	𪽧	𪽨	𪽩	𪽪	𪽫	𪽬	𪽭	𪽮	𪽯
U+2AF7x	𪽰	𪽱	𪽲	𪽳	𪽴	𪽵	𪽶	𪽷	𪽸	𪽹	𪽺	𪽻	𪽼	𪽽	𪽾	𪽿
U+2AF8x	𪾀	𪾁	𪾂	𪾃	𪾄	𪾅	𪾆	𪾇	𪾈	𪾉	𪾊	𪾋	𪾌	𪾍	𪾎	𪾏
U+2AF9x	𪾐	𪾑	𪾒	𪾓	𪾔	𪾕	𪾖	𪾗	𪾘	𪾙	𪾚	𪾛	𪾜	𪾝	𪾞	𪾟
U+2AFAx	𪾠	𪾡	𪾢	𪾣	𪾤	𪾥	𪾦	𪾧	𪾨	𪾩	𪾪	𪾫	𪾬	𪾭	𪾮	𪾯
U+2AFBx	𪾰	𪾱	𪾲	𪾳	𪾴	𪾵	𪾶	𪾷	𪾸	𪾹	𪾺	𪾻	𪾼	𪾽	𪾾	𪾿
U+2AFCx	𪿀	𪿁	𪿂	𪿃	𪿄	𪿅	𪿆	𪿇	𪿈	𪿉	𪿊	𪿋	𪿌	𪿍	𪿎	𪿏
U+2AFDx	𪿐	𪿑	𪿒	𪿓	𪿔	𪿕	𪿖	𪿗	𪿘	𪿙	𪿚	𪿛	𪿜	𪿝	𪿞	𪿟
U+2AFEx	𪿠	𪿡	𪿢	𪿣	𪿤	𪿥	𪿦	𪿧	𪿨	𪿩	𪿪	𪿫	𪿬	𪿭	𪿮	𪿯
U+2AFFx	𪿰	𪿱	𪿲	𪿳	𪿴	𪿵	𪿶	𪿷	𪿸	𪿹	𪿺	𪿻	𪿼	𪿽	𪿾	𪿿
U+2B00x	𫀀	𫀁	𫀂	𫀃	𫀄	𫀅	𫀆	𫀇	𫀈	𫀉	𫀊	𫀋	𫀌	𫀍	𫀎	𫀏
U+2B01x	𫀐	𫀑	𫀒	𫀓	𫀔	𫀕	𫀖	𫀗	𫀘	𫀙	𫀚	𫀛	𫀜	𫀝	𫀞	𫀟
U+2B02x	𫀠	𫀡	𫀢	𫀣	𫀤	𫀥	𫀦	𫀧	𫀨	𫀩	𫀪	𫀫	𫀬	𫀭	𫀮	𫀯
U+2B03x	𫀰	𫀱	𫀲	𫀳	𫀴	𫀵	𫀶	𫀷	𫀸	𫀹	𫀺	𫀻	𫀼	𫀽	𫀾	𫀿
U+2B04x	𫁀	𫁁	𫁂	𫁃	𫁄	𫁅	𫁆	𫁇	𫁈	𫁉	𫁊	𫁋	𫁌	𫁍	𫁎	𫁏
U+2B05x	𫁐	𫁑	𫁒	𫁓	𫁔	𫁕	𫁖	𫁗	𫁘	𫁙	𫁚	𫁛	𫁜	𫁝	𫁞	𫁟
U+2B06x	𫁠	𫁡	𫁢	𫁣	𫁤	𫁥	𫁦	𫁧	𫁨	𫁩	𫁪	𫁫	𫁬	𫁭	𫁮	𫁯
U+2B07x	𫁰	𫁱	𫁲	𫁳	𫁴	𫁵	𫁶	𫁷	𫁸	𫁹	𫁺	𫁻	𫁼	𫁽	𫁾	𫁿
U+2B08x	𫂀	𫂁	𫂂	𫂃	𫂄	𫂅	𫂆	𫂇	𫂈	𫂉	𫂊	𫂋	𫂌	𫂍	𫂎	𫂏
U+2B09x	𫂐	𫂑	𫂒	𫂓	𫂔	𫂕	𫂖	𫂗	𫂘	𫂙	𫂚	𫂛	𫂜	𫂝	𫂞	𫂟
U+2B0Ax	𫂠	𫂡	𫂢	𫂣	𫂤	𫂥	𫂦	𫂧	𫂨	𫂩	𫂪	𫂫	𫂬	𫂭	𫂮	𫂯
U+2B0Bx	𫂰	𫂱	𫂲	𫂳	𫂴	𫂵	𫂶	𫂷	𫂸	𫂹	𫂺	𫂻	𫂼	𫂽	𫂾	𫂿
U+2B0Cx	𫃀	𫃁	𫃂	𫃃	𫃄	𫃅	𫃆	𫃇	𫃈	𫃉	𫃊	𫃋	𫃌	𫃍	𫃎	𫃏
U+2B0Dx	𫃐	𫃑	𫃒	𫃓	𫃔	𫃕	𫃖	𫃗	𫃘	𫃙	𫃚	𫃛	𫃜	𫃝	𫃞	𫃟
U+2B0Ex	𫃠	𫃡	𫃢	𫃣	𫃤	𫃥	𫃦	𫃧	𫃨	𫃩	𫃪	𫃫	𫃬	𫃭	𫃮	𫃯
U+2B0Fx	𫃰	𫃱	𫃲	𫃳	𫃴	𫃵	𫃶	𫃷	𫃸	𫃹	𫃺	𫃻	𫃼	𫃽	𫃾	𫃿
U+2B10x	𫄀	𫄁	𫄂	𫄃	𫄄	𫄅	𫄆	𫄇	𫄈	𫄉	𫄊	𫄋	𫄌	𫄍	𫄎	𫄏
U+2B11x	𫄐	𫄑	𫄒	𫄓	𫄔	𫄕	𫄖	𫄗	𫄘	𫄙	𫄚	𫄛	𫄜	𫄝	𫄞	𫄟
U+2B12x	𫄠	𫄡	𫄢	𫄣	𫄤	𫄥	𫄦	𫄧	𫄨	𫄩	𫄪	𫄫	𫄬	𫄭	𫄮	𫄯
U+2B13x	𫄰	𫄱	𫄲	𫄳	𫄴	𫄵	𫄶	𫄷	𫄸	𫄹	𫄺	𫄻	𫄼	𫄽	𫄾	𫄿
U+2B14x	𫅀	𫅁	𫅂	𫅃	𫅄	𫅅	𫅆	𫅇	𫅈	𫅉	𫅊	𫅋	𫅌	𫅍	𫅎	𫅏
U+2B15x	𫅐	𫅑	𫅒	𫅓	𫅔	𫅕	𫅖	𫅗	𫅘	𫅙	𫅚	𫅛	𫅜	𫅝	𫅞	𫅟
U+2B16x	𫅠	𫅡	𫅢	𫅣	𫅤	𫅥	𫅦	𫅧	𫅨	𫅩	𫅪	𫅫	𫅬	𫅭	𫅮	𫅯
U+2B17x	𫅰	𫅱	𫅲	𫅳	𫅴	𫅵	𫅶	𫅷	𫅸	𫅹	𫅺	𫅻	𫅼	𫅽	𫅾	𫅿
U+2B18x	𫆀	𫆁	𫆂	𫆃	𫆄	𫆅	𫆆	𫆇	𫆈	𫆉	𫆊	𫆋	𫆌	𫆍	𫆎	𫆏
U+2B19x	𫆐	𫆑	𫆒	𫆓	𫆔	𫆕	𫆖	𫆗	𫆘	𫆙	𫆚	𫆛	𫆜	𫆝	𫆞	𫆟
U+2B1Ax	𫆠	𫆡	𫆢	𫆣	𫆤	𫆥	𫆦	𫆧	𫆨	𫆩	𫆪	𫆫	𫆬	𫆭	𫆮	𫆯
U+2B1Bx	𫆰	𫆱	𫆲	𫆳	𫆴	𫆵	𫆶	𫆷	𫆸	𫆹	𫆺	𫆻	𫆼	𫆽	𫆾	𫆿
U+2B1Cx	𫇀	𫇁	𫇂	𫇃	𫇄	𫇅	𫇆	𫇇	𫇈	𫇉	𫇊	𫇋	𫇌	𫇍	𫇎	𫇏
U+2B1Dx	𫇐	𫇑	𫇒	𫇓	𫇔	𫇕	𫇖	𫇗	𫇘	𫇙	𫇚	𫇛	𫇜	𫇝	𫇞	𫇟
U+2B1Ex	𫇠	𫇡	𫇢	𫇣	𫇤	𫇥	𫇦	𫇧	𫇨	𫇩	𫇪	𫇫	𫇬	𫇭	𫇮	𫇯
U+2B1Fx	𫇰	𫇱	𫇲	𫇳	𫇴	𫇵	𫇶	𫇷	𫇸	𫇹	𫇺	𫇻	𫇼	𫇽	𫇾	𫇿
U+2B20x	𫈀	𫈁	𫈂	𫈃	𫈄	𫈅	𫈆	𫈇	𫈈	𫈉	𫈊	𫈋	𫈌	𫈍	𫈎	𫈏
U+2B21x	𫈐	𫈑	𫈒	𫈓	𫈔	𫈕	𫈖	𫈗	𫈘	𫈙	𫈚	𫈛	𫈜	𫈝	𫈞	𫈟
U+2B22x	𫈠	𫈡	𫈢	𫈣	𫈤	𫈥	𫈦	𫈧	𫈨	𫈩	𫈪	𫈫	𫈬	𫈭	𫈮	𫈯
U+2B23x	𫈰	𫈱	𫈲	𫈳	𫈴	𫈵	𫈶	𫈷	𫈸	𫈹	𫈺	𫈻	𫈼	𫈽	𫈾	𫈿
U+2B24x	𫉀	𫉁	𫉂	𫉃	𫉄	𫉅	𫉆	𫉇	𫉈	𫉉	𫉊	𫉋	𫉌	𫉍	𫉎	𫉏
U+2B25x	𫉐	𫉑	𫉒	𫉓	𫉔	𫉕	𫉖	𫉗	𫉘	𫉙	𫉚	𫉛	𫉜	𫉝	𫉞	𫉟
U+2B26x	𫉠	𫉡	𫉢	𫉣	𫉤	𫉥	𫉦	𫉧	𫉨	𫉩	𫉪	𫉫	𫉬	𫉭	𫉮	𫉯
U+2B27x	𫉰	𫉱	𫉲	𫉳	𫉴	𫉵	𫉶	𫉷	𫉸	𫉹	𫉺	𫉻	𫉼	𫉽	𫉾	𫉿
U+2B28x	𫊀	𫊁	𫊂	𫊃	𫊄	𫊅	𫊆	𫊇	𫊈	𫊉	𫊊	𫊋	𫊌	𫊍	𫊎	𫊏
U+2B29x	𫊐	𫊑	𫊒	𫊓	𫊔	𫊕	𫊖	𫊗	𫊘	𫊙	𫊚	𫊛	𫊜	𫊝	𫊞	𫊟
U+2B2Ax	𫊠	𫊡	𫊢	𫊣	𫊤	𫊥	𫊦	𫊧	𫊨	𫊩	𫊪	𫊫	𫊬	𫊭	𫊮	𫊯
U+2B2Bx	𫊰	𫊱	𫊲	𫊳	𫊴	𫊵	𫊶	𫊷	𫊸	𫊹	𫊺	𫊻	𫊼	𫊽	𫊾	𫊿
U+2B2Cx	𫋀	𫋁	𫋂	𫋃	𫋄	𫋅	𫋆	𫋇	𫋈	𫋉	𫋊	𫋋	𫋌	𫋍	𫋎	𫋏
U+2B2Dx	𫋐	𫋑	𫋒	𫋓	𫋔	𫋕	𫋖	𫋗	𫋘	𫋙	𫋚	𫋛	𫋜	𫋝	𫋞	𫋟
U+2B2Ex	𫋠	𫋡	𫋢	𫋣	𫋤	𫋥	𫋦	𫋧	𫋨	𫋩	𫋪	𫋫	𫋬	𫋭	𫋮	𫋯
U+2B2Fx	𫋰	𫋱	𫋲	𫋳	𫋴	𫋵	𫋶	𫋷	𫋸	𫋹	𫋺	𫋻	𫋼	𫋽	𫋾	𫋿
U+2B30x	𫌀	𫌁	𫌂	𫌃	𫌄	𫌅	𫌆	𫌇	𫌈	𫌉	𫌊	𫌋	𫌌	𫌍	𫌎	𫌏
U+2B31x	𫌐	𫌑	𫌒	𫌓	𫌔	𫌕	𫌖	𫌗	𫌘	𫌙	𫌚	𫌛	𫌜	𫌝	𫌞	𫌟
U+2B32x	𫌠	𫌡	𫌢	𫌣	𫌤	𫌥	𫌦	𫌧	𫌨	𫌩	𫌪	𫌫	𫌬	𫌭	𫌮	𫌯
U+2B33x	𫌰	𫌱	𫌲	𫌳	𫌴	𫌵	𫌶	𫌷	𫌸	𫌹	𫌺	𫌻	𫌼	𫌽	𫌾	𫌿
U+2B34x	𫍀	𫍁	𫍂	𫍃	𫍄	𫍅	𫍆	𫍇	𫍈	𫍉	𫍊	𫍋	𫍌	𫍍	𫍎	𫍏
U+2B35x	𫍐	𫍑	𫍒	𫍓	𫍔	𫍕	𫍖	𫍗	𫍘	𫍙	𫍚	𫍛	𫍜	𫍝	𫍞	𫍟
U+2B36x	𫍠	𫍡	𫍢	𫍣	𫍤	𫍥	𫍦	𫍧	𫍨	𫍩	𫍪	𫍫	𫍬	𫍭	𫍮	𫍯
U+2B37x	𫍰	𫍱	𫍲	𫍳	𫍴	𫍵	𫍶	𫍷	𫍸	𫍹	𫍺	𫍻	𫍼	𫍽	𫍾	𫍿
U+2B38x	𫎀	𫎁	𫎂	𫎃	𫎄	𫎅	𫎆	𫎇	𫎈	𫎉	𫎊	𫎋	𫎌	𫎍	𫎎	𫎏
U+2B39x	𫎐	𫎑	𫎒	𫎓	𫎔	𫎕	𫎖	𫎗	𫎘	𫎙	𫎚	𫎛	𫎜	𫎝	𫎞	𫎟
U+2B3Ax	𫎠	𫎡	𫎢	𫎣	𫎤	𫎥	𫎦	𫎧	𫎨	𫎩	𫎪	𫎫	𫎬	𫎭	𫎮	𫎯
U+2B3Bx	𫎰	𫎱	𫎲	𫎳	𫎴	𫎵	𫎶	𫎷	𫎸	𫎹	𫎺	𫎻	𫎼	𫎽	𫎾	𫎿
U+2B3Cx	𫏀	𫏁	𫏂	𫏃	𫏄	𫏅	𫏆	𫏇	𫏈	𫏉	𫏊	𫏋	𫏌	𫏍	𫏎	𫏏
U+2B3Dx	𫏐	𫏑	𫏒	𫏓	𫏔	𫏕	𫏖	𫏗	𫏘	𫏙	𫏚	𫏛	𫏜	𫏝	𫏞	𫏟
U+2B3Ex	𫏠	𫏡	𫏢	𫏣	𫏤	𫏥	𫏦	𫏧	𫏨	𫏩	𫏪	𫏫	𫏬	𫏭	𫏮	𫏯
U+2B3Fx	𫏰	𫏱	𫏲	𫏳	𫏴	𫏵	𫏶	𫏷	𫏸	𫏹	𫏺	𫏻	𫏼	𫏽	𫏾	𫏿
U+2B40x	𫐀	𫐁	𫐂	𫐃	𫐄	𫐅	𫐆	𫐇	𫐈	𫐉	𫐊	𫐋	𫐌	𫐍	𫐎	𫐏
U+2B41x	𫐐	𫐑	𫐒	𫐓	𫐔	𫐕	𫐖	𫐗	𫐘	𫐙	𫐚	𫐛	𫐜	𫐝	𫐞	𫐟
U+2B42x	𫐠	𫐡	𫐢	𫐣	𫐤	𫐥	𫐦	𫐧	𫐨	𫐩	𫐪	𫐫	𫐬	𫐭	𫐮	𫐯
U+2B43x	𫐰	𫐱	𫐲	𫐳	𫐴	𫐵	𫐶	𫐷	𫐸	𫐹	𫐺	𫐻	𫐼	𫐽	𫐾	𫐿
U+2B44x	𫑀	𫑁	𫑂	𫑃	𫑄	𫑅	𫑆	𫑇	𫑈	𫑉	𫑊	𫑋	𫑌	𫑍	𫑎	𫑏
U+2B45x	𫑐	𫑑	𫑒	𫑓	𫑔	𫑕	𫑖	𫑗	𫑘	𫑙	𫑚	𫑛	𫑜	𫑝	𫑞	𫑟
U+2B46x	𫑠	𫑡	𫑢	𫑣	𫑤	𫑥	𫑦	𫑧	𫑨	𫑩	𫑪	𫑫	𫑬	𫑭	𫑮	𫑯
U+2B47x	𫑰	𫑱	𫑲	𫑳	𫑴	𫑵	𫑶	𫑷	𫑸	𫑹	𫑺	𫑻	𫑼	𫑽	𫑾	𫑿
U+2B48x	𫒀	𫒁	𫒂	𫒃	𫒄	𫒅	𫒆	𫒇	𫒈	𫒉	𫒊	𫒋	𫒌	𫒍	𫒎	𫒏
U+2B49x	𫒐	𫒑	𫒒	𫒓	𫒔	𫒕	𫒖	𫒗	𫒘	𫒙	𫒚	𫒛	𫒜	𫒝	𫒞	𫒟
U+2B4Ax	𫒠	𫒡	𫒢	𫒣	𫒤	𫒥	𫒦	𫒧	𫒨	𫒩	𫒪	𫒫	𫒬	𫒭	𫒮	𫒯
U+2B4Bx	𫒰	𫒱	𫒲	𫒳	𫒴	𫒵	𫒶	𫒷	𫒸	𫒹	𫒺	𫒻	𫒼	𫒽	𫒾	𫒿
U+2B4Cx	𫓀	𫓁	𫓂	𫓃	𫓄	𫓅	𫓆	𫓇	𫓈	𫓉	𫓊	𫓋	𫓌	𫓍	𫓎	𫓏
U+2B4Dx	𫓐	𫓑	𫓒	𫓓	𫓔	𫓕	𫓖	𫓗	𫓘	𫓙	𫓚	𫓛	𫓜	𫓝	𫓞	𫓟
U+2B4Ex	𫓠	𫓡	𫓢	𫓣	𫓤	𫓥	𫓦	𫓧	𫓨	𫓩	𫓪	𫓫	𫓬	𫓭	𫓮	𫓯
U+2B4Fx	𫓰	𫓱	𫓲	𫓳	𫓴	𫓵	𫓶	𫓷	𫓸	𫓹	𫓺	𫓻	𫓼	𫓽	𫓾	𫓿
U+2B50x	𫔀	𫔁	𫔂	𫔃	𫔄	𫔅	𫔆	𫔇	𫔈	𫔉	𫔊	𫔋	𫔌	𫔍	𫔎	𫔏
U+2B51x	𫔐	𫔑	𫔒	𫔓	𫔔	𫔕	𫔖	𫔗	𫔘	𫔙	𫔚	𫔛	𫔜	𫔝	𫔞	𫔟
U+2B52x	𫔠	𫔡	𫔢	𫔣	𫔤	𫔥	𫔦	𫔧	𫔨	𫔩	𫔪	𫔫	𫔬	𫔭	𫔮	𫔯
U+2B53x	𫔰	𫔱	𫔲	𫔳	𫔴	𫔵	𫔶	𫔷	𫔸	𫔹	𫔺	𫔻	𫔼	𫔽	𫔾	𫔿
U+2B54x	𫕀	𫕁	𫕂	𫕃	𫕄	𫕅	𫕆	𫕇	𫕈	𫕉	𫕊	𫕋	𫕌	𫕍	𫕎	𫕏
U+2B55x	𫕐	𫕑	𫕒	𫕓	𫕔	𫕕	𫕖	𫕗	𫕘	𫕙	𫕚	𫕛	𫕜	𫕝	𫕞	𫕟
U+2B56x	𫕠	𫕡	𫕢	𫕣	𫕤	𫕥	𫕦	𫕧	𫕨	𫕩	𫕪	𫕫	𫕬	𫕭	𫕮	𫕯
U+2B57x	𫕰	𫕱	𫕲	𫕳	𫕴	𫕵	𫕶	𫕷	𫕸	𫕹	𫕺	𫕻	𫕼	𫕽	𫕾	𫕿
U+2B58x	𫖀	𫖁	𫖂	𫖃	𫖄	𫖅	𫖆	𫖇	𫖈	𫖉	𫖊	𫖋	𫖌	𫖍	𫖎	𫖏
U+2B59x	𫖐	𫖑	𫖒	𫖓	𫖔	𫖕	𫖖	𫖗	𫖘	𫖙	𫖚	𫖛	𫖜	𫖝	𫖞	𫖟
U+2B5Ax	𫖠	𫖡	𫖢	𫖣	𫖤	𫖥	𫖦	𫖧	𫖨	𫖩	𫖪	𫖫	𫖬	𫖭	𫖮	𫖯
U+2B5Bx	𫖰	𫖱	𫖲	𫖳	𫖴	𫖵	𫖶	𫖷	𫖸	𫖹	𫖺	𫖻	𫖼	𫖽	𫖾	𫖿
U+2B5Cx	𫗀	𫗁	𫗂	𫗃	𫗄	𫗅	𫗆	𫗇	𫗈	𫗉	𫗊	𫗋	𫗌	𫗍	𫗎	𫗏
U+2B5Dx	𫗐	𫗑	𫗒	𫗓	𫗔	𫗕	𫗖	𫗗	𫗘	𫗙	𫗚	𫗛	𫗜	𫗝	𫗞	𫗟
U+2B5Ex	𫗠	𫗡	𫗢	𫗣	𫗤	𫗥	𫗦	𫗧	𫗨	𫗩	𫗪	𫗫	𫗬	𫗭	𫗮	𫗯
U+2B5Fx	𫗰	𫗱	𫗲	𫗳	𫗴	𫗵	𫗶	𫗷	𫗸	𫗹	𫗺	𫗻	𫗼	𫗽	𫗾	𫗿
U+2B60x	𫘀	𫘁	𫘂	𫘃	𫘄	𫘅	𫘆	𫘇	𫘈	𫘉	𫘊	𫘋	𫘌	𫘍	𫘎	𫘏
U+2B61x	𫘐	𫘑	𫘒	𫘓	𫘔	𫘕	𫘖	𫘗	𫘘	𫘙	𫘚	𫘛	𫘜	𫘝	𫘞	𫘟
U+2B62x	𫘠	𫘡	𫘢	𫘣	𫘤	𫘥	𫘦	𫘧	𫘨	𫘩	𫘪	𫘫	𫘬	𫘭	𫘮	𫘯
U+2B63x	𫘰	𫘱	𫘲	𫘳	𫘴	𫘵	𫘶	𫘷	𫘸	𫘹	𫘺	𫘻	𫘼	𫘽	𫘾	𫘿
U+2B64x	𫙀	𫙁	𫙂	𫙃	𫙄	𫙅	𫙆	𫙇	𫙈	𫙉	𫙊	𫙋	𫙌	𫙍	𫙎	𫙏
U+2B65x	𫙐	𫙑	𫙒	𫙓	𫙔	𫙕	𫙖	𫙗	𫙘	𫙙	𫙚	𫙛	𫙜	𫙝	𫙞	𫙟
U+2B66x	𫙠	𫙡	𫙢	𫙣	𫙤	𫙥	𫙦	𫙧	𫙨	𫙩	𫙪	𫙫	𫙬	𫙭	𫙮	𫙯
U+2B67x	𫙰	𫙱	𫙲	𫙳	𫙴	𫙵	𫙶	𫙷	𫙸	𫙹	𫙺	𫙻	𫙼	𫙽	𫙾	𫙿
U+2B68x	𫚀	𫚁	𫚂	𫚃	𫚄	𫚅	𫚆	𫚇	𫚈	𫚉	𫚊	𫚋	𫚌	𫚍	𫚎	𫚏
U+2B69x	𫚐	𫚑	𫚒	𫚓	𫚔	𫚕	𫚖	𫚗	𫚘	𫚙	𫚚	𫚛	𫚜	𫚝	𫚞	𫚟
U+2B6Ax	𫚠	𫚡	𫚢	𫚣	𫚤	𫚥	𫚦	𫚧	𫚨	𫚩	𫚪	𫚫	𫚬	𫚭	𫚮	𫚯
U+2B6Bx	𫚰	𫚱	𫚲	𫚳	𫚴	𫚵	𫚶	𫚷	𫚸	𫚹	𫚺	𫚻	𫚼	𫚽	𫚾	𫚿
U+2B6Cx	𫛀	𫛁	𫛂	𫛃	𫛄	𫛅	𫛆	𫛇	𫛈	𫛉	𫛊	𫛋	𫛌	𫛍	𫛎	𫛏
U+2B6Dx	𫛐	𫛑	𫛒	𫛓	𫛔	𫛕	𫛖	𫛗	𫛘	𫛙	𫛚	𫛛	𫛜	𫛝	𫛞	𫛟
U+2B6Ex	𫛠	𫛡	𫛢	𫛣	𫛤	𫛥	𫛦	𫛧	𫛨	𫛩	𫛪	𫛫	𫛬	𫛭	𫛮	𫛯
U+2B6Fx	𫛰	𫛱	𫛲	𫛳	𫛴	𫛵	𫛶	𫛷	𫛸	𫛹	𫛺	𫛻	𫛼	𫛽	𫛾	𫛿
U+2B70x	𫜀	𫜁	𫜂	𫜃	𫜄	𫜅	𫜆	𫜇	𫜈	𫜉	𫜊	𫜋	𫜌	𫜍	𫜎	𫜏
U+2B71x	𫜐	𫜑	𫜒	𫜓	𫜔	𫜕	𫜖	𫜗	𫜘	𫜙	𫜚	𫜛	𫜜	𫜝	𫜞	𫜟
U+2B72x	𫜠	𫜡	𫜢	𫜣	𫜤	𫜥	𫜦	𫜧	𫜨	𫜩	𫜪	𫜫	𫜬	𫜭	𫜮	𫜯
U+2B73x	𫜰	𫜱	𫜲	𫜳	𫜴	𫜵	𫜶	𫜷	𫜸	𫜹	𫜺	𫜻	𫜼	𫜽	𫜾	𫜿
Notes 1.As of Unicode version 17.0

== History ==
The following Unicode-related documents record the purpose and process of defining specific characters in the CJK Unified Ideographs Extension C block:

Version	Final code points (Note: Proposed code points and characters names may differ from final code points and names)	Count	L2 ID	WG2 ID	IRG ID	Document
5.2	U+2A700..2B734	4,149	L2/02-462	N2563		Suignard, Michel (2002-12-11), CJK Compatibility Ideograph source reference fixes
5.2	U+2A700..2B734	4,149	L2/06-390	N3134	N1226	Proposal to encode CJK Unified Ideographs Extension C1 in SIP, 2006-08-27
5.2	U+2A700..2B734	4,149		N3153 (pdf, doc)		Umamaheswaran, V. S. (2007-02-16), "M49.19", Unconfirmed minutes of WG 2 meeting 49 AIST, Akihabara, Tokyo, Japan; 2006-09-25/29
5.2	U+2A700..2B734	4,149	L2/06-363			Jenkins, John (2006-11-01), UTC Extension C1 Characters
5.2	U+2A700..2B734	4,149	L2/06-351			Whistler, Ken (2006-11-06), "CJK Unified Ideographs Extension C", WG2 Consent Docket
5.2	U+2A700..2B734	4,149	L2/06-390.1	N3134.1		Proposal to encode CJK Unified Ideographs Extension C1 in SIP, Data files part 1, 2006-11-13
5.2	U+2A700..2B734	4,149	L2/06-390.2	N3134.2		Proposal to encode CJK Unified Ideographs Extension C1 in SIP, Data files part 2, 2006-11-13
5.2	U+2A700..2B734	4,149	L2/06-390.3	N3134.3		Proposal to encode CJK Unified Ideographs Extension C1 in SIP, Data files part 3, 2006-11-13
5.2	U+2A700..2B734	4,149		N3134.4		Proposal to encode CJK Unified Ideographs Extension C1 in SIP, Attachment B (detailed source information for every character), 2006-11-13
5.2	U+2A700..2B734	4,149	L2/06-404	N3190		Lu, Qin (2006-12-21), CJK Ext. C Multicolumn Code Table
5.2	U+2A700..2B734	4,149	L2/07-125	N3244		Review of CJK-C Repertoire, 2007-04-24
5.2	U+2A700..2B734	4,149		N3267		Summary response to comments on CJK Ext. C in pDam4, 2007-04-25
5.2	U+2A700..2B734	4,149		N3353 (pdf, doc)		Umamaheswaran, V. S. (2007-10-10), "M51.11g - M51.11j", Unconfirmed minutes of WG 2 meeting 51 Hanzhou, China; 2007-04-24/27
5.2	U+2A700..2B734	4,149	L2/07-160			Jenkins, John (2007-05-10), U-source Correction for Extension C
5.2	U+2A700..2B734	4,149	L2/07-118R2			Moore, Lisa (2007-05-23), "IRG - Review of CJK-C Repertoire", UTC #111 Minutes
5.2	U+2A700..2B734	4,149	L2/07-244	N3281, N3281-A, N3281-B	N1331	Lu, Qin (2007-07-16), Request for Glyph Change in CJK C PDAM5
5.2	U+2A700..2B734	4,149	L2/07-245	N3280, N3280-A, N3280-B	N1330	Lu, Qin (2007-07-16), Request for Removal of Characters in CJK C PDAM5
5.2	U+2A700..2B734	4,149	L2/07-268	N3253 (pdf, doc)		Umamaheswaran, V. S. (2007-07-26), "M50.12", Unconfirmed minutes of WG 2 meeting 50, Frankfurt-am-Main, Germany; 2007-04-24/27
5.2	U+2A700..2B734	4,149	L2/07-225			Moore, Lisa (2007-08-21), "B.3", UTC #112 Minutes
5.2	U+2A700..2B734	4,149		N3279		CJK Extension C code charts, spreadsheet, chart part 1, chart part 2, 2007-10-22
5.2	U+2A700..2B734	4,149	L2/08-227			Suignard, Michel (2008-05-15), CJK Extension C Repertoire
5.2	U+2A700..2B734	4,149	L2/08-310			Cook, Richard (2008-08-12), Fonts for Extension B and C and IRG
5.2	U+2A700..2B734	4,149	L2/08-161R2			Moore, Lisa (2008-11-05), "Consensus 115-C21", UTC #115 Minutes, "Approve 4,149 CJK ideographs in Extension C at codepoints U+2A700..U+2B734 for encoding in a future version of the standard."
5.2	U+2A700..2B734	4,149	L2/10-195			Suignard, Michel (2010-05-10), CJK Charts
5.2	U+2A700..2B734	4,149	L2/11-243	N4111		Sources for Orphaned CJK Ideographs, 2011-06-14
5.2	U+2A700..2B734	4,149	L2/11-254			Constable, Peter (2011-06-20), "Update to UTR #45 U-Source Ideographs requested", UTC Liaison Report from WG2
5.2	U+2A700..2B734	4,149		N4103		"Resolution 58.05 and M58.06", Unconfirmed minutes of WG 2 meeting 58, 2012-01-03
5.2	U+2A700..2B734	4,149		N4558		Request of Changing One CJK_C Source and Glyph [U+2A92F], 2014-02-25
5.2	U+2A700..2B734	4,149		N4553 (pdf, doc)		Umamaheswaran, V. S. (2014-09-16), "M62.01d, M62.01i", Minutes of WG 2 meeting 62 Adobe, San Jose, CA, USA
5.2	U+2A700..2B734	4,149	L2/14-260	N4621		Suignard, Michel (2014-10-23), CJK chart and source references update
5.2	U+2A700..2B734	4,149	L2/16-052	N4603 (pdf, doc)		Umamaheswaran, V. S. (2015-09-01), "M63.05", Unconfirmed minutes of WG 2 meeting 63
5.2	U+2A700..2B734	4,149	L2/15-242	N4682		West, Andrew; Fan, Ming (2015-10-16), Error Report for CJK Unified Ideographs Extensions C and E
5.2	U+2A700..2B734	4,149		N4739		"M64.06", Unconfirmed minutes of WG 2 meeting 64, 2016-08-31
5.2	U+2A700..2B734	4,149	L2/17-180		N2202	Chan, Eiso (2017-06-02), Request for consideration to add kIRG_GSource values to thirteen ideographs and change two G-source glyphs for the Table of General Standard Chinese Characters [Affects U+24A7D, U+25ED7, U+2677C, U+26C21, U+2A8FB, U+2A917, and U+2AA30]
5.2	U+2A700..2B734	4,149		N4987		Proposal on China's Horizontal Extension for 14 CJK Ideographs [Affects U+2A917 and 2AA30], 2018-06-13
5.2	U+2A700..2B734	4,149		N4988		Proposal on Updating 11 G glyphs of CJK Unified Ideographs to ISO/IEC 10646 [Affects U+2A8FB], 2018-06-13
5.2	U+2A700..2B734	4,149		N5020 (pdf, doc)		Umamaheswaran, V. S. (2019-01-11), "10.4.8 and 10.4.9", Unconfirmed minutes of WG 2 meeting 67
5.2	U+2A700..2B734	4,149	L2/19-242	N5094	N2370	Chan, Eiso (2019-02-14), 20 questionable V4-Source characters in Ext. C and Ext. E [Affects U+2B1E5]
5.2	U+2A700..2B734	4,149		N5086	N2379	Proposal of China's horizontal extension for technical used characters [Affects U+2AED5, U+2AEF3, U+2AF76 and U+2B09F], 2019-05-10
5.2	U+2A700..2B734	4,149	L2/19-237	N5068		Editorial Report on Miscellaneous Issues (meeting IRG#52) [Affects U+2B1C3 and U+2B1E5], 2019-05-17
5.2	U+2A700..2B734	4,149	L2/19-241	N5083	N2391	Errata report for WG2 submission_TCA [Affects U+2B1C3], 2019-05-31
5.2	U+2A700..2B734	4,149	L2/22-077		N2512R	Shin, SangHyun; Cho, Sungduk; Kim, Kyongsok (2021-11-02), A revised proposal requesting a Horizontal Extension of 51 Hanja chars (previously submitted for ExtF/G/H) [Affects U+2B249]
5.2	U+2A700..2B734	4,149	L2/22-067			Lunde, Ken (2022-04-16), "19 [Affects U+2B249]", CJK & Unihan Group Recommendations for UTC #171 Meeting
5.2	U+2A700..2B734	4,149	L2/22-061			Constable, Peter (2022-07-27), "E.1 Section 19 [Affects U+2B249]", Approved Minutes of UTC Meeting 171
5.2	U+2A700..2B734	4,149	L2/22-258			Shin, SangHyun; Kim, Kyongsok (2022-10-14), Changing glyphs and IDSs of 97 KR Hanja chars containing '叱 (U+53F1)' [Affects U+2A741, 2B173, and 2B490]
5.2	U+2A700..2B734	4,149	L2/22-259		N2556R2	Chan, Eiso; Collins, Lee; Việt, Ngô Trung (2022-10-20), IRGN2556R2 V-Source Glyph and Codes Updates [Affects U+2AB63, 2ACD8, and 2AF6F]
5.2	U+2A700..2B734	4,149	L2/22-247			Lunde, Ken (2022-11-01), "25) L2/22-258 and 26) L2/22-259", CJK & Unihan Group Recommendations for UTC #173 Meeting
5.2	U+2A700..2B734	4,149	L2/22-241			Constable, Peter (2022-11-09), "E.1 25) L2/22-258 and E.1 26) L2/22-259", Approved Minutes of UTC Meeting 173
14.0	U+2B735	1	L2/20-210			Chan, Eiso; Collins, Lee; Nhàn, Ngô Thanh (2020-06-10), Request to dis-unify U+722B
14.0	U+2B735	1	L2/20-235			Lunde, Ken (2020-09-22), "L2/20-210: Request to dis-unify U+722B", Unihan Ad Hoc Recommendations for UTC #165 Meeting
14.0	U+2B735	1	L2/20-237			Moore, Lisa (2020-10-27), "Consensus 165-C10", UTC #165 Minutes
14.0	U+2B736	1	L2/20-291		N2443	Chan, Eiso (2020-12-19), Request for consideration to disunify U+3B3F
14.0	U+2B736	1	L2/21-015			Lunde, Ken (2021-01-15), "L2/20-291: Request for consideration to disunify U+3B3F (IRG N2443)", CJK & Unihan Group Recommendations for UTC #166 Meeting
14.0	U+2B736	1	L2/21-009			Moore, Lisa (2021-01-27), "C.1 — L2/20-291: Request for consideration to disunify U+3B3F (IRG N2443)", UTC #166 Minutes
14.0	U+2B737	1	L2/21-044		N2446	UNC Proposal for One G Source Ideograph, 2021-01-07
14.0	U+2B737	1	L2/21-015			Lunde, Ken (2021-01-15), "L2/21-044: UNC Proposal for One G-Source Ideograph (IRG N2446)", CJK & Unihan Group Recommendations for UTC #166 Meeting
14.0	U+2B737	1	L2/21-009			Moore, Lisa (2021-01-27), "C.1 — L2/21-044 UNC Proposal for One G Source Ideograph", UTC #166 Minutes
14.0	U+2B738	1	L2/21-046		N2447	Jiang, Kushim (2021-01-15), Disunification of U+2F83A
14.0	U+2B738	1	L2/21-072			Lunde, Ken (2021-04-26), "L2/21-046: Disunification of U+2F83A (IRG N2447)", CJK & Unihan Group Recommendations for UTC #167 Meeting
14.0	U+2B738	1	L2/21-066			Moore, Lisa (2021-05-05), "Consensus 167-C3", UTC #167 Minutes
15.0	U+2B739	1	L2/22-042		N2543	Lunde, Ken (2022-02-18), Proposal to disunify U+5F50 into three separate ideographs-redux
15.0	U+2B739	1	L2/22-076		N2538R	Submission of One Character for Macao Supplementary Character Set (MSCS), 2022-02-28
15.0	U+2B739	1	L2/22-091			Chan, Eiso; Collins, Lee; Việt, Ngô Trung (2022-03-10), Vietnam Response to IRGN2509
15.0	U+2B739	1	L2/22-067			Lunde, Ken (2022-04-16), "18", CJK & Unihan Group Recommendations for UTC #171 Meeting
15.0	U+2B739	1	L2/22-061			Constable, Peter (2022-07-27), "E.1 Section 18", Approved Minutes of UTC Meeting 171
17.0	U+2B73A	1		N5259	N2676	Sim, CheonHyeong; Gao, Ziheng (2024-03-09), Proposal to Disunify U+5CC0
17.0	U+2B73A	1			N2671	"1.Disunifications and unifications", Editorial Report on Miscellaneous Issues, 2024-03-21
17.0	U+2B73A	1	L2/24-082	N5255	N2670	"Recommendation IRG M62.07", IRG Meeting #62 Recommendations and Action Items, 2024-03-22
17.0	U+2B73A	1	L2/24-138	N5254		"Recommendation M71.16", Recommendations from WG 2 meeting 71, 2024-06-14
17.0	U+2B73A	1	L2/24-165			Lunde, Ken (2024-07-11), "07", CJK & Unihan Working Group Recommendations for UTC #180 Meeting
17.0	U+2B73A	1	L2/24-159			Constable, Peter (2024-07-29), "Consensus 180-C2", UTC #180 Minutes, "Accept the disunification of U+5CC0"
17.0	U+2B73B	1			N2691	Yang, Tao; Chan, Eiso; Tan, Yuting (2024-05-08), UNC proposal for ethnic musical instruments of Yunnan Province
17.0	U+2B73B	1			N2702	Lunde, Ken (2024-10-24), "Recommendation IRG M63.13", IRG Meeting #63 Recommendations and Action Items
17.0	U+2B73B	1			N2704	"7. Urgently needed character (UNC) proposals", Editorial Report on Miscellaneous Issues, 2024-10-24
17.0	U+2B73B	1	L2/24-227R			Lunde, Ken (2024-10-30), "27", CJK & Unihan Working Group Recommendations for UTC #181 Meeting
17.0	U+2B73B	1	L2/24-221			Constable, Peter (2024-11-12), "Consensus 181-C28", UTC #181 Minutes, "Accept the urgently-needed G-source ideograph with code point U+2B73B"
17.0	U+2B73C..2B73D	2			N2709	UNC proposal for 2 TCA's UNC Characters, 2024-10-01
17.0	U+2B73C..2B73D	2			N2702	Lunde, Ken (2024-10-24), "Recommendation IRG M63.14", IRG Meeting #63 Recommendations and Action Items
17.0	U+2B73C..2B73D	2			N2704	"7. Urgently needed character (UNC) proposals", Editorial Report on Miscellaneous Issues, 2024-10-24
17.0	U+2B73C..2B73D	2	L2/24-227R			Lunde, Ken (2024-10-30), "28", CJK & Unihan Working Group Recommendations for UTC #181 Meeting
17.0	U+2B73C..2B73D	2	L2/24-221			Constable, Peter (2024-11-12), "E.1 Section 28", UTC #181 Minutes
17.0	U+2B73E	1			N2537	Sim, CheonHyeong (2022-01-11), "8. U+2335F", Disunification request for 8 characters
17.0	U+2B73E	1			N2730	Sim, CheonHyeong (2024-10-10), "U+2335F", Proposal to Disunify two Kangxi Charaers (Redux)
17.0	U+2B73E	1			N2702	Lunde, Ken (2024-10-24), "Recommendation M63.15", IRG Meeting #63 Recommendations and Action Items
17.0	U+2B73E	1			N2771	Disunification of U+2F980 and U+2335F, 2024-10-24
17.0	U+2B73E	1	L2/24-227R			Lunde, Ken (2024-10-30), "29", CJK & Unihan Working Group Recommendations for UTC #181 Meeting
17.0	U+2B73E	1	L2/24-221			Constable, Peter (2024-11-12), "Consensus 181-C30", UTC #181 Minutes, "Accept the disunification of U+2335F"
17.0	U+2B73F	1			N2782	Sim, CheonHyeong (2024-12-30), Proposal to Disunify U+6138
17.0	U+2B73F	1		N5297	N2765	Lunde, Ken (2025-03-21), "Recommendation IRG M64.07", IRG Meeting #64 Recommendations and Action Items
17.0	U+2B73F	1			N2767	"Proposal to Disunify U+6138", Editorial Report on Miscellaneous Issues, 2025-03-21
17.0	U+2B73F	1	L2/25-090			Lunde, Ken (2025-04-11), "27", CJK & Unihan Working Group Recommendations for UTC Meeting #183
17.0	U+2B73F	1	L2/25-085			Leroy, Robin (2025-04-28), "Consensus 183-C58", UTC #183 Minutes, "Accept the disunification of the KP-source of U+6138, along with the encoding of the disunified ideograph at code point U+2B73F"
