= Robison Wells =

American novelist (born 1978)

- Born: Robison Earl Wells; April 4, 1978 (age 48); Utah
- Education: University of Utah; Brigham Young University (MBA)
- Occupation: Author
- Writing career
- Period: 2004–present
- Genres: Science fiction, young adult
- Notable work: Variant
- Website: www.robisonwells.com

Robison Wells (born April 4, 1978) is an American novelist and blogger.

== Personal life ==
Robison Wells, the brother of author Dan Wells, was a reluctant reader as a child. He did not become interested in writing until he was in college. He graduated from the University of Utah in 2003 with a degree in political science, emphasizing in international relations, with a minor in history, and earned an MBA in marketing at Brigham Young University in 2009. Wells lives in North Salt Lake, Utah, with his wife and three children. He previously lived in New Mexico, which has been the setting for four of his novels. Wells is a practicing member of the Church of Jesus Christ of Latter-day Saints.

== Career ==
Robison Wells first began writing as part of a writing group with Dan Wells and Brandon Sanderson.

Wells's first three books were written for the LDS fiction market. The first, On Second Thought is a romantic comedy set in New Mexico, and the second two, Wake Me When It's Over and The Counterfeit are political thrillers.

In April 2010 it was announced that Wells had signed a 3-book young adult deal with HarperTeen. The first novel Variant is a young adult science fiction novel set in a boarding school in New Mexico. It has one sequel, Feedback; it is not a trilogy. Wells's third book with HarperTeen, Blackout was announced in Publisher's Marketplace as being the first of a series, including two novels and a novella, and was released in Fall 2013. The sequel, "Dead Zone" was released a year later. Wells's latest book with HarperTeen is titled Dark Energy.

Wells also indie-published a novel, Airships of Camelot. It was the product of a successful Kickstarter campaign. It is described as "alternate-history, steampunk, old West, King Arthur."

In 2019, Wells released a novel cowritten with James Patterson, titled The Warning. The book was a New York Times bestseller.

In 2020, Wells shifted his focus from writing novels to maintaining a popular wargame hobby website, The Wargame Explorer, which he ran for four years. He has stated he is working on a memoir about his experiences with mental illness, but it is not under contract.

== Critical reception ==
Variant was released to much critical acclaim, receiving starred reviews from Publishers Weekly and VOYA. It also received favorable reviews from Booklist and Kirkus. Publishers Weekly also named Variant as one of their Best Books of 2011, and featured Wells as one of their "Flying Starts".

Feedback has received mixed reviews. Kirkus referred to it as "An absorbing read that won't let fans of the first down", while Booklist said "the claustrophobic tightness of the first book is replaced here by a loose series of threats that never solidify into something worth rooting against."

The Warning was a New York Times bestseller for five weeks.

== The Whitney Awards ==
In the spring of 2007, Robison Wells began work on the Whitney Awards, an awards program for LDS fiction. He has stated that this idea came from a conversation with friend and fellow author Brandon Sanderson. The Whitney Awards are sponsored by Storymakers, an authors guild that holds an annual conference in May. Robison Wells served as president of the Whitney Awards Committee for three years, ending in 2010.

In 2018, Robison received the Outstanding Achievement Award from the Whitney Academy.

== Mental health ==
Wells has several mental illnesses, including OCD and schizophrenia, and is an outspoken advocate for those with mental illness. In 2014 Wells, joined by Brandon Sanderson and Dan Wells, edited Altered Perceptions, an anthology of essays from popular YA writers about their struggles with mental illness. He also contributed to the mental illness anthology Life Inside My Mind, with an essay called "Twenty Pills." He writes and speaks extensively about these topics.

After experiencing a rollover accident in May 2021, in which he had a major concussion, Wells has spoken openly about his experiences with grief counseling and therapy to work through feelings of guilt.

== Bibliography ==
- On Second Thought (2004), ISBN 1-59156-430-1
- Wake Me When It's Over (2005), ISBN 1-59156-721-1
- The Counterfeit (2006), ISBN 1-59811-116-7
- Variant (2011), ISBN 0-06-202608-9
- Feedback (2012), ISBN 0-06-202610-0
- Going Dark (Sept 2013)
- Blackout (Oct 2013)
- Dead Zone (Oct 2014)
- Altered Perceptions (Oct 2015) co-editor and cover artist
- Airships of Camelot (2015)
- Dark Energy (March 2016)
- Life Inside My Mind (April 2018) contributor
- The Warning (Aug 2019) co-written with James Patterson
- 21 Pills (June 2021) Non-fiction Essay
- The Dirty Half Dozen (April 2024) Game
