= Symphonic Variations =

Symphonic Variations may refer to:

- a musical composition consisting of a set of variations on a theme;
  - Symphonic Variations (1875) by Johann von Herbeck
  - Symphonic Variations on an Original Theme, Op. 78, B. 70 (1877) by Antonín Dvořák
  - Symphonic Variations for piano and orchestra (1885) by César Franck
  - Symphonic Variations (1897) by Hubert Parry
  - Symphonic Variations for piano and orchestra (1918) by Arnold Bax
  - Variations Symphoniques for Cello and Orchestra, Op.23 (1893) by Léon Boëllmann
  - Symphonic Variations (1931) by Mykola Kolessa
  - Symphonic Variations on a Theme of Girolamo Frescobaldi, Op. 20 (1935, rev. 1956, 1965) by Karl Höller
  - Symphonic Variations for Piano (1935–37) by Kaikhosru Shapurji Sorabji
    - Symphonic Variations for Piano and Orchestra (1935–37, 1953–56), Sorabji's orchestration of the first book of the three-volume Symphonic Variations for Piano, preceded by a newly composed "Introitus" for orchestra alone
  - Symphonic Variations (1936–38) by Witold Lutosławski
  - Symphonic Variations, Op. 25 (1940–41) by Gunnar de Frumerie
  - Symphonic Variations for Wind Orchestra (1977) by Bin Kaneda
  - Symphonic Variations on "In Dulci Jubilo" (1984) by Claude T. Smith
  - Symphonic Variations on "Amazing Grace" (1987) by Claude T. Smith
  - Symphonic Variations (1996) by Jacob de Haan
  - Symphonic Variations (2004) by Oliver Waespi
  - Symphonic Variations by Ismayil Hajiyev
  - Symphonic Variations on Chopin's Prelude in A, Op. 28/7 (subtitled From the Life of a Nation) by Zygmunt Noskowski
  - Symphonic Metamorphosis of Themes by Carl Maria von Weber (1943) by Paul Hindemith (sometimes also known as Symphonic Variations on Themes by Carl Maria von Weber)
- Symphonic Variations, a ballet choreographed by Frederick Ashton, based on the Franck piece

== See also ==
- Variations for Orchestra
- Variations on a Theme
- Variation (music)
