= Variation =

Variation or Variations may refer to:

== Science and mathematics ==
- Variation (astronomy), any perturbation of the mean motion or orbit of a planet or satellite, particularly of the moon
- Genetic variation, the difference in DNA among individuals or the differences between populations
  - Human genetic variation, genetic differences in and among populations of humans
- Magnetic variation, difference between magnetic north and true north, measured as an angle
- p-variation in mathematical analysis, a family of seminorms of functions
- Coefficient of variation in probability theory and statistics, a standardized measure of dispersion of a probability distribution or frequency distribution
- Total variation in mathematical analysis, a way of quantifying the change in a function over a subset of $\mathbb{R}^n$ or a measure space
- Calculus of variations in mathematical analysis, a method of finding maxima and minima of functionals

== Arts ==
- Variation (ballet) or pas seul, solo dance or dance figure
- Variations (ballet), a 1966 ballet by choreographer George Balanchine
- Variations (film), a 1998 short film by Nathaniel Dorsky
- Variations (journal), a journal of literature published by Peter Lang
- The Variations, a 2023 novel by Patrick Langley

=== Music ===
- Variation (music), a formal technique where material is altered during repetition
- Variations (Cage), a series of works by American avant-garde composer John Cage
- Variations (musical), 1982 Australian musical by Nick Enright and Terence Clarke
- Variations (Stravinsky), Igor Stravinsky's last orchestral composition written in 1963–64
- Variation (Hensoukyoku), album by Akina Nakamori
- Les Variations, a French rock group
- Variations (Andrew Lloyd Webber album), 1978
- Variations (Eddie Rabbitt album), 1978

== Other uses ==
- Variation (game), modifications made to a game by a community of players (as opposed to a central authority)
- Variation (game tree), a particular series of moves
- Variation (linguistics), a linguistic characteristic of languages
- Variation (horse), a British Thoroughbred
- Variation of the field, a concept in heraldry

== See also ==
- Variability (disambiguation)
- Change (disambiguation)
- Variations on a Theme (disambiguation)
- Rate of change (disambiguation)
- Repetition (disambiguation)
- Variant (disambiguation)
- Calculus of variations, a field of mathematics which deals with functions of functions
- Genetic diversity, total number of genetic characteristics in the genetic makeup of a species
- Variance, expectation of deviation in probability theory or statistics
