= Arkady (novel) =

2018 debut novel by Patrick Langley

- Author: Patrick Langley
- Language: English
- Publisher: Fitzcarraldo Editions
- Publication date: 2018
- Publication place: London
- Pages: 200 (first edition)
- ISBN: 978-1-910695-51-7

Arkady is the 2018 debut novel of Patrick Langley, a British author and art critic. The novel follows orphaned brothers Jackson and Frank as they attempt to navigate a dystopian version of England.

== Reception ==
The novel was longlisted for the inaugural Deborah Rogers Writers Award under its original title, The Brothers King, as well as the Ondaatje Prize of the Royal Society of Literature. A review in The Irish Times notes that "when Langley isn't painting elaborate tableaux, he is a brisk and engaging storyteller".
