= Variant (novel) =

2011 novel by Robison Wells

- First edition
- Author: Robison Wells
- Language: English
- Publisher: HarperTeen
- Publication date: October 4, 2011
- Publication place: United States
- Media type: Print (Hardback & e-book) and Audiobook
- Pages: 384 pp (first edition, hardback)
- ISBN: 0062026089 (second edition, hardback)
- Followed by: Feedback (novel)

Variant is a young adult suspense novel by Robison Wells. It was published on October 4, 2011, by HarperTeen. Wells has stated that the initial draft of Variant took him only eleven days to write. The book was named one of Publishers Weekly's "Best Books of 2011". A sequel, Feedback, was released in October 2012.

== Plot ==
Variant follows seventeen-year-old Benson Fisher, a foster kid who goes to Maxfield Academy on a scholarship. He hasn't stayed in one place for a long time and sees Maxfield as an opportunity to leave his past behind. When he arrives at school, two students chase the car he came in as it leaves campus. Benson's tour guide, Becky, tells him that the two students were breaking the cardinal rule of trying to leave school. Benson learns that Maxfield has no teachers, but the students govern themselves, with supervision from unknown people communicating via videos and messages. The students have broken themselves into factions: Society, Havoc, and Variant, the last of which Benson joins.

== Reception ==
Critical reception for Variant was positive, with Kirkus Reviews praising the book's first person narrative. Publishers Weekly wrote that the book was "fast paced" and had a "clever premise." Voice of Youth Advocates stated that the book was "an exciting, edge-of-your-seat read" that "should join the ranks of today’s must-read science fiction and fantasy series." Booklist called Variant a "good old-fashioned paranoia taken to giddy extremes."

Fangoria gave the book two out of four skulls, saying "As much as I’m sure getting splattered by a 6 mm water soluble paint-pellet would sting to the high heavens, it doesn’t seem to carry the template of threat that The Hunger Games has already laid down for all other books to haplessly follow." The reviewer ended the review with "Once readers reach its subsequent sequels, those paint pellets may just end up being replaced with something a little more lethal—and original."

== Awards ==
2011 Publishers Weekly Best Books of 2011

2011 Association for Mormon Letters Award for Best Young Adult Novel—WON

2011 Whitney Award for Best Youth Speculative Fiction—WON

2012-2013 Utah Beehive Awards for Young Adult—NOMINEE

2013 Missouri Truman Awards—NOMINEE

2013 South Carolina Young Adult Book Awards—NOMINEE
