= Varyant =

Avenue in İzmir, Turkey

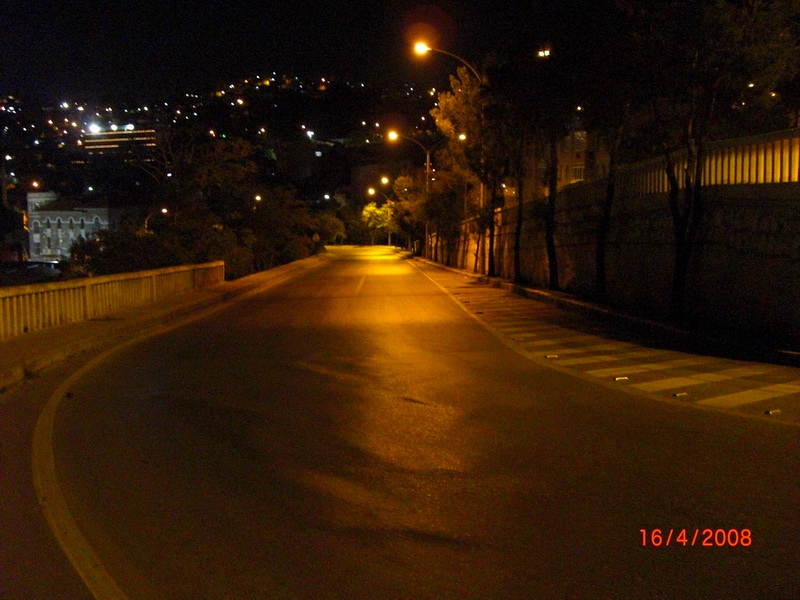
Varyant at night.

Varyant is the more widely known name for the United Nations Avenue (Turkish: Birleşmiş Milletler Caddesi), an avenue in İzmir, Turkey that is well known for its winding route and vista of the city. The road connects Halil Rıfat Paşa Avenue in central Konak to İnönü Avenue in Eşrefpaşa. The avenue was originally built as a two-way street, but the northern half was converted to a one way street, when Halil Rıfat Paşa Avenue was extended down to Bahribaba in Konak. Traffic heading up the hill use Varyant, while traffic heading down use Halil Rıfat Paşa Avenue. At the midpoint of the route, United Nations Avenue becomes a two-way street until its southern end at İnönü Avenue.

== Overview ==
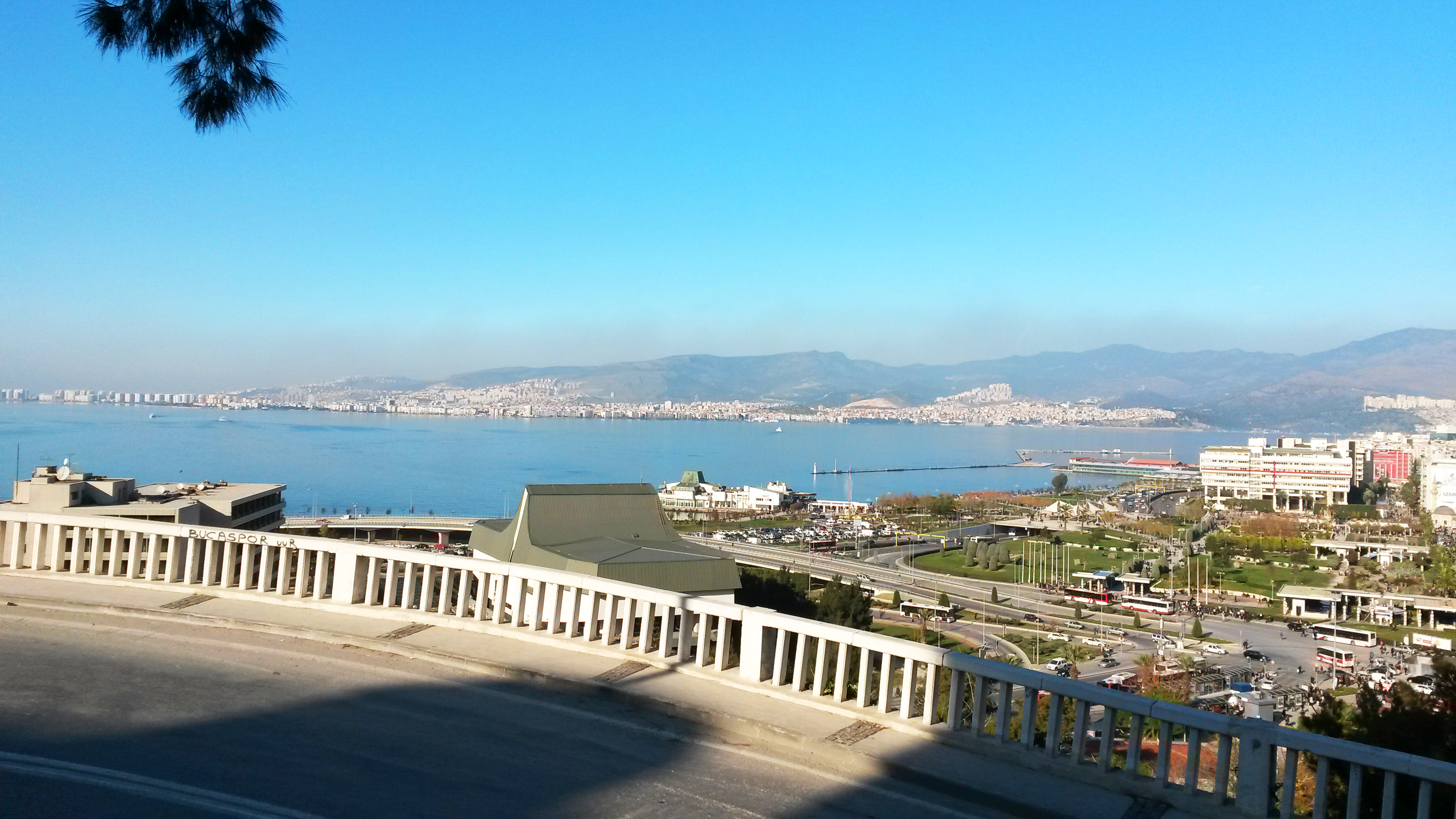
The vista of the city from Varyant.

Construction of Varyant began on 1 December 1950. The route was originally built on several viaducts to help traverse the steep terrain. The land under these viaducts have since been filled up, leaving only the concrete barriers in place. A section of one viaduct, at the intersection with Halil Rıfat Paşa Avenue, can still be seen from Konak. The road was originally named Vali Rahmi Bey Avenue but was soon changed to United Nations Avenue, in honor of the newly formed world organization. The section of road to Halil Rıfat Paşa Avenue was opened on 25 March 1952. The section of road to İnönü Avenue was opened within the next year or two; the exact date is not clear.

The route was built with a 7° incline, a total width of 13 m (43 ft) and consists of six sharp curves. The total length of United Nations Avenue is 1.45 km (0.90 mi) and the difference in elevation is 67.1 m (220 ft).

The route begins in central Konak, splitting off from Halil Rıfat Paşa Avenue, near the western portal of the Konak Tunnel. This section is of the route is for southbound (uphill) traffic only, as Halil Rıfat Paşa Avenue runs parallel for northbound (downhill) traffic. United Nations Avenue winds around the İzmir Ethnography Museum until reaching its halfway point on the last visible viaduct at a height of 49.3 m (162 ft) above sea-level. Halil Rıfat Paşa Avenue intersects with United Nations Avenue and continues west to Halil Rıfat Paşa. South of the intersection, Varyant becomes a two-way avenue and continues south to İnönü Avenue. The route winds around two more sharp curves until reaching İnönü Avenue at the Bayramyeri intersection.

ESHOT city buses use Varyant for bus routes from Konak to Buca and Karabağlar. Articulated buses are too big for the sharp curves, thus mainly midibuses and some single-deck buses run along United Nations Avenue.
