= Variations on a Theme Publishing =

American publishing company

Variations on a Theme - Private Label Publishing aka Variations on a Theme LLC, is a publishing company in Ramsey, Minnesota (near Minneapolis), which concentrates on making publisher-selected previously published works available in electronic or print formats. Authors are paid royalties after setup costs earn-out. Writers currently contributing content include Grant Carrington, Robert James, C. Sanford Lowe, G. David Nordley, and D. H. Rule. Categories of work published as of 2013 include history, popular culture, and science fiction.
