= Repetition =

Repetition may refer to:

- Repetition (rhetorical device), repeating a word within a short space of words
- Repetition (bodybuilding), a single cycle of lifting and lowering a weight in strength training
- Working title for the 1985 slasher film Friday the 13th: A New Beginning

== Books ==
- Repetition (Kierkegaard book), a book by the Danish philosopher Søren Kierkegaard published in 1843
- Repetition (Handke novel), a 1986 novel by the Austrian writer Peter Handke
- Repetition (Robbe-Grillet novel), translation of La reprise, a 2001 novel by Alain Robbe-Grillet

== Music ==
- Repetition (band), an English post-punk band formed in 1979
- Repetition (music), the use of repetition in musical compositions

=== Albums ===
- Repetition (Unwound album), a 1996 album by Unwound
- Repetition (Clifford Jordan album), a 1984 album by Clifford Jordan

=== Songs ===
- "Repetition" (David Bowie song), a song by David Bowie on his 1979 album Lodger
- "Repetition" (Information Society song), 1989
- "Repetition" (DD Smash song), 1981
- "Repetition", a song by Blur from their 1991 album Leisure
- "Repetition", a song by Helmet from their 1990 album Strap It On
- "Repetition", a song by Quasi from their 1998 album Featuring "Birds"
- "Repetition", a song by The Fall from their 1978 EP Bingo-Master's Break-Out!
- "Repetition", a song by Ride from their 2019 album This Is Not a Safe Place

== See also ==
- Repeat (disambiguation)
- Variation (disambiguation)
- Repetitive nerve stimulation, a type of nerve conduction study
- Sennichite or repetition draw, a rule in shogi
