= Variability =

Variability is how spread out or closely clustered a set of data is.

Variability may refer to:

== Biology ==
- Genetic variability, a measure of the tendency of individual genotypes in a population to vary from one another
- Heart rate variability, a physiological phenomenon where the time interval between heart beats varies
- Human variability, the range of possible values for any measurable characteristic, physical or mental, of human beings

== Other sciences ==
- Climate variability, changes in the components of Earth's climate system and their interactions
- Spatial variability, when a quantity that is measured at different spatial locations exhibits values that differ across the locations
- Statistical variability, a measure of dispersion in statistics

== See also ==
- Variability hypothesis, nineteenth century hypothesis that males have a greater range of ability than females
- Variable (disambiguation)
- Variable renewable energy, a renewable energy source of a fluctuating nature
- Variance, a specific measure of statistical dispersion
- Variation (disambiguation)
