= Piano Variations (Copland) =

Composition for piano solo by American composer Aaron Copland

The Piano Variations of American composer Aaron Copland were written for piano solo from January to October 1930. They were dedicated to American writer and literary critic Gerald Sykes (c. 1904–1984), and were originally published in 1932 by Cos Cob Press, which merged with Arrow Music Press in 1938 and was taken over by Boosey & Hawkes in 1956. The approximate performance time is 11 minutes.

== Background ==
The Piano Variations were a product of Copland's second-style period, also called the abstract period, which consisted only of instrumental (non-vocal) compositions. During this time, the composer moved away from the jazzy idioms he experimented with in the 1920s and started working more in the direction of absolute music. The influence of composition pedagogue Nadia Boulanger, with whom Copland studied in Paris at the Fontainebleau School of Music for Americans, is prevalent in the formal style, logic, patterns, and attention to detail in the Piano Variations and other works in this period.

Copland stated that he worked on the variations individually without an agenda for fitting them together or sequencing them, which seems to contradict the piece's highly ordered construction and seemingly inevitable development. Copland acknowledged this contradiction but maintained that, in fact, "One fine day when the time was right, the order of the variations fell into place." Copland had ambitious plans for this "serious piano piece"—the first of three including the Piano Variations (1930), the Piano Sonata (1939–41), and the Piano Fantasy (1957); he worked painstakingly and thought at epic proportions, saying he "should like to call them like Bach did the Goldberg Variations—but thus far haven't been able to think up a good one."

== Transcription as Orchestral Variations (1957) ==
Copland transcribed the Piano Variations for orchestra in 1957 after a commission from the Louisville Orchestra. These Orchestral Variations were premiered the following year, conducted by Robert Whitney. Copland regarded the "lean, percussive and rather harmonically severe" quality of the piano as essential to the Piano Variations in 1930, but after 27 years, reinvented the work to take advantage of a full orchestral palette. The Orchestral Variations offer a new perspective on the work, focusing instead on the contrasts of its multifarious moods and colors.

The Orchestral Variations are scored for the following instrumentation.

Woodwinds
2 flutes (both doubling piccolo)
Oboe
English horn
2 B-flat clarinets (2nd doubling bass clarinet)
2 bassoons
Brass
4 horns in F
2 trumpets in B-flat
3 trombones
Tuba
Harp
Strings

Percussion
Timpani

2 Percussionists playing:

Snare drum
Tenor drum
Bass drum
Bongo drums
Conga
Cymbals
Tam-tam
Wood block
Glockenspiel
Xylophone
Tubular bells
Antique cymbals
Cowbell

== Reception ==
Copland regarded pianist Walter Gieseking very highly for his refined tone and subtle coloration, especially in the performance of Debussy, and insisted that no one else could give a satisfactory premiere of his masterpiece. Unfortunately, Gieseking (who had performed in the premiere of the piano trio Vitebsk in New York in 1929) turned down Copland's request for a premiere due to the piece's "crude dissonances" and "severity of style". Copland thus premiered the piece himself at a League of Composers Concert in New York on January 4, 1931.

The Piano Variations were praised in some esoteric circles, but the public was generally courteous but lukewarm in its reception. The work was variously described as new, strange, dissonant, stark, bare, and disconcerting. Critic Paul Rosenfeld contemplated its "flinty, metallic sonorities." American composer Marc Blitzstein called it "Lithic." The cold, hard tone of Copland's playing at the premiere, far from that of a concert pianist, lent a sharper edge to an already austere work. Leonard Bernstein later reported that he adored the piece, which was "hard as nails", and also used it at parties to "empty the room, guaranteed, in two minutes". It was to him a "synonym for modern music—so prophetic, harsh and wonderful, and so full of modern feeling and thinking".

Despite the wide spectrum of opinion, the Piano Variations were immediately recognized for their originality and made a lasting impression. The New York Herald Tribune reported that, in the piece, Copland "sardonically thumbed his nose at all those esthetic attributes which have hitherto been considered essential to the creation of music".

Dancer-choreographer Martha Graham requested permission to choreograph a solo piece on the Piano Variations. With Copland's consent, she produced Dithyrambic, an evocation of Dionysus that was received with the highest enthusiasm. Copland admitted to being "utterly astonished that anyone could consider this kind of music suitable for dance ... although her choreography was considered as complex and abstruse as my music".

== The Variations ==
=== Overview ===
Unlike a traditional theme and variations, Copland's Piano Variations are not episodic. They are continuously played through, in an undisrupted development of the seven-note "row" in the theme from which Copland builds the rest of the piece, "in what I hope is a consistently logical way". All of the content can be traced back to this or transpositions of this seven-note motif, suggesting the serialist techniques of Schoenberg. The concision, rigor, and lack of ornamentation have been compared to that of the style of Anton Webern. The dissonances (ubiquitous minor seconds, major sevenths and ninths) are precisely chosen for their degree of "shock value". While working on the Piano Variations, Copland cultivated a tautness and clarity of form and texture that became a precursor to the style of his other works.

Copland also experimented with the potential of the physical instrument, as he did with microtones on the stringed instruments in Vitebsk (1929). In the Piano Variations, some notes are held down silently while pitches selected from their overtone series are struck, which produces an effect of ringing resonances without hammering the tones directly.

Another prominent characteristic is the piece's rhythmic irregularity. The meters change constantly within an essentially 4/4 framework.
