= LeUyen Pham =

Children's book illustrator and author

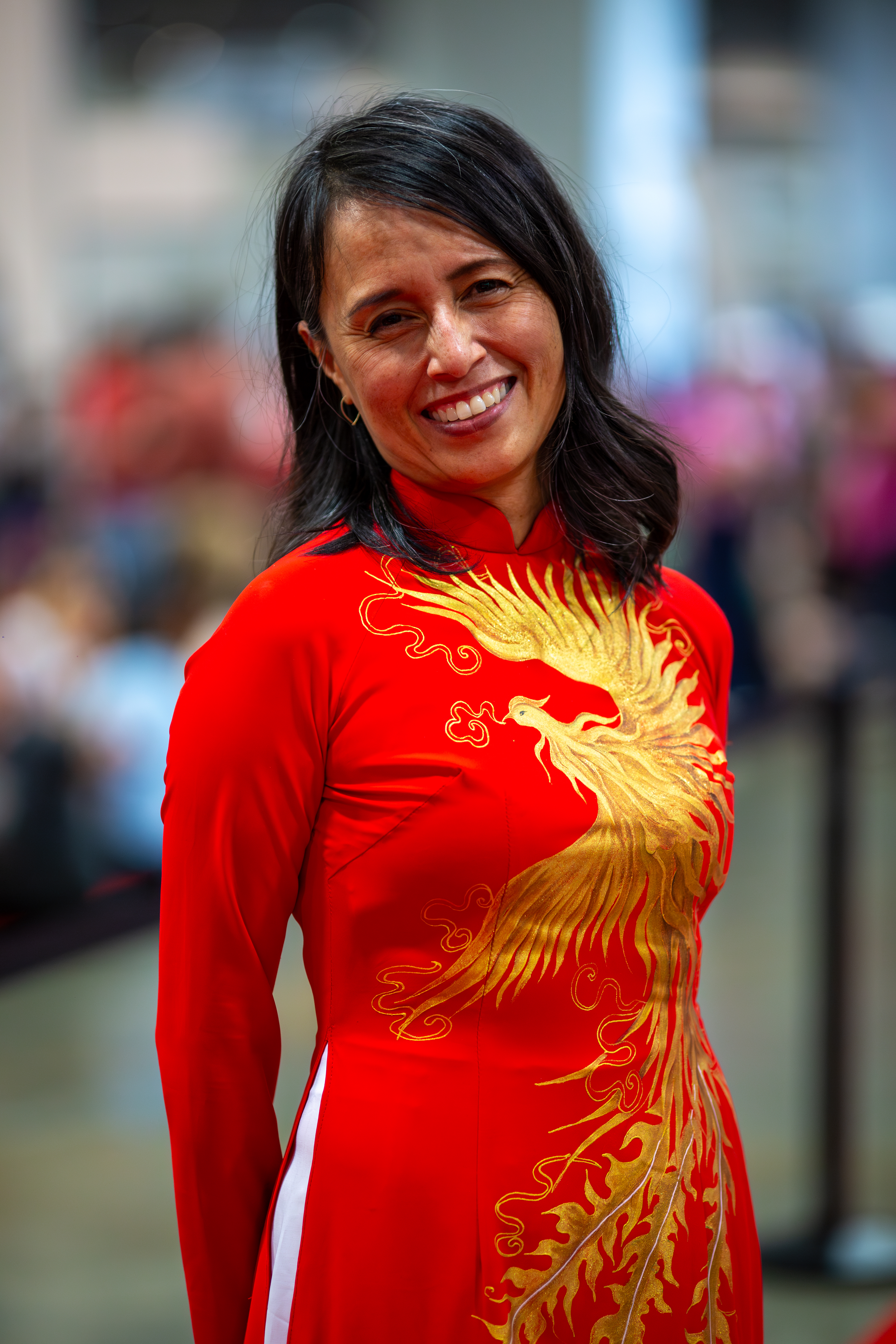
- Pham at the 2024 National Book Festival
- Born: September 6, 1973 (age 53); Saigon, South Vietnam
- Education: Art Center College of Design
- Occupations: Author and illustrator
- Spouse: Alexandre Puvilland (2005–present)
- Writing career
- Genre: Children's books
- Notable awards: Caldecott Honor (2020)

LeUyen Pham (born September 6, 1973) is a children's book illustrator and author. She has illustrated and written more than 120 books. In 2020, she won a Caldecott Honor for her illustrations in the book Bear Came Along.

== Biography ==
Pham was born in Saigon, South Vietnam on September 7, 1973. She attended the University of California, Los Angeles from 1991 to 1993, and graduated with a Bachelor of Arts in 1996 from the Art Center College of Design. After graduation, she worked as a layout artist at DreamWorks Animation from 1996 to 1999. She then quit to illustrate children's books full-time.

Pham's first illustrated book, Sugarcane House, and Other Stories about Mr. Fat, was written by Adrienne Moore Bond and published in 1997. In 2000, the book Can You Do This, Old Badger? was published, with illustrations by Pham and writing by Eve Bunting. The book won an Oppenheim Toy Portfolio Gold Award. In 2004, the book Twenty-One Elephants, illustrated by Pham and written by Phil Bildner, also won an Oppenheim Toy Portfolio Gold Award.

Pham's writing debut was in 2005 with her children's book Big Sister, Little Sister. The book is narrated by a younger girl who compares herself to her older sister, with their sibling affection showing more as the story progresses. It contains ink brush illustrations and additions of digitally-produced color. The book received positive reviews, with Linda Ludke in the School Library Journal commenting that “with warmth and good humor, the ups and downs of sisterly love are perfectly conveyed.”

Pham is the illustrator of the Princess in Black children's book series. The series is written by Shannon Hale and Dean Hale, with the first book published in 2014. In their The Princess in Black book review, Publishers Weekly said Pham “offers little jolts of energy and wit on every page, with full-page and spot illustrations that have the vivaciousness and irreverence of contemporary animation.”

Pham co-created the graphic novels Real Friends and Best Friends with author Shannon Hale. In 2020, she was awarded a Caldecott Honor for her illustrations in the book Bear Came Along.

In April 2020, Pham, Shannon Hale and Dean Hale released a short, free ebook called The Princess in Black and the Case of the Coronavirus to share tips on fighting COVID-19 in an understandable way for children. In 2020, Pham illustrated a book with Shannon Hale called Itty-Bitty Kitty-Corn, which was published in March 2021.

Through her collaborations with Hale, Pham has been shortlisted for four AML Awards. She won one, for Real Friends, and received an honorable mention for the first Princess in Black book. She is perhaps the only person unassociated with the Latter-day Saint faith to receive such recognition.

In 2026, Pham was a recipient of the Inkpot Award at the annual San Diego Comic Con.

== Personal life ==
On October 29, 2005, Pham married artist Alexandre Puvilland.

== Selected works ==
=== Standalone books ===
- Can You Do This, Old Badger? (2000) illustrator; written by Eve Bunting
- Whose Shoes? (2001) illustrator; written by Anna Grossnickle Hines
- Piggies in a Polka (2003) – illustrator; written by Kathi Appelt
- Twenty-One Elephants (2004) – illustrator; written by Phil Bildner
- Sing-Along Song (2004) – illustrator; written by JoAnn Early Macken
- Big Sister, Little Sister (2005) – author & illustrator
- Hanukkah, Shmanukkah! (2005) – illustrator; written by Esmé Raji Codell
- Grace for President (2008) – illustrator; Written by Kelly DiPucchio
- God's Dream (2008) – illustrator; Written by Archbishop Desmond Tutu and Douglas Carlton Abrams
- Templar (2013) – co-illustrator; Written by Jordan Mechner
- The Boy Who Loved Math (2013) – illustrator; Written by Deborah Heiligman
- Bo at Ballard Creek (2013) – illustrator; Written by Kirkpatrick Hill
- The Bear Who Wasn't There (2016) – author & illustrator
- Isabella For Real (2016) – author; Written by Margie Palatini
- Bear Came Along (2019) – illustrator; written by Richard T. Morris, winner of the Caldecott Honor Award
- Grace Goes to Washington (2019) – illustrator; Written by Kelly DePucchio
- Love is Powerful (2020) – illustrator; written by Heather Dean Brewer
- Outside Inside (2021) – Author & Illustrator
- Lunar New Year Love Story (2024) - illustrator; written by Gene Luen Yang

=== Freckleface Strawberry Series ===
Illustrated by Pham and written by Julianne Moore

- Freckleface Strawberry (2007)
- Freckleface Strawberry and the Dodgeball Bully (2009)
- Freckleface Strawberry: Best Friends Forever (2011)
- Freckleface Strawberry: Loose Tooth! (2016)

=== Princess in Black series ===
Illustrated by Pham and written by Shannon Hale and Dean Hale

- The Princess in Black (2014)
- The Princess in Black and the Perfect Princess Party (2015)
- The Princess in Black and the Hungry Bunny Horde (2016)
- The Princess in Black Takes a Vacation (2016)
- The Princess in Black and the Mysterious Playdate (2016)
- The Princess in Black and the Science Fair Scare (2018)
- The Princess in Black and the Bathtime Battle (2019)
- The Princess in Black and the Giant Problem (2020)
- The Princess in Black and the Mermaid Princess (2022)
- The Princess in Black and the Prince in Pink (2023)

=== Real Friends series ===
Co-created by Pham and Shannon Hale

- Real Friends (2017)
- Best Friends (2019)
- Friends Forever (2021)

=== Vampirina Ballerina series ===
Illustrated by Pham and written by Anne Marie Pace

- Vampirina Ballerina (2012)
- Vampirina Ballerina Hosts a Sleepover (2013)
- Vampirina at the Beach (2017)
- Vampirina in the Snow (2018)

=== Alvin Ho series ===
Illustrated by Pham and written by Lenore Look

- Alvin Ho: Allergic to Girls, School, and Other Scary Things (2009)
- Alvin Ho: Allergic to Camping, Hiking, and Other Natural Disasters (2010)
- Alvin Ho: Allergic to Birthday Parties, Science Projects, and Other Man-made Catastrophes (2011)
- Alvin Ho: Allergic to Dead Bodies, Funerals, and Other Fatal Circumstances (2012)
- Alvin Ho: Allergic to Babies, Burglars, and Other Bumps in the Night (2014)
- Alvin Ho: Allergic to the Great Wall, the Forbidden Palace, and Other Tourist Attractions (2015)

=== Itty-Bitty Kitty-Corn series ===
Illustrated by Pham and written by Shannon Hale

- Itty-Bitty Kitty-Corn (2021), ISBN 978-1-4197-5091-5
- Pretty Perfect Kitty-Corn (2022), ISBN 978-1-4197-5093-9
- Party Hearty Kitty-Corn (2023), ISBN 978-1-4197-5095-3
