= Book of a Thousand Days =

2007 young adult fantasy novel by Shannon Hale

The Book of a Thousand Days
- Book of a Thousand Days' first U.S. edition cover
- Author: Shannon Hale
- Language: English
- Genre: Young adult, Fantasy
- Publisher: Bloomsbury
- Publication date: 2007
- Publication place: United States
- Media type: Print (hardback & paperback)
- Pages: 336p
- ISBN: 1-59990-051-3
- OCLC: 78770995
- LC Class: PZ7.H13824 Boo 2007

Book of a Thousand Days is a 2007 young adult fantasy novel by Shannon Hale. It is based on the Brothers Grimm fairy tale Maid Maleen.

== Plot summary ==
Dashti, a mucker from steppes of the Eight Realms, begins a diary as she looks for a job after her mother dies of illness. Eventually, she finds and accepts a position as the new maid of Lady Saren, the youngest child of the lord of Titor's Garden. Saren has defied her father's declaration that she will marry Lord Khasar of Thoughts of Under and revealed that she is engaged to the young Khan Tegus of Song for Evela. To tame his daughter, Saren's father shuts her and Dashti, the only maid willing to accompany Saren, in a tower far away from his city and surrounded by guards. He claims he will only release them after seven years, or if Saren will relent and marry Khasar.

While isolated from the rest of the world, Dashti realizes the fragility of Saren's mind and heart and does her best to soothe Saren through stories and songs. When Khan Tegus visits them, Saren unexpectedly refuses to speak with him and orders Dashti to impersonate her. As Tegus cannot see into the tower, Dashti reluctantly agrees and a friendship develops between them when he returns for several more visits, including one where he gives Saren a cat whom Dashti names "My Lord." However, Lord Khasar also arrives at the tower and begins harassing them, performing cruel acts to torture and upset them. The guards around the tower fail to respond to the girls' cries and My Lord disappears from the tower during a night when they hear the howls of a wolf, causing the rats to infest the tower. Khasar's appearances cause Saren to become withdrawn from deep-seated fear, in spite of Dashti's efforts. As their food storages dwindle, Dashti finds a weakened portion of the tower where the rats have entered and breaks through the wall to freedom.

Once out, they discover that Titor's Garden has been destroyed and they discover that Khasar has been waging war across the Eight Realms. Together, they travel to Song for Evela, which has remained untouched by Khasar so far, and Dashti finds them jobs as scrubbers in the kitchens of Khan Tegus. Though Dashti continues to sing healing songs to calm and soothe her, Saren's condition does not improve, and she refuses to reveal her identity to Khan Tegus. When it is revealed that Dashti can sing songs of healing, she is hired to take care of and heal Tegus, and the two slowly fall in love.

While Dashti thrives as a servant, Saren grows increasingly resentful and unhappy, especially when My Lord finds them again. Dashti returns the cat to Saren, who begins to grow more confident in herself through the cat's unconditional love. As Khasar begins to approach Song for Evela, Tegus agrees to a betrothal to Lady Vachir, the ruling lady of the realm Beloved of Ris, in order to save the remaining realms. Desperate to save the realms, Dashti tries to persuade Saren to reveal herself, but her fear overwhelms her. She orders Dashti to impersonate her again, and for once Dashti is stalwart in her refusal. However, when Khasar threatens to level the city unless they give up Lady Saren, Dashti relents and presents herself as Lady Saren to Tegus and his ministers, thinking to protect her lady.

Dashti finally coaxes Saren to speak of her previous traumatic meeting with Khasar, allowing Dashti to form a plan to defeat him. She risks herself before Khasar's armies, using her song to reveal his true nature: he is actually a skin-changer who becomes a wolf. Khasar's armies turn against him, and he is killed. Dashti returns to the palace, prepared to leave after uniting Saren and Tegus despite her own feelings for him, but is exposed as a mucker by the vindictive Lady Vachir after she steals Dashti's diary. Saren finds the courage to stand up for herself and saves Dashti with help and encouragement from Tegus. Dashti and Tegus marry.

== Characters ==
Dashti

The narrator and the writer of the "Book of a Thousand Days", fifteen-year-old Dashti leaves the plains where she was raised to find work in a nearby city after her mother dies. As a person from the plains, she is looked down on as a "mucker", a low-class citizen, by nobility. However, she accepts the role of becoming the lady's maid of Lady Saren, abiding by her oath of service to follow Saren even as she is imprisoned for seven years in a tower. Describing herself as thin, with skinny ankles, worn-out hands, long black hair, and with birth marks, or what she calls "blotches" on her face and hands, Dashti is revealed to be a resilient and resourceful young woman. The strength of her will and spirit allows her and Saren to survive in the tower and go on living after their escape, and Dashti's knowledge of songs of healing soothe the damaged spirits of those close to her. She is deathly loyal to Lady Saren, seeing it as her duty to her ancestors and the gods she worships.

Lady Saren

Sixteen-year-old Saren is the third child of the ruler of Titor's Garden, who regarded her as a worthless and ugly brat. Her unusually vehement refusal to marry Lord Khasar, claiming that she is betrothed to Khan Tegus, results in her imprisonment in a tower with only one maid for company for the next seven years. Dashti astutely perceives that Saren's lack of self-esteem and nervous disposition are the results of a deep-rooted sickness within Saren's heart and gradually helps her heal. Though she is initially afraid of everything and easily jealous, she comes to trust Dashti as a true friend.

Khan Tegus

The ruler of the Song of Evela, one of the Eight Realms. A suitor of Lady Saren, he bravely visits her in the tower where she is imprisoned, though because of Saren's fright, Dashti impersonates her to convey what she believes as Saren's feelings for the Khan. When his visits abruptly cease and Dashti and Saren escape the tower, the two young women manage to find their way to the Song of Evela, with Dashti hoping to reunite Saren and Tegus. However, Tegus and Dashti eventually fall in love.

Lord Khasar

The brutal ruler of the Thoughts of Under, who demanded Saren as a bride. A powerful warlord seeking to conquer the Eight Realms, he possesses a terrifying secret that Saren learned and has fearfully kept hidden.

Lady Vachir

The ruler of Beloved of Ris who becomes engaged to Khan Tegus when he believed that Saren had perished with the destruction of Titor's Garden. A haughty and vicious woman.

My Lord

Dashti and Saren's cat, given to them by Khan Tegus in the tower. Initially he prefers Dashti, but Dashti later gifts him to Saren, which helps Saren to heal from her trauma.

Mucker

Dashti's yak, whom she finds after she escapes the tower that's in Titor's Garden. Dashti gifts him to Khan Tegus, which later plays an important role in her exoneration.

Batu

Khan Tegus's chief of war. He is healed by Dashti's songs from a mortal wound, and he later aids her in defeating Khasar.

Chinua

Lord Khasar's chief of war, and the only one besides Saren who know his secret. He tries to protect Khasar after he turns into a wolf, but ultimately fails.

Shria

A worker in Khan Tegus's home of some rank. She offers Dashti and Saren jobs in the Khan's kitchen after Dashti's appearance in the city.

Qacha

A fellow scrubber girl in Khan Tegus's home. She is a mucker like Dashti.

Gal

A fellow scrubber girl in Khan Tegus's home. Her reunion with her family against all odds gives Dashti hope while imprisoned.

== Themes ==
Friendship and Love Dashti is a very honest yet humorous character. Throughout the novel she is motivated by her love for her mother to reach out and help others. When she first meets Lady Saren, who lies and weeps on her bed, she does not judge her, but looks for the good qualities in her. Through Dashti's patience and perseverance, she develops a friendship with Saren. At some points, Dashti does not tell Saren certain things, for fear it might further aggravate Saren's fragile mental state. Dashti even risks her life by posing as Saren and taking a stand against Lord Khasar. Dashti's friendship of Saren eventually turns the events at the end of the novel, in which Saren declares that Dashti is her sister. Friendship is also evident in the relationship between Dashti and Khan Tegus. When Dashti, posing as Lady Saren, talks to him at the tower, they joke and laugh. They create a friendship that eventually turns into a romantic love. When things take a bad turn at the end, Khan Tegus finds every way possible to marry Dashti, and after he and Saren convince the chiefs Dashti is innocent, friendship and love win in the end.

Loyalty and Trust Dashti is loyal to Saren, yet she confides and puts all of her true thoughts into her journal, the book that the reader holds. It is in this journal we learn of Dashti's true emotions and thoughts towards the world around her. However honest her thoughts are, she is still loyal to Lady Saren on the outside. By the end of the book, Saren trusts Dashti. Tegus struggles with trusting Dashti after he finds out who she really is. But because of her loyalty to him, he finds his loyalty in her and rescues her.

Time The title itself is an acknowledgment to this theme. Dashti mentions many times that things will turn out right with time, or that Saren will be healed with time. Dashti doesn't seem to mind being locked seven years in a tower until she realizes Saren's true character. Throughout all of this, she exhibits extreme patience. When she risks herself against Lord Khasar at the end, she plays with time in revealing his true character as a wolf. Standing naked before him is almost a way to spite the way he stood naked before Lady Saren and revealed who he really was, thus bring up the past. Tegus also brings up the past with Dashti, reminiscing on how far they've come.

== Literary significance and reception ==
The novel has generally received positive reviews. Kirkus review said, "Dashti’s voice is bright and true; Hale captures her sturdy personality, Saren’s mental fragility and Khan Tegus’s romantic warrior as vibrantly as she limns the stark terror of the Mongolian cold and the ugly spirit from which Khasar draws his strength." Publishers Weekly in giving it a star review wrote "Hale (River Secrets ) delivers another winning fantasy, this time inventively fleshing out the obscure Grimm tale, Maid Maleen..." and "Readers will be riveted as Dashti and Saren escape and flee to the Khan's realm where, through a series of deceptions, contrivances and a riotously triumphant climax, the tale spins out to a thoroughly satisfying ending."

== Awards and nominations ==
- Best Speculative Fiction 2007, Whitney Awards
- Fantasy and Science Fiction 2007, Cybils Awards
- Young Adult Fantasy Novel 2008 Cybils Awards
- Book Sense Pick for Fall 2007
- ALA Best Book for Young Adults 2008
- Oprah's Book Club Kids Reading List selection
- Junior Library Guild Selection
- Chicago Public Library Best of the Best Books
- Teenreads.com Best Book
- SLJ Best Book of the Year School Library Journal
- Booklist "Top Ten" Youth Fantasy

== Publication history ==
- 2007, Bloomsbury USA Children's Books ISBN 1-59990-051-3, Pub date 18 September 2007, Hardback
