= Maid Maleen =

German fairy tale

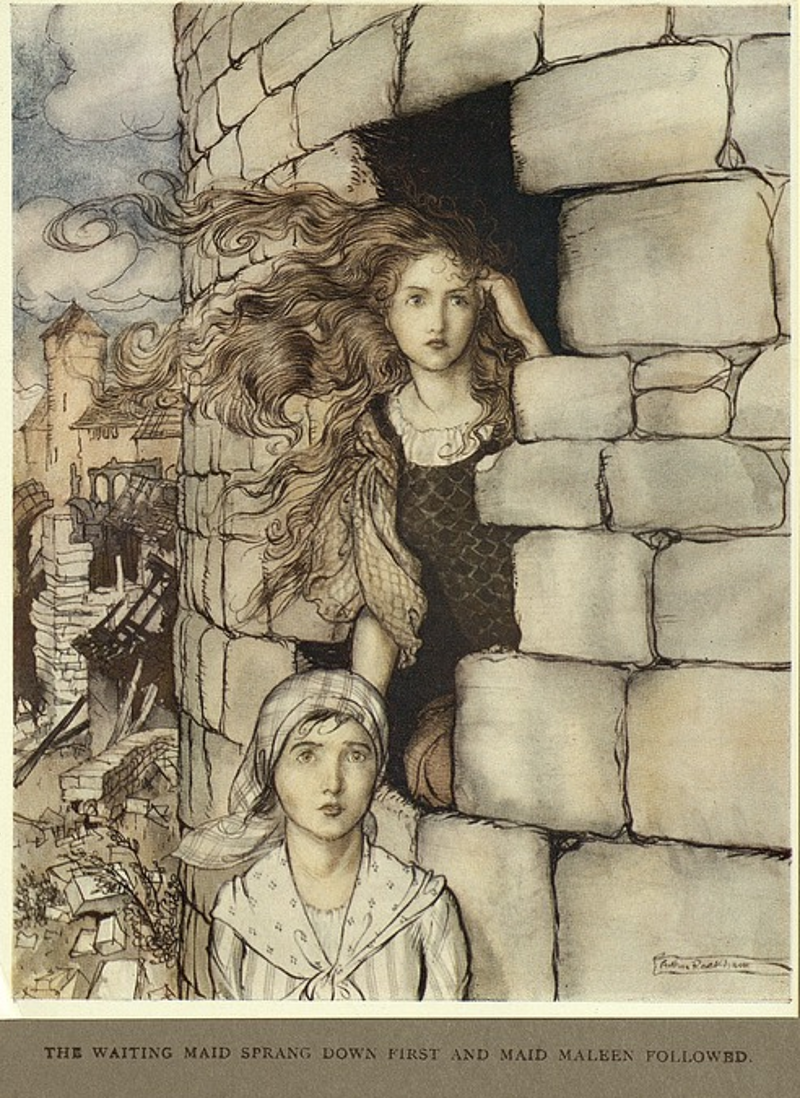
- Arthur Rackham, 1917

Folk tale
- Name: Maid Maleen
- Aarne–Thompson grouping: ATU 870
- Country: Germany
- Published in: Grimms' Fairy Tales

"Maid Maleen" (German: Jungfrau Maleen) is a German fairy tale collected by the Brothers Grimm, number 198.

It is Aarne–Thompson type 870, "The Princess Confined in the Mound."

== Sources ==
The tale was originally published by author Karl Mullenhoff with the title Jungfer Maleen, in the fourth book of his compilation of German legends and folktales.

== Synopsis ==
Once there was a princess named Maid Maleen who fell in love with a prince, but her father refused his suit. When Maid Maleen said she would marry no other, the king had her and her maidservant locked up in a tower, with food that would be enough to feed them for seven years.

After seven long years, the food eventually ran out, but no one came to release them or deliver more food. The princess and her maidservant then decided to escape from the tower using a simple knife. When they finally managed to break free of the tower, they found the kingdom destroyed and the king long gone from since. Without knowing where to go, they finally arrived at the country of Maleen's lover, and sought work in the royal kitchen.

Since Maleen's imprisonment, the prince had been betrothed by his father to another princess. This princess, lacking of confidence in herself, did not think that she would be good enough for the prince. Thus, she would not leave her room and let him see her. On her wedding day, not wishing to be seen, the princess sent Maid Maleen in her place.

At the wedding, the prince put a golden necklace around Maid Maleen's neck as proof of their marriage. Later that night, the prince went to the wedding chamber where the princess was waiting, but he did not see the golden necklace around her neck. Immediately, he knew that the princess was not the one he was married to. Meanwhile, the princess had sent out an assassin to kill Maid Maleen. The prince, who left the wedding chamber to look for his true bride, was guided by the shine of the golden necklace and came in time to save her. With the golden necklace as the proof of marriage, they were married, the princess was executed for her wickedness and the prince and Maleen lived happily ever after with laughter in their hearts.

== Analysis ==
=== Tale type ===
The tale is classified in the Aarne-Thompson-Uther Index as tale type ATU 870, "The Princess Confined in the Mound".

=== Predecessors ===
Swedish scholar Waldemar Liungman, in his study on the tale type, argued that the tale originated in Jutland as a local legend. On the other hand, German scholar Hans-Jörg Uther indicates that Mullenhoff's tale is the oldest attestation of the tale type.

=== Distribution ===
Stith Thompson claimed that the tale type is "essentially Scandinavian", since most of its variants are collected there. Further studies by Hans-Jörg Uther and Waldemar Liungman confirm Thompson's assessment, since the tale can be found in Norway (with the title Kongsdatteren i haugen, or "The King's Daughter in the Mound"), Iceland, Sweden and Finland, as well as in northwest Germany.

=== Motifs ===
Uther recognizes that the story contains old folktale motifs, such as the accused bride and the imprisonment in a tower. The motif of the tower imprisonment, as in Rapunzel, is here only as a prison, and while they work in a kitchen, as in Catskin or Katie Woodencloak, the contempt springs only from the false bride.

In other variations of type 870, the false heroine's motive to substitute the heroine for herself is not ugliness, but to conceal that she is pregnant, as in Little Annie the Goose-Girl or Gil Brenton. In either variant, the false bride is unusual in that she stands in no relationship to the real one. In many more fairy tales, the true bride's place is taken by her sister or stepsister - which is another tale type altogether.

In other Scandinavian variants, such as from Iceland, the false bride is a troll or an ogre.

== Cultural legacy ==
A retelling of this story is told by Shannon Hale in the 2007 young adult novel Book of a Thousand Days.

Another retelling is in the 1999-2007 manga Ludwig Revolution, and another in the Daughter of Arden series by Loren Warnemuende.

The 2015 television film Prinzessin Maleen is based on the fairy-tale.

The poet Anya Silver rewrites this story in her sonnet "Maid Maleen" published in 2015.

In Stephen King's 2022 novel Fairy Tale, an underground prison is called "the Deep Maleen".
