= Princess Academy =

2005 fantasy novel by Shannon Hale

- The original cover of Princess Academy
- Author: Shannon Hale
- Language: English
- Genre: Fantasy novel
- Publisher: Bloomsbury Press
- Publication date: June 16, 2005
- Publication place: United States
- Media type: Print (hardback and paperback)
- Pages: 314
- ISBN: 1-58234-993-2
- OCLC: 57366112
- LC Class: PZ7.H13824 Pr 2005
- Followed by: Princess Academy: Palace of Stone

Princess Academy is a fantasy novel exploring themes of families, relationships, and education by Shannon Hale published on June 16, 2005, by Bloomsbury. It tells the story of fourteen-year-old Miri who attends a princess academy that will determine who wins the hand of the prince. The book was named a 2006 Newbery Honor winner as well as a New York Times Bestseller. It is the first in the Princess Academy series, followed by Princess Academy: Palace of Stone and Princess Academy: The Forgotten Sisters.

== Development ==
Hale first came up with the idea for Princess Academy while writing her first novel, The Goose Girl; her husband, Dean Hale, was reading a fiction book about a tutor to a princess, which prompted Hale to develop the idea of a group of "princesses in training". Her first draft didn't include the concept of "quarry-speech" and was added in the second. Hale drew from the similar concepts of speaking through wind, fire, and water found in her Books of Bayern series to develop this idea of communicating through stone. She has said that the fictional nation of Danland is "in the same world as Bayern but on a different continent and in a different time". Writing the songs that appear at the beginning of each chapter took Hale about a year. She also drew upon her own experience growing up in Salt Lake City, Utah, when writing about Mount Eskel and used medieval Scandinavian names for many of the characters.

== Plot ==
Miri is the youngest child to a single father living in a village on Mount Eskel. The village's main export is stone, and every villager works in the quarry except for Miri, who is forbidden by her father. One day, a messenger from the king unexpectedly arrives in the village and announces that, despite the lack of education provided for the villagers and the prejudice that exists between the mountain villagers and the lowlanders, the crown prince's future bride will come from Mount Eskel. A "princess academy" is established nearby to train the potential princesses, with compulsory attendance for every girl age twelve to eighteen. At the end of the year, the prince will meet the girls and choose his princess from among them.

Miri and the other girls attend the academy, where they meet a strict teacher, Tutor Olana. They first learn how to read and write, then move on to subjects such as the history of Danland, poise, conversation, and commerce. All the girls are eager to please the prince and win a comfortable life for themselves and their families. Miri makes friends with some of the other girls, including Britta, a lowlander who had recently moved to Mount Eskel. Miri's new knowledge of commerce helps the village improve their situation in trading with the lowlanders. After they break Tutor Olana's rules and flee home to the village for spring holiday, the girls use what they learned of diplomacy to negotiate a more bearable living arrangement with their teacher, including weekly visits home. Miri also begins to explore the mechanics of quarry-speech, a form of unspoken communication used by natives to Mount Eskel. Miri discovers her ability to use it outside of the quarry—though this was previously thought impossible—and does so to assist the other girls in their final exam. As a result, they all pass and qualify to attend the ball and meet the prince. On their final visit home before the big event, Miri's sister Marda gets in an accident while working in the quarry and breaks her leg. Miri runs to help, but her father yells for her to leave the quarry. Upset, Miri runs into Peder's mother, Doter, who tells her the real reason Miri's father never lets her into the quarry: Miri's mother was involved in an accident very similar to Marda's shortly before she gave birth to Miri and died. This encounter helps Miri realize her father truly does love her. Once back at the academy, her conversation with the other girls reveals that they never judged her for not working in the quarry alongside them. Miri realizes her feelings of resentment have dissipated, and that she now has the potential, with her new education, to become whatever she wishes.

Miri's excellence in her studies and her willingness to help her peers despite bitter competition eventually earn her the title of academy princess and the privilege of having the first dance with the prince. At the academy ball, the prince dances with every girl except Britta, who is ill, and generally acts very distant. Later in the evening, he takes a walk with Miri and shows a more human side. However, he leaves without choosing a bride. Once the prince has left, promising to return in the spring to announce his choice, bandits attack the academy hoping to hold the princess-to-be hostage and demand a ransom. Miri uses her new knowledge of quarry-speech to call for help from the village. At first no one seems to hear her, but eventually she is able to contact Peder. The villagers come to the academy through the blizzard, and the girls escape from the bandits and spend the whole winter at home with their families. In the spring, the prince returns and chooses to marry Britta—whom he has known since childhood—and names Mount Eskel an official province. Britta promises Miri the opportunity to travel to the capitol and continue her studies. The book ends with Peder and Miri admitting their feelings toward each other, and Miri choosing to stay in Mount Eskel with her family for a while.

== Characters ==
Miri Larendaughter: a 14-year-old girl and a resident of Mount Eskel, where she lives with her father, Laren, and her older sister, Marda. As a child, her father forbade her from setting foot in the quarries where the villagers work daily. As a result, she feels unwanted and assumes her small stature prevents her from being useful to her community. When the chief delegate of Danland announces that Mount Eskel would be the home of the future princess, Miri is obliged, along with all other eligible girls, to attend the princess academy. At the academy, she discovers a passion for reading and manages to stand out among her peers due to her intelligence, critical thinking and leadership skills, and willingness to help her classmates despite bitter competition. Her exam scores eventually earn her the title of academy princess. In the end, she returns to her home with dreams of starting a village school. She is the main character.

Britta Paweldaughter: A lowlander by birth who's initially presented as an orphan who moved to Mount Eskel to live with her only remaining relatives. She has a difficult time fitting into the local culture, and her silence is often misinterpreted by her peers as typical lowlander arrogance. At the princess academy, she befriends Miri and several other girls, although she never manages to hear the unique "quarry-speech" that unites all residents of the mountain. Britta starts out as the only girl who could read, although she tries to hide the fact in the hopes of blending in. It is later revealed that Prince Steffan had been Britta's childhood playmate and later love interest. Her father is a nobleman and has deliberately sent her to Mount Eskel under a false pretense so that she could wed the prince. In the end, Britta is selected by Steffan as his chosen princess and leaves to prepare for a future with the man of her dreams.

Katar Jinsdaughter: A brusque older girl at the Princess Academy who becomes Miri's rival as the top student and is determined to be chosen as the future princess. Deliberately setting herself apart from other girls, Katar comes across as snobbish and does not hesitate to demonstrate the extent of her learning as much as possible to the academy tutor, Olana Mansdaughter. However, she reluctantly joins the other girls when they oppose Olana's unfair treatment, though she points out how they have broken the rules of the academy and the resulting consequences. It is eventually revealed that Katar had lost her mother shortly after she was born, but unlike Miri, she felt unloved by her father. As a result, she wishes to leave Mount Eskel no matter what, even if it means marrying the prince despite her lack of interest in him. When Miri turns down Britta's offer to become the delegate for the newly designated province of Mount Eskel, Miri suggests Katar instead, believing her qualifications as the highest scoring graduate of the Princess Academy and her wish to leave Mount Eskel make her the most suitable candidate for the position.

Peder Doterson: is a 15-year-old boy and a resident of Mount Eskel who works in the quarry with the rest of the village. He and Miri were childhood friends, and once they grew older, their affection for each other blossomed into romantic love, a fact that they both feared to reveal. Whereas Miri considers herself scrawny, useless, and undesirable compared to other village girls, Peder is discouraged by his belief that Miri desires to marry the prince. Throughout the novel, Peder seems to have a special connection to Miri, as he is able to hear her pleas for help (when bandits held the academy girls) when even her own father could not. In addition, Peder has considerable artistic talent and finds a passion in carving linder, a hobby that is discouraged due to the need for extra hands to help with mining. However, as conditions improve due to Miri's skills in commerce, Peder is able to spend time on his hobby and looks forward to the day when he can formally study from a skilled artisan.

== Companion Books ==
A sequel, Princess Academy: Palace of Stone, was published in August 2012. The story follows Miri and her princess academy friends going to Asland to help the future princess, Britta, prepare for her wedding. Miri is also allowed to attend school at the Queen's Castle and befriends a number of students, whose apparent sophistication and exciting lives fascinate her until she learns of their frightening plans to overthrow the monarchy. Torn between loyalty to the princess and her new friends' ideas, between an old love and a new crush, and between her small mountain home and the bustling city, Miri looks to find her own way in this new place.

Subsequently, a third book was published in February 2015, titled Princess Academy: The Forgotten Sisters. After spending a year in Asland, Miri is looking forward to returning to Mount Eskel and reuniting with her family, but is unexpectedly ordered by the king to become the tutor at a princess academy for three royal sisters: Astrid, Felissa, and Susanna. Miri reluctantly agrees to journey to Lesser Alva, a swampy and remote territory where the sisters are residing when she learns that her beloved Mount Eskel could be lost in an impending war against a neighboring nation of Stora and that the successful marriage of one of sisters to Stora's king may save Asland. Miri is forced to endure the challenge of educating the three independently minded girls against suspicious locals and the natural dangers of the swamp land, while discovering that there is a greater mystery regarding the true identities of the three girls and the war looming closer than she realizes.

== Adaptations ==
The novel was adapted into two theatrical productions. The first was a play by Lisa Hall Hagen which premiered May 29, 2015, at Brigham Young University's Pardoe Theatre. The play was nominated for an AML Award for drama. The Kensington Theatre Company in South Jordan, Utah, then adapted the novel into a musical, featuring Scandinavian folk music.

In 2026, Hale adapted her novel into a graphic novel with illustrations by Victoria Ying. Kirkus Reviews noted that the story "translates well to the graphic medium".

== Reception ==
Princess Academy appeared on The New York Times Best Seller list in February 2008 for children's best sellers. It also appeared on the Children's Fiction Bestsellers list in Publishers Weekly in August 2007. Anne O'Malley wrote in a Booklist review that "Hale nicely interweaves feminist sensibilities" into Princess Academy. A School Library Journal review described the book as "an intricate, multilayered story about families, relationships, education, and the place we call home". Kirkus Reviews wrote: "the climax ... is a bit forced, but everything else is unalloyed joy".

== Awards and nominations ==
- Newbery Honor Book
- The New York Times and Publishers Weekly Best Seller
- A Book Sense Pick
- An ALA Notable Children's Book (2006)
- 2007 Beehive Award (formerly Utah Children's Book Award)
- 2005 AML Award for Young Adult Literature
- A New York Public Library 100 Titles for Reading and Sharing
- A New England Booksellers Association Top 10 Titles for Fall
- A Book for the Teen Age by The New York Public Library
- Honorable Mention for "Favorite Novel of the Year," PW's 2005 Cuffie Awards
- A Bank Street College Best Children's Books of the Year, starred entry
- Nominated for the 2008 Arizona Grand Canyon Reader Award
- Nominated for the 2008 Colorado Children's Book Award
- Nominated for the 2008 South Carolina Young Adult Book Award
- Nominated for the 2008 Young Reader's Choice Award, sponsored by the Pacific Northwest Library Association
- Nominated for the Illinois 2008 Rebecca Caudill Young Reader's Book Award
- Nominated for the 2010 Maud Hart Lovelace award (Minnesota)
- A 2007 DCF Voting Top Ten (Vermont)
- A Salt Lake Tribune Best Book of 2005
- Recommended Reads for Kids 2005 (Dover Community News)
