= Prinzessin Maleen =

2015 German-Italian TV movie

- Based on: Maid Maleen
- Written by: Su Turhan
- Directed by: Matthias Steurer
- Starring: Cleo von Adelsheim; Götz Otto; Mariella Ahrens; Lucas Reiber
- Music by: Siggi Mueller; Jörg Magnus Pfeil
- Countries of origin: Germany, Austria, Italy
- Original language: German

Production
- Cinematography: Michael Boxrucker
- Editor: Thomas Knöpfel

Original release
- Release: 26 December 2015

Prinzessin Maleen is a German-language television movie based on the German fairy-tale Maid Maleen by the Brothers Grimm. The film aired in 2015 as part of the series Sechs auf einen Streich.

== Plot ==
Princess Maleen and her childhood friend, Landgrave Konrad, have fallen in love. They ask for her father, Prince Theodor's permission to marry. Her father refuses, and insists that she marry one of his sinister courtiers, Baron Raimund. Princess Maleen refuses and, as punishment, is locked up in a tower for seven years. She frees herself after seven years to find that her father has died and his principality is in ruin. She travels to the county ruled by Konrad. Konrad, who believed Princess Maleen had died, is betrothed to marry Walpurga of Schwarztal. Walpurga, who only wants to marry Konrad to ensure that her inheritance does not go to her brother, plans to poison Konrad after the wedding. Maleen, searching for a new life, unknowingly begins working as a maid in Konrad's household. Walpurga, captivated by her social grace and beauty, bribes her into standing in for her at the wedding, but wearing a veil so that Konrad does not know it is not Walpurga. The plot fails and Walpurga is sent away. Konrad and Maleen are reunited.

== Cast ==
- Cleo von Adelsheim as Princess Maleen
- Peter Foyse as Landgrave Konrad
- Günther Maria Halmer as Prince Theodor
- Götz Otto as Baron Raimund
- Mariella Ahrens as Walpurga von Schwarztal
- Thorsten Nindel as Lothar
- Lucas Reiber as Peter
- Paula Paul as Maid Uta
- Peter Mitterrutzner as the old monk

== Production ==
Princess Maleen was directed by Matthias Steurer and produced by Marcus Roth and Sven Burgemeister. The film was shot in South Tyrol at Schloss Lebenberg, Ansitz Moos-Schulthaus, Schloss Englar, and Castelfeder Hill. It aired on German television on 26 December 2015.
