= Forest Born =

2009 novel by Shannon Hale

- First edition
- Author: Shannon Hale
- Language: English
- Series: The Books of Bayern
- Genre: Fantasy novel
- Publisher: Bloomsbury Press
- Publication date: September 15, 2009
- Publication place: United States
- Media type: Print
- Pages: 317
- ISBN: 1-58234-889-8
- Preceded by: River Secrets

Forest Born is a fantasy novel by Shannon Hale. It is the fourth book in the Books of Bayern series.

== Plot summary ==
The book centres around Rinna (Rin), Razo's fifteen-year-old sister who still lives in the Forest with their large family (known as Agget-kin). At the beginning of the book, Rin feels wrong in herself; when she was younger she ordered her niece around and it made her feel good, big and powerful. However, when her ma returns and finds that Rin has upset the niece, she scolds Rin and turns away. Rin, upset and confused, runs into the deeper Forest and hugs a tree as she would have hugged her ma, begging for forgiveness. At this point she discovers that she can ‘open’ herself to the trees in a way and absorb their peace. She returns home but continues to be afraid that if she speaks to people as she did to her niece, she will lose Ma's love. To prevent this she begins to mirror her mother and her favourite brother Razo. She doesn’t demand things or speak much at all.

However, when she is fifteen, she breaks all her rules with a boy named Wilem, who calls her wild. After that day the wrongness begins to eat at her again, and she buries and distorts the memory of her time with Wilem. After this, she discovers that the trees don’t give her peace anymore. She thinks that they have rejected her for what happened with Wilem.

Soon after Wilem, Razo and his girl Dasha return from Bayern's capital to visit the homestead. When they leave Rin goes with them, hoping that going out into the world will change her as it changed Razo.

They arrive at the capital and Rin is given a place as a waiting woman to Queen Anidori. She proves to work well with the young prince, Tusken, and becomes his main care-giver. After a few weeks another waiting woman named Cilie returns and demands to spend time with Tusken. Rin, who has always been good at reading people's faces, feels that Cilie wishes the boy harm and tells the queen. She takes Rin's concerns seriously and tells her to call her Isi, her nickname that only her closest friends call her. Rin admires the queen and begins to mimic her and see her as an idol.

Isi's best friend, Enna, is planning her wedding to Finn when Bayern's Own, the king's personal hundred-band, is called out to one of the villages near the border of Kel, a neighbouring country. A few days after they leave a messenger returns and tells Isi that they were attacked by fire. Isi, Enna, Dasha, Rin, and another hundred-band leave to assist them. At the last minute they take Tusken with them, for Isi fears that in their absence Cilie will harm him.

They meet the king's party, along with Razo and Finn, on the road to the border town. The king was injured and one man was killed. Isi, Enna, and Dasha set out to discover who was behind it. Rin, feeling that she needs to stay with Isi, leaves Tusken in Razo's care and follows them.

On their journey Rin learns about fire-, wind-, water-, and people-speaking. People-speaking is called by Enna a ‘curse’, and is said to corrupt whoever has it. Rin nicknames the three girls the ‘fire sisters’, and Isi says she thinks Rin might have tree-speaking. After stopping at an inn for a night and being almost killed by fire-speakers, the four discover that the queen of Kel is trying to kill them. As far as they know, however, there is no queen of Kel.

They continue their journey to Kel. Rin discovers that no matter where they go, the trees still reject her. She comes to the conclusion that she is the problem, not them; she is wrong.

They reach a village in Kel that is inhabited by soldiers of the queen of Kel. While the fire sisters are distracted a soldier threatens to kill a young girl. Rin, desperate to save her, once again breaks her rules and uses powerful words to make him let go of the child. Afterwards, despite having saved the girls life, she feels disgusted and sick with herself.

They arrive at Castle Daire where the queen of Kel is living. After the girls see Razo and Tusken in a cage over a bonfire, the queen of Kel reveals herself. It is Selia, Isi's treacherous former lady-in-waiting, who is a people-speaker and who everyone thought was dead. She captures the fire sisters but Rin, using her tree-speaking, manages to escape and free Razo and Tusken from the cage. They spend the night hidden in a tree and Rin, desperate to escape, opens herself to the tree despite the wrongness. There she faces the true, full memory of what happened with Wilem and discovers that she is a people-speaker.

Razo, Rin, and Tusken spend several days in the wood, avoiding soldiers and making a plan. Razo says he will attempt to rescue the fire sisters, but Rin discovers that he is injured and insists that she goes instead. Razo argues, so she tells him that she has people-speaking and isn’t safe to be around. She wants to risk her own, seemingly less worthy, life instead of his. Razo agrees to let her go because he thinks it will help Rin prove herself to her own mind.

Rin uses her tree-speaking to help her sneak into the castle, but is caught once inside. Selia tells her that Tusken is caught and Razo was killed, then throws her in the dungeon with the fire sisters. The next day Selia takes Isi and tries to convince her to sign a document naming her the ruler of Bayern's eastern provinces. If Isi, Tusken, and the king (Geric) were to die, Selia would become queen. When Isi resists Selia gets angry and tells her fire-speakers to hurt her, but they go too far and accidentally kill her. When Isi's body is thrown back into the dungeon, Enna and Dasha send water, air, and heat back into her body and Rin uses her people-speaking to call Isi back.

The next day Isi provides a distraction and Rin escapes the cell. She searches the castle for Tusken but has no luck, and is re-captured when Isi and Selia enter the room she is in. While Isi tries to resist Selia's people-speaking, Rin tries to think of a way to escape. After a while Rin realises that Selia is lying; Tusken was never recaptured and Razo was not killed. She tells Isi, who uses wind and heat to fight off the guards and fire-speakers. Selia's voice still affects her though, and in an effort to stop her speaking Rin punches her in the nose. Rin then speaks truth to Isi, using her own people-speaking, and Isi is able to truly take control. Selia, frantic and crazed, throws herself out the window crying, “I will die a queen.”

Isi and Rin return to the wood to find Razo and Tusken. The four of them then return to Castle Daire where, in the next few days, King Geric and King Scandlan (king of Kel) are summoned and the place is put in order. When King Scandlan arrives he is still affected by Selia, so Rin speaks truths to him to help him heal.

The Bayern people return to the capital, where Enna and Finn are married. After the ceremony Rin opens herself to an old elm tree. She discovers that she needs balance, that tree-speaking centres her and makes her stable, while people-speaking branches her out towards light and people.

The next morning, after farewelling Razo, Rin leaves to return to the Forest. She feels better within herself, but she wants to learn about her skills and feel right at home. Her family welcomes her home with great joy.

== Characters ==
Rinna (Rin): main character of Forest Born. A people-speaker and tree-speaker.

Razo: Rin's favourite brother. Spy and slinger in Bayern's Own. In a relationship with Dasha.

Ma: Razo and Rin's ma. Runs the homestead and is known by all Agget-kin, including her grandchildren, as ‘Ma’.

Queen Anidori/Isi: queen of Bayern, princess of Kildenree. Wind-speaker and fire-speaker, mother of Tusken and wife of Geric. Enna's best friend.

Enna: forest girl, married to Finn by the end of the book. Fire-speaker and wind-speaker. Isi's best friend.

Dasha: Tiran ambassador, Razo's girl. Water-speaker and fire-speaker, friend of Enna, Isi, and Rin.

Finn: Enna's husband by the end of the book, swordsman in Bayern's Own.

Selia: Isi's treacherous former lady-in-waiting, a people-speaker. Temporary queen of Kel.

Tusken: prince heir of Bayern, son of Isi and Geric.

Geric: king of Bayern, husband of Isi, father of Tusken.

King Scandlan: king of Kel, temporary husband of Selia.

Cilie: Selia's lady-in-waiting, Isi's temporary lady-in-waiting while she tries to kidnap Tusken.

Brynn: soldier that helped Selia escape execution, killed by Selia's fire speakers to keep the secret

Nuala and the Fire-Speakers: Selia's fire-speakers and servants who she manipulated with her people-speaking. They commit suicide when they see their dead mistress.

== Reception ==
Kirkus Reviews wrote: "Rin’s inner demons—connected to powers she does not yet grasp—are fascinatingly explored... One doesn’t need to have read the earlier books to become enraptured by this one, but doing so adds to the richness of these very satisfying tales." In a School Library Journal review, Genevieve Gallagher called Forest Born "a strong stand-alone companion" to other books in the series, adding: "Fans of the earlier titles as well as admirers of the genre will find Rin's journey a compelling read."
