= Austenland (musical) =

American musical

Austenland is an American musical based on the 2007 novel of the same name, with book by Jodi Picoult and Timothy Allen McDonald and music and lyrics by Kate Anderson and Elyssa Samsel.

== Synopsis ==
Jane is 33, single and obsessed with Jane Austen and Austenland, an immersive experience with a taste of the Regency era. When her aunt leaves her her inheritance for a chance to experience Austenland, she decides to dive in for the full three weeks experience, where she meets Miss Charming and Heartwright, as well as Captain East and the mysterious Mr Nobley. Will Jane manage to live the fully immersive experience or will she find her Mr Darcy in the gorgeous gardener Martin?

== Musical numbers ==
- "Unmatched" - Jane and Company
- "Lost in Austenland" - Company
- "Fully Immersed" - Jane & Ensemble
- "Your Itinerary Includes..." - Wattlesbrook, Jane, Martin, Manly & Ensemble
- "This is Torture" - Jane, Nobley & Ensemble
- "Best Bosom Bunch" - Heartwright, Charming, Jane & Ensemble
- "Know What you Want" - Jane & Martin
- "I'm Your Captain" - Captain East, Jane & Company
- "You in the Dark" - Company
- "Mr. Darcy" - Jane & Ensemble
- "Gents" - Manly & Ensemble
- "Gents (Reprise) - Manly & Colonel Andrews
- "Flippin' the Script" - Heartwright, Jane & Charming
- "This is Torture (Reprise)" - Jane & Nobley
- "Herstory (Part 1)" - Company
- "The Opposite is True" - Jane & Nobley
- "Herstory (Part 2)" - Company
- "Fully Immersed (Reprise)" - Jane
- "Fools in Love/Lost in Austenland (Reprise)" - Company

== Cast and characters ==
Character	NYC reading	London concert
Character	2024	2025
Jane Hayes	Arielle Jacobs	Lucie Jones
Nobley		Oli Higginson
Captain East		Stephenson Ardern-Sodje
Miss Heartwright		Laura Baldwin
Colonel Andrews		George Ioannides
Aunt Carolyn & Wattlesbrook	Lesli Margherita	Cassidy Janson
Manly		Idriss Kargbo
Martin		Daniel Krikler
Elizabeth Charming		Alex Young

== Productions ==
A first reading of the show took place in New York at Open Jar Studios in January 2024, directed by Lotte Wakeham. The cast was led by Arielle Jacobs as Jane, with Chris Marsh Clark, Daniel Yearwood, Lesli Margherita, Madeleine Doherty, Jordan Litz, Katy Geraghty, Paul Adam Schaefer, Steve Rosen, Tyler Joseph Ellis, and Vicki Lewis.

In February 2025 it was announced that the show would premiere in London at the Savoy Theatre in March of the same year for two workshop concert performances. The show was directed by Jonathan O’Boyle, with choreography by Joanna Goodwin. The creative team included musical supervision, orchestration and arrangements by Matthew Malone, musical direction by Natalie Pound, design by Polly Sullivan, lighting by Jack Weir, and sound by Sound Quiet Time.

Picoult and McDonald said "the show is a playful take on Pride and Prejudice for a post-Bridgerton audience. Austenland is a delightful escape for anyone who’s ever pined over Mr. Darcy… or for anyone who’s never understood his appeal.”
