= Cleo von Adelsheim =

German actress and model

Cleopatra
- Princess of Oettingen-Oettingen and Oettingen-Spielberg
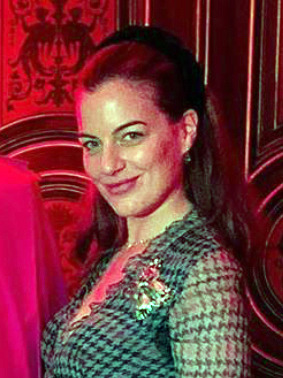
- Von Adelsheim in 2019
- Born: Cleopatra Freiin von Adelsheim von Ernest; 3 October 1987 (age 38); Bern, Switzerland
- Spouse: Franz Albrecht, 11th Prince of Oettingen-Oettingen and Oettingen-Spielberg (m. 2016)
- Issue: Princess Matilda Galilea; Louis-Albrecht, Hereditary Prince of Oettingen-Oettingen and Oettingen-Spielberg; Princess Milana Olympia
Names
- Cleopatra Olivia Elena Natasha Beatrice Friederike Louisa
- House: Oettingen-Spielberg (by marriage)
- Father: Baron Louis von Adelsheim von Ernest
- Mother: Lillian Elena Baettig Rodríguez
- Occupation: Actress, model

Cleopatra, Princess of Oettingen-Oettingen and Oettingen-Spielberg (Cleopatra Olivia Elena Natasha Beatrice Friederike Louisa; born Baroness Cleopatra von Adelsheim von Ernest, 3 October 1987) known professionally as Cleo von Adelsheim and Cleo zu Oettingen-Spielberg, is a Swiss-born German-Chilean actress, model and socialite. She is known for her title role in the 2015 German television film Prinzessin Maleen. In 2016 she married Franz Albrecht, 11th Prince of Oettingen-Oettingen and Oettingen-Spielberg, head of the German princely house of Oettingen-Spielberg.

== Early life and education ==
Baroness Cleopatra von Adelsheim von Ernest was born in 1987 in Bern, Switzerland. Her father is Baron Louis von Adelsheim von Ernest, a filmmaker and son of Baron Joachim Karl von Adelsheim von Ernest and Helga Annemarie Irmingard von Zitzewitz. Her mother is Lillian Elena Baettig Rodríguez, daughter of José Vicente Baettig Dättwyler and Teresa Elvira Rodríguez Nieto. Von Adelsheim's mother is Chilean, and the family relocated there from Switzerland when she was a child. She attended an English-language school in Santiago de Chile. She later attended Schule Schloss Salem, a boarding school in Germany, before transferring to Hurtwood House, a boarding school in England. She subsequently studied international communications and journalism at the American University of Paris. In 2013 she graduated from the Centro de Cinematografia de Catalunya in Barcelona, Spain.

== Career ==
Von Adelsheim began her acting career after graduating from the Centro de Cinematografia de Catalunya in Spain. She acted in short films, including Parker Ellermann's short film Seduction, before landing a role as the title character in the television movie Prinzessin Maleen, which aired on the German channel for Northern Italy. After the television film, she appeared in two television series, Cologne P.D. and Der Kriminalist.

Von Adelsheim is signed with Louisa Models, The People Agency, and V.Communication as a model, brand ambassador, and fashion influencer. She has posed for German fashion photographer Christian Schoppe. In August 2020 Von Adelsheim modelled in an advertisement campaign for the fashion line Fleur du Soleil, a collaboration between Sandra Mansour and H&M. In November 2020 she was featured in German Vogue.

As the Princess of Oettingen-Oettingen and Oettingen-Spielberg, Von Adelsheim works with the museum at Schloss Oettingen, one of the family residences. In June 2020 she presented awards to the winners of a photography competition at the castle. She is an active member of the Oettingen-Spielberg Family Foundation, which supports underprivileged people in Bavaria.

== Personal life ==
On 4 June 2016 von Adelsheim married Franz Albrecht, Hereditary Prince of Oettingen-Oettingen and Oettingen-Spielberg in a civil ceremony performed by Klaus Gramlich, the mayor of Adelsheim. On 9 July 2016 they were married in a religious ceremony at St. Jakob Church in Oettingen in Bayern. Princess Isabella Gaetani von Lobkowicz and Beatrice Borromeo served as maids of honour. The reception was held at Oettingen Castle. The wedding had eight hundred guests, including Prince Harry, Prince Max, Duke in Bavaria, and Pierre Casiraghi.

Her husband succeeded his father as the head of the House of Oettingen-Spielberg in 2025.

Her sister-in-law is Princess Nora zu Oettingen-Spielberg, wife of Lord Max Percy (a son of Ralph Percy, 12th Duke of Northumberland).

She and her husband live in Madrid, around the club Puerta de Hierro, where they are neighbours of Prince Christian of Hanover and his wife Alessandra de Osma. They also own a finca in Guadalajara. On 8 September 2017 the princess gave birth to a daughter, Princess Matilda Galilea. On 10 August 2019 she gave birth to a son, Hereditary Prince Louis-Albrecht. On 1 June 2023 she gave birth to a third child, Princess Milana Olympia.

== Filmography ==
- 2012: La Numero 4 (short film)
- 2012: Collage (short film)
- 2012: Entre Lineas (short film)
- 2012: Extraño Perfecto (short film)
- 2013: Seduction (short film)
- 2015: Prinzessin Maleen (TV movie)
- 2015: Cologne P.D. (Episode: Naked Facts)
- 2017: Der Kriminalist (episode: Shadow Girl)
