= Austenland (film) =

2013 romantic comedy film

- Theatrical release poster
- Directed by: Jerusha Hess
- Screenplay by: Jerusha Hess; Shannon Hale
- Based on: Austenland by Shannon Hale
- Produced by: Stephenie Meyer; Gina Mingacci
- Starring: Keri Russell; JJ Feild; Bret McKenzie; Jennifer Coolidge; James Callis; Jane Seymour
- Cinematography: Larry Smith
- Edited by: Nick Fenton
- Music by: Ilan Eshkeri
- Production companies: Fickle Fish Films; Moxie Pictures
- Distributed by: Sony Pictures Classics; Stage 6 Films
- Release dates: January 18, 2013 (Sundance); August 16, 2013 (US); September 27, 2013 (UK)
- Running time: 97 minutes
- Countries: United Kingdom; United States
- Language: English
- Budget: £4.9 million ($7.6 million)
- Box office: $2.1 million

Austenland is a 2013 romantic comedy film directed by Jerusha Hess, based on the novel by Shannon Hale. It stars Keri Russell as a single thirty-something obsessed with Jane Austen's 1813 novel Pride and Prejudice, who travels to a British resort called Austenland, in which the Austen era is recreated. JJ Feild, Jane Seymour, Bret McKenzie, and Jennifer Coolidge co-star.

== Plot ==
Jane Hayes, an American woman obsessed with Jane Austen—especially Colin Firth's portrayal of Mr. Darcy in the 1995 BBC adaptation of Pride and Prejudice—spends her entire savings on a trip to a Jane Austen-themed resort in England. At "Austenland", guests receive pseudonyms and period costumes, living as ladies of the Regency era. The highlight of the resort is guaranteed romance with the male actors, though no touching is allowed.

While Jane can only afford the cheapest "Copper" package, the other guests have purchased the most expensive "Platinum" option. Although she befriends fellow guest “Miss Elizabeth Charming”, Jane is treated with disdain by the manager, Mrs. Wattlesbrook, who prefers the wealthier guests. Jane, pseudonym "Miss Erstwhile", is provided a drab grey dress to wear.

Jane and Elizabeth meet "Lady Amelia Heartwright", another guest, and their actor-companions—the obsequious Colonel Andrews and the unenthusiastic Mr. Henry Nobley, who is Mrs. Wattlesbrook's nephew. Amelia and Elizabeth flirt with Nobley, who is reserved and Jane finds disagreeable (mirroring the meeting of Elizabeth Bennet and Mr. Darcy in Pride and Prejudice).

Martin, the resort's chauffeur/stablehand, flirts with Jane. Disappointed that the Copper package ostensibly has not provided a partner, Jane visits Martin at his quarters; after more flirting and witnessing the birth of a foal, they kiss and spend the afternoon together. When Jane is caught walking in the rain while Martin is delayed bringing her a horse, Nobley rescues her, lifting her onto his horse. Another actor, the muscular Captain George East, arrives and flirts with Jane; Martin rebuffs her for "parading around" with the actors. She asks if they are breaking up, and he replies that they were never "going steady".

Forced to play piano for the group, Jane performs the only song she knows, "Hot in Herre", shocking Mrs. Wattlesbrook. Stopping Jane on her way to find Martin, Nobley warns her against "cavorting with the servants". Returning to the house, Jane fights off a drunken Mr. Wattlesbrook.

Determined to find love by the end of her stay, Jane takes charge of her "story". Elizabeth steals several of Amelia's costumes for her, and Jane charms the group with new-found confidence. Mrs. Wattlesbrook discovers Jane's contraband cell phone and prepares to evict her, but Amelia—whose Platinum status circumvents the rules—lies to save her. In exchange, Amelia blackmails Jane into helping her win East.

The party rehearses a play (mirroring Mansfield Park), and Jane pairs herself with Nobley to allow Amelia to partner with East. Jane and Nobley bond, and Martin apologizes to her. After the play, Jane and Nobley kiss in her room, where he requests a dance during the final ball.

At the ball, Nobley confesses his love to Jane. Disillusioned watching the other actors fulfill their guests' fantasies with fake proclamations of love, she declares she prefers something real, leaving to spend the evening with Martin, whom she perceives as sincere.

Departing Austenland, Amelia reveals to Jane that Nobley asked Amelia to pretend Jane's phone was hers to prevent Jane's expulsion. Mrs. Wattlesbrook reveals that the actor assigned to Jane was not Nobley, but Martin, whose romance with Jane was fully scripted. Angry at being duped and certain she is not the only guest assaulted by Mr. Wattlesbrook, Jane threatens to sue Mrs. Wattlesbrook and shut down Austenland. Martin is sent to the airport to smooth things over with Jane, and Nobley appears, asserting that his own affections were genuine, but a skeptical Jane dismisses them both. When Nobley tries again to express his feelings, Jane thanks him for being "perfect" and leaves.

Back home, Jane clears out her Darcy collection. Nobley arrives, having traveled across the Atlantic to return her sketchpad. He explains that his name truly is Henry Nobley; he is a history professor who wanted to experience the Austen era; and he does love her. Jane finally believes him and they kiss.

A mid-credits scene reveals that Elizabeth has bought Austenland and turned it into a theme park, assisted by Colonel Andrews. Mr. Wattlesbrook now works as a garbage picker, Captain East does a strip show to Amelia's delight, Martin is snubbed by the guests, and Jane and Nobley are still very much in love.

== Cast ==
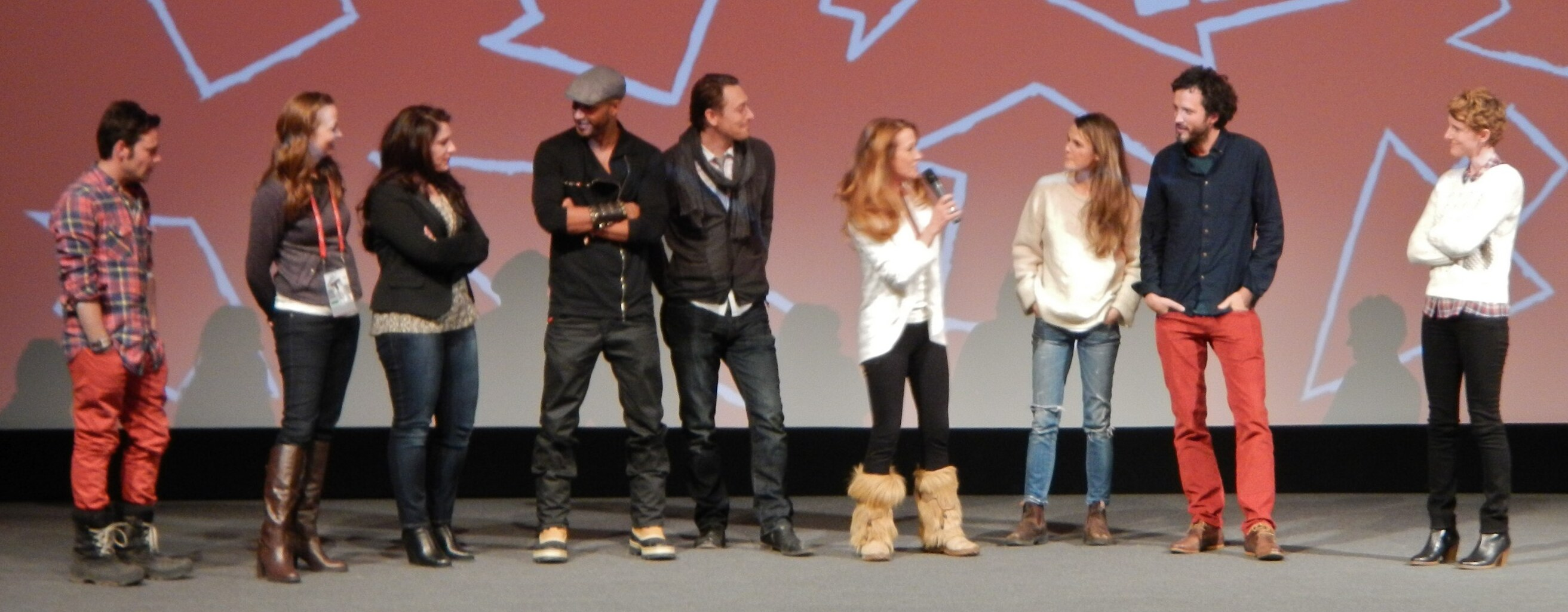
Makers of Austenland at the 2013 Sundance Film Festival (l to r): actor James Callis, book author and associate producer Shannon Hale, film scriptwriter Stephenie Meyer, actor Ricky Whittle, actor JJ Feild, actress Jane Seymour, actress Keri Russell, actor Bret McKenzie and director Jerusha Hess

- Keri Russell as Jane Hayes
- JJ Feild as Mr. Henry Nobley
- Bret McKenzie as Martin
- Jennifer Coolidge as Elizabeth Charming
- James Callis as Colonel Andrews
- Jane Seymour as Mrs. Wattlesbrook
- Georgia King as Lady Amelia Heartwright
- Ricky Whittle as Captain George East
- Rupert Vansittart as Mr. Wattlesbrook
- Richard Reid as Nigel

Rupert Vansittart played Mr. Hurst in the 1995 BBC mini-series Pride and Prejudice. JJ Feild played Henry Tilney in the 2007 television film adaptation of Northanger Abbey. James Callis starred in the 2001 film adaptation of Bridget Jones’ Diary, a book loosely based on Pride and Prejudice.

== Production ==
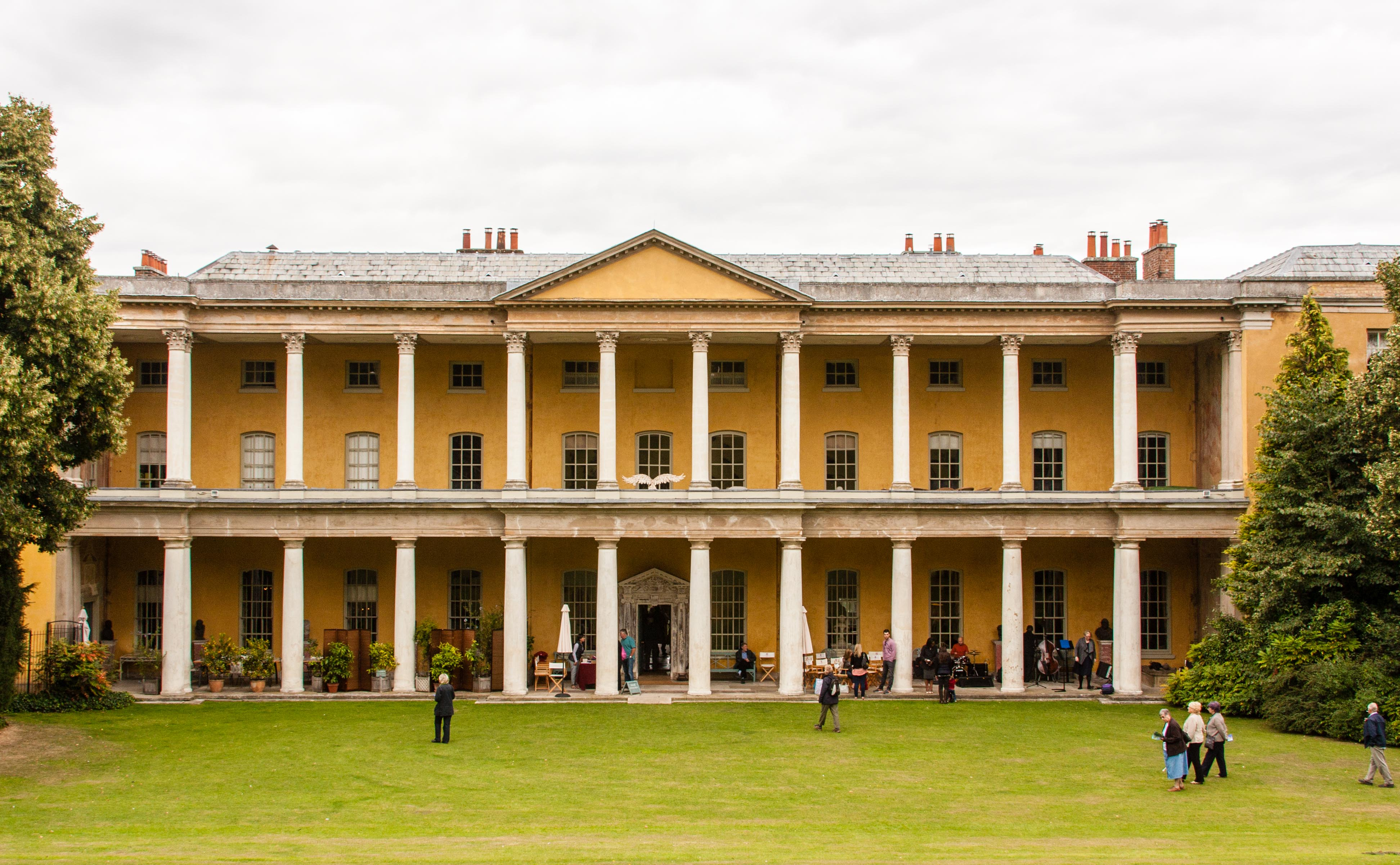
The south front of West Wycombe Park

Austenland was filmed in the summer of 2012 at West Wycombe Park in Buckinghamshire.

== Release ==
The film premiered at the 2013 Sundance Film Festival on January 18, 2013. A bidding war ensued shortly after which included Fox Searchlight and a joint bid from FilmDistrict and Exclusive Media. Ultimately, the film's worldwide distribution rights were bought by Sony Pictures Worldwide Acquisitions for $4–5 million.

It was theatrically released in four theaters in the United States on August 16, 2013. On the weekend of August 30, it went into wider release, showing in 52 theaters.

== Reception ==
The review aggregator Rotten Tomatoes reported that 32% of critics have given the film a positive review based on 114 reviews, with an average rating of 4.80/10. The site's critics consensus reads, "Despite an intriguing premise and fine performances from a talented cast, Austenland succumbs to outworn romcom cliches and slapstick gags." On Metacritic, the film has a weighted average score of 42 out of 100 based on 32 critics, indicating "mixed or average" reviews.
