= Itty-Bitty Kitty-Corn =

Children's book by Shannon Hale

Itty-Bitty Kitty-Corn is a 2021 children's picture book written by Shannon Hale and illustrated by LeUyen Pham. The book is a Cybils Award finalist, as well as a New York Times and 2021 IndieBound bestseller. The book was acquired by Abrams Books in a million-dollar deal after an auction with eight interested publishing houses. Subsequent books in the series include Pretty Perfect Kitty-Corn and Party Hearty Kitty-Corn.

== Plot ==
Kitty, a pink puffball kitten, is inspired by her unicorn poster to create a paper horn for herself. Feeling "unicorn-y," Kitty looks in a mirror and sees herself as a magnificent unicorn. Her friends Parakeet and Gecko, however, insist that Kitty cannot possibly be a unicorn. Kitty tries to address their concerns and act more like a unicorn, but they continue to insist that she will never be a unicorn.

When a real unicorn visits, Kitty finally sees how different she is in comparison. Her sad feelings do not last long though, as it is revealed that Kitty's admiration goes both ways because the unicorn has a headband with fluffy pink kitty ears. They are both kitty-corns! "I knew that another kitty-corn like you would see," says the unicorn; "Yes," says Kitty, "I see you."

== Controversy ==
Itty-Bitty Kitty-Corn has been criticized by some due to perceived LGBTQ+ themes in the book. After the publication of Itty-Bitty Kitty-Corn, Hale was accused of being a LGBTQ groomer for writing the book; Hale's response was that "a message in children’s books to be who you are is a very old concept. I’m not doing anything new here."

Ahead of the 2023–2024 school year, the Katy Independent School District in Texas removed new books from their library and put them into storage, including Itty-Bitty Kitty-Corn. The removal was part of a move to comply with the newly passed Texas House Bill 900, which bans "sexually explicit materials" from school libraries, although there is no sexually-explicit material in the book.
