= Princess Academy: Palace of Stone =

2012 fantasy novel by Shannon Hale

- First edition
- Author: Shannon Hale
- Cover artist: Michael Frost
- Language: English
- Series: Princess Academy
- Genre: Fantasy
- Published: Bloomsbury USA, 2012
- Publication place: United States
- Pages: 336
- ISBN: 9781619632578
- Preceded by: Princess Academy
- Followed by: Princess Academy: The Forgotten Sisters
- Website: Princess Academy: Palace of Stone, Bloomsbury

Princess Academy: Palace of Stone is a fantasy novel by Shannon Hale published in 2012 by Bloomsbury USA. It is the sequel to Princess Academy, the first book in the series, and is followed by Princess Academy: The Forgotten Sisters. It continues the story of Miri Larendaughter as she visits the capital city of Asland to attend the Queen's Castle academy and the royal wedding. It is a New York Times best seller. It has been published in English, German, Russian, and Chinese.

== Plot ==
Miri once again leaves Mount Eskel, this time traveling to Asland, the capital city of Danland. There, she is reunited with her best friend Britta, the princess-to-be. Peder also comes along, as he has been offered an apprenticeship with a stone carver in Asland. Upon arrival, they witness an attempt on the king's life by a man representing "the shoeless." Katar, now Mount Eskel's delegate, asks Miri to investigate into this revolution that the shoeless have begun because of their hunger and the king's greed. Meanwhile, Miri begins school at the Queen's Castle, where she meets a boy named Timon. Miri simultaneously begins to feel distanced from Peder as he devotes himself to his apprenticeship and she to her studies. Timon introduces Miri to his group of friends who support the revolution. Timon and Miri spend more time together and become more involved in the revolution. When Timon expresses his feelings for her, Miri begins to doubt the future with Peder she thought she'd have. She also feels conflicted between her sympathy for the shoeless and her friendship with Britta, who becomes the rebels' target as the revolution grows and more protests occur.

All at once, Miri learns that the king is going to demand a tribute from Mount Eskel that her people can't pay, and that Timon has betrayed her trust by publishing an essay she wrote about Britta's origins. More than ever, Miri feels torn between supporting political reform and her desire for Britta's happiness as princess of Danland. Britta's wedding begins, and Miri dances with both Timon and Peder at the bridal ball. Protesters block their way to the chapel the next morning, and muskets are fired. Miri finds Timon and his friends, but discovers that they have hired an assassin to kill Britta. Miri and Peder return to the palace and alert Britta, but a mob at the palace gates prevents the royal family's escape to safety. Though her life hangs in the balance, Britta saves a little boy from spooked horses, which changes the protesters' minds about her.

The royals then hide in a room in the palace, but hidden shoeless bandits seize Britta. Miri and the other Eskelites use quarry-speech, a telepathic ability connected to linder, to crack the linder stone under the bandit and save their friend. Next, the assassin finds them, and Peder is shot while protecting Miri and Britta. Miri quarry-speaks in a new, powerful way, causing the ceiling to crush the assassin. She then goes to Peder's side, telling him she loves him and quarry-speaking their shared memories. He survives, and Britta and Prince Steffan marry. Miri and the Eskelite girls enlist the help of Queen Sabet and propose a charter that would give rights to the shoeless to the delegates of Danland, who unanimously approve. With that, the revolution ends. Miri and Peder decide to become engaged once they arrive home in the fall. Miri decides to return home to Mount Eskel, but to come back to Asland in the future as well.

== Development ==
Hale originally intended for Princess Academy to be a stand-alone novel, but after it won a Newbery Honor in 2005, she began receiving letters from readers encouraging her to write a sequel. She wrote Palace of Stone without her publisher knowing; only her husband knew about the project. She was supposed to turn in a sci-fi novel to her publisher, but instead presented this follow-up to Princess Academy. Hale was hesitant to continue the story and interfere with what the readers themselves imagined happened afterwards, but became convinced she had to write the story after she developed the idea of a revolution. Palace of Stone took her seven years to complete.

== Reception ==
In September 2012, Palace of Stone appeared on The New York Times Best Seller list for children's chapter books. According to Bloomsbury's website, it became a New York Times best seller in its week of release. Publishers Weekly called it "a fine follow-up to a novel that already felt complete." In Voice of Youth Advocates, the novel was dubbed "a worthy and complex continuation of Miri's story," and was named one of VOYA's Perfect Tens of 2012. Anne O'Malley, in a Booklist review, stated: "this lively, provocative tale about political change and justice works better as a sequel than a stand-alone." Of Palace of Stone, Kirkus Reviews said: "The first half of the tale is a little slow and full of set-up, but the second half ... is powerful and deeply engaging."

== Awards and nominations ==
- 2012 – The New York Times Best Seller list
- A VOYA Perfect Ten
- A Publishers Weekly Top 25 Children's Frontlist Fiction
- A Publishers Weekly "Children's galleys to grab"
- A 2012 Whitney Award for middle grade finalist
