= Bear Came Along =

2019 picture book

- Author: Richard T. Morris
- Illustrator: LeUyen Pham
- Publisher: Little, Brown, and Company
- Publication date: June 1, 2019
- Pages: unpaged
- Awards: Caldecott Honor
- ISBN: 9780316464451

Bear Came Along is a 2019 picture book by Richard T. Morris and illustrated by LeUyen Pham. It tells the story of a group of animals on a river adventure. Published on June 1, 2019, Bear Came Along was based on memories Morris had of going to overnight camp for the first time. The watercolors, ink, and gouache illustrations Pham created were special for her. Critics wrote about her ability to juggle several different tones through the pictures. These illustrations were also generally seen as complementing the book's theme of being connected to others. The book was generally well reviewed and received a 2020 Caldecott Honor.

== Background and publication ==
The book's author, Richard T. Morris, said he based the bear character on his first time camping overnight. In an interview, illustrator LeUyen Pham said that she knew what the finished book would look like immediately after reading the manuscript and she eagerly accepted the commission. She created the end pages first, with the ones at the start in black and white and with the ones at the end in color, which helped her to understand the universe of the book. Pham felt that the book came at a time that the United States was divided and gave her a chance to tell a story of unity.

The book was published on June 1, 2019. There was also an audio book, narrated by Joshua Manning, which used sound effects and a soundtrack to convey the journey.

== Plot ==
A river lacks identity until a bear came along and fell into the river and is carried along on a log. This begins an adventure where the bear is joined going downstream by a frog, turtles, a beaver, raccoons, and a duck. Each has a trait or knowledge and also lacks knowledge of something. For instance, the beaver knows how to navigate but doesn't know about detours. After the duck joins, the group encounters a waterfall. The animals land safely and realize they "were in it together".

== Writing and illustrations ==
Pham loved the limited text and felt that the story was "so unexpected from [Morris]". The book has watercolors, ink, and gouache illustrations, which Julie Danielson, writing for Horn Book, compared to 1980's cartoons. Pham's goal was to draw the reader in through a contrast of the black and white and color illustrations. In an interview with her publisher, she described the book as special in her 20-year career: "It’s almost as if [Morris] grew a tree in a garden and didn’t allow any of the leaves to grow on it at all, it’s just the bare bones of a tree, and asked me to come in and decorate the tree. But without that strength of that tree, nothing would hold up on it." Librarian Brian Wilson, writing for Horn Book, describing the text as "action-packed yet reflective" and noted the way Morris' repeated use of 'until' propels the plot and creates structure for the illustrations.

The illustration's perspectives enhances both the dramatic and humorous elements of the adventure. Several critics wrote specifically about the book's climatic waterfall sequence, viewed in the animal's first person perspective. which Wilson called "one of 2019's great showstopping picture-book moments." Critics noted Pham's use of colors from dull grays to vibrant hues as complementary to the book's themes of friendship and the importance of connections and relationships with others. A critic for Kirkus Reviews wrote that there is a "depth of the message that comes through for even the youngest of readers: We are all in this together, and our differences strengthen our unity." Several critics also praised Pham's use of character expression with Wilson noting that she "excels at body language and facial expressions".

Several design elements also contribute to the book. The cover illustration, which omit the author's and illustrator's names, setup the adventure that follows. The forest depicted on the end pages was drawn to resemble a map of the United States. The front end pages show the animals living their separate lives, while the back of the book functions as an epilogue. Critics also praised the way the illustrations were laid out, including Pham's effective use of double page spreads and panels.

== Awards and reception ==
The book was generally well reviewed. Common Sense Media gave the book four stars out of five and noted its humor. In a positive review, Lucinda Snyder Whitehurst, writing in School Library Journal, noted that "its large-scale, immersive pictures expansively invite readers to come along." Publishers Weekly also called the illustrations the strength of the book, "cleverly designed illustrations... make this offering a standout choice for reading aloud." Danielson in her review for The Horn Book Magazine praised the character's journey; Kirkus Reviews also did in its starred review. The book also received a starred review from Ilene Cooper of Booklist who praised Pham's illustrations as "sensational and silly. Her vivid colorings and imaginative design command attention."

The book received a 2020 Caldecott Honor with a citation that noted how "the river comes to life with Pham’s energetic lines, gradual increase of vivid color, and surprising page turns to form a rollicking adventure and bonding connections." Pham said she was "validated" by winning the Honor, which was an unexpected feeling for her.
