= Austenland =

2007 novel by Shannon Hale

- The cover art for Austenland
- Author: Shannon Hale
- Language: English
- Series: Austenland
- Genre: Fiction
- Published: Bloomsbury USA, 2007
- Publication place: United States
- Media type: Hardback
- Pages: 194
- ISBN: 1-59691-285-5
- OCLC: 73502669
- Dewey Decimal: 813/.6 22
- LC Class: PS3608.A54584 A95 2007
- Followed by: Midnight in Austenland
- Website: Austenland, Bloomsbury

Austenland is a 2007 novel by Shannon Hale, published by Bloomsbury. It follows protagonist Jane Hayes, a graphic designer living in New York City who is secretly obsessed with Jane Austen's 1813 novel Pride and Prejudice, specifically Colin Firth's portrayal of Mr. Darcy in the 1995 BBC adaptation. Her aunt dies and, in her will, leaves Jane a trip to an Austen theme park in the English countryside, where customers and actors role-play as characters in the Regency era. The novel is the first in Hale's Austenland series, followed by Midnight in Austenland. A film based on the first novel was released in 2013, starring Keri Russell and directed by Jerusha Hess.

== Development ==
Hale's favorite author as a teenager was Jane Austen. Once she came up with the idea of a modern-day immersion program into the Regency era, it became "a story [she] wanted to tell" and one that took her seven years to write. She drew upon her experience visiting the United Kingdom during college and trips touring Regency sites while writing Austenland. Protagonist Jane Hayes was inspired by a friend of the author's, as well as Hale herself. She has also cited the 1995 Pride and Prejudice mini-series as inspiration for Austenland. Hale even dedicated the novel to the series' leading man, Colin Firth.

== Plot summary ==
Austenland tells the story of 32-year-old Jane Hayes, an average New York woman who secretly has an unhealthy obsession with Mr. Darcy from the BBC adaptation of Pride and Prejudice. Jane accidentally reveals her secret to her great-aunt Carolyn, who dies shortly after their conversation. In her will, Carolyn leaves Jane a trip to a Jane Austen–themed getaway destination. She decides to go, planning to give up dating for good afterwards. Once Jane arrives at Pembrook Park in the English countryside, she is bombarded with the complex rules of Regency era society. The proprietress, Mrs. Wattlesbrook, is eager to preserve these rules at Pembrook Park and makes it clear that Jane–who didn't pay for the trip herself–is not their usual type of customer. She becomes "Miss Jane Erstwhile" and meets Aunt Saffronia and Lord Templeton, her pretend aunt and uncle, respectively. "Miss Charming" and two gentlemen actors, Colonel Andrews and Mr. Nobley, are the other guests in the house. Andrews is jolly and flirtatious, while Nobley is brooding and arrogant. Jane also meets Theodore, the gardener, whose real name is Martin Jasper. He breaks Mrs. Wattlesbrook's rules to speak to her. As the days go by, Jane doubts her ability to keep up the act and begins to feel like an outsider. She finds Martin in the servant's quarters and they begin a new romance, but he cuts her off after worrying his involvement with her will cost him his job.

Another guest arrives, "Miss Amelia Heartwright", who has met Mr. Nobley before. A new actor, Captain George East, arrives, and it is clear to Jane that he and Miss Heartwright have some sort of past together. Jane grows bored and resorts to using her contraband cell phone, asking her friend for information on Martin Jasper and Henry Jenkins (Mr. Nobley). There is nothing about Martin, but her friend's e-mail tells her of how Henry forgave his ex-wife for many offenses before their divorce four years ago. When her cell phone is discovered by Mrs. Wattlesbrook, Miss Heartwright saves Jane from being sent away, claiming it was hers. Mr. Nobley tells Jane that Miss Heartwright and Captain East had previously been engaged, but her family disapproved and they were forced apart, though she still loves him. Mr. Nobley and Jane begin to spend more time together. The company puts on a play, and the two are cast as a couple. The night of the ball arrives, and Jane finds herself torn between the comforting reality of Martin and the uncertain fantasy of Nobley. Nobley confesses his love to her and proposes, but she refuses, unable to separate his acting from his true feelings. She finds Martin and plans to leave Austenland with him. In the departing carriage ride the next morning, Miss Heartwright explains that Mr. Nobley was behind saving Jane after her cell phone was discovered. She also learns from Mrs. Wattlesbrook herself that Martin was also an actor, and reported back to her about Jane's relationship with him. He finds her at the airport, but so does Mr. Nobley. They fight over her, and Jane walks away from both of them. After she sits down on her plane, Mr. Nobley sits down beside her, introducing himself as Henry and confessing his love to her again, this time in his own words. He flies home with her to New York City, and Jane puts her Pride and Prejudice DVDs out for all to see.

== Reception ==
Ella Taylor of the Los Angeles Times described the novel as "some lit lite to see you through a day at the beach". Stephenie Meyer, the author of the Twilight series, declared that the novel was "Adorable! The best tribute to obsessed Austen freaks (like me) that I've ever read." Kirkus Reviews called Austenland "mindless froth that Austen addicts will love." Ruth Myles of the Edmonton Journal wrote that Hale "creates a charming world that provides an entertaining diversion from the hustle and bustle of modern life" in Austenland. A review in The Christian Science Monitor criticized the novel as Hale's attempt to write "an Austen story" without the "dialogue, careful prose, and wry wit" found in Austen's books. School Library Journal described Austenland as "well written, [and] quite readable", with characters who are "quirkily funny". A Publishers Weekly review stated: "Though the narrative is endlessly charming, Jane is convincing neither as a sarcastic single girl nor as a romantic idealist, and the supporting cast is underdeveloped."

== Awards and nominations ==
- Book Sense pick for June 2007
- Wall Street Journal "notable book" for summer 2007

== Film adaptation ==
After filmmaker Jerusha Hess read the novel, she decided to adapt it into a film. Hale and Hess co-wrote the screenplay. The cast includes Keri Russell as Jane Hayes, JJ Feild as Mr. Nobley, Jennifer Coolidge as Miss Charming, and Bret McKenzie as Martin. Twilight author Stephenie Meyer produced the film. It was featured at the Sundance Film Festival and grossed $2 million domestically. It was filmed at West Wycombe Park in Buckinghamshire, which was also a filming location for Downton Abbey. The Hollywood Reporter praised the film's balance between Coolidge's comedy and Russell's sincerity, and noted that the plot "fall[s] into a bona-fide Jane Austen mold." A few differences exist between the novel and the film; in the latter, Jane pays for the trip herself and can only afford the "copper" package, thus emphasizing the theme of social class frequently found in Austen's writing.

== Stage adaptation ==
In February 2025 it was announced that a new musical based on the book will premiere in London at the Savoy Theatre in March 2025, with two concert workshop performances.

== Publication history ==
- 2007, USA, Bloomsbury USA ISBN 1-59691-285-5, Pub date 29 May 2007, Hardback
- 2007, USA, Audio Renaissance ISBN 1-4272-0141-2, Pub date 29 May 2007, Audiobook

== See also ==
- List of literary adaptations of Pride and Prejudice
