= Enna Burning =

2004 fantasy novel by Shannon Hale

- First edition cover of Enna Burning
- Author: Shannon Hale
- Cover artist: Alison Jay (first edition), Juliana Kolesova (photograph cover)
- Language: English
- Series: The Books of Bayern
- Genre: Fantasy
- Publisher: Bloomsbury Press
- Publication date: August 26, 2004
- Publication place: United States
- Media type: Print (Paperback)
- Pages: 317
- ISBN: 1-58234-889-8
- OCLC: 54081653
- LC Class: PZ8.H134 En 2004
- Preceded by: The Goose Girl
- Followed by: River Secrets

Enna Burning is a fantasy novel by Shannon Hale, published in 2004 by Bloomsbury. It is the second book in Hale's Books of Bayern series, following The Goose Girl. The novel explores the story of Enna, who was first introduced as a secondary character in Goose Girl, as she learns the magical ability of manipulating the element of fire. Enna struggles to balance the fire's intense power over her with her desire to use her powers to save Bayern, her home country, from invasion. Its themes include friendship, deception, and love. Reviews of Enna Burning mostly complimented the book's prose and character development. It received the 2004 AML Award for Young Adult Literature and has been published in eight languages: English, Spanish, French, German, Italian, Russian, Korean, and Vietnamese.

== Development ==
The main character in Enna Burning was first developed by Hale in her debut novel, The Goose Girl. Hale sought to create a protagonist very different from that of Goose Girl, saying that Enna "had more spunk, boldness, made more mistakes, and the differences were fun for [her]" to write. She has also said that this dichotomy influenced the second novel's becoming much darker than the first. While writing, Hale chose to focus more on the development of a particular character rather than the elements of fantasy. Both Enna Burning and River Secrets stemmed from Hale's desire to further explore characters she'd previously created; she "wanted to hear their own stories."

== Plot summary ==
Enna has returned to the forest to live with her elder brother, Leifer. After finding a vellum scroll, Leifer learns the secret of 'fire-speaking', the ability to control the element of fire. However, he is unable to control the power when he is enraged, frightening Enna. When the neighboring country of Tira invades Bayern, and Enna and her friends - Razo, Finn, and Isi (Princess of Bayern) - travel to the battlefront, and Leifer joins them. In their first battle, he uses his power to set fire to enemy troops and becomes consumed by his power, incinerating himself from the inside. Enna finds Leifer's body black and charred, but the vellum untouched. She disregards warnings from Isi about the potential dangers of fire-speaking and learns it. Meanwhile, her friendship with Finn becomes strained by their potential romantic feelings for each other. Frustrated and confused, she rides away from camp one night and accidentally encounters Tiran soldiers. She lights a fire to escape.

Bayern decides to put on a mock battle between a Tiran prisoner and one of their own soldiers to predict the outcome of the war. Finn volunteers, but comes close to death during the fight until he is saved by Enna, who burns the hilt of the prisoner's sword. Because of her interference, Finn succeeds; and Enna takes this as a sign that Bayern will fall unless she uses her powers to end the war. She makes a series of rules for herself which she hopes will allow her to fight in the war without meeting the same fate as her brother. Next, she tells Razo and Finn about her power and asks them to accompany her on a series of raids and keep her in check. Enna quickly finds she is unable to control her use of fire; she even tries to burn Isi when confronted by her. Feeling the call of the fire, she runs away to an enemy village and is captured. There, Captain Sileph of Tira uses herbs to drug Enna so that she can't use her power of fire to escape. He tries to brainwash her into teaching him the secret of fire and burning for Tira. Razo and Finn try to rescue her, but are captured during their attempt. Enna gradually gives in to Sileph's persuasive speeches, eventually falling in love with him; but after overhearing him speak to another Tiran, Enna learns that Sileph has been manipulating her.

While Sileph is away at a battle, a disguised Isi visits the camp to comfort Enna, who is so grateful that their friendship is not lost that she burns the vellum. The drunk guards outside Enna's tent reveal that Tira is planning to march on Bayern's capital, so Enna fights her way out of the camp with Finn and Razo. At the battle, they guard her while she burns the enemy soldiers, and she grows so powerful that she starts to burn herself. Isi cools her off using her powers of wind-speaking, and Bayern wins the war. The two then undertake a journey to Yasid, the kingdom to the south, to find and consult the rumored fire-speakers that live there. Along the way, Enna has to face Sileph and his band of Tiran soldiers. His charisma has worn thin for her and his troops, and they fight, with Finn showing up to help and the Tiran soldiers betraying their captain. Finn, Enna, and Isi reach Yasid and find the fire-speakers, who reveal that they balance their gifts with water-speaking, a skill that unfortunately takes years to master. Instead, Enna and Isi teach each other their respective powers to reach balance within; the wind calms the fire, and the fire calms the wind. They start back home again, both finally at peace. During the journey, Isi gives birth to a son, Tusken; and Enna and Finn are happily in love.

== Awards and nominations ==
- New York Public Library Book for Teen Age readers
- Association of Booksellers for Children Best Book, Science Fiction and Fantasy category
- Amazon Editor's Pick for Best Middle Grade Book of the Year
- 2004 AML Award for Young Adult Literature
- Sonderbooks Stand-out 2004

== Reception ==
Critical reception of Enna Burning was largely positive, with reviewers highlighting Hale's storytelling abilities and development of the protagonist. Dennis Lythgoe of Deseret News wrote: "As she did so well in The Goose Girl, Hale has created natural, interesting dialogue that leads to keen understanding and culminates in a strong moral. With her first book, Hale proved she could re-mold and re-interpret a known fairy tale; in her second, she proves she can create the fairy tale itself, one that has enough interest to become, over time, a classic." Kirkus Reviews described the novel as "slightly overlong" but "powerful and romantic." Charles DeLint for Fantasy & Science Fiction praised Enna's characterization, stating: "A good author gives us secondary characters as fully rounded as the leads. When it's done right, we care about both, and it's easy to spin one of the secondary characters off into their own story, which is exactly what Hale has done." Jennifer Mattson at Booklist called Enna Burning "a meaty, sprawling companion" to The Goose Girl, and praised Hale's "rich writing and sharply drawn characters," though it warned readers that the violent book has a "leisurely" pace.

== Publication history ==
- 2004, USA, Bloomsbury USA Children's Books ISBN 1-58234-889-8, Pub date August 26, 2004, Hardback
- 2005, UK, Bloomsbury Publishing PLC ISBN 0-7475-7573-8, Pub date November 7, 2005, Hardback
