= Princess Academy: The Forgotten Sisters =

2015 fantasy novel by Shannon Hale

- The cover art for The Forgotten Sisters
- Author: Shannon Hale
- Cover artist: Jason Chan
- Language: English
- Series: Princess Academy
- Genre: Fantasy
- Published: Bloomsbury USA, 2015
- Publication place: United States
- Pages: 326
- Preceded by: Princess Academy: Palace of Stone
- Website: Princess Academy: The Forgotten Sisters, Bloomsbury

Princess Academy: The Forgotten Sisters is a fantasy novel written by Shannon Hale and published by Bloomsbury USA in 2015. It is the third and final installment of the Princess Academy series, preceded by Princess Academy: Palace of Stone. It follows the story of Miri Larendaughter, who becomes a tutor to three royal cousins in a new princess academy in the swampy land of Lesser Alva.

== Development ==
In an interview with Publishers Weekly, Hale commented that her idea for the plot of The Forgotten Sisters stemmed from a mention of a swamp region in the original Princess Academy novel. Hale wanted to explore that setting and the story of the three girls who are members of the royal family. Because Princess Academy won a Newbery Honor, Hale felt "fear and pressure" in writing a worthy sequel; however, after releasing Palace of Stone, she had "dealt with fear ... and could move forward with the storytelling" for Forgotten Sisters.

== Plot ==
Miri is about to leave Asland to return home to Mount Eskel when she is summoned by the king, who explains that the neighboring kingdom of Eris has been conquered by Stora. In order to secure a good relationship with Stora and avoid war, the king has decided to establish a princess academy and offer a bride to Stora's King Fader. He asks Miri to travel to Lesser Alva, where three of his cousins live, to be their tutor and prepare them to come to Asland and meet the king. Despite the king's threats, Miri bargains that she will accept on the condition that she and the other graduates of Mount Eskel's Princess Academy become the owners of the land in their province. The king agrees, and Miri travels to Lesser Alva, a swampy area of Danland.

Miri meets the three royal cousins - Astrid, Felissa, and Susanna, nicknamed "Sus." The girls hunt and fish to survive; their promised money from the king stopped coming when their mother died. Miri finally helps them banish the man who has been stealing their money. Now that they are able to buy food, they have time to learn how to read, and Miri establishes a princess academy in their small linder home in the swamp. The sisters become sad when they learn that one of them must marry a 72-year-old king. Meanwhile, Miri writes letters to Peder and to Marda, her sister, that are never received. Peder has left Mount Eskel to search for Miri and see if she is safe.

When Storan soldiers invade Lesser Alva, Miri, Astrid, Felissa, and Sus try to keep the sisters' royal identities a secret from the troops. When Miri tries to help a man the soldiers execute, they capture her, but she is rescued by a man named Dogface - one of the bandits that had held her hostage when she was at the princess academy on Mount Eskel. He tells her to figure out a way to free Lesser Alva, cuts her hair to change her appearance, and frees her. Later that night, Peder arrives and informs the girls that Stora has successfully invaded Asland. He helps them escape via a pirate ship. When they are intercepted by Storan sailors, Astrid pretends to be one of King Fader's daughters and successfully convinces the Storans.

When the ship arrives in Asland, the five of them jump overboard and retreat from the Storans. They break into the palace and find Queen Sabet, who immediately recognizes Astrid, Felissa, and Sus as the daughters she was forced to give away. Miri realizes that they are indeed princesses, with Astrid being Crown Prince Steffan's older twin sister, and is outraged that the sisters were taken from their family out of fear that they would overthrow their brother, as a previous succession war had occurred between a royal twin sister and brother in Danland.

To stop the Storan invasion, Miri and Britta, Steffan's wife, escort the sisters to meet King Fader, only to learn that he has died. They realize the Storans had invaded on the pretense that King Bjorn had deceived Stora with the promise of a princess for a bride when he supposedly had no daughters. The Storans plan a secret attack on the palace in order to kill King Bjorn, which Miri thwarts by warning Peder through quarry-speaking. Though their plan to kill King Bjorn has failed, the Storans decide to use the girls as bait to lure the king into a trap. Miri, Britta, Astrid, Felissa, and Sus are thrown into a cell and treated horribly by the Storans, but meet King Fader's son, Kaspar, who has become the next king of Stora. He and Sus are close in age, and Sus proposes that they become betrothed in order to stop the war. Kaspar accepts, and a peace treaty is signed. The girls reunite with the royals and Peder and return to the palace.

Queen Sabet dismisses the chief delegate who took her daughters away from her and Britta is appointed the new chief delegate. The princesses are welcomed into the palace, and Steffan steps down as crown prince in favour of Astrid, who is the first-born in the family. Miri and Peder return home to Mount Eskel. Miri is reunited with her Pa and Marda, and tells them that the king has given the graduates of the princess academy ownership of Mount Eskel. The village celebrates, and Miri and Peder become betrothed.

=== Quarry-speech ===
In the first Princess Academy novel, Miri learned how to communicate non-verbally using the linder stone cut from Mount Eskel. Quarry workers use this "quarry-speech" to warn each other of dangers amidst the noise of their chisels and mallets. Miri discovered that quarry-speech operates by bringing the participants' past memories to their attention in order to alert them to events of the present. Because she and the other Eskelites have linder in their bones - after breathing in its dust and drinking water containing it - they are able to quarry-speak whenever they come in contact with linder. The "lowlanders" - those not from Mount Eskel - are unable to detect the messages. However, in Palace of Stone, Miri learns that the royal family is capable of a different kind of quarry-speech called "linder-wisdom." After living for centuries in palaces made entirely out of linder, they learned how to use its magical properties to detect the feelings of others. In Forgotten Sisters, Miri notices that the sisters have this ability, and Astrid, Felissa, and Sus use it to their advantage.

== Reception ==
Kirkus Reviews praised Forgotten Sisters as "a laudable conclusion to a popular series," particularly for its themes of feminism, equality, family, and education. In The Bulletin of the Center for Children's Books, Kate Quealy-Gainer wrote: "Hale once again manages to create a cast of female characters diverse in their qualities and distinctly individual." A Booklist review also praised the novel, saying: "Action-packed and well paced, the story's depth incorporates artful negotiation, the importance of education, and citizens' equality and rights." Jonathan Hunt for The Horn Book Magazine commented that "the themes of feminism and equality that run throughout the trilogy blossom in the resolution of this concluding volume." School Library Journal called the ending "happily ever after, with a satisfying twist."

== Awards and nominations ==
- A Junior Library Guild selection
- An Association for Library Service to Children/ALA Notable Children's Book nominee
