= Adrienne Moore Bond =

American poet, writer, and educator

Adrienne Moore Bond (1933–1996) was an American poet, writer, and educator. Born in Georgia, she was an English professor at Mercer University and received a Georgia Governor's Award in the Humanities in 1996.

== Life and career ==
Adrienne Moore was born in Macon County, Georgia in 1933. Her mother was Violet Moore, a writer, and her father was Sidney L. Moore Sr., an attorney. She graduated with a Bachelor of Arts in French and English from Mercer University in 1954. In 1958, she was a faculty member at Thetford Academy. She later became a professor at Mercer University and married Alpha May Bond. In 1963, she and Alpha had a son.

Bond wrote the historical biography Eugene W. Stetson, which was published in 1983 by Mercer University Press as the first book in the Great Mercerian Series. In 1985, Bond founded the Georgia Poetry Circuit, a group of ten colleges that annually organize visiting poets to their members' campuses. She served as director of the Circuit until her death.

A collection of her poetry was published in the book Time Was, She Declares in 1996. In 1996, she received a Georgia Governor's Award in the Humanities; at the time, she was an associate professor in the English department at Mercer University.

Bond died in her home on April 23, 1996 at the age of 62. After her death, a book collection of children's stories written by Bond, titled Sugarcane House and Other Stories About Mr. Fat, was posthumously published in 1997, with illustrations by LeUyen Pham.
