= The Princess in Black =

2014 chapter book by Shannon Hale and Dean Hale

- Author: Shannon Hale and Dean Hale
- Illustrator: LeUyen Pham
- Language: English
- Series: The Princess in Black
- Genre: Action fiction
- Publisher: Candlewick
- Publication place: United States
- English publication date: October 14, 2014
- Media type: Print (hardback & paperback)
- Pages: 96p
- ISBN: 978-0-7636-6510-4
- Followed by: The Princess in Black and the Perfect Princess Party

The Princess in Black is a 2014 chapter book co-authored by Shannon Hale and Dean Hale, illustrated by LeUyen Pham. It is the first in The Princess in Black series.

== Development ==
Hale was inspired to create the Princess in Black after a conversation with her then four-year-old daughter, Magnolia. Magnolia had explained to her mom that pink, purple, and yellow were all "girl colors", whereas black was not. Hale tried to reason with her daughter that girls can also wear black and that Batgirl wears black, but Magnolia insisted that "princesses don't wear black."

Hale decided to write about a princess who does wear black. She took inspiration from The Scarlet Pimpernel, Zorro, Buffy the Vampire Slayer, and Superman. She pulled in her husband, Dean, to co-write the story and LeUyen Pham agreed to illustrate it.

== Plot summary ==
Princess Magnolia is the perfect princess: she wears frilly pink dresses, dons glass slippers on weekdays, and is even afraid of snails. However, when Duchess Wigtower stops by Princess Magnolia's castle for an unexpected visit, Princess Magnolia must be extra careful not to let appearances slip. Over scones and hot chocolate, the duchess confesses that her real reason for visiting is to uncover secrets. Because even though Princess Magnolia seems prim and perfect, Duchess Wigtower claims that "everyone has a secret."

Their conversation is interrupted by Princess Magnolia's glitter-stone ring ringing—her monster alarm. Princess Magnolia does in fact have a secret, a secret identity as the monster-battling Princess in Black. She lies to the duchess that the ringing was a sick bird and hurries off claiming she needs to check on it. Princess Magnolia runs to her broom closet where she stashes her frilly dress and changes into a black costume. Now the Princess in Black, she slides down a secret chute and high-jumps the castle wall, landing on the back of her faithful pony, Blacky. Blacky is also a secret identity, only his alter ego is Princess Magnolia's unicorn Frimplepants (despite not actually being a real unicorn).

Meanwhile, a big blue monster has wandered out of a hole in the ceiling of Monster Land in search of goats to eat. Duff the goat boy tries to defend his goats, but becomes frightened and cries for help. The Princess in Black appears and wages battle with the monster. After many special ninja-like moves, she eventually hogties it. Despite this victory, the monster is still too big and heavy for her to push back into the hole. After struggling, the Princess in Black sighs and says "please"; the monster sighs in response and rolls into the hole on its own. Duff cheers for the Princess in Black, and on his way home comes up with an idea to train and one day help her as the Goat Avenger.

Left unattended in the castle, Duchess Wigtower snoops around until she discovers black stockings in the broom closet. She thinks she has uncovered Princess Magnolia's secret. When Princess Magnolia returns, the duchess confronts her and reveals that she believes the stockings are merely filthy white stockings the princess should wash. The stockings actually being black is ridiculous because "everyone knows princesses don't wear black." Princess Magnolia is relieved to know her secret is safe and that at least one princess does wear black.

== Reception ==
The Princess in Black was a New York Times bestseller, and Kirkus Reviews named it one of the best books of 2014. The Kirkus review said, "The gently ironic text will amuse readers (including adults reading the book aloud). The large print and illustrations expand the book to a longish-yet-manageable length, giving newly independent readers a sense of accomplishment...Action, clever humor, delightful illustrations and expectation-defying secret identities—when does the next one come out?"

The book received Honorable Mention at the 2014 AML Awards. Its sequel, The Princess in Black and the Science Fair Scare, was shortlisted for the same award in 2018.

In 2018, the Princess in Black series made The New York Times Best Seller list for children's series.

== Books in the series ==
- The Princess in Black (2014), ISBN 978-0-7636-6510-4
- The Perfect Princess Party (2015), ISBN 978-0-7636-6511-1
- The Hungry Bunny Horde (2016), ISBN 978-0-7636-6513-5
- Takes a Vacation (2016), ISBN 978-0-7636-6512-8
- The Mysterious Playdate (2017), ISBN 978-0-7636-8826-4
- The Science Fair Scare (2018), ISBN 978-0-7636-8827-1
- The Bathtime Battle (2020), ISBN 978-1-5362-1575-5
- The Giant Problem (2020), ISBN 978-1-5362-0222-9
- The Case of the Coronavirus (2020), digital booklet
- The Mermaid Princess (2021), ISBN 978-1-5362-0977-8
- The Prince in Pink (2023), ISBN 978-1-5362-0978-5
- The Kitty Catastrophe (2024), ISBN 978-1-5362-3409-1
- The Trick-or-Treating Trouble (2026), ISBN 978-1-5362-3410-7
