= River Secrets =

2006 fantasy novel by Shannon Hale

- The first edition cover of River Secrets.
- Author: Shannon Hale
- Language: English
- Series: The Books of Bayern
- Genre: Fantasy novel
- Publisher: Bloomsbury Press
- Publication date: September 5, 2006
- Publication place: United States
- Media type: Print (Hardback)
- Pages: 290
- ISBN: 1-58234-901-0
- OCLC: 62804636
- LC Class: PZ8.H134 Riv 2006
- Preceded by: Enna Burning
- Followed by: Forest Born

River Secrets is a 2006 fantasy novel by Shannon Hale. It is the third book in the Books of Bayern series.

== Plot ==
The story begins as the main character, Razo, watches a meeting. The king and queen of Bayern speak with a Tiran ambassador and agree they should exchange ambassadors to promote peace between the two countries. After the reception, Razo is chosen among other soldiers from Bayern's Own to join the ambassador in Ingridan, the Capital of Tira. Razo experiences self-doubt and believes their captain only chose him because of his participation in the war against Tira.

In winter, the ambassador, Lady Megina, and twenty of Bayern's Own leave for Tira. On the way, Razo finds a burned body hidden in the trees near a river. After talking with Captain Talone, they guess Enna might be burning again—either that, or the burner might be from Tira, because the body was placed where it could be easily seen by the Tiran escort group led by Captain Ledel. When the party arrives at Ingridan, they are taken to Thousand Year's Palace, where they are introduced to Lord Belvan and Lady Dasha, their host and hostess.

Razo finds more burned bodies and still does not know who the burner is. After being beat up by one of Ledel's soldiers, Tumas, he goes to Talone requesting to be sent home. Talone rejects his plea, and asks him a series of questions. After Razo answers them all correctly, Talone tells Razo he has excellent observation skills, and gives him the job of spying to find the murderer. Razo proceeds to watch and spy on everyone. A week passes, and the Tiran party challenges Bayern's Own to a mock sword fight. Razo is humiliated with defeat, and the Tiran soldiers mock him. Then Finn speaks up and tells them to challenge Razo with a long-ranged weapon, his sling to their spears. Razo hits every target and discovers that he is the best sling Bayern had.

Summer approaches, and the Tiran soldiers and all the nobles leave for the coolness of the country. Razo goes out to buy shoes and meets the prince of Tira. The prince tells him that he has no true power, except the power of the people's opinion. Razo spends most of the summer with the prince. They dye their white Tiran robes rich and deep colors typical of Bayern fashion, which begins a cross-cultural trend in the city.

Soon after Ledel's cohort returns from their summer assignment outside the city, Razo discovers a map and overhears a discussion that leads him to believe Ledel was behind the burning. Razo and Dasha go to the burner's warehouse but are captured. They fight back and are nearly killed - although Razo kills Tumas with his sling - until Enna and Finn, tipped off by Conrad, arrive. Enna and Dasha, whom Razo discovered had the gift of water-speaking, fight the newly-taught Tiran burners while Finn and Ledel duel. The Bayern and Dasha win, and the whole story - of Ledel attempting to teach fire-speaking to soldiers in order to spark another war, only for each to die when the fire overwhelms them - comes out.

Soon before the Bayern cohort is due to return home, Geric and Isi, King and Queen of Bayern, come to see the vote for or against war. They arrive too late, but come just in time for the celebration, escorting Isi's sister Napralina. At the celebratory feast, Finn makes a fool of himself by playing the harp and singing a love song to Enna, and Enna finally accepts his proposal to marry him. After the dinner, Razo and Dasha confess romantic feelings for each other.

== Characters ==
Razo - A witty, clumsy, lovable, 17-year-old boy who helped protect Enna while she burned in the war. He believes that Captain Talone made a mistake in choosing him for Bayern's Own because he can't fight well. He struggles to prove his worth to his comrades by solving the case of the burner. His eye of observation is exceptional. Razo also falls in love with Lady Dasha.

Enna - A gifted fire-speaker who burned most of the Tiran army during the war. One of Razo's best friends, Enna has a sharp tongue and is very outgoing. She volunteers to go to Tira to prove she can be useful for something besides destroying. She is in love with Finn, whose marriage proposals she eventually accepts.

Finn - The best swordsman in Bayern's Own, and one of Razo's best friends. Finn is serious and wary, and is more emotionally mature and less carefree than Razo. He is in love with Enna and often sleeps beside her to keep her from having nightmares about the Tiran soldiers she burned - however, he refuses to make love to Enna until she marries him, a fact that Enna seems to resent and Razo finds amusing.

Captain Talone- The captain of Bayern's Own. Talone generally hides his emotions, but he is devoted to Isi and Geric. Talone assigns Razo a position as a spy in Tira.

Dasha - The daughter of the ambassador of Tira, she volunteers to be the liaison of the Thousand Year's Palace. She knows Enna is the secret fire-speaker of Bayern and wants to meet her to learn her art. She has "river fingers," meaning she can manipulate water. She fears the water will overcome her, a fate met by her grandfather. She falls in love with Razo, and they begin a relationship at the end of the book.

Isi - The Kildenrean queen of Bayern, mother of Tusken, wife of Geric, and friend to Razo, Enna, and Finn. Her full name is Anidori-Kiladra Talianna Isilee. She can control wind and fire.

Geric - Isi's husband and the compassionate king of Bayern.

Tusken - Isi and Geric's infant son, the heir to the Bayern throne.

His Radiance - The prince of Tira, who will not have an actual name until he marries. His Radiance is extremely childish and does not seem to realize the tension between Tira and Bayern. He is innocent and carefree and befriends Razo when they run into each other at a marketday. The people of Tira are very fond of their prince, but he has virtually no power in the nation. Neither Enna nor Finn particularly like His Radiance, but they protect him to keep the peace in Tira. At the end of the book, His Radiance meets Isi's sister Napralina-Victery, and it is implied they later marry.

Ledel - The Tiran captain. He attempts to teach his soldiers fire-speaking so they can burn Bayern as Bayern burned the Tiran army. However, he teaches fire-speaking improperly, so many of his men burn themselves from the inside out.

Megina - The ambassador of Bayern to Tira.

Napralina- Isi's younger sister. Princess of Kildenree. It is implied that Napralina will later marry His Radiance and become Queen/Princess Napralina-Victery of Tira. Napralina is a small character mentioned at the beginning of the Goose Girl and at the end of River Secrets.

== Awards and nominations ==
- Nominated for Yalsa's Teens' Top Ten
- Nominated for the ALA's Best Books for Young Adults
- A St. Louis Post Dispatch Best Book of 2006

== Publication history ==
- 2006, USA, Bloomsbury USA ISBN 1-58234-901-0, Pub date 5 September 2006, Hardback
