= Richard Thacker Morris =

American sociologist (1917–1981)

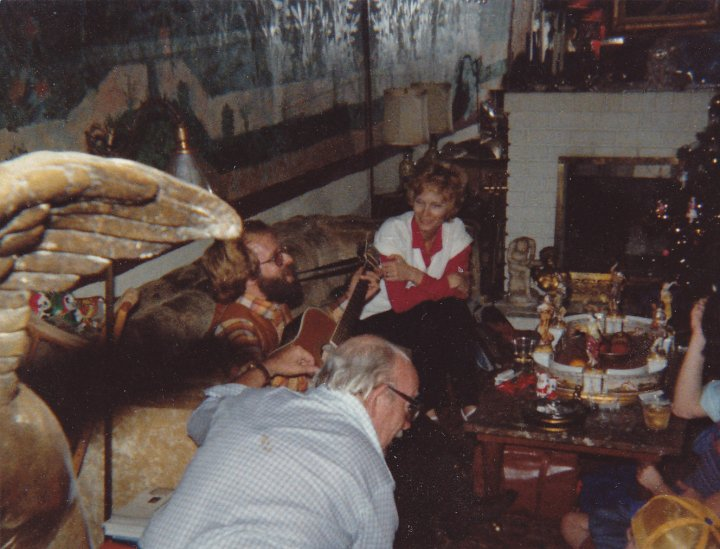
- Morris (foreground in white), at his Los Gatos home, during the late 1970s
- Born: April 28, 1917; Ohio, U.S.
- Died: March 17, 1981 (aged 63); Los Gatos, California
- Education: Ohio State University
- Occupations: Professor and author
- Spouse: Tanya
- Writing career
- Language: English
- Subject: Sociology
- Notable works: The Two-Way Mirror; The White Reaction Study

Richard Thacker Morris (April 28, 1917 – March 17, 1981) was a professor of Sociology at the University of California at Los Angeles. He was the author of The Two-Way Mirror: National Status in Foreign Students' Adjustment (1960), as well as The White Reaction Study (1967), an important work on urban race relations.

== Academic career ==
Morris earned his Ph.D. at Ohio State University in 1952, where his doctoral dissertation employed the paradigm method in order to develop a general model of social stratification. In addition to his dissertation and two published books, his work also included numerous articles which appeared in such peer-reviewed journals as the American Journal of Sociology, American Sociological Review, Sociological Inquiry, and Sociology and Social Research. He held a professorship at UCLA from 1953 to 1976, during which time he did research as a Fulbright scholar in the Netherlands (1963–64). During his tenure at UCLA, he also served as Acting Dean of the School of Social Welfare, and later as Chairman of the Department of Sociology. He was also an associate editor and book review editor of American Sociological Review.
