= Shannon Hale =

American author (born 1974)

- Hale in 2026
- Born: Shannon Bryner; January 26, 1974 (age 52); Salt Lake City, Utah, U.S.
- Education: University of Utah; University of Montana
- Occupation: Novelist
- Spouse: Dean Hale
- Children: 4
- Writing career
- Language: English
- Period: 2003–present
- Genres: Young adult, fantasy
- Notable works: The Goose Girl; Princess Academy; Book of a Thousand Days; Austenland
- Website: squeetus.com

Shannon Hale (née Bryner; born January 26, 1974) is an American author primarily of young adult fantasy, including the Newbery Honor book Princess Academy and The Goose Girl. Her first novel for adults, Austenland, was adapted into a film in 2013. She is a graduate of the University of Utah and the University of Montana. She has also co-written with her husband, Dean.

== Early life ==
Hale was born on January 26, 1974, in Salt Lake City to Wallace and Bonnie Bryner. She is the middle child of five children; she has two older sisters, one younger sister, and one younger brother. She enjoyed writing, reading, and acting as a young girl; she often created plays that she would act out with friends. She also began to write fantasy books at age 10, often featuring herself as the protagonist. Her elementary school teachers encouraged her creative endeavors, and, in the fourth grade, Hale announced that she wanted to be a writer as an adult. In junior high, she participated on the school literary magazine. She then attended West High School, where she cultivated passions for English and drama. She took a creative writing class and worked as an editor of fiction for her high school's literary magazine. She participated in both school and community theater productions, including The Secret Garden. Hale also took part in drama competitions and traveled throughout Utah and the U.S. with an improvisational theater group whose productions highlighted a range of teen issues. She met her spouse, Dean Hale, freshman year at West High School; he was also involved in theater. Hale has said that her theater experience has improved her writing skills, particularly in character creation and world building.

She attended the University of Utah, initially majoring in both English and Theater before deciding solely to pursue the former. She served as a missionary for the Church of Jesus Christ of Latter-day Saints in Paraguay for 18 months before graduating with a bachelor's degree in English from the University of Utah in 1998. She later earned a master's degree in Creative Writing from the University of Montana. While studying at the University of Montana, Hale wrote 100 short stories and submitted many for publication, but none were accepted.

== Writing ==
Hale began writing The Goose Girl while in her graduate writing program, and worked on her drafts of it during her lunch break while working at her instructional design job. She originally planned to work in literary fiction, publishing short stories and teaching English, before writing young adult and children's books. The Goose Girl became her first published novel after being met with nine rejections; Hale received an offer in 2003 from Bloomsbury Publishing. She based the book on her favorite fairy tale of the same name. It was named an ALA Teens' Top Ten and became the first of many novels in Hale's Books of Bayern series. The Goose Girl also won the 2004 Josette Frank Award for fiction and was reprinted by Bloomsbury in 2017. Hundreds of thousands of copies of the novel have been printed in a total of fifteen languages. The other Books of Bayern include Enna Burning, River Secrets, and Forest Born.

Her novel Princess Academy was featured on The New York Times Best Seller list, as well as that of Book Sense and Publishers Weekly. It also received a Newbery Honor. Hale said that receiving the award was an "unexpected gift" that has profoundly affected her career. After the positive response from readers and reviewers alike to Princess Academy, Hale wrote its sequel, Princess Academy: Palace of Stone. In 2015 she continued the story with a third installment, Princess Academy: The Forgotten Sisters. Hale has remarked that the series is "a love letter to education."

Her first adult novel, Austenland, was also featured by Book Sense. Hale and screenwriter Jerusha Hess then wrote the screenplay for a film adaptation of Austenland, released in 2013 at the Sundance Film Festival. It was then bought by Sony Pictures for $4 million. Twilight author Stephenie Meyer produced the film and Keri Russell starred as protagonist Jane Hayes. In 2012 Hale released a sequel novel, Midnight in Austenland. Another adult novel, The Actor and the Housewife, was published in 2009 and was named "the City Weekly readers' choice winner for best novel of the year." Hale has kept numerous rejection letters she has received from publishers, and has compiled them into one 60 foot long scroll.

In 2017, Hale released a graphic memoir titled Real Friends, chronicling her struggles in grade school. It was illustrated by LeUyen Pham. Its sequel, Best Friends, appeared on The New York Times Best Seller list for graphic books and manga in April 2020. In 2018, her Princess in Black series—which she wrote with her husband, Dean Hale—made The New York Times Best Seller list for children's series. The two also co-wrote the graphic novel Rapunzel's Revenge, as well as two young adult novels for the Marvel superheroes Squirrel Girl and Captain Marvel. Hale ventured further into science fiction with her own YA superhero novel, Dangerous, in 2014.

== Other work ==
Before becoming a full-time author, Hale participated in stage and improvisational comedy, studied in Mexico and the United Kingdom, and worked as an instructional designer.

She is an advocate for gender equality; she has noticed how her books are marketed only to girls, despite positive reception from both genders. She has written a few articles about this subject.

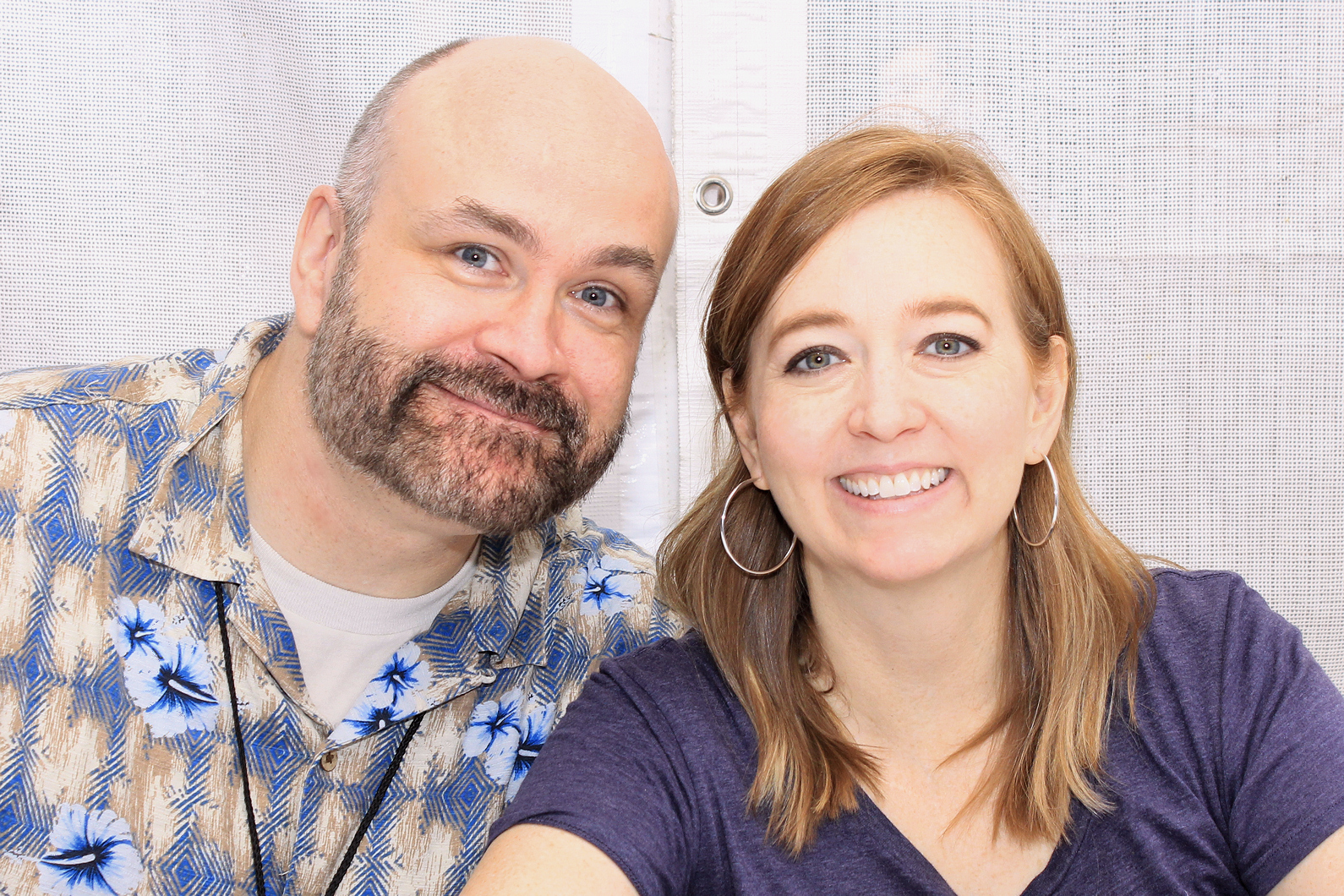
Hale with husband Dean at the 2016 Texas Book Festival

== Personal life ==
Hale is married to Dean C. Hale, with whom she has co-authored the Eisner-nominee graphic novels Rapunzel's Revenge and Calamity Jack, as well as The Princess in Black series and The Unbeatable Squirrel Girl series.

She is a member of the Church of Jesus Christ of Latter-day Saints (LDS Church). She stopped attending the LDS church in 2021, having disagreed with her community's apparent tolerance of misogyny and intolerance of LGBTQ people, but she still considers herself a Mormon. In a 2014 interview, Hale said that she doesn't "consciously make storytelling choices based on the [LDS] Church." In writing her graphic novel memoirs of her childhood, Hale decided to include visual references to her religious upbringing, like her family attending church. Despite being asked to remove the references (due to worries that it might affect sales), Hale decided to retain them, stating that "to erase [them] felt like a lie."

She is the mother of four children: Max, Magnolia, and twin girls Dinah and Wren. Hale has noted that her children give her new ideas for books "probably every day."

== Awards and honors ==
The Princess in Black was a New York Times bestseller, and Kirkus Reviews named it one of the best books of 2014.

In February 2016, Hale was a Literary Guest of Honor and Keynote Speaker at the 34th annual Life, the Universe, & Everything professional science fiction and fantasy arts symposium.

In 2017, Real Friends landed on Booklist's "Top 10 Graphic Novels for Youth" list.

Itty-Bitty Kitty-Corn was a New York Times and IndieBound bestseller.

Awards for Hale's writing
| Year | Title | Award | Result | Ref. |
|---|---|---|---|---|
| 2003 | The Goose Girl | AML Award in Young Adult Literature | Winner | |
| 2004 | The Goose Girl | Josette Frank Award | Winner | |
| 2004 | Enna Burning | AML Award in Young Adult Literature | Winner | |
| 2005 | Princess Academy | AML Award in Young Adult Literature | Winner | |
| 2006 | Princess Academy | Newbery Medal | Honor | |
| 2006 | River Secrets | AML Award in Young Adult Literature | Honor | |
| 2007 | Austenland | AML Award in Novel | Finalist | |
| 2007 | Book of a Thousand Days | AML Award in Young Adult Literature | Finalist | |
| 2007 | Book of a Thousand Days | Cybils Award for Young Adult Speculative Fiction | Winner | |
| 2007 | Book of a Thousand Days | Whitney Award for Best Speculative | Winner | |
| 2007 | River Secrets | Teens' Top Ten | Top 10 | |
| 2008 | Rapunzel's Revenge | Cybils Award for Elementary and Middle Grade Graphic Novel | Winner | |
| 2009 | Rapunzel's Revenge | Leah Adezio Award for Best Kid-Friendly Work | Winner | |
| 2012 | Palace of Stone | Whitney Award for Best Middle Grade | Finalist | |
| 2014 | Dangerous | Whitney Award for Best Young Adult – Speculative | Finalist | |
| 2014 | The Princess in Black | AML Award in Picture Book | Honorable | |
| 2015 | Princess Academy | AML Award in Drama | Finalist | |
| 2016 | The Princess in Black and the Hungry Bunny Horde | Cybils Award for Early Chapter Books | Finalist | |
| 2017 | The Princess in Black Takes a Vacation | Cybils Award for Early Chapter Books | Finalist | |
| 2017 | The Unbeatable Squirrel Girl | Whitney Award for Best Young Adult Speculative Fiction | Finalist | |
| 2017 | Friends Forever | Cybils Award for Elementary and Middle Grade Graphic Novel | Finalist | |
| 2017 | Real Friends | AML Award in Comics | Winner | |
| 2017 | Real Friends | Cybils Award for | Finalist | |
| 2018 | Real Friends | Booklist Editors' Choice: Books for Youth | Selection | |
| 2018 | Real Friends | Excellence in Graphic Literature Awards: Best in Children's Books | Winner | |
| 2018 | Real Friends | Great Graphic Novels for Teens | Selection | |
| 2018 | The Unbeatable Squirrel Girl | ALSC Notable Children's Recordings | Selection | |
| 2020 | Best Friends | Amelia Bloomer Book List | Selection | |
| 2020 | Best Friends | Great Graphic Novels for Teens | Selection | |
| 2021 | Friends Forever | AML Award in Comics | Winner | |
| 2021 | Itty-Bitty Kitty-Corn | Cybils Award for Fiction Picture book | Finalist | |
| 2022 | Friends Forever | Great Graphic Novels for Teens | Selection | |

== Publications ==
=== The Books of Bayern series ===
- The Goose Girl (2003), ISBN 1-58234-843-X
- Enna Burning (2004), ISBN 1-58234-889-8
- River Secrets (2006), ISBN 1-58234-901-0
- Forest Born (2009), ISBN 1-59990-167-6

=== Princess Academy series ===
- Princess Academy (2005), ISBN 1-58234-993-2
  - Adapted into Princess Academy: The Graphic Novel (2026), ISBN 978-1-5476-1204-8, illustrated by Victoria Ying
- Princess Academy: Palace of Stone (2012), ISBN 1-59990-873-5
- Princess Academy: The Forgotten Sisters (2015), ISBN 978-1-61963-485-5

=== Austenland series ===
- Austenland (2007), ISBN 1-59691-285-5 – premiered as a movie in January 2013
- Midnight in Austenland (2012), ISBN 1-60819-625-9
- Christmas in Austenland (2026), ISBN 1-63973-890-8

=== Rapunzel's Revenge series ===
The Rapunzel's Revenge series is co-authored with Dean Hale and illustrated by Nathan Hale (no relation).

- Rapunzel's Revenge (2008), ISBN 1-59990-288-5
- Calamity Jack (2010), ISBN 978-1-59990-076-6

=== Ever After High series ===
- Ever After High: The Storybook of Legends (2013), ISBN 0-31640-122-6
- Ever After High: The Unfairest of Them All (2014), ISBN 0-31628-201-4
- Ever After High: A Wonderlandiful World (2014), ISBN 0-31628-209-X
- Once Upon a Time: A Story Collection (2014), ISBN 0-31625-821-0
- Monster High/Ever After High: The Legend of Shadow High (2017), ISBN 0-31635-282-9

=== Princess in Black series ===
The Princess in Black series is co-authored with Dean Hale and illustrated by LeUyen Pham.

- The Princess in Black (2014), ISBN 978-0-7636-6510-4
- The Perfect Princess Party (2015), ISBN 978-0-7636-6511-1
- The Hungry Bunny Horde (2016), ISBN 978-0-7636-6513-5
- Takes a Vacation (2016), ISBN 978-0-7636-6512-8
- The Mysterious Playdate (2017), ISBN 978-0-7636-8826-4
- The Science Fair Scare (2018), ISBN 978-0-7636-8827-1
- The Bathtime Battle (2020), ISBN 978-1-5362-1575-5
- The Giant Problem (2020), ISBN 978-1-5362-0222-9
- The Case of the Coronavirus (2020), digital booklet
- The Mermaid Princess (2021), ISBN 978-1-5362-0977-8
- The Prince in Pink (2023), ISBN 978-1-5362-0978-5
- The Kitty Catastrophe (2024), ISBN 978-1-5362-3409-1
- The Trick-or-Treating Trouble (2026), ISBN 978-1-5362-3410-7

=== The Unbeatable Squirrel Girl series ===
The Unbeatable Squirrel Girl series is co-authored with Dean Hale.

- The Unbeatable Squirrel Girl: Squirrel Meets World (2017), ISBN 978-1484781548
- The Unbeatable Squirrel Girl: 2 Fuzzy, 2 Furious (2018), ISBN 978-1368011266

=== Real Friends series ===
The Real Friends series graphic memoirs are illustrated by LeUyen Pham.

- Real Friends (2017), ISBN 9781626724167
- Best Friends (2019), ISBN 9781250317452
- Friends Forever (2021), ISBN 9781250317568

=== Standalone novels ===
- Book of a Thousand Days (2007), ISBN 1-59990-051-3
- The Actor and the Housewife (2009), ISBN 1-59691-288-X
- Dangerous (2014), ISBN 1-59990-168-4
- Kind of a Big Deal (2020), ISBN 9781250206237
- Amethyst: Princess of Gemworld (2021) ISBN 9781779508645, co-authored with Dean Hale and illustrated by Asiah Fulmore
- This Book Is Not For You! (2022) ISBN 9781984816863, illustrated by Tracy Subisak

=== Short stories ===
- "Bouncing the Grinning Goat" from Guys Read: Other Worlds (2013)

=== Diana: Princess of the Amazons series ===
The Diana series is co-authored with Dean Hale and illustrated by Victoria Ying.

- Diana: Princess of the Amazons (2020) ISBN 9781401291112
- Diana and Nubia: Princesses of the Amazons (2022) ISBN 9781779507693

=== Itty-Bitty Kitty-Corn series ===
The Itty-Bitty Kitty-Corn picture books are illustrated by LeUyen Pham.

- Itty-Bitty Kitty-Corn (2021), ISBN 978-1-4197-5091-5
- Pretty Perfect Kitty-Corn (2022), ISBN 978-1-4197-5093-9
- Party Hearty Kitty-Corn (2023), ISBN 978-1-4197-5095-3
- Bubbly Beautiful Kitty-Corn (2024), ISBN 978-1-4197-6877-4
- Holly Jolly Kitty-Corn (2025), ISBN 978-1-4197-6879-8

=== Kitty-Corn Club series ===
The Kitty-Corn Club board books are illustrated by LeUyen Pham.

- Things That Go (2024), ISBN 979-8-8870-7049-0
- Parts of Us (2025), ISBN 979-8-8870-7050-6

=== Dream On series ===
The Dream On series graphic novels are illustrated by Marcela Cespedes.

- Dream On (2025), ISBN 9781250843074
- Dream Big (2026), ISBN 9781250843111

=== Articles ===
- What are we teaching boys when we discourage them from reading books about girls? for The Washington Post

=== Other ===
- Spirit Animals Book 4: Fire and Ice (2014) ISBN 978-0545522465
