= The Goose Girl (novel) =

2003 fantasy novel by Shannon Hale

- First edition cover of The Goose Girl
- Author: Shannon Hale
- Cover artist: Alison Jay (first edition), Juliana Kolesova (photograph cover)
- Language: English
- Series: The Books of Bayern
- Genre: Fantasy novel
- Publisher: Bloomsbury Press
- Publication date: August 8, 2003
- Publication place: United States
- Media type: Print (Hardback & Paperback)
- Pages: 383
- ISBN: 1-58234-843-X
- OCLC: 51042139
- LC Class: PZ8.H134 Go 2003
- Followed by: Enna Burning

The Goose Girl is a fantasy novel by Shannon Hale based on the Brothers Grimm fairy tale of the same title, published by Bloomsbury in 2003. It is Hale's debut novel and the first in her Books of Bayern series. It follows the story of Anidori-Kiladra "Ani" Talianna Isilee (later called "Isi"), Crown Princess of Kildenree, as she travels to the neighboring kingdom of Bayern to wed their crown prince. On the journey, she is usurped by her jealous lady-in-waiting and must prove her true identity as the princess. Critical reception of the novel was mostly positive. The book won the 2003 Josette Frank Award for fiction and has been published in English, Spanish, Hungarian, Dutch, Japanese, and Vietnamese.

== Development ==
While in graduate school at the University of Montana, Hale decided to write a novelization of her favorite fairy tale, The Goose Girl, after a challenge from a friend. She sought to mainly stay "as close to the skeleton of the original tale" as possible while diving deeper into parts of the story that were left unexplained before. Her original manuscript was 80 pages long. It was rewritten some 30 times and rejected by multiple editors before publication.

Hale wanted to create a world that readers could reconcile with reality. The land of Bayern that Ani travels to was "partly inspired by Germany". Hale wrote the novel with both her teenage and adult self in mind as the ideal audience. Both Ani and Enna's friendship and Ani and Geric's romance were inspired by Hale's own relationships.

== Plot ==
When crown princess Anidori-Kiladra Talianna Isilee was born, she did not open her eyes until her aunt held her. Her aunt became her nursemaid and constant companion, nicknaming her Ani and telling her stories about three gifts people have: people-speaking, animal-speaking, and nature-speaking. The aunt has the second ability, and teaches Ani to speak with birds, mainly swans. Ani grows to be more comfortable at the pond than in the palace. The aunt warns Ani that Selia, Ani's lady-in-waiting, has the gift of people-speaking, meaning she is able to convince people to do whatever she wants. When her aunt leaves, Ani is forced to abandon her unique talent. At age sixteen, she devotes herself to preparing to be the next Queen of Kildenree, but finds solace in communicating with her horse, Falada. After her father dies, Ani's mother tells her that, instead of becoming queen, she is to travel to the kingdom of Bayern and marry the crown prince. During the journey, half of the royal guards mutiny and attempt to kill the princess and replace her with Selia, but Ani flees, leaving behind Falada.

After days of walking in the forest and recovering from near starvation, Ani assumes the alias of "Isi", and travels into the capital of Bayern. She soon discovers that Selia has assumed Ani's name and role of princess. Ani finds a job tending the king's geese, and lives among other animal workers to whom she tells stories. After a few hiccups, she learns to use her animal-speaking skills to communicate with the geese. In this time, she slowly discovers her nature-speaking ability: understanding and eventually manipulating wind. Ani also befriends a royal guard named Geric, and soon they begin to develop romantic feelings for each other. One day, Ani's best friend, Enna, discovers her secret identity and swears to help her reclaim the throne when the time comes. Geric tells Ani that the execution of Falada has been planned; she tries to rescue him, but is too late. He later sends her a letter saying he will be unable to see her anymore. Ani continues life as the goose girl, and uses her animal-speaking and wind-speaking abilities to save her geese from thieves. She then learns that Selia has spread a rumor that Kildenree is planning to attack Bayern. Ungolad, Selia's most loyal guard, hunts Ani down and stabs her in the back. She narrowly escapes and flees to the forest, where she heals. It is here that she discovers one of her loyal guards, Talone, has survived, and he accompanies her back to the kingdom. When she returns, she discovers that Enna told the other animal workers Ani's secret, and they rally behind her.

The group rides to the castle where the wedding is to take place. It is here that Ani confronts Selia and learns that the crown prince of Bayern is actually Geric. Selia and Ungolad trap Ani alone, but before they can kill her, an eavesdropping Geric appears with the king in tow after hearing Selia's full confession. A fight breaks out, and Geric, with the help of Ani's wind-speaking, defeats Ungolad. Selia is also captured. Days later, Ani goes before the king and convinces him that Kildenree has no plans to attack Bayern. Geric is impressed by this and Ani's knowledge of Bayern. Now that she is proven to be his true betrothed, they acknowledge their love for each other and happily rule together.

== Critical reception ==
The New York Times praised Hale's expansion of the original Goose Girl fairytale, saying: "In layer upon layer of detail a beautiful coming-of-age story emerges, a tale about learning to rescue yourself rather than falling accidentally into happily-ever-after." Diane Samuels, in a review for The Guardian, wrote that Hale's writing "has energy and can be gripping, but the sheer bulk of words used to elaborate on each detail is a problem." A Publishers Weekly review also cited too much detail as a drawback, but also called The Goose Girl "a satisfying and richly embellished retelling of a classic that communicates values still pertinent to contemporary readers." Kirkus Reviews also remarked that "Hale's first novel is too long by a fair amount," but added that "ensorcelled teen readers, swept up in the romance and the luscious language, probably won't notice." School Library Journal wrote: "Hale's retelling is a wonderfully rich one, full of eloquent description and lovely imagery, and with a complex plot, a large cast of characters, and a strong female protagonist." Booklist also praised Ani's characterization, and called the novel "a fine adventure tale full of danger, suspense, surprising twists, and a satisfying conclusion."

== Awards and nominations ==
- 2003 Josette Frank Award for fiction
- One of the New York City Public Library's 100 Books for Reading and Sharing
- An American Library Association Top 10 Book for Young Adults
- A 2004 Young Adult Library Services Association Teens' Top 10
- 2003 Utah Children's Book Award
- 2003 Utah Speculative Fiction Award
- 2003 AML Award for Young Adult Literature
- Finalist for the Mythopoeic Award
- 2004 Humpty Dumpty Chapter Book Award given by the Mid-South Independent Booksellers Association
- 2005 Beehive Award Nominee
- A 2004 Texas Lone Star Reading List book
- 2006 Garden State Teen Book Award nominee

== Publication history ==
- 2003, US, Bloomsbury Children's Books, ISBN 1-58234-843-X, Pub date 8 August 2003, Hardback
- 2003, UK, Bloomsbury Publishing PLC, ISBN 0-7475-6419-1, Pub date 3 November 2003, Hardback
- 2005, US, Bloomsbury Publishing PLC, ISBN 0-7475-7123-6, Pub date 3 January 2005, Paperback
- 2005, US, Full Cast Audio, ISBN 1-932076-72-7, Audiobook
