= A Traveler's Guide to Space and Time =

Box set by Blind Guardian
- Released: 28 January 2013
- Genre: Power metal, speed metal, progressive metal
- Length: 13:55:02
- Label: Virgin Records/EMI
- Producer: Charlie Bauerfeind, Kalle Trapp, Flemming Rasmussen, Piet Sielck, Blind Guardian

Blind Guardian chronology
Memories of a Time to Come (2012)	A Traveler's Guide to Space and Time (2013)	Beyond the Red Mirror (2015)

A Traveler's Guide to Space and Time is the first box set by German power metal band Blind Guardian. It contains 15 CDs and covers the bands discography during the so-called Virgin years, between 1988 and 2004. Along with seven studio albums, two live albums and one compilation album (all of them remastered in 2012 and some remixed), it also includes Imaginations Through the Looking Glass in audio format, a special edition of Nightfall In Middle-Earth and a CD of demos and rarities. It also came with a 20-page glossy booklet, limited and numbered Blind Guardian art print on special paper and a guitar pick with band logo. It is a strictly limited edition, as only 8000 copies were made worldwide.

== Track listing ==
=== Disc 1: Battalions of Fear ===
Remixed 2007 & lightly adjusted in 2011/2012 / Remastered 2012

No.	Title	Lyrics	Music	Length
1.	"Majesty"	Hansi Kürsch	Hansi Kürsch, André Olbrich	7:29
2.	"Guardian of the Blind"	Kürsch	Kürsch, Olbrich, Marcus Siepen, Thomas Stauch	5:11
3.	"Trial by the Archon"	N/A	Kürsch, Olbrich	1:44
4.	"Wizard's Crown"	Kürsch	Kürsch, Olbrich	3:48
5.	"Run for the Night"	Kürsch	Kürsch, Olbrich	3:34
6.	"The Martyr"	Kürsch	Kürsch, Olbrich	6:15
7.	"Battalions of Fear"	Kürsch	Kürsch, Olbrich	6:06
8.	"By the Gates of Moria"	N/A	Kürsch, Olbrich	2:52
9.	"Gandalf's Rebirth (New 2013 Mix)"	N/A	Kürsch, Olbrich	2:12

=== Disc 2: Follow the Blind ===
Remixed 2007 with a few minor adjustments in 2011 / Remastered 2012

No.	Title	Lyrics	Music	Length
1.	"Inquisition"	N/A	Kürsch, Olbrich, Siepen, Stauch	0:41
2.	"Banish from Sanctuary"	Kürsch	Kürsch, Olbrich, Siepen, Stauch	5:28
3.	"Damned for All Time"	Kürsch	Kürsch, Olbrich, Siepen, Stauch	4:58
4.	"Follow the Blind"	Kürsch	Kürsch, Olbrich, Siepen, Stauch	7:09
5.	"Hall of the King"	Kürsch	Kürsch, Olbrich, Siepen, Stauch	4:16
6.	"Fast to Madness"	Kürsch	Kürsch, Olbrich, Siepen, Stauch	5:59
7.	"Beyond the Ice"	N/A	Kürsch, Olbrich, Siepen, Stauch	3:28
8.	"Valhalla (ft. Kai Hansen, Gamma Ray, ex-Helloween)"	Kürsch	Kürsch, Olbrich, Siepen, Stauch	4:55
9.	"Don't Break the Circle" (Demon cover)	Mal Spooner, Dave Hill	Spooner, Hill	4:20
10.	"Barbara Ann" (The Regents and Beach Boys cover)	Fred Fassert	Fassert	1:42

=== Disc 3: Tales from the Twilight World ===
Digitally Remastered 2012 & New Mix 2012

No.	Title	Lyrics	Music	Length
1.	"Traveler in Time"	Kürsch	Kürsch, Olbrich	6:01
2.	"Welcome to Dying"	Kürsch	Kürsch, Olbrich	4:50
3.	"Weird Dreams"	N/A	Olbrich	1:19
4.	"Lord of the Rings"	Kürsch	Kürsch, Siepen	3:16
5.	"Goodbye My Friend"	Kürsch	Kürsch, Olbrich, Stauch	5:35
6.	"Lost in the Twilight Hall"	Kürsch	Kürsch, Olbrich, Siepen, Stauch	6:03
7.	"Tommyknockers"	Kürsch	Kürsch, Olbrich	5:09
8.	"Altair 4"	Kürsch	Kürsch, Olbrich	1:50
9.	"The Last Candle"	Kürsch	Kürsch, Olbrich	6:02
10.	"Run for the Night (Live)"	Kürsch	Kürsch, Olbrich	3:43

=== Disc 4: Somewhere Far Beyond ===
Digitally Remastered 2012 & New Mix 2012

No.	Title	Lyrics	Music	Length
1.	"Time What Is Time"	Kürsch	Kürsch, Olbrich	5:42
2.	"Journey Through the Dark"	Kürsch	Kürsch, Olbrich	4:48
3.	"Black Chamber"	Kürsch	Kürsch	0:57
4.	"Theatre of Pain"	Kürsch	Kürsch, Olbrich	4:11
5.	"The Quest for Tanelorn"	Kürsch	Kürsch, Olbrich, Siepen, Kai Hansen	5:55
6.	"Ashes to Ashes"	Kürsch	Kürsch, Olbrich	6:00
7.	"The Bard's Song (In the Forest)"	Kürsch	Kürsch, Olbrich	3:10
8.	"The Bard's Song (The Hobbit)"	Kürsch	Kürsch, Olbrich	3:37
9.	"The Piper's Calling"	N/A	Kürsch, Olbrich	0:57
10.	"Somewhere Far Beyond"	Kürsch	Kürsch, Olbrich	7:32
11.	"Spread Your Wings" (Queen cover)	John Deacon	Deacon	4:28
12.	"Trial by Fire" (Satan cover)	Russ Tippins	Tippins	3:43
13.	"Theatre of Pain (Classic version)"	Kürsch	Kürsch, Olbrich, Mathias Wiesner	4:11

=== Disc 5: Tokyo Tales ===
Original 1993 Mix, Digitally Remastered 2012

No.	Title	Lyrics	Music	Length
1.	"Inquisition"	N/A	Kürsch, Olbrich, Siepen, Stauch	0:49
2.	"Banish from Sanctuary"	Kürsch	Kürsch, Olbrich, Siepen, Stauch	6:13
3.	"Journey Through the Dark"	Kürsch	Kürsch, Olbrich	5:12
4.	"Traveler in Time"	Kürsch	Kürsch, Olbrich	6:33
5.	"The Quest for Tanelorn"	Kürsch	Kürsch, Olbrich, Siepen, Hansen	6:02
6.	"Goodbye My Friend"	Kürsch	Kürsch, Olbrich, Stauch	6:27
7.	"Time What Is Time"	Kürsch	Kürsch, Olbrich	6:41
8.	"Majesty"	Kürsch	Kürsch, Olbrich	7:50
9.	"Valhalla"	Kürsch	Kürsch, Olbrich, Siepen, Stauch	6:08
10.	"Welcome to Dying"	Kürsch	Kürsch, Olbrich	5:55
11.	"Lost in the Twilight Hall"	Kürsch	Kürsch, Olbrich, Siepen, Stauch	7:25
12.	"Barbara Ann"	Fassert	Fassert	2:56

=== Disc 6: Imaginations from the Other Side ===
Digitally Remastered 2012 & New Mix 2012

No.	Title	Lyrics	Music	Length
1.	"Imaginations from the Other Side"	Kürsch	Kürsch, Olbrich	7:10
2.	"I'm Alive"	Kürsch	Kürsch, Olbrich	5:31
3.	"A Past and Future Secret"	Kürsch	Kürsch, Olbrich	3:43
4.	"The Script for My Requiem"	Kürsch	Kürsch, Olbrich	6:54
5.	"Mordred's Song"	Kürsch	Kürsch, Olbrich	5:27
6.	"Born in a Mourning Hall"	Kürsch	Kürsch, Olbrich	5:14
7.	"Bright Eyes"	Kürsch	Kürsch, Olbrich	5:14
8.	"Another Holy War"	Kürsch	Kürsch, Olbrich	4:35
9.	"And the Story Ends"	Kürsch	Kürsch, Olbrich	5:57

=== Disc 7: The Forgotten Tales ===
Original Mixes Digitally Remastered 2012

No.	Title	Lyrics	Music	Length
1.	"Mr. Sandman" (The Chordettes cover)	Pat Ballard	Ballard	2:09
2.	"Surfin' U.S.A." (The Beach Boys cover)	Brian Wilson	Chuck Berry	2:23
3.	"Bright Eyes (Acoustic version)"	Kürsch	Kürsch, Olbrich	4:20
4.	"Lord of the Rings (Orchestral version)"	Kürsch	Kürsch, Siepen	3:54
5.	"The Wizard" (Uriah Heep cover)	Ken Hensley	Hensley	3:15
6.	"Spread Your Wings" (Queen cover)	Deacon	Deacon	4:13
7.	"Mordred's Song (Acoustic version)"	Kürsch	Kürsch, Olbrich	5:15
8.	"Black Chamber (Orchestral version)"	Kürsch	Kürsch	1:15
9.	"The Bard's Song (Live)"	Kürsch	Kürsch, Olbrich	4:11
10.	"Barbara Ann/Long Tall Sally" (The Regents/Little Richard cover)	Fassert, Richard Penniman, Entoris Johnson, Robert Blackwell	Fassert, Penniman, Johnson, Blackwell	1:43
11.	"A Past and Future Secret"	Kürsch	Kürsch, Olbrich	3:46
12.	"To France" (Mike Oldfield cover)	Mike Oldfield	Oldfield	4:40
13.	"Theatre of Pain (Orchestral version)"	N/A	Kürsch, Olbrich, Wiesner	4:16

=== Disc 8: Nightfall in Middle-Earth ===
Digitally Remastered 2012 & New Mix 2012

No.	Title	Lyrics	Music	Length
1.	"War of Wrath"	Kürsch	Kürsch, Olbrich	1:50
2.	"Into the Storm"	Kürsch	Kürsch, Olbrich	4:24
3.	"Lammoth"	N/A	Kürsch, Olbrich	0:28
4.	"Nightfall"	Kürsch	Kürsch, Olbrich	5:32
5.	"The Minstrel"	Kürsch	Kürsch, Olbrich	0:31
6.	"The Curse of Fëanor"	Kürsch	Kürsch, Olbrich, Stauch, Siepen	5:41
7.	"Captured"	Kürsch	Kürsch, Olbrich	0:26
8.	"Blood Tears"	Kürsch	Kürsch, Olbrich	5:20
9.	"Mirror Mirror"	Kürsch	Kürsch, Olbrich	5:06
10.	"Face the Truth"	Kürsch	Kürsch, Olbrich	0:27
11.	"Noldor (Dead Winter Reigns)"	Kürsch	Kürsch, Olbrich	6:49
12.	"Battle of Sudden Flame"	Kürsch	Kürsch, Olbrich	0:42
13.	"Time Stands Still (At the Iron Hill)"	Kürsch	Kürsch, Olbrich	4:54
14.	"The Dark Elf"	Kürsch	Kürsch, Olbrich	0:23
15.	"Thorn"	Kürsch	Kürsch, Olbrich	6:17
16.	"The Eldar"	Kürsch	Kürsch, Olbrich, Michael Schüren	3:38
17.	"Nom the Wise"	Kürsch	Kürsch, Olbrich	0:34
18.	"When Sorrow Sang"	Kürsch	Kürsch, Olbrich	4:25
19.	"Out on the Water"	Kürsch	Kürsch, Olbrich	0:44
20.	"The Steadfast"	Kürsch	Kürsch, Olbrich	0:21
21.	"A Dark Passage"	Kürsch	Kürsch, Olbrich	6:00
22.	"Final Chapter (Thus Ends...)"	Kürsch	Kürsch, Olbrich	0:51

=== Disc 9: A Night at the Opera ===
Digitally Remastered 2012 & New Mix 2012

No.	Title	Lyrics	Music	Length
1.	"Precious Jerusalem"	Kürsch	Kürsch, Olbrich	6:19
2.	"Battlefield"	Kürsch	Kürsch, Olbrich, Stauch	5:35
3.	"Under the Ice"	Kürsch	Kürsch, Olbrich	5:44
4.	"Sadly Sings Destiny"	Kürsch	Kürsch, Olbrich	6:02
5.	"The Maiden and the Minstrel Knight"	Kürsch	Kürsch, Olbrich	5:28
6.	"Wait for an Answer"	Kürsch	Kürsch, Olbrich	6:28
7.	"The Soulforged"	Kürsch	Kürsch, Olbrich, Stauch	5:16
8.	"Age of False Innocence"	Kürsch	Kürsch, Olbrich	6:03
9.	"Punishment Divine"	Kürsch	Kürsch, Olbrich	5:39
10.	"And Then There Was Silence"	Kürsch	Kürsch, Olbrich	14:05

=== Disc 10: Live (CD 1) ===
Digitally Remastered 2012

No.	Title	Lyrics	Music	Length
1.	"War of Wrath"	Kürsch	Kürsch, Olbrich	1:54
2.	"Into the Storm"	Kürsch	Kürsch, Olbrich	4:52
3.	"Welcome to Dying"	Kürsch	Kürsch, Olbrich	5:28
4.	"Nightfall"	Kürsch	Kürsch, Olbrich	6:20
5.	"The Script for My Requiem"	Kürsch	Kürsch, Olbrich	6:38
6.	"Harvest of Sorrow"	Kürsch	Kürsch, Siepen, Stauch	3:56
7.	"The Soulforged"	Kürsch	Kürsch, Olbrich, Stauch	6:03
8.	"Valhalla"	Kürsch	Kürsch, Olbrich, Siepen, Stauch	8:12
9.	"Majesty"	Kürsch	Kürsch, Olbrich	8:19
10.	"Mordred's Song"	Kürsch	Kürsch, Olbrich	6:46
11.	"Born in a Mourning Hall"	Kürsch	Kürsch, Olbrich	5:57

=== Disc 11: Live (CD 2) ===
Digitally Remastered 2012

No.	Title	Lyrics	Music	Length
1.	"Under the Ice"	Kürsch	Kürsch, Olbrich	6:14
2.	"Bright Eyes"	Kürsch	Kürsch, Olbrich	5:26
3.	"Punishment Divine"	Kürsch	Kürsch, Olbrich	6:21
4.	"The Bard's Song (In the Forest)"	Kürsch	Kürsch, Olbrich	7:48
5.	"Imaginations from the Other Side"	Kürsch	Kürsch, Olbrich	9:40
6.	"Lost in the Twilight Hall"	Kürsch	Kürsch, Olbrich, Siepen, Stauch	7:09
7.	"A Past and Future Secret"	Kürsch	Kürsch, Olbrich	4:31
8.	"Time Stands Still (At the Iron Hill)"	Kürsch	Kürsch, Olbrich	5:52
9.	"Journey Through the Dark"	Kürsch	Kürsch, Olbrich	5:43
10.	"Lord of the Rings"	Kürsch	Kürsch, Siepen	4:35
11.	"Mirror Mirror"	Kürsch	Kürsch, Olbrich	6:06

=== Disc 12: Imaginations Through the Looking Glass - Live in Coburg, 2003 (CD 1) ===
Digitally Remastered 2012

No.	Title	Lyrics	Music	Length
1.	"War of Wrath"	Kürsch	Kürsch, Olbrich	1:10
2.	"Time Stands Still (At the Iron Hill)"	Kürsch	Kürsch, Olbrich	5:16
3.	"Banish from Sanctuary"	Kürsch	Kürsch, Olbrich, Siepen, Stauch	6:09
4.	"Nightfall"	Kürsch	Kürsch, Olbrich	5:49
5.	"The Script for My Requiem"	Kürsch	Kürsch, Olbrich	6:11
6.	"Valhalla"	Kürsch	Kürsch, Olbrich, Siepen, Stauch	8:28
7.	"A Past and Future Secret"	Kürsch	Kürsch, Olbrich	4:02
8.	"Punishment Divine"	Kürsch	Kürsch, Olbrich	6:07
9.	"Mordred's Song"	Kürsch	Kürsch, Olbrich	5:53
10.	"The Last Candle"	Kürsch	Kürsch, Siepen	7:33
11.	"Bright Eyes"	Kürsch	Kürsch, Olbrich	5:23

=== Disc 13: Imaginations Through the Looking Glass - Live in Coburg, 2003 (CD 2) ===
Digitally Remastered 2012

No.	Title	Lyrics	Music	Length
1.	"Lord of the Rings"	Kürsch	Kürsch, Siepen	4:41
2.	"I'm Alive"	Kürsch	Kürsch, Olbrich	5:46
3.	"Another Holy War"	Kürsch	Kürsch, Olbrich	5:00
4.	"And Then There Was Silence"	Kürsch	Kürsch, Olbrich	13:02
5.	"The Piper's Calling/Somewhere Far Beyond"	Kürsch	Kürsch, Olbrich	8:59
6.	"The Bard's Song (In the Forest)"	Kürsch	Kürsch, Olbrich	3:38
7.	"Imaginations from the Other Side"	Kürsch	Kürsch, Olbrich	7:58
8.	"And the Story Ends"	Kürsch	Kürsch, Olbrich	6:14
9.	"Mirror Mirror"	Kürsch	Kürsch, Olbrich	6:56

=== Disc 14: Nightfall in Middle-Earth – Special Edition ===
Digitally Remastered 2012 & New Mix 2012

No.	Title	Lyrics	Music	Length
1.	"Into the Storm"	Kürsch	Kürsch, Olbrich	4:27
2.	"Nightfall"	Kürsch	Kürsch, Olbrich	5:34
3.	"The Curse of Fëanor"	Kürsch	Kürsch, Olbrich, Stauch, Siepen	5:44
4.	"Blood Tears (New Vocal Mix 2012)"	Kürsch	Kürsch, Olbrich	5:24
5.	"Mirror Mirror"	Kürsch	Kürsch, Olbrich	5:08
6.	"Noldor (Dead Winter Reigns)"	Kürsch	Kürsch, Olbrich	6:52
7.	"Time Stands Still (At the Iron Hill)"	Kürsch	Kürsch, Olbrich	4:56
8.	"Thorn"	Kürsch	Kürsch, Olbrich	6:18
9.	"The Eldar"	Kürsch	Kürsch, Olbrich, Michael Schüren	3:45
10.	"When Sorrow Sang"	Kürsch	Kürsch, Olbrich	4:28
11.	"A Dark Passage"	Kürsch	Kürsch, Olbrich	6:10

=== Disc 15: An Extraordinary Tale (Live Rarities & Demos) ===
Digitally Remastered 2012

No.	Title	Lyrics	Music	Length
1.	"Welcome to Dying (Demo)"	Kürsch	Kürsch, Olbrich	4:43
2.	"Lord of the Rings (Demo)"	Kürsch	Kürsch, Siepen	2:47
3.	"The Bard's Song (In The Forest) (Demo)"	Kürsch	Kürsch, Olbrich	2:58
4.	"The Bard's Song (The Hobbit) (Demo)"	Kürsch	Kürsch, Olbrich	3:45
5.	"Theatre of Pain (Demo)"	Kürsch	Kürsch, Olbrich	4:06
6.	"Trial by Fire (Demo)"	Tippins	Tippins	3:45
7.	"The Quest for Tanelorn (Extended version)"	Kürsch	Kürsch, Olbrich, Siepen, Hansen	6:42
8.	"Harvest of Sorrow (2007 Remaster)"	Kürsch	Kürsch, Siepen, Stauch	3:39
9.	"I'm Alive (Demo)"	Kürsch	Kürsch, Olbrich	5:19

== Personnel ==
=== Band members ===
- Hansi Kürsch: vocals, bass (discs 1–7, 15), backing vocals (8–9,14)
- André Olbrich: lead guitar, rhythm guitar (4,6–9), acoustic guitar (4,6–13), backing vocals (1–5,10–13,15)
- Marcus Siepen: rhythm guitar, acoustic guitar (4,10–13), backing vocals (1–5,10–13,15)
- Thomas Stauch: drums, percussion

=== Guest musicians ===
- Ronnie Atkins: backing vocals (6–7)
- Pad Bender: keyboards (9), effects (9)
- Norman Eshley: narration (8)
- Douglas Fielding: narration (8)
- Hans-Peter Frey: drums (1)
- Thomas Hackmann: backing vocals (2–3,6–9,14)
- Kai Hansen: vocals (2–3), lead guitar (2–4), backing vocals (3)
- Alex Holzwarth: drums (10–11)
- Oliver Holzwarth: bass (8–14), backing vocals (10–13)
- Billy King: backing vocals (4,6–9,14)
- Rolf Köhler: vocals (2,7), backing vocals (1–4,6–9,14)
- Aman Malek: backing vocals (2,7)
- Jacob Moth: acoustic guitar (6–7)
- Sascha Pierro: keyboards (9), effects (9)
- Peter Rübsam: bagpipes (4)
- Boris Schmidt: keyboards (9), effects (9)
- Olaf Senkbeil: backing vocals (8–9,14)
- Michael Shüren: piano (7–9,14), keyboards (10–13), backing vocals (10–13)
- Otto Sidenius: organ (7)
- Piet Sielck: backing vocals (3,7), effects (3–4,7), guitars (4)
- Christof Theisen: rhythm guitar (1)
- Kalle Trapp: vocals (2,7), lead guitar (2,7), backing vocals (3–4,7)
- Michael Voss: backing vocals (1)
- Matthias Wiesner: keyboards (2–4,8–9,14) effects (3–4,6–9,14) bass (4,7)
- Stefan Will: piano (4,7)
- Marc Zee: keyboards (5), backing vocals (5)
- Max Zelzner: flutes (8)

== Charts ==
Chart (2013)	Peak position
German Albums (Offizielle Top 100)	8
