= Live (Blind Guardian album) =

Live album by Blind Guardian
- Released: 20 May 2003
- Recorded: Blind Guardian World Tour 2002/2003
- Genre: Power metal, speed metal
- Length: 2:13:52
- Label: Virgin/Century Media
- Producer: Charlie Bauerfeind

Blind Guardian live chronology
Tokyo Tales (1993)	Live (2003)	Live Beyond the Spheres (2017)

Live is the second live album by German power metal band Blind Guardian. It was recorded during the Blind Guardian World Tour 2002/2003 in Tokyo, Stockholm, Lichtenfels, Venice, Düsseldorf, Milan, Florence, Barcelona, San Sebastián, Avilés, Madrid, Granada, Valencia, Bremen, Moscow, Hamburg, Berlin, Munich, Stuttgart.

== Track listing ==
=== Disc one ===
1. "War of Wrath" (from Nightfall in Middle-Earth) – 1:54
2. "Into the Storm" (from Nightfall in Middle-Earth) – 4:52
3. "Welcome to Dying" (from Tales from the Twilight World) – 5:28
4. "Nightfall" (from Nightfall in Middle-Earth) – 6:20
5. "The Script for my Requiem" (from Imaginations from the Other Side) – 6:38
6. "Harvest of Sorrow" (from A Night at the Opera) – 3:56
7. "The Soulforged" (from A Night at the Opera) – 6:03
8. "Valhalla" (from Follow the Blind) – 8:12
9. "Majesty" (from Battalions of Fear) – 8:19
10. "Mordred's Song" (from Imaginations from the Other Side) – 6:46
11. "Born in a Mourning Hall" (from Imaginations from the Other Side) – 5:57

=== Disc two ===
1. "Under the Ice" (from A Night at the Opera) – 6:15
2. "Bright Eyes" (from Imaginations from the Other Side) – 5:26
3. "Punishment Divine" (from A Night at the Opera) – 6:21
4. "The Bard's Song (In the Forest)" (from Somewhere Far Beyond) – 7:48
5. "Imaginations from the Other Side" (from Imaginations from the Other Side) – 9:40
6. "Lost in the Twilight Hall" (from Tales from the Twilight World) – 7:09
7. "A Past and Future Secret" (from Imaginations from the Other Side) – 4:31
8. "Time Stands Still (At the Iron Hill)" (from Nightfall in Middle-Earth) – 5:52
9. "Journey Through the Dark" (from Somewhere Far Beyond) – 5:43
10. "Lord of the Rings" (from Tales from the Twilight World) – 4:34
11. "Mirror Mirror" (from Nightfall in Middle-Earth) – 6:06

=== Outtakes ===
In 2004, outtakes for this live album (a third disc, in essence) were released in MP3 format via the band website, using the then-new BitTorrent technology.

=== Protection ===
The European version, released by Virgin is copy protected whereas the US release by Century Media is not.

== Band members ==
- Hansi Kürsch – vocals
- André Olbrich – lead guitars and backing vocals
- Marcus Siepen – rhythm guitars and backing vocals
- Thomas "Thomen" Stauch – drums

== Guest musicians ==
- Oliver Holzwarth – bass and backing vocals
- Michael Schüren – keyboards and backing vocals
- Alex Holzwarth – drums

== Personnel ==
- Charlie Bauerfeind – production, mixing
- Alexander "Chester" Kalb – recording
- Andreas Marschall – cover painting
- Nikolay "Dr. Venom" Simkin – artwork
- Dennis "Sir" Kostroman – artwork
- Axel Jusseit – photography
- Hans Martin Issler – photography
- Buffo Schnädelbach – photography
- Sascha Wischnewski – photography

== Charts ==
Chart (2003)	Peak position
French Albums (SNEP)	136
German Albums (Offizielle Top 100)	16
Italian Albums (FIMI)	42
Japanese Albums (Oricon)	115
