= Imaginations Through the Looking Glass =

Video by Blind Guardian
- Released: 14 June 2004
- Recorded: 16–17 June 2003
- Venue: Blind Guardian Festival, Coburg, Germany
- Genre: Power metal

Imaginations Through the Looking Glass is the first video album by German power metal band Blind Guardian.

The band intended to record a DVD since early 1998, however, due to the band's high requirements, no existing metal festival had been considered suitable. Instead, they decided to create their own festival, back in their homeland. The First Blind Guardian Festival was held in Coburg, Germany, on 16–17 June 2003; it lasted two days, with the band playing during both nights.

The entire show was professionally recorded and subsequently released on DVD on 14 June 2004. The cover art was painted by Leo Hao.

== Content ==
The show had been very well prepared for the recording, with complex lighting and pyrotechnic effects set up to assist the musicians in creating the atmosphere. Blind Guardian's performance is generally considered excellent, and the degree of the audience's involvement was surprising even to the band members themselves. This is especially visible when the crowd continued to sing the chorus of "Valhalla" after the song was well over, stopping to cheer, and then starting to sing again, joined by an impromptu drum beat.

The setlist was partly based on a poll conducted on the band's website, which (combined with the amount of time the band had) led to a varied set with classics like "The Bard's Song (In the Forest)" but also some rarely played songs such as "Somewhere Far Beyond".

There are two (two-layer) DVDs in the release; the first one contains the show itself, with 20 tracks and approximately 125 minutes of running time. Disc 2 contains extra material, including an interview with the band and four bonus songs, recorded in previous tours. The set has a typical Blind Guardian fantasy-style artwork painted by Leo Hao, mixed with photos from the show, with several humorous elements included such as a picture of Legolas, Gimli and Gollum buying tickets for the concert.

== Track listing ==
=== Disc 1 ===
1. War of Wrath
2. Time Stands Still
3. Banish from Sanctuary
4. Nightfall
5. The Script for My Requiem
6. Valhalla
7. A Past and Future Secret
8. Punishment Divine
9. Mordred's Song
10. The Last Candle
11. Bright Eyes
12. Lord of the Rings
13. I'm Alive
14. Another Holy War
15. And Then There Was Silence
16. Somewhere Far Beyond
17. The Bard's Song (In the Forest)
18. Imaginations from the Other Side
19. And the Story Ends
20. Mirror Mirror

=== Disc 2 ===
1. Interview with Blind Guardian
2. Slideshow
3. The Making of The B.G. Festival Coburg 2003
4. Bonus Songs:
  - Majesty
  - Into the Storm
  - Welcome to Dying
  - Lost in the Twilight Hall

== Personnel ==
- Hansi Kürsch – vocals
- André Olbrich – guitars
- Marcus Siepen – guitars
- Thomen Stauch – drums
- Oliver Holzwarth – bass (touring member)
- Michael "Mi" Schüren – keyboards (touring member)

== Chart performance ==
Imaginations Through the Looking Glass reached #27 in Germany.

== Certifications ==
Region	Certification	Certified units/sales
Germany (BVMI)	Gold	25,000^{^}
^{^} Shipments figures based on certification alone.
