= Legacy of the Dark Lands =

Studio album by Blind Guardian Twilight Orchestra
- Released: 8 November 2019
- Recorded: 2018–2019
- Genre: Orchestral; progressive rock
- Length: 75:11
- Label: Nuclear Blast
- Producer: André Olbrich, Charlie Bauerfeind, Hansi Kürsch

Blind Guardian Twilight Orchestra chronology
Beyond the Red Mirror (2015)	Legacy of the Dark Lands (2019)	The God Machine (2022)

Legacy of the Dark Lands is the eleventh studio album by the German power metal band Blind Guardian, released on 8 November 2019 through Nuclear Blast. It marks a departure from all previous works, as the only instruments performed are those of the Prague Philharmonic Orchestra, with singer Hansi Kürsch being the only member of the band to perform on the album; due to this, the album is credited to the "Blind Guardian Twilight Orchestra" instead of Blind Guardian.

A project worked on by Kürsch and André Olbrich since 1996, it is a concept album set in the 17th century during the Thirty Years' War, and based on the character of Solomon Kane created by Robert E. Howard in 1928; in Legacy of the Dark Lands, Kane's daughter, Aenlin, is looking for her father's legacy in the Habsburg Empire. A tie-in prequel novel, titled The Dark Lands and written by Markus Heitz, was published on 1 March 2019. Due to the limited performing line-up, this is Blind Guardian's first album without guitarist Marcus Siepen, and the first album without drummer Frederik Ehmke since 2002's A Night at the Opera; it is also the first album on which Olbrich doesn't perform guitars, although he was still involved as songwriter and producer.

== Production ==
Hansi Kürsch and André Olbrich first conceived the idea for an orchestral album in 1996, when Blind Guardian started to use orchestrations as part of their music. Kürsch stated: "When we started working on it we never would have guessed that we would be working on it for such a long time. We started out rather innocently and very unaware of what to expect – and suddenly, the project turned into this huge monster." Olbrich stated: "When I got stuck during writing a Blind Guardian record, I would simply work on the orchestra project, and it cleared my mind fairly quickly. A lot of things we learned for this album were used on the last Blind Guardian records. A song like "And Then There Was Silence", for example, would never have been possible without this project."

Due to the challenge of singing with an orchestra instead of with the band's line-up, Kürsch recorded three versions of each song on the album, going from his traditional singing in Blind Guardian to a more classical approach; he also tried different lyrics each time, to find "which words would sound best" with which version.

The Prague Philharmonic Orchestra performed the instruments on the album. Actors Norman Eshley and Douglas Fielding provided narration on the album, the second time they did so on a Blind Guardian album after 1998's Nightfall in Middle-Earth; Legacy of the Dark Lands was a posthumous release for Fielding, who died on 29 June 2019.

German author Markus Heitz, who helped develop the story for the album, also wrote a tie-in prequel dark fantasy novel titled ''The Dark Lands (Die Dunklen Lande), released on 1 March 2019. Although the printed version was only made available in German, an e-book version in English was made available the following October. The novel, set in 1629 during the Thirty Years' War, follows a character named Aenlin Kane, who travels to Hamburg with her Persian friend Tahmina in search of the heritage of her father, Solomon Kane. The two are hired by the Danish West India Company, and their group, led by a man named Nicolas, must face demons trying to use the conflict for their advantage.

== Track listing ==
All tracks are written by André Olbrich and Hansi Kürsch.

No.	Title	Length
1.	"1618 Ouverture"	2:37
2.	"The Gathering"	1:22
3.	"War Feeds War"	5:05
4.	"Comets and Prophecies"	1:12
5.	"Dark Cloud's Rising"	5:11
6.	"The Ritual"	0:52
7.	"In the Underworld"	5:50
8.	"A Secret Society"	0:25
9.	"The Great Ordeal"	4:55
10.	"Bez"	0:22
11.	"In the Red Dwarf's Tower"	7:03
12.	"Into the Battle"	0:22
13.	"Treason"	4:21
14.	"Between the Realms"	0:48
15.	"Point of No Return"	6:37
16.	"The White Horseman"	0:50
17.	"Nephilim"	5:06
18.	"Trial and Coronation"	0:27
19.	"Harvester of Souls"	7:17
20.	"Conquest Is Over"	1:21
21.	"This Storm"	4:47
22.	"The Great Assault"	0:27
23.	"Beyond the Wall"	7:07
24.	"A New Beginning"	0:47
Total length:		75:11

== Personnel ==
- Hansi Kürsch – vocals, production
- Prague Philharmonic Orchestra – orchestra
- Norman Eshley – narration
- Tom Butcher - narration
- Douglas Fielding – narration
- André Olbrich – production
- Charlie Bauerfeind – production, mixing

== Charts ==
Chart (2019)	Peak position
Austrian Albums (Ö3 Austria)	22
Belgian Albums (Ultratop Flanders)	169
Belgian Albums (Ultratop Wallonia)	160
French Albums (SNEP)	174
German Albums (Offizielle Top 100)	7
Italian Albums (FIMI)	49
Scottish Albums (OCC)	77
Spanish Albums (PROMUSICAE)	18
Swiss Albums (Schweizer Hitparade)	24
UK Independent Albums (OCC)	24
UK Rock & Metal Albums (OCC)	5
