= Somewhere Far Beyond =

Studio album by Blind Guardian
- Released: 29 June 1992
- Recorded: February–May 1992
- Studio: Karo Studios
- Genres: Power metal; speed metal
- Length: 43:20; 55:28 (remastered version)
- Label: Virgin/Century Media
- Producer: Kalle Trapp

Blind Guardian chronology
Tales from the Twilight World (1990)	Somewhere Far Beyond (1992)	Imaginations from the Other Side (1995)

Singles from Somewhere Far Beyond
- 1. "The Bard's Song (In the Forest)" Released: 5 May 2003

Professional ratings
Review scores
Source	Rating
AllMusic	3/5 stars
Rock Hard	(9.5/10)

Somewhere Far Beyond is the fourth studio album by the German power metal band Blind Guardian. It was released in 1992 and produced by Kalle Trapp. The cover artwork was created by Andreas Marschall, who also drew the artwork for other Blind Guardian's releases (Tales from the Twilight World, Nightfall in Middle-Earth, etc.). The album saw the band creating its own original sound, while still employing most of their speed/power metal techniques.

The cover art and the two "Bard's Songs" gave the band its nickname "The Bards". The use of the nickname has been also extended to the fans of the group, Circle of the Bards being the now defunct fan club, and Hansi Kürsch frequently calling the fans "Bards".

"The Piper's Calling" contains the first three parts of the Great Highland Bagpipe 2/4 March, "The 79th's Farewell to Gibraltar", written by Pipe Major John MacDonald of the 79th Regiment of Foot (Cameronian Volunteers). Part of this composition also appears as a section of the title track, this time played on a different type of bagpipe.

The album was acclaimed by power metal fans all across Europe and especially Japan, allowing them to tour for the first time outside Germany. The tour in the Far East led to the band's first live album, Tokyo Tales.

Somewhere Far Beyond was remastered and re-released, with bonus tracks, on 15 June 2007. The album was again re-released and also remixed and remastered as part of A Traveler's Guide to Space and Time boxset.

== Track listing ==
No.	Title	Writer(s)	Length
1.	"Time What Is Time"	Hansi Kürsch, André Olbrich	5:42
2.	"Journey Through the Dark"	Kürsch, Olbrich	4:45
3.	"Black Chamber"	Kürsch	0:56
4.	"Theatre of Pain"	Kürsch, Olbrich	4:15
5.	"The Quest for Tanelorn"	Kürsch, Olbrich, Marcus Siepen, Kai Hansen	5:53
6.	"Ashes to Ashes"	Kürsch, Olbrich	5:58
7.	"The Bard's Song – In the Forest"	Kürsch, Olbrich	3:09
8.	"The Bard's Song – The Hobbit"	Kürsch, Olbrich	3:52
9.	"The Piper's Calling" (instrumental)	Kürsch, Olbrich	0:58
10.	"Somewhere Far Beyond"	Kürsch, Olbrich	7:28

Bonus tracks^{†}
No.	Title	Writer(s)	Length
11.	"Spread Your Wings" (Queen cover)	John Deacon	4:13
12.	"Trial by Fire" (Satan cover)	Russ Tippins	3:42
13.	"Theatre of Pain (Classic Version)"	Kürsch, Olbrich, Mathias Wiesner	4:13

2007 re-release bonus tracks
No.	Title	Writer(s)	Length
14.	"Ashes to Ashes (Demo Version)"	Kürsch, Olbrich	5:51
15.	"Time What Is Time (Demo Version)"	Kürsch, Olbrich	5:35

^†The first set of bonus tracks are featured on all releases other than the vinyl LP. The 2007 re-release includes all of these tracks, although they are not listed as bonus tracks. It does not include the original re-release bonus tracks.

== Lyrical references ==
- "Time What Is Time" is about the film Blade Runner from the perspective of a Replicant.
- "Journey Through the Dark" is about Jhary a-Conel, a bard and a companion of the Eternal Champion, from the books by Michael Moorcock.
- "Black Chamber" deals with someone finding himself in the Black Lodge from Twin Peaks and facing a dark fate.
- "The Quest for Tanelorn" is about the Eternal Champion's search for a city called Tanelorn, a fictional city in The Multiverse of Michael Moorcock's stories.
- "Ashes to Ashes" deals with the death of Hansi's father.
- "The Bard's Song – In the Forest" is inspired by the computer game The Bard's Tale.
- "The Bard's Song – The Hobbit" is based on J. R. R. Tolkien's The Hobbit.
- "Somewhere Far Beyond" is a retelling of Stephen King's The Dark Tower: The Gunslinger and The Drawing of the Three.
- "Trial by Fire" is about the atomic bombings of Hiroshima and Nagasaki. It's a cover of the heavy metal band Satan.

== Personnel ==
Blind Guardian

- Hansi Kürsch – lead vocals, bass
- André Olbrich – lead, rhythm and acoustic guitar, backing vocals
- Marcus Siepen – rhythm and acoustic guitars, backing vocals
- Thomas "Thomen" Stauch – drums

Guest musicians

- Piet Sielck –effects, guitars
- Mathias Wiesner – effects, keyboards and bass on "Spread Your Wings"
- Rolf Köhler, Billy King and Kalle Trapp – backing vocals
- Stefan Will – piano
- Peter Rübsam – Scottish and Irish bagpipes
- Kai Hansen – lead guitar on "The Quest for Tanelorn"

Production and design

- Kalle Trapp – producing, mixing, recording
- Piet Sielck – second engineer
- Andreas Marschall/Becker — Derouet Hamburg – cover art
- Tom Nagy – photo
- a•r•t•p•o•o•l – graphics

== Charts ==
1992 chart performance for Somewhere Far Beyond
Chart (1992)	Peak position
German Albums (Offizielle Top 100)	65
Japanese Albums (Oricon)	15

2018 chart performance for Somewhere Far Beyond
Chart (2018)	Peak position
German Albums (Offizielle Top 100)	36

2024 chart performance for Somewhere Far Beyond
Chart (2024)	Peak position
Austrian Albums (Ö3 Austria)	39
German Albums (Offizielle Top 100)	14
Swiss Albums (Schweizer Hitparade)	21
