= The Forgotten Tales =

Compilation album by Blind Guardian
- Released: 16 April 1996
- Recorded: Sweet Silence Studios; Twilight Hall Studios; Karo Studios; Central Studio
- Genre: Power metal
- Length: 45:32
- Label: Virgin
- Producer: Flemming Rasmussen; Kalle Trapp; Piet Sielck; Blind Guardian

Blind Guardian chronology
The Forgotten Tales (1996)	Memories of a Time to Come (2012)

Singles from The Forgotten Tales
- 1. "Mr. Sandman" Released: 7 February 1996

The Forgotten Tales is the first compilation album by German power metal band Blind Guardian. It was published in 1996. The cover artwork was created by Andreas Marschall. "'The Forgotten Tales'" contains several cover versions of popular songs, including "Mr. Sandman", "Surfin' U.S.A.", and "Spread Your Wings" as well as alternate versions of the band's previous works. Remastered and re-released on 15 June 2007, with bonus tracks and videos.

Professional ratings
Review scores
Source	Rating
AllMusic	link

== Track listing ==
No.	Title	Writer(s)	Length
1.	"Mr. Sandman" (The Chordettes cover)	Pat Ballard	2:09
2.	"Surfin' U.S.A." (The Beach Boys cover)	Brian Wilson, Chuck Berry	2:23
3.	"Bright Eyes" (Acoustic version)	André Olbrich, Hansi Kürsch	4:20
4.	"Lord of the Rings" (Orchestral version)	Kürsch, Marcus Siepen	3:55
5.	"The Wizard" (Uriah Heep cover)	Ken Hensley, Mark Clarke	3:16
6.	"Spread Your Wings" (Queen cover)	John Deacon	4:14
7.	"Mordred's Song" (Acoustic version)	Olbrich, Kürsch	5:16
8.	"Black Chamber" (Orchestral version)	Kürsch	1:15
9.	"The Bard's Song – In the Forest" (Live)	Olbrich, Kürsch	4:11
10.	"Barbara Ann/Long Tall Sally" (The Regents/Little Richard covers)	Fred Fassert/Enotris Johnson, Robert Blackwell, Richard Penniman	1:43
11.	"A Past and Future Secret"	Olbrich, Kürsch	3:47
12.	"To France" (Mike Oldfield cover)	Mike Oldfield	4:40
13.	"Theatre of Pain" (Orchestral version)	Olbrich, Kürsch, Mathias Wiesner	4:15
Total length:			45:32

2007 Re-release Bonus Tracks
No.	Title	Writer(s)	Length
14.	"Hallelujah" (Deep Purple cover)	Roger Greenaway, Roger Cook	3:18
15.	"Beyond the Realms of Death" (Judas Priest cover)	Rob Halford, Les Binks	7:02
16.	"Don't Talk to Strangers" (Dio cover)	Ronnie James Dio	4:49
17.	"Mr. Sandman" (Video)	Pat Ballard
18.	"The Bard's Song" (Video)	Olbrich, Kürsch

2019 Re-release Bonus Tracks
No.	Title	Writer(s)	Length
14.	"All the King's Horses"	Kürsch, Siepen	4:09
15.	"Dream a Little Dream of Me" (Ozzie Nelson cover)	Gus Kahn, Fabian Andre, Wilbur Schwandt	3:22
16.	"Don't Talk to Strangers" (Dio cover)	Ronnie James Dio	4:49
17.	"Beyond the Realms of Death" (Judas Priest cover)	Rob Halford, Les Binks	7:02
18.	"Hallelujah" (Deep Purple cover)	Roger Greenaway, Roger Cook	3:18
19.	"In-A-Gadda-Da-Vida" (Iron Butterfly cover)	Doug Ingle	3:37
20.	"You're the Voice" (John Farnham cover)	Chris Thompson, Maggie Ryder, Andy Qunta, Keith Reid	4:44

== Lineup ==
- Hansi Kürsch – vocals, bass
- André Olbrich – lead, rhythm and acoustic guitars
- Marcus Siepen – guitar
- Thomas "Thomen" Stauch – drums

== Guest musicians ==
- Mathias Wiesner – effects (tracks 1, 4, 11–13), bass (track 6)
- Michael Shüren – piano (track 2)
- Piet Sielck – backing vocals (track 2), effects (track 8)
- Otto Sidenius – organ (track 5)
- Jacob Moth – acoustic guitar (tracks 5, 11)
- Billy King – backing vocals (tracks 5–6)
- Thomas Hackmann – backing vocals (tracks 5, 10)
- Ronnie Atkins – backing vocals (track 5)
- Rolf Köhler – lead vocals (track 10), backing vocals (tracks 6, 10)
- Kalle Trapp – lead guitars (track 10), lead vocals (track 10), backing vocals (track 10)
- Aman Malek – backing vocals (track 10)
- Stefan Will – piano (track 6)

== Personnel ==
- Ralph Kessler – mastering
- Andreas Marschall – cover paintings
- Dirk Zumpe – photos
- Flemming Rasmussen – recording (tracks 1, 5, 7, 11), mixing and engineering (tracks 1, 5, 11), producing (tracks 1, 5)
- Piet Sielck – recording (tracks 2–4, 7–8, 12–13), mixing and producing (tracks 2–4, 7–9, 12–13), engineering (tracks 1–3, 6, 12)
- Kalle Trapp – recording, mixing, producing and engineering (tracks 6, 10)
- Henrik Vindeby – recording (tracks 4, 7, 8), engineering (tracks 2, 12), assistant engineering (tracks 1, 5, 11)
- Blind Guardian – producing (tracks 3–4, 7–9, 12–13)

== Charts ==
Chart (1996)	Peak position
German Albums (Offizielle Top 100)	36
Japanese Albums (Oricon)	41
