= And Then There Was Silence =

Single by Blind Guardian

from the album A Night at the Opera
- Released: 12 November 2001
- Recorded: Twilight Hall Studios (Grefrath, Germany)
- Genre: Power metal; progressive metal; symphonic metal
- Length: 14:06
- Label: Virgin
- Songwriter(s): Hansi Kürsch, André Olbrich
- Producer(s): Charlie Bauerfeind

Blind Guardian singles chronology
"Mirror Mirror" (1998)	"And Then There Was Silence" (2001)	"The Bard's Song (In the Forest)" (2003)

"And Then There Was Silence" is a song by German power metal band Blind Guardian. It was released in November 2001 as the lead single from their album A Night at the Opera.

Written by singer Hansi Kürsch and composed by Kürsch and guitarist André Olbrich, the song is based on The Iliad by Homer and on the Aeneid by Virgil, and narrates the final days of Troy, as foreseen by Cassandra, daughter of the king of the destroyed city who foresaw the event.

The song required as much production time as the rest of A Night at the Opera combined due to its length, intricacy, and number of audio tracks. At over 14 minutes, it is the longest track recorded by Blind Guardian. A new version was recorded in 2012 and included as part of the compilation album Memories of a Time to Come.

== Track listing ==
1. "And Then There Was Silence" – 14:06
2. "Harvest of Sorrow" – 3:40
3. "Born in a Mourning Hall" (multimedia track) – 5:17

== Personnel ==
- Hansi Kürsch – vocals and backing vocals
- André Olbrich – lead, rhythm and acoustic guitar
- Marcus Siepen – rhythm guitar
- Thomen Stauch – drums and percussion

=== Production ===
- Anry Nemo – cover art

== Charts ==
Chart (2001)	Peak position
Germany (GfK)	41
Spain (AFYVE)	1
Sweden (Sverigetopplistan)	41

=== Year-end charts ===
Chart (2001)	Position
Canada (Nielsen SoundScan)	143
