= Memories of a Time to Come =

Compilation album by Blind Guardian
- Released: 20 January 2012
- Genre: Power metal
- Length: 176:31
- Label: Nuclear Blast

Blind Guardian chronology
The Forgotten Tales (1996)	Memories of a Time to Come (2012)	A Traveler's Guide to Space and Time (2013)

Professional ratings
Review scores
Source	Rating
About.com	4/5 stars

Memories of a Time to Come is the second compilation album by German power metal band Blind Guardian. It was released on 20 January 2012. With the exception of "Sacred Worlds", all songs on the first two discs have been remixed, while "Valhalla", "The Bard's Song (In the Forest)", "The Bard's Song (The Hobbit)" and "And Then There Was Silence" have been re-recorded. The third disc, which is included only in deluxe limited edition, contains various demo recordings.

== Track listing ==
Disc 1
No.	Title	Length
1.	"Imaginations from the Other Side"	7:11
2.	"Nightfall"	5:34
3.	"Ride into Obsession"	4:46
4.	"Somewhere Far Beyond"	7:32
5.	"Majesty"	7:29
6.	"Traveler in Time"	6:01
7.	"Follow the Blind"	7:11
8.	"The Last Candle"	6:03

Disc 2
No.	Title	Length
1.	"Sacred Worlds"	9:17
2.	"This Will Never End"	5:07
3.	"Valhalla"	5:13
4.	"Bright Eyes"	5:15
5.	"Mirror Mirror"	5:09
6.	"The Bard's Song (In the Forest)"	3:26
7.	"The Bard's Song (The Hobbit)"	3:41
8.	"And Then There Was Silence"	14:06

Disc 3
No.	Title	Length
1.	"Brian"	2:41
2.	"Halloween (The Wizard's Crown)"	3:22
3.	"Lucifer’s Heritage"	4:36
4.	"Symphonies of Doom"	4:08
5.	"Dead of the Night"	3:33
6.	"Majesty"	7:31
7.	"Trial by the Archon"	1:45
8.	"Battalions of Fear"	6:09
9.	"Run for the Night"	3:36
10.	"Lost in the Twilight Hall"	6:02
11.	"Tommyknockers"	5:13
12.	"Ashes to Ashes"	6:00
13.	"Time What Is Time"	5:46
14.	"A Past and Future Secret"	3:48
15.	"The Script for My Requiem"	6:09

== Charts ==
Chart (2012)	Peak position
Austrian Albums (Ö3 Austria)	36
Finnish Albums (Suomen virallinen lista)	45
German Albums (Offizielle Top 100)	6
Italian Albums (FIMI)	93
Spanish Albums (PROMUSICAE)	54
Swedish Albums (Sverigetopplistan)	44
Swiss Albums (Schweizer Hitparade)	60
