= Tales from the Twilight World =

Studio album by Blind Guardian
- Released: 16 July 1990
- Recorded: March – May 1990 at Karo Studios
- Genres: Power metal; speed metal
- Length: 40:52
- Labels: No Remorse, Virgin, Century Media
- Producer: Kalle Trapp

Blind Guardian chronology
Follow the Blind (1989)	Tales from the Twilight World (1990)	Somewhere Far Beyond (1992)

Professional ratings
Review scores
Source	Rating
AllMusic	4.5/5 stars
Rock Hard	(9.5/10)

Tales from the Twilight World is the third studio album by the German power metal band Blind Guardian, released on 16 July 1990.

== Track listing ==
All lyrics are written by Hansi Kürsch, except for "To France".

No.	Title	Music	Length
1.	"Traveler in Time"	Hansi Kürsch and André Olbrich	6:02
2.	"Welcome to Dying"	Kürsch, Olbrich	4:50
3.	"Weird Dreams" (instrumental)	Olbrich	1:22
4.	"Lord of the Rings"	Kürsch, Marcus Siepen	3:18
5.	"Goodbye My Friend"	Kürsch, Olbrich, Thomas "Thomen" Stauch	5:36
6.	"Lost in the Twilight Hall"	Kürsch, Olbrich, Siepen, Stauch	6:02
7.	"Tommyknockers"	Kürsch, Olbrich	5:13
8.	"Altair 4"	Kürsch, Olbrich	2:27
9.	"The Last Candle"	Kürsch, Olbrich	6:02

Japanese LP and CD bonus track^{[a]}
No.	Title	Music	Length
10.	"Run for the Night" (Live)	Kürsch, Olbrich, Siepen, Stauch	3:42

2003 re-release bonus tracks
No.	Title	Writer(s)	Length
11.	"Lords of the Rings" (Demo)	Kürsch, Siepen	3:57
12.	"To France" (Mike Oldfield cover)	Mike Oldfield	4:39

2007 re-release bonus tracks
No.	Title	Music	Length
11.	"Lost in the Twilight Hall" (Demo)	Kürsch, Olbrich, Siepen, Stauch	5:58
12.	"Tommyknockers" (Demo)	Kürsch, Olbrich	5:09

a. Recorded live in Braunschweig in 1989.

== Lyrical references ==
- "Traveler in Time" is based on Frank Herbert's Dune
- "Welcome to Dying" is based on Peter Straub's Floating Dragon
- "Lord of the Rings" is based on J. R. R. Tolkien's The Lord of the Rings
- "Tommyknockers" and "Altair 4" are based on Stephen King's The Tommyknockers
- "Goodbye My Friend" is inspired by the film E.T.
- "Lost in the Twilight Hall" is about the time spent "between worlds" by the wizard Gandalf the Grey after defeating the Balrog of Moria before his reincarnation as Gandalf the White.
- "The Last Candle" talks about places and events of Margaret Weis and Tracy Hickman's Dragonlance universe, specially from the "Chronicles" and "Legends" trilogies.

== Personnel ==
Blind Guardian

- Hansi Kürsch – vocals, bass
- André Olbrich – lead guitar, backing vocals
- Marcus Siepen – rhythm guitar, backing vocals
- Thomas "Thomen" Stauch – drums

Guest appearances

- Kai Hansen – backing vocals, vocals on "Lost in the Twilight Hall", guitar solo on "The Last Candle"
- Piet Sielck – backing vocals, effects
- Mathias Wiesner – effects, keyboards
- Rolf Köhler, "Hacky" Hackmann and Kalle Trapp – backing vocals

Production

- Kalle Trapp – production, mixing, recording
- Piet Sielck – second engineer
- Charley Rinne – executive producer
- Andreas Marshall – cover paintings and idea
- Buffo/Charley Rinne – pictures

== Charts ==
Chart (1990)	Peak position
Japanese Albums (Oricon)	40

Chart (2018)	Peak position
German Albums (Offizielle Top 100)	43
