= Imaginations from the Other Side =

Studio album by Blind Guardian
- Released: 4 April 1995
- Recorded: August 1994 – March 1995
- Studios: Sweet Silence Studios, Copenhagen, Denmark
- Genre: Power metal,speed metal, progressive metal
- Length: 49:18
- Labels: Virgin, Century Media
- Producer: Flemming Rasmussen

Blind Guardian chronology
Somewhere Far Beyond (1992)	Imaginations from the Other Side (1995)	Nightfall in Middle-Earth (1998)

Singles from Imaginations from the Other Side
- 1. "A Past and Future Secret" Released: 6 February 1995; 2. "Bright Eyes" Released: 21 June 1995

Imaginations from the Other Side is the fifth studio album by the German power metal band Blind Guardian, released in 1995. The atmosphere of this album is darker in comparison to their earlier works, such as Battalions of Fear, which had a relatively light tone. This album also marks the first since Battalions of Fear which Kai Hansen (Helloween, Gamma Ray) did not contribute guest vocals or guitar, and the last album to feature vocalist Hansi Kürsch as bassist. It was also their first album to spawn singles, namely "A Past and Future Secret" and "Bright Eyes". It was remastered and re-released on 15 June 2007, with bonus tracks and videos.

== Background and recording ==
Having experienced much success from their previous releases, Somewhere Far Beyond and Tokyo Tales (their first live album), the band was optimistic as they began writing for a new album once again. They soon noted how slow the process was advancing in comparison to previous writing sessions. For these new songs, personal standards were raised for which parts should make the cut, and ideas that weren't satisfactory were therefore scrapped. However, after the first two songs, "Imaginations from the Other Side" and "The Script for my Requiem", were demoed, the bandmembers were pleased by their exceptional quality, and once the next two songs, "I'm Alive" and "A Past and Future Secret", were written and added to the demo tape, they were confident in moving forward. Having not been satisfied with the production on their last two releases, Somewhere Far Beyond and Tokyo Tales (both produced by Kalle Trapp), Kürsch and Olbrich soon began searching for a new producer whilst traveling around Europe.

At their first stop, Denmark, they met producer Flemming Rasmussen, who had previously worked with bands Rainbow, Pretty Maids, and Metallica (a predominant influence on the band's style). After visiting other studios throughout the summer, even ones in which albums of the Beatles and the Rolling Stones were recorded, the two felt that Rasmussen, who had been noticeably impressed by the demo tape, was the obvious choice. Despite him expecting more out of the band than they were previously accustomed to with Trapp (specifically in rhythm guitar and vocal performances), there was a noticeable chemistry between Rasmussen and the band. Rhythm guitarist Marcus Siepen would later reflect that he "took [them] to a completely different level, in any aspect."

== Musical style and lyrics ==
Following the footsteps of the band's previous albums, Imaginations continued to stray from purely speed metal tendencies. In addition to fast guitar riffing, high-pitch distorted singing and extreme drumming (signature of speed metal) came catchy chord progressions and clean singing - components reminiscent of classic European folk music. Two tracks, "A Past and Future Secret" and "Mordred's Song" (comparable to their previous album's "The Bard's Song (In the Forest)" by similar use of acoustic guitar), could even be considered to be a "ballad" and "power ballad", respectively.

"Bright Eyes", according to an interview with Hansi, is his own story, unlike many of the band's other songs that are based on popular fantasy works. "And the Story Ends" continues the story, which would continue further on the band's tenth studio album, Beyond the Red Mirror.

== Critical reception ==
Professional ratings
Review scores
Source	Rating
AllMusic	4/5 stars
Rock Hard	9.5/10

In 2005, Imaginations from the Other Side was ranked number 373 in Rock Hard magazine's book The 500 Greatest Rock & Metal Albums of All Time.

Loudwire named the album at second in their list "Top 25 Power Metal Albums of All Time" and Metal Hammer ranked it at third in a similar list.

== Track listing ==
All songs written by Hansi Kürsch and André Olbrich, except for where noted.

No.	Title	Length
1.	"Imaginations from the Other Side"	7:19
2.	"I'm Alive"	5:31
3.	"A Past and Future Secret"	3:48
4.	"The Script for My Requiem"	6:09
5.	"Mordred's Song"	5:29
6.	"Born in a Mourning Hall"	5:14
7.	"Bright Eyes"	5:16
8.	"Another Holy War"	4:32
9.	"And the Story Ends"	6:00

Japanese edition bonus tracks
No.	Title	Length
10.	"The Wizard" (Uriah Heep cover)	3:17

Japanese limited edition bonus tracks
No.	Title	Length
10.	"The Wizard" (Uriah Heep cover)	3:17
11.	"I'm Alive" (Demo version)	5:20
12.	"Imaginations from the Other Side" (Demo version)	7:03
13.	"A Past and Future Secret" (Demo version)	3:38
14.	"The Script for My Requiem" (Demo version)	7:01

2007 re-release bonus tracks
No.	Title	Length
10.	"A Past and Future Secret" (Demo version)	3:38
11.	"Imaginations from the Other Side" (Demo version)	7:03
12.	"The Script for My Requiem" (Demo version)	7:01
13.	"Bright Eyes" (Video)
14.	"Born in a Mourning Hall" (Video)

2018 re-release bonus tracks
No.	Title	Length
10.	"The Wizard"	3:21
11.	"System's Failing"	4:24

== Personnel ==
- Hansi Kürsch – vocals and bass
- André Olbrich – lead, rhythm and acoustic guitars
- Marcus Siepen – rhythm guitar
- Thomen Stauch – drums and percussion

Guest musicians

- Mathias Wiesner – effects
- Jacob Moth – acoustic guitar on "A Past and Future Secret"
- Billy King, "Hacky" Hackmann, Rolf Köhler, Piet Sielck, Ronnie Atkins – backing vocals

Production

- Andreas Marschall – cover paintings
- Ulf Thürmann – photos
- Flemming Rasmussen – producing and mixing
- Flemming Rasmussen and Piet Sielck – engineering
- Henrik Vindeby – assistant engineer
- Flemming Rasmussen and Cuni – drum tech

== Charts ==
Chart (1995)	Peak position
German Albums (Offizielle Top 100)	13
Japanese Albums (Oricon)	11
Swiss Albums (Schweizer Hitparade)	33
