= Tokyo Tales =

Live album by Blind Guardian
- Released: 22 March 1993
- Recorded: 4 December 1992 at Koseinenkin Hall, Tokyo, Japan; 6 December 1992 at NHK Hall, Tokyo, Japan
- Genre: Speed metal, power metal
- Length: 68:04
- Label: Virgin Records
- Producer: Kalle Trapp

Blind Guardian live chronology
Tokyo Tales (1993)	Live (2003)

Professional ratings
Review scores
Source	Rating
AllMusic	link
Sputnikmusic	4.0/5 stars

Tokyo Tales is the first live album by German power metal band Blind Guardian. It was remastered and re-released on 15 June 2007, with the same Japanese bonus track.

== Track listing ==
1. "Inquisition" – 0:47
2. "Banish from Sanctuary" – 6:03
3. "Journey Through the Dark" – 5:12
4. "Traveler in Time" – 6:32
5. "The Quest for Tanelorn" – 6:03
6. "Goodbye My Friend" – 6:28
7. "Time What is Time" – 6:42
8. "Majesty" – 7:48
9. "Valhalla" – 6:08
10. "Welcome to Dying" – 5:56
11. "Lord of the Rings" (Japanese/2007 re-release bonus track) – 3:52
12. "Lost in the Twilight Hall" – 7:26
13. "Barbara Ann" – 2:56

== Personnel ==
=== Blind Guardian ===
- Hansi Kürsch – vocals and bass
- André Olbrich – lead guitar and backing vocals
- Marcus Siepen – rhythm guitar and backing vocals
- Thomas "Thomen" Stauch – drums

=== Guest musicians ===
- Marc Zee – keyboards and backing vocals

=== Crew ===
- Thomas "Länglich" Nisch - stage manager
- Sascha Wischnewsky - merchandising
- Dirkie Busche - guitars
- Daniel Kleckers - drums
- Kalle Trapp - production, sound
- Henry Klaere - tour manager
- Jogi Cappel - lighting
- Buffo Schnädelbach - photos
- Piet Sielck - second engineer

== Charts ==
Chart (1993)	Peak position
Japanese Albums (Oricon)	59

== Certifications ==
Region	Certification	Certified units/sales
Belgium (BRMA)	Gold	25,000^{*}
^{*} Sales figures based on certification alone.
