= The Bard's Song (In the Forest) =

Single by Blind Guardian

from the album Somewhere Far Beyond
- Released: 5 May 2003
- Recorded: February–March 2003
- Studio: Twilight Hall Studios
- Genre: Folk Rock
- Length: 21:19
- Label: Virgin
- Songwriter(s): Hansi Kürsch, André Olbrich
- Producer(s): Charlie Bauerfeind

Blind Guardian singles chronology
"And Then There Was Silence" (2001)	"The Bard's Song (In the Forest)" (2003)	"Fly" (2006)

"The Bard's Song (In the Forest)" is a single by German power metal band Blind Guardian, released in 2003. It contains five different versions of this track, one of their most popular songs, which originally appeared on the album Somewhere Far Beyond. The song is a folk rock ballad, in contrast to the band's usual power metal sound.

The single's cover art was painted by Leo Hao.

At concerts, it is not unusual for Hansi Kürsch to only sing the first and third lines of the song, then possibly the final verse or chorus, and leave the audience to sing the rest.

The song has been covered by German a cappella metal band van Canto on their album Hero.

== Track listing ==
1. "The Bard's Song (In the Forest)" (New Studio Version) – 3:30
2. "The Bard's Song (In the Forest)" (Live, Milano, October 10, 2002) – 4:32
3. "The Bard's Song (In the Forest)" (Live, Munich, May 5, 2002) – 4:29
4. "The Bard's Song (In the Forest)" (Live, Madrid, June 4, 2002) – 4:30
5. "The Bard's Song (In the Forest)" (multimedia track: Live, Stuttgart, May 6, 2002) – 4:18

== Charts ==
#40 Germany

#31 Italy

== Personnel ==
- Hansi Kürsch – vocals and strings arrangement
- André Olbrich – acoustic lead guitar and backing vocals
- Marcus Siepen – acoustic rhythm guitar and backing vocals
