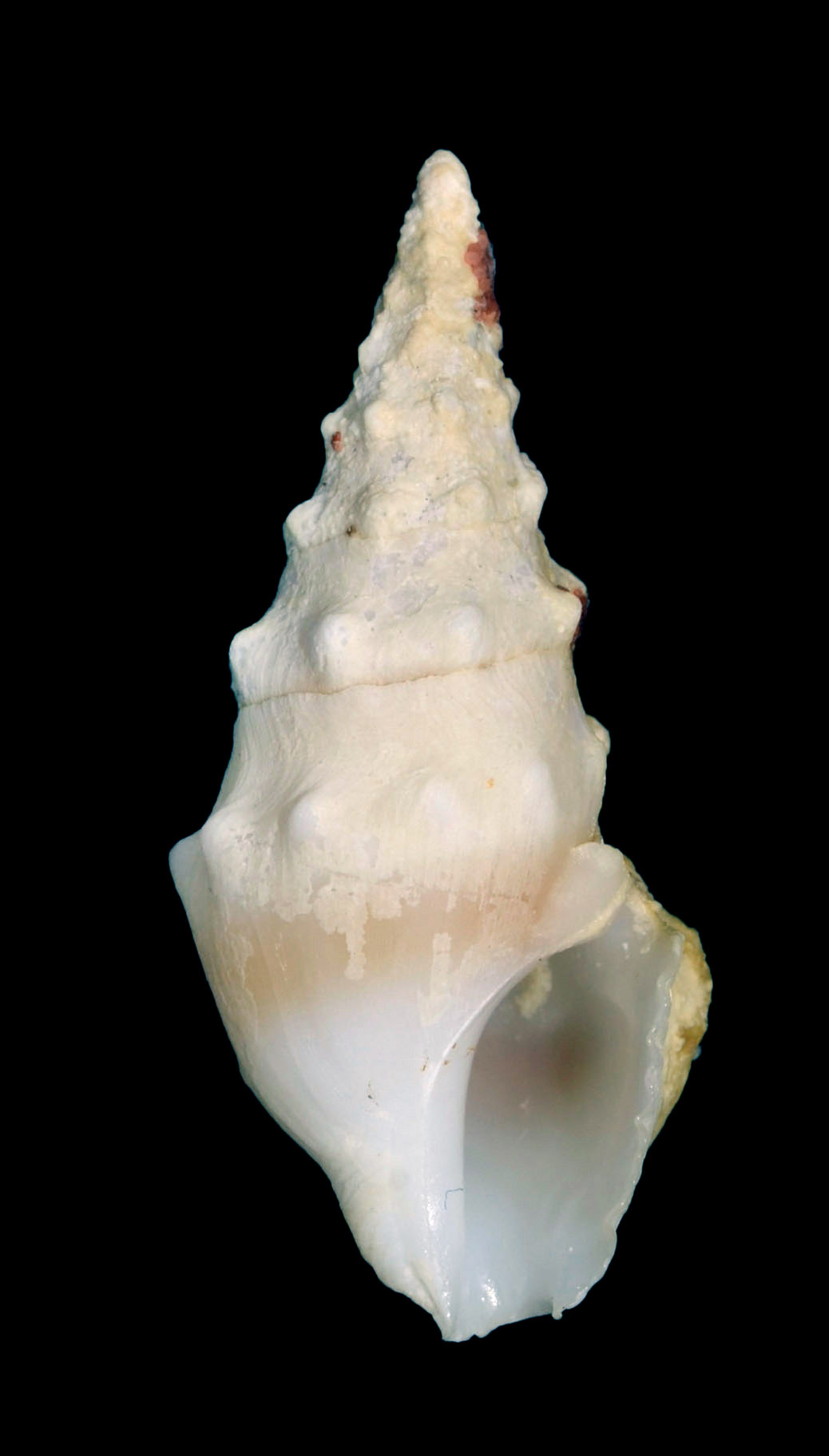
- Shell of Clavus andreolbrichi (holotype at MNHN, Paris)

Scientific classification
- Kingdom: Animalia
- Phylum: Mollusca
- Class: Gastropoda
- Subclass: Caenogastropoda
- Order: Neogastropoda
- Superfamily: Conoidea
- Family: Drilliidae
- Genus: Clavus
- Species: C. andreolbrichi

Binomial name
- Clavus andreolbrichi Fedosov & Puillandre, 2020

= Clavus andreolbrichi =

Species of gastropod

Clavus andreolbrichi is a species of sea snail, a marine gastropod mollusk in the family Drilliidae. It was named for German power metal guitarist, Andre Olbrich.

== Description ==
The length of the shell attains 26 mm.

== Distribution ==
This marine species is endemic to Papua New Guinea.
