= Sinbreed =

German power metal band

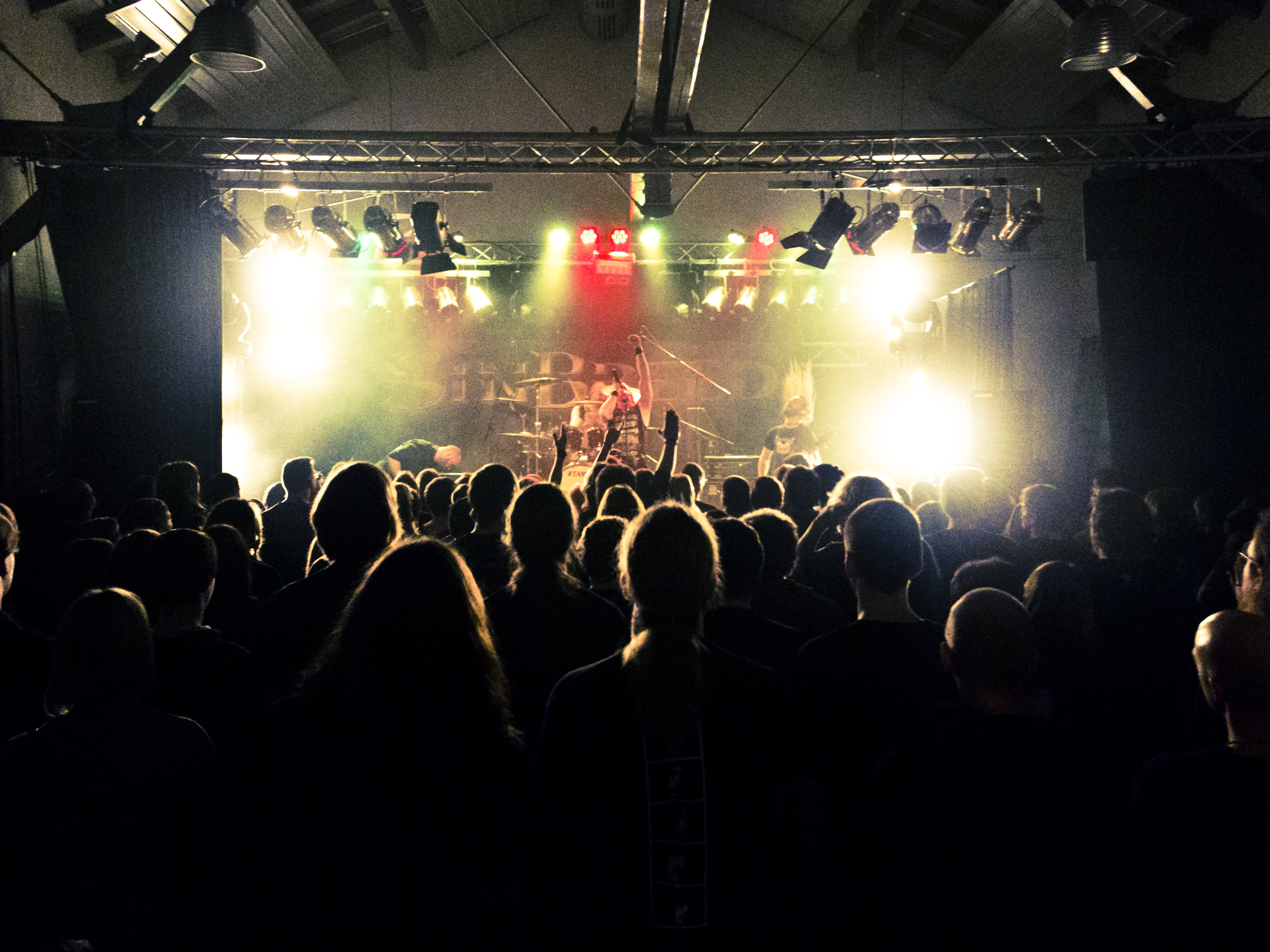
- Sinbreed in 2012

Background information
- Origin: Wiesbaden, Germany
- Genres: Power metal, Christian metal
- Years active: 2005–present
- Labels: Ulterium, AFM, Massacre
- Spinoff of: Blind Guardian
- Members: Herbie Langhans; Frederik Ehmke; Alexander Schulz; Flo Laurin
- Past members: Marcus Siepen; Martin Brendler
- Website: sinbreed.com

Sinbreed is a German Christian metal band who play power metal, formed in 2005 in Wiesbaden.

== Biography ==
Sinbreed was founded as Neoshine, and made it to release three demos under that name, but was forced to change to Sinbreed in order to avoid legal issues with an homonymous American company.

Their debut album When Worlds Collide was released in March 2010 and featured keyboardists Morten Sandager (Pretty Maids, Mercenary) and Joost van den Broek (After Forever), guitarists Oliver Lohmann and Andreas Iancu, and singer Thomas Rettke (Redkey, ex-Heaven's Gate).

In November 2012, Blind Guardian guitarist Marcus Siepen, who was already a session member of the band, joined them as a full-time member.

The band's second full-length album, Shadows, was set to be released by the end of 2013, but the date was postponed to sometime March 2014 after they signed with AFM Records.

By the end of November 2015, Sinbreed announced that Siepen would leave the band due to conflicting schedules with Blind Guardian. They also announced they would be releasing a new album in early 2016.

In early 2018, Herbie Langhans left the group and was later replaced by Nick Holleman. With him and new guitarist Manuel Seoane (Mägo de Oz), they released their fourth studio album IV on 23 November via Massacre Records. The album received mixed reviews by critics.

== Members ==
- Nick Holleman – vocals (2018–present)
- Flo Laurin – lead guitar, keyboards (2005–present)
- Alexander Schulz – bass (2005–present)
- Frederik Ehmke – drums (2005–present)
- Manuel Seoane – rhythm guitar (2018–present)

=== Former members ===
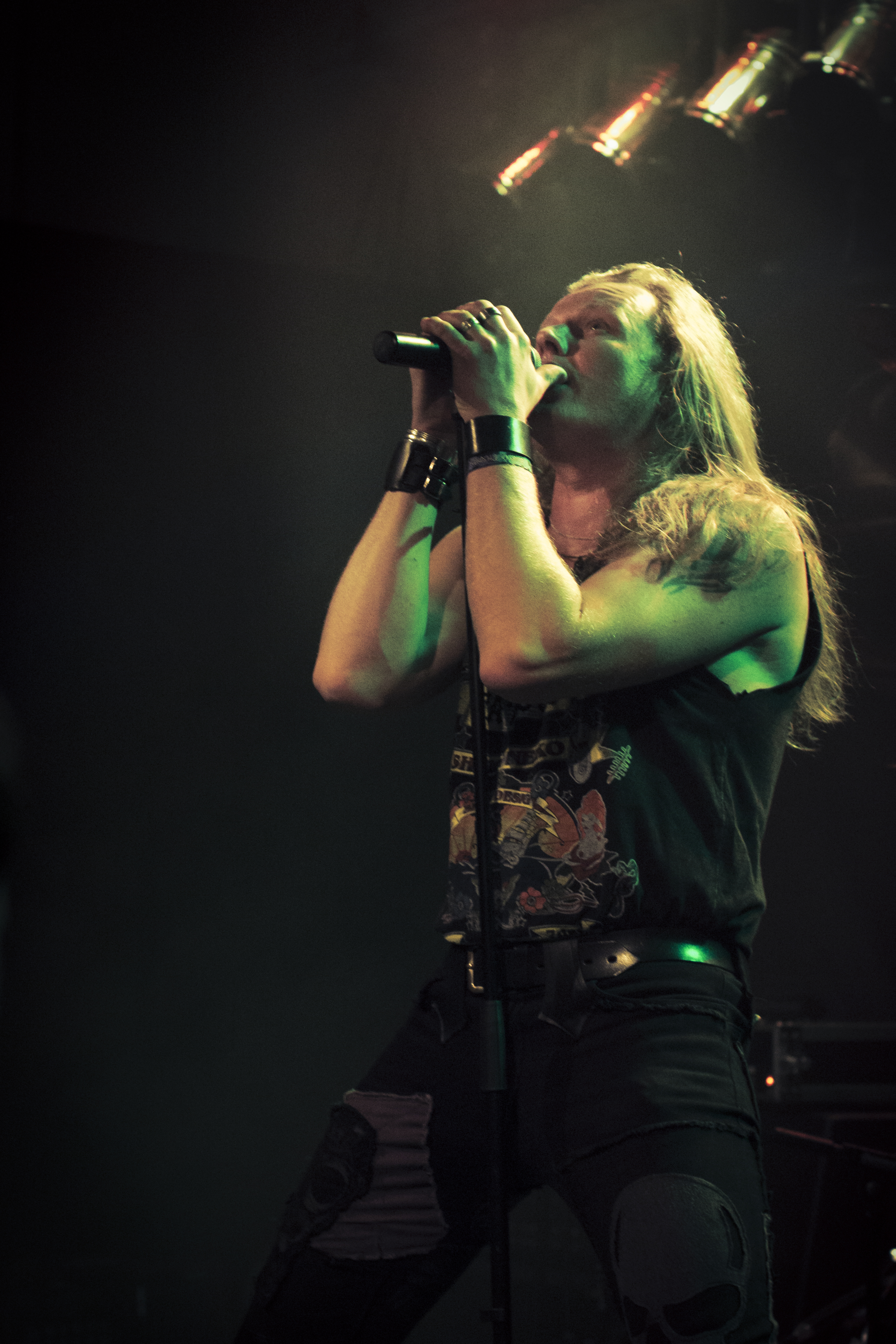
Former vocalist Herbie Langhans, 2012

- Herbie Langhans – vocals (2005–2017)
- Marcus Siepen – rhythm guitar (2012–2015)
- Martin Brendler – vocals (2005)

== Discography ==
- When Worlds Collide (2010)
- Shadows (2014)
- Master Creator (2016)
- IV (2018)
