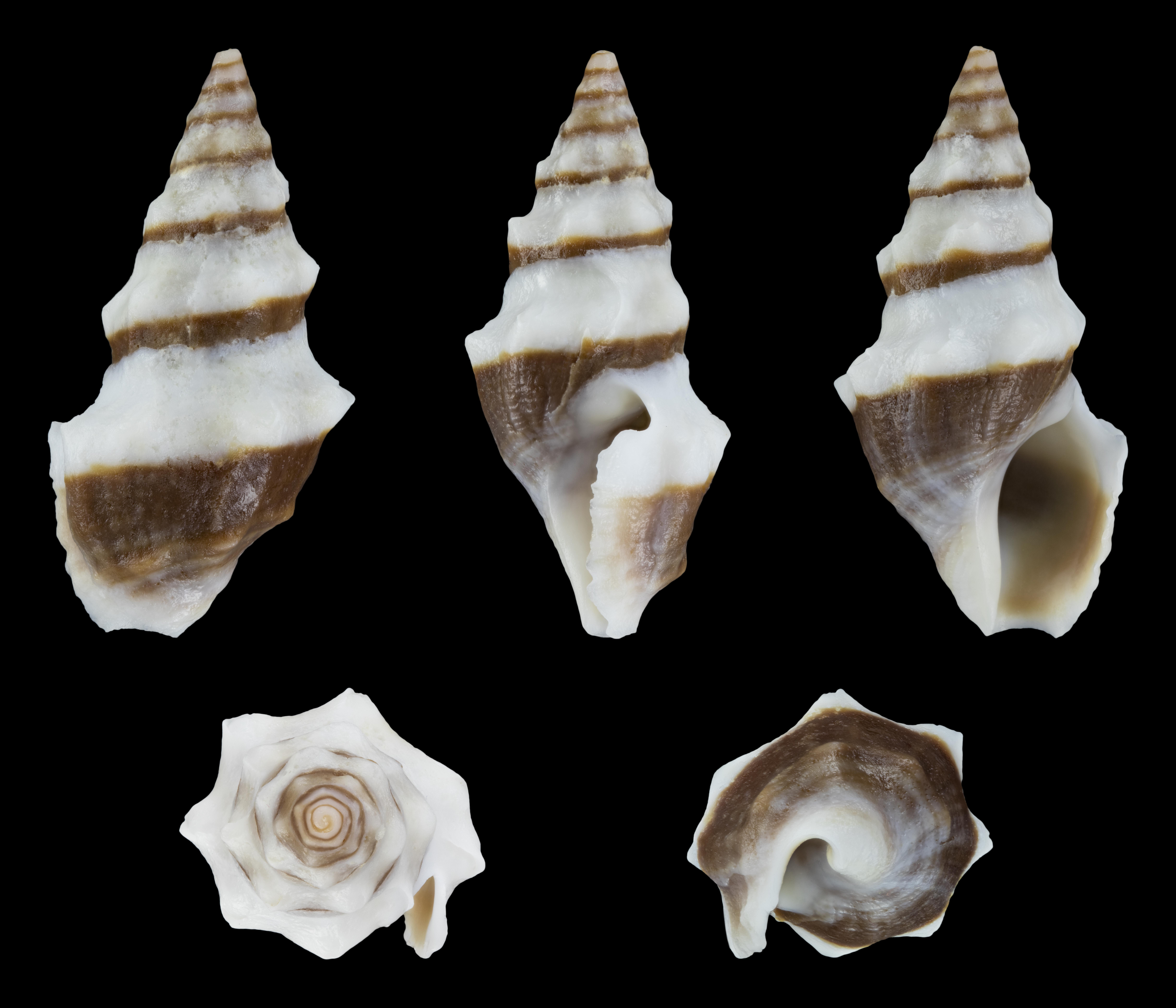
- A shells Clavus canalicularis

Scientific classification
- Kingdom: Animalia
- Phylum: Mollusca
- Class: Gastropoda
- Subclass: Caenogastropoda
- Order: Neogastropoda
- Superfamily: Conoidea
- Family: Drilliidae
- Genus: Clavus
- Species: C. canalicularis

Binomial name
- Clavus canalicularis (Röding, 1798)

Synonyms
- Clavus auriculifera Lamarck, J.B.P.A. de, 1816; Drillia cf. auriculifera Lamarck, 1816; Strombus canalicularis Röding, 1798 (basionym)

= Clavus canalicularis =

Species of gastropod

Clavus canalicularis, common name the ear turrid, is a species of sea snail, a marine gastropod mollusk in the family Drilliidae.

== Description ==
The shell grows to a length of 27 mm.

The white shell shows a broad chestnut band below the periphery. The tuberculations of the periphery are often long and spinose. Usually a revolving row of nodules appears below the middle of the body whorl.

== Distribution ==
This marine species occurs in the Red Sea and in the Indo-West Pacific off Vietnam, Indonesia, Papua New Guinea and the Philippines; off Australia (Northern Territory, Queensland).
