= Flemming Rasmussen =

Danish record producer

- Born: 1 January 1958 (age 68); Copenhagen, Denmark
- Genres: Heavy metal
- Occupations: Record producer, sound engineer

Flemming Rasmussen (born 1 January 1958) is a Danish sound engineer, record producer, and owner and founder of Sweet Silence Studios in Copenhagen. He is the chief sound engineer at Sweet Silence Studios.

== Biography ==
Throughout his career, Rasmussen has worked with many different music genres, but is best known for his work with heavy metal.

Rasmussen began his career as an assistant at the Rosenberg Studios facility run by producer/engineer Freddy Hansson. In 1976, Hansson founded the Sweet Silence Studios and brought Rasmussen with him. In 1980, Rasmussen became co-owner of the studio, and one year later became an engineer, recording the 1981 album Difficult to Cure by Rainbow. This subsequently attracted Metallica, who brought in Rasmussen to work on their album Ride the Lightning (1984). The partnership continued through to the proceeding two studio albums, Master of Puppets (1986) and ...And Justice for All (1988).

He also produced the Morbid Angel album Covenant, Blind Guardian's albums Imaginations from the Other Side, The Forgotten Tales and Nightfall in Middle-Earth, Artillery's By Inheritance and Ensiferum's Iron, amongst others. In 1999 he took over Sweet Silence, which was demolished in 2009 to make way for an apartment complex and a car park. Rasmussen then moved to Winding Road Studios in Copenhagen. He then left in January 2014 to reopen Sweet Silence in Helsingør north of Copenhagen, under the name of Sweet Silence North.

Rasmussen won a Grammy for producing Metallica's "One" in 1989. In 1994, the Danish Grammys recognized him as producer of the year for his work on Sort Sol's Glamourpuss. Flemming also worked with Evile on their debut Enter the Grave in 2007. and Monte Pittman "The Power of Three" in 2014.

== Discography ==
=== As producer ===
- Rainbow - Difficult to Cure (1981)
- Metallica - Ride the Lightning (1984)
- Metallica - Master of Puppets (1986)
- Metallica - ...And Justice for All (1988)
- Artillery - By Inheritance (1990)
- Pretty Maids - Sin-Decade (1992) (co-producer)
- Sort Sol - Glamourpuss (1993)
- Morbid Angel - Covenant (1993)
- Pretty Maids - Scream (1994) (co-producer)
- Blind Guardian - Imaginations From the Other Side (1995)
- Blind Guardian - The Forgotten Tales (1996)
- Blind Guardian - Nightfall In Middle-Earth (1998)
- Ensiferum - Iron (2004)
- Evile - Enter the Grave (2007)
- Monte Pittman - The Power of Three (2014)

=== As engineer ===
- Rainbow - Bent Out of Shape (1983)
- Mew - Half the World Is Watching Me (2000)
