= No Remorse Records =

German record label

No Remorse Records was a German heavy metal record label. It was the original record label of heavy metal band Blind Guardian.

== Discography ==
- NRR 1001: Blind Guardian - Battalions of Fear
- NRR 1002: Dimple Minds - Blau auf'm Bau
- NRR 1003: Grinder - Dawn for the Living
- NRR 1004: Dimple Minds - Trinker an die Macht
- NRR 1005: Heavens Gate - In Control
- NRR 1006: Blind Guardian - Follow the Blind
- NRR 1007: Grinder - Dead End
- NRR 1008: Lawdy - Outlaw Invasion
- NRR 1009: Sacrosanct - Truth Is What Is
- NRR 1010: Pyracanda - Two Sides of a Coin
- NRR 1011: Grinder - The First EP
- NRR 1012: Heavens Gate - Open the Gate and Watch
- NRR 1013: Wardance - Heaven Is for Sale
- NRR 1014: Blind Guardian - Tales from the Twilight World
- NRR 1015: Centaur - Mob Rules the World

== See also ==
- List of record labels
