= Nightfall in Middle-Earth =

- Cover art by Andreas Marschall of Lúthien dancing before Morgoth, from The Tale of Beren and Lúthien

Studio album by Blind Guardian
- Released: 28 April 1998
- Recorded: July 1997 – January 1998
- Studio: Twilight Hall Studios; Karo Studios; Sweet Silence Studios; Vox Studios; Air-Edel Studios
- Genre: Power metal; progressive metal; speed metal; symphonic metal
- Length: 65:29
- Label: Virgin/Century Media
- Producer: Flemming Rasmussen, Blind Guardian

Blind Guardian chronology
Imaginations from the Other Side (1995)	Nightfall in Middle-Earth (1998)	A Night at the Opera (2002)

Singles from Nightfall in Middle-Earth
- 1. "Mirror Mirror" Released: 7 February 1998

Nightfall in Middle-Earth is the sixth studio album by the German power metal band Blind Guardian. It was released on 28 April 1998 through Virgin Records. It is a concept album based on J. R. R. Tolkien's The Silmarillion, a book of tales from the First Age of Middle-earth, recounting the troubled history of Beleriand as the Elves battle with the Dark Lord Morgoth. The album contains not only songs but also spoken parts narrating parts of the story. The cover depicts a scene from The Silmarillion, the elf Lúthien dancing in front of the Dark Lord Morgoth.

Nightfall in Middle-Earth is widely regarded as one of Blind Guardian's best-known and best-received albums in their discography. It is also the first album with Oliver Holzwarth as guest musician, playing bass guitar instead of Hansi Kürsch.

It was the first album by Blind Guardian to be released in the United States. The sales encouraged Century Media to release their entire back catalog in the US in 2007, at which point it was remastered and re-released, with a bonus track.

== Musical style ==
The album has been described as "grandiose" and influenced by progressive rock. It has been compared to Queen's operatic approach with "dense choir-like vocal harmonies set against swirling multi-part guitar lines." Music critics have noted the fast, melodic guitar-work and the use of folk instruments, flutes, violins, and other instruments. The album's songs are varied, with "quick-paced numbers", ballads, and operatic pieces. Metal Hammer described it as "a banquet of medieval/folk, speed/power metal, and Queen-esque vocal twists, complete with interludes to illustrate the plot."

== Thematic references ==
The album retells the events in The Silmarillion, beginning with an episode at the end:

1. In "War of Wrath", Sauron advises his master Morgoth to flee the triumphant Valar in the War of Wrath. Morgoth sends him away and reflects on the events leading up to his defeat.
2. In "Into the Storm", Morgoth and Ungoliant, fleeing from Valinor after having destroyed the Two Trees, struggle for the possession of the Silmarils.
3. "Lammoth" is Morgoth's scream of fear. It summons his Balrogs to his aid to fight off Ungoliant.
4. In "Nightfall", Fëanor and his seven sons mourn the destruction wrought by Morgoth, including the slaying of Finwë, Fëanor's father, and swear to get revenge on him, in spite of the Valar's disapproval.
5. "The Minstrel" is most likely about Maglor, son of Fëanor, who composed the song "The Fall of the Noldor" based on the Kinslaying.
6. In "The Curse of Fëanor", Fëanor expresses his wrath and anger and relates the misdeeds he commits, especially the Kinslaying, in pursuit of Morgoth.
7. In "Captured", Morgoth addresses the captive Maedhros, Fëanor's son, and chains him to the Thangorodrim mountains.
8. In "Blood Tears", Maedhros relates the horrors of his captivity and his deliverance by Fingon.
9. "Mirror Mirror" recounts how Turgon, in view of inevitable defeat, builds the city of Gondolin, aided by Ulmo ("The Lord of Water").
10. In "Face the Truth", Fingolfin reflects about the destiny of the Noldor.
11. In "Noldor (Dead Winter Reigns)", Fingolfin recounts his Noldor army's passage from the icy waste of Helcaraxë and the prophecy by Mandos about the Noldor's fate; he reflects on his own and his people's guilt and foreshadows their ultimate defeat.
12. "The Battle of Sudden Flame" refers to the battle in which Morgoth breaks the Siege of Angband using his Balrogs and dragons. The lyrics tell of how Barahir of the House of Bëor, with great loss to his own company, saved the life of the Elven king Finrod Felagund, and in return Finrod swore an oath of friendship to Barahir and all of his kin.
13. "Time Stands Still (at the Iron Hill)" is about Fingolfin riding to the gates of Angband to challenge Morgoth to a duel. Fingolfin wounds Morgoth seven times but is eventually killed.
14. "The Dark Elf" refers to Eöl who seduced Turgon's sister and fathered Maeglin, who would eventually betray Gondolin.
15. "Thorn" is a song describing Maeglin's captivity in Angband and Morgoth trying to convert Maeglin to his side with threats and lies. The title of the song refers to the thorn bushes that hid the outer gates of Gondolin.
16. "The Eldar" is Elven king Finrod Felagund's farewell to his people, dying from wounds sustained by saving his human friend Beren from a werewolf, thereby fulfilling his oath to the House of Bëor.
17. In "Nom the Wise", Beren mourns his friend Finrod. Nóm means "wise" and was the name given to Finrod by Beren's forefather Bëor.
18. In "When Sorrow Sang", Beren sings about his love to the Elven princess Lúthien and his death at the teeth of Morgoth's wolf Carcharoth. Last part is about Mandos listening to Luthien's song about their grief experienced by being different in kin.
19. "Out on the Water" refers to the last dwelling-place of Beren and Lúthien.
20. In "The Steadfast", Morgoth curses his captive Húrin (known in Elvish as the Steadfast) who refused to reveal the secret of Gondolin.
21. In "A Dark Passage", Morgoth ponders his triumph in the fifth battle. The song also relates the origins of the kindred of men and Morgoth's curse on Húrin to be witness to his children's tragic fate.
22. "Final Chapter (Thus Ends ...)" concludes the album, speaking of Morgoth's victory by the "treachery of man" but also of the hope for a new day.
23. "Harvest of Sorrow" is a bonus track on the 2007 and 2018 remastered versions of the album. Túrin mourns the loss of his sister Niënor.
24. "Doom" is a bonus track on the 2018 remastered version of the album. The track shows a more detailed account of Húrin being cursed by Morgoth. A slightly rewritten version appears on a limited edition of Beyond the Red Mirror as an epilogue chapter.
25. "The Tides of War" is a bonus track on the 2018 remastered version of the album. The track tells of the rebellious Noldor arriving in Beleriand to face Morgoth, thinking also about the burning of the Teleri ships at Losgar and the Oath of Fëanor.

The cover art for the album features Lúthien dancing before Morgoth, from The Tale of Beren and Lúthien.

== Reception ==
Professional ratings
Review scores
Source	Rating
AllMusic	4/5 stars
Sputnikmusic	4.5/5
Metal Storm	7.7/10

The album has drawn universally positive critical acclaim since its release. Writing for Sputnikmusic, Kyle Ward said that on this album "Blind Guardian laid down their finest instrumental performance to date. Everything goes hand in hand with each other, the guitars being nearly always furiously paced and extremely melodic, but not over-the-top and cheesy like many other power metal bands out there." He singled out Hansi Kürsch's vocals for particular praise, writing that "In every aspect and mood, Blind Guardian delivers in the vocal department. Whether the song is amazingly fast and melodic, like "Time Stands Still (at the Iron Hill)" or whether the mood is somber and slow ("The Eldar") you are sure to be hit in the face with a simply remarkable feat in terms of vocal achievement, one of the finest vocal performances I have ever seen on a metal album."

AllMusic's Vincent Jeffries gave a similarly glowing assessment of the album, describing the album as "complete with anthemic choruses, spoken word story lines, and plenty of bombastic power metal punctuating every dramatic turn" and "perhaps Blind Guardian's most triumphant effort."

In a volume edited by Tolkien scholar Bradford Lee Eden, Amy H. Sturgis writes that "although one can assume that Tolkien was not a headbanger", she finds that in the opinion of her students, the "driving energy" of the power metal sound is appropriate for the stories: "The music conveys rage and despair, which fits lyrics such as 'The doom of the Noldor drew near/ The words of a banished king, “I swear revenge!”'" Sturgis adds that this facilitates discussion of Tolkien's Christian view of the fall of man.

Metal Hammer named it in its lists "The 10 Essential Symphonic Metal Albums" and in "The 10 Essential Power Metal Albums". ThoughtCo named it one of the essential power metal albums.

Grimdark Magazine's C.T. Phipps called it one of his "favorite power metal band's greatest works". He states that it is told from the point of view of the Dark Lord Morgoth, with the story told both in the songs and in "little vignettes" in between. He describes the music as "not just your traditional power metal sound but there's quite a bit of melodious, folksy Medieval sounding tunes spread between the fast guitar work."

== Track listing ==
The tracks are:

All lyrics are written by Hansi Kürsch; all music is composed by André Olbrich and Hansi Kürsch except where noted.

No.	Title	Length
1.	"War of Wrath"	1:50
2.	"Into the Storm"	4:24
3.	"Lammoth"	0:28
4.	"Nightfall"	5:34
5.	"The Minstrel"	0:32
6.	"The Curse of Fëanor" (Olbrich, Kürsch, Thomas "Thomen" Stauch and Marcus Siepen)	5:41
7.	"Captured"	0:26
8.	"Blood Tears"	5:24
9.	"Mirror Mirror"	5:06
10.	"Face the Truth"	0:24
11.	"Noldor (Dead Winter Reigns)"	6:51
12.	"Battle of Sudden Flame"	0:44
13.	"Time Stands Still (At the Iron Hill)"	4:53
14.	"The Dark Elf"	0:23
15.	"Thorn"	6:19
16.	"The Eldar" (Olbrich, Kürsch, Michael Schüren)	3:39
17.	"Nom the Wise"	0:33
18.	"When Sorrow Sang"	4:25
19.	"Out on the Water"	0:44
20.	"The Steadfast"	0:21
21.	"A Dark Passage"	6:01
22.	"Final Chapter (Thus Ends...)"	0:48

Japanese edition bonus tracks
No.	Title	Length
23.	"Nightfall" (orchestral version)	5:38
24.	"A Dark Passage" (instrumental version)	6:06

2007 re-release bonus track
No.	Title	Length
23.	"Harvest of Sorrow" (Siepen, Kürsch and Stauch)	3:39

2018 re-release bonus tracks
No.	Title	Length
23.	"Doom"	5:51
24.	"Harvest of Sorrow"	3:41
25.	"The Tides of War"	5:17

== Personnel ==
Blind Guardian

- Hansi Kürsch – lead and backing vocals
- André Olbrich – lead and acoustic guitar
- Marcus Siepen – rhythm guitar
- Thomas "Thomen" Stauch – drums

Guest musicians

- Oliver Holzwarth – bass
- Mathias Weisner – keyboards, orchestral effects
- Michael Schüren– grand piano
- Max Zelzner – flutes, alto flute
- Norman Eshley, Douglas Fielding – narration
- Billy King, Rolf Köhler, Olaf Senkbeil, Thomas Hackmann – choir

Production

- Blind Guardian – producers
- Flemming Rasmussen – mixing
- Charlie Bauerfeind – mixing of interludes
- Flemming Rasmussen, Charlie Bauerfeind and Piet Sielck – mixing engineers
- Charlie Bauerfeind – recording and engineering of drums, percussion, lead and backing vocals, bass guitars, piano and interludes
- Piet Sielck – recording and engineering of lead, rhythm and acoustic guitars, keyboards and orchestral effects
- Flemming Rasmussen – recording and engineering of vocals
- Cuny – recording and engineering of flutes, alto-flutes and vocals
- Andreas Marschall – cover and story paintings
- Thorsten Eichhorst – photos

== Charts ==
Chart (1998)	Peak position
Austrian Albums (Ö3 Austria)	39
German Albums (Offizielle Top 100)	7
Japanese Albums (Oricon)	12
Swedish Albums (Sverigetopplistan)	44

== See also ==
- Works inspired by J. R. R. Tolkien
