= Blind Guardian =

German power metal band

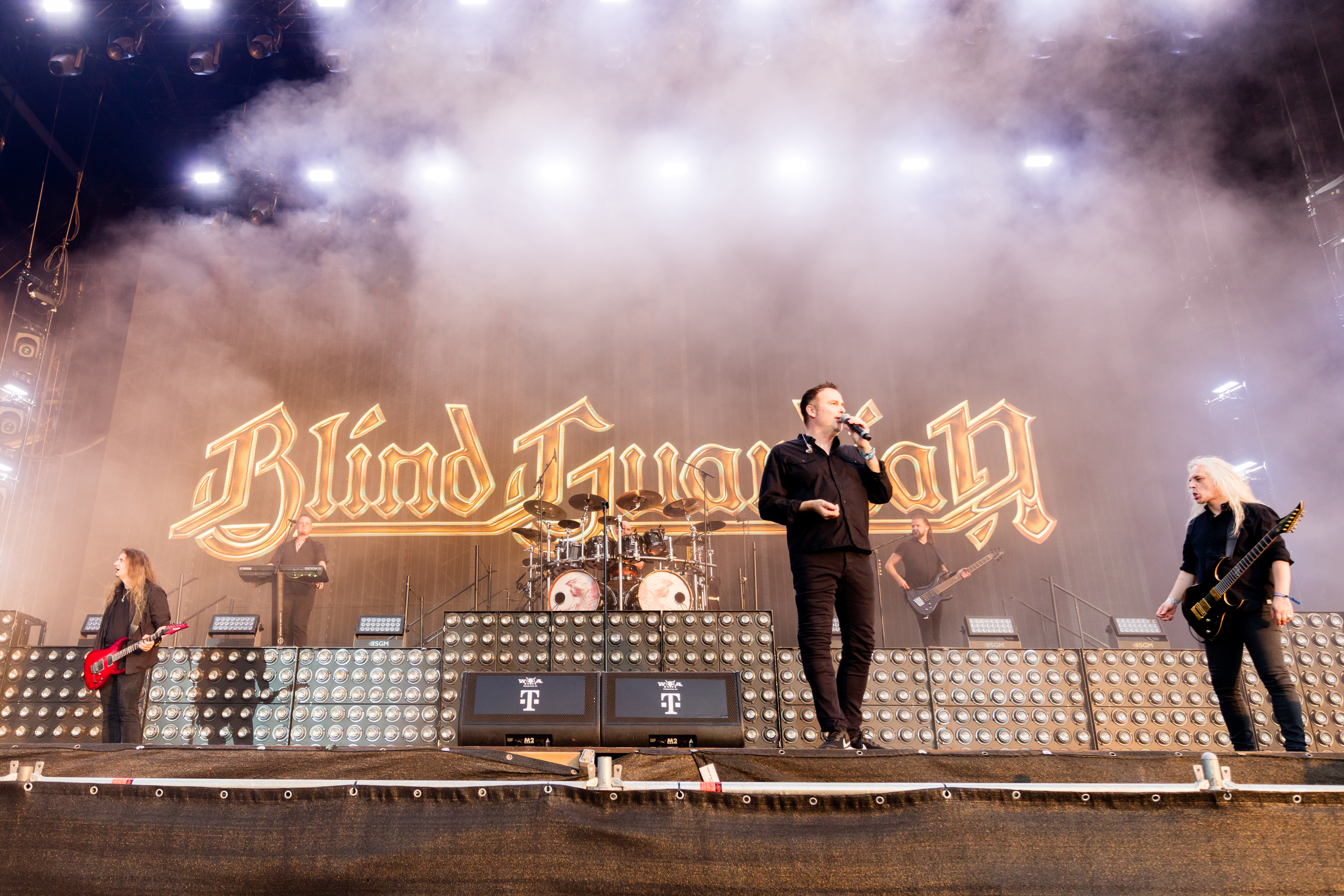
- Blind Guardian performing in 2024

Background information
- Also known as: Lucifer's Heritage (1984–1987)
- Origin: Krefeld, Germany
- Genres: Power metal; symphonic metal; speed metal; progressive metal
- Years active: 1984–present
- Labels: No Remorse; Virgin; Century Media; Nuclear Blast
- Members: Hansi Kürsch; André Olbrich; Marcus Siepen; Frederik Ehmke; Johan van Stratum
- Past members: Thomas Kelleners; Markus Dörk; Christof Theißen; Hans-Peter Frey; Thomas "Thomen" Stauch
- Website: blind-guardian.com

Blind Guardian is a German power metal band formed in 1984 in Krefeld, West Germany. They are often credited as one of the seminal and most influential bands in the power metal and speed metal subgenres. Nine musicians have been part of the band's lineup throughout its history, which currently includes singer Hansi Kürsch, guitarists André Olbrich and Marcus Siepen, and, since 2005, drummer Frederik Ehmke.

Blind Guardian is a key player in the German heavy metal scene that emerged in the mid-1980s. The band was formed in 1984 as Lucifer's Heritage by Kürsch (who also played bass at the time), Olbrich, fellow guitarist Markus Dörk, and drummer Thomas Stauch. Dörk and Stauch left the following year and were replaced by Christof Theißen and Hans-Peter Frey, respectively, who also departed before the year ended. In 1987, Siepen joined the group, and Stauch returned; this lineup, which lasted 18 years, led the band to change their name to Blind Guardian and release their debut album, Battalions of Fear, in 1988. They have since released ten more studio albums, as well as an orchestral album released under the name Blind Guardian Twilight Orchestra.

Through their discography, Blind Guardian has established themselves as a notable and successful band and as pioneers of the power metal movement. In 1996, Kürsch ceased playing bass to focus on vocals, with various session musicians filling in, primarily Oliver Holzwarth. However, in 2005, Stauch left the band, expressing disapproval of Blind Guardian's shift toward a more complex progressive sound with heavy backing vocals, and was replaced by Ehmke.

Most of Blind Guardian's albums have been well received by fans and critics. Somewhere Far Beyond (1992), Imaginations from the Other Side (1995), and Nightfall in Middle-Earth (1998) are regarded as influential. The music is primarily composed by Kürsch and Olbrich together, while the lyrics, penned by Kürsch, draw inspiration from J. R. R. Tolkien, Michael Moorcock, Stephen King, George R. R. Martin, Brandon Sanderson, and Robert Jordan, as well as traditional legends and epics. Over the years, a theme has developed that personifies the band members as traveling storytellers, leading fans to refer to them as "The Bards".

== History ==
=== Formation as Lucifer's Heritage (1984–1987) ===
Blind Guardian was formed in 1984 in Krefeld, West Germany, by Hansi Kürsch (vocals, bass) and André Olbrich (guitar) under the name Lucifer's Heritage, alongside Markus Dörk (guitar) and Thomen Stauch (drums). The band briefly expanded into a quintet with a second lead vocalist, Thomas Kelleners. However, after three months, Kelleners left the band by mutual agreement. Lucifer's Heritage released two demos in 1985 and 1986, despite undergoing chaotic lineup changes: Dörk and Stauch were replaced by Christof Theißen and Hans-Peter Frey, respectively. In 1987, Marcus Siepen joined, and Stauch returned to form the lineup that would remain consistent for the next 18 years.

=== Name change and rise to success (1988–1996) ===
After Lucifer's Heritage signed a contract with No Remorse Records, the band changed their name to Blind Guardian to avoid any speculation regarding Satanism. In their biography, the band noted that they also wanted to distance themselves from the black metal movement, as their demos had been placed alongside black metal albums in local record shops. The new name was inspired by the Fates Warning album Awaken the Guardian. They released their debut album, Battalions of Fear, in 1988, which was a speed metal album influenced by Helloween. These two German bands had close ties, and Helloween founder Kai Hansen made a guest appearance on Blind Guardian's second LP, Follow the Blind (1989), where the band revealed some thrash metal influences. Their third LP, Tales from the Twilight World (1990), showcased a much more melodic and "epic" sound, incorporating elements of choir and classical music.

Blind Guardian signed with Virgin Records in 1991 and released their fourth studio album, Somewhere Far Beyond, in 1992, followed by the live album Tokyo Tales in 1993. In 1994, Flemming Rasmussen, the former producer for Metallica, began working with the band, producing their fifth studio album, Imaginations from the Other Side, released in 1995, as well as The Forgotten Tales, an album that featured a mix of covers and original material, released in 1996.

=== Later years and drummer change (1997–2009) ===
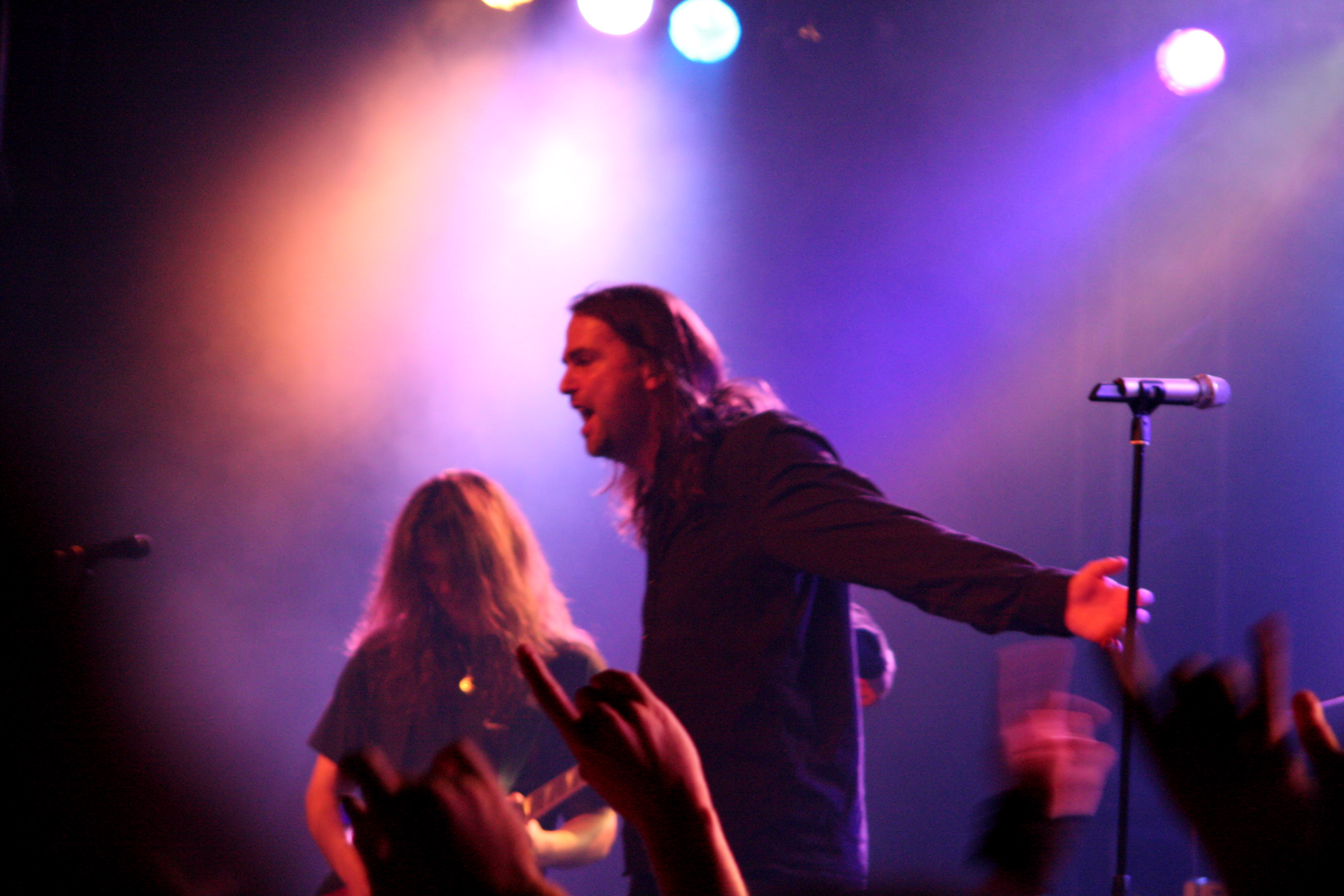
Lead vocalist Hansi Kürsch

In 1998, Blind Guardian released their epic album Nightfall in Middle-Earth. Described by Allmusic's Vincent Jeffries as "complete with anthemic choruses, spoken word storylines, and plenty of bombastic power metal punctuating every dramatic turn", he stated that "Nightfall in Middle-Earth is perhaps Blind Guardian's most triumphant" work. A concept album based on J. R. R. Tolkien's The Silmarillion, the music on Nightfall demonstrated some folk rock influence while also featuring heavy use of Queen-style layered backing vocals. Following the release of Nightfall, session member Oliver Holzwarth took over bass, allowing Kürsch to focus on vocals. This album also marked the last time Blind Guardian worked with producer Flemming Rasmussen.

Four years later, the band released A Night at the Opera, named after the Queen album. On this album, the band's sound largely departed from their original speed metal influences, instead embracing power and progressive metal with over-the-top orchestral backing and consistent vocal and guitar layering throughout. While not a true concept album, many of the lyrics explored common themes of religion and the relationships between human and divine powers. This was followed by a live album in 2003 and a DVD, Imaginations Through the Looking Glass, in 2004, which was the last recorded Blind Guardian material featuring Thomen Stauch on drums. He departed the band due to musical differences and was replaced with Frederik Ehmke. The first album with Ehmke was A Twist in the Myth, released in 2006.

Blind Guardian contributed to the soundtrack for the In the Name of the King: A Dungeon Siege Tale fantasy film directed by Uwe Boll, which was released in 2008. The band also recorded a theme song for Sacred 2: Fallen Angel, a role-playing video game and the sequel to Sacred.

=== At the Edge of Time and Beyond the Red Mirror (2010–2017) ===
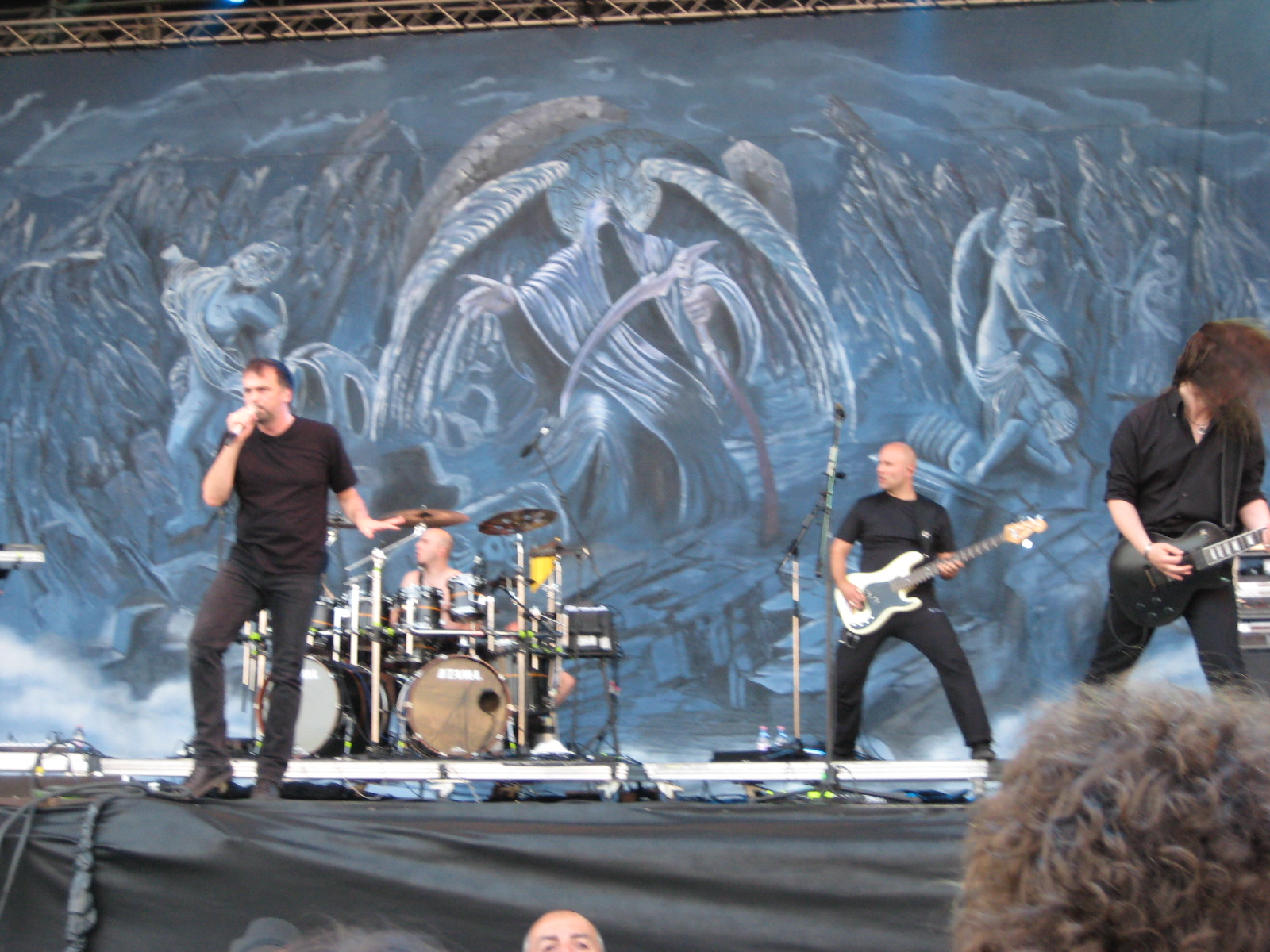
Blind Guardian in 2009

"A Voice in the Dark" was the next single from Blind Guardian, released on 25 June 2010. Following this, the album At the Edge of Time was released on 30 July 2010. To promote the album, the band embarked on "The Sacred Worlds and Songs Divine Tour 2010", with opening acts including Enforcer and Steelwing for European dates, while Holy Grail and Seven Kingdoms opened for the U.S. shows. The band also announced they would perform at Wacken Open Air in 2011.

On 21 July 2011, Hansi Kürsch revealed on Blind Guardian's official website that they were working on an orchestral album. On 1 September 2011, Oliver Holzwarth joined Rhapsody of Fire as a full-time member after 13 years as Blind Guardian's session bassist.

On 27 January 2012, Blind Guardian released a compilation album titled Memories of a Time to Come, featuring re-recorded and remixed songs from their entire discography. Almost exactly one year later, on 28 January 2013, they released a box set titled A Traveler's Guide to Space and Time, which included all of the band's studio, live, and compilation albums from 1988 to 2004, along with some previously unreleased material.

On 11 July 2012, Kürsch posted on the band's official website that they would cease touring after their performance at the Rockharz festival in Ballenstedt, which occurred two days later. In his announcement, he mentioned the desire to focus on a new record before returning to the road by 2014. He also wished to perform songs they had never played live before their next tour.

In October 2013, Blind Guardian was announced as the headliner for the Out & Loud Festival in Geiselwind on 31 May 2014. On 18 October 2013, Kürsch shared an update via the official website, stating he expected the new record to be produced by May 2014. He confirmed that the album was progressing well and mentioned nine new songs by name: Irish Hill (later titled Grand Parade), Encrypted Time, Prophecies, Holy Grail, Winter's Coming, The Throne, The Ocean, and Outcast, along with two others with uncertain titles, Song 9 and Midtempo Song.

The tenth Blind Guardian album, titled Beyond the Red Mirror, was released on 30 January 2015. The first single, "Twilight of the Gods", was released on 5 December 2014. On 28 January 2015, two days before the release of Beyond the Red Mirror, Blind Guardian announced Barend Courbois as their new session/live bassist on their official Facebook page.

The band recorded live shows during the 2015 European leg of the Beyond the Red Mirror tour for a new live album, Live Beyond the Spheres, which was released on 7 July 2017.

=== Legacy of the Dark Lands and The God Machine (2017–2023) ===
When asked in July 2017 about the next Blind Guardian studio album, Kürsch stated, "We haven't done too much songwriting for the next regular Blind Guardian album, but still, we've made some steps at least, and I can sense a strong change in comparison to what we did on the last album. There's one song called 'Architect of Doom,' which is a truly heavy track. Very powerful. Very thrashy at points. And there's another song called 'American Goth,' which is kind of what you would expect from Blind Guardian, but the way we maintained the drums and the orchestra—this song features orchestral elements—makes it feel distinctly different. I'm pretty sure that you will notice a significant change when you listen to these two albums, and from that point of view, yes, Live Beyond the Spheres is the end of an era." He also mentioned that they were working on an orchestral album, which was scheduled to be finished and released in 2016, but was delayed until 2019, followed by a "heavy album" slated for release in 2020.

The band's orchestral album, Legacy of the Dark Lands, was released on 1 November 2019, after Olbrich and Kürsch had conceived and written the project since 1996. It features only Kürsch as a performer, along with the Prague Philharmonic Orchestra, and is credited to the "Blind Guardian Twilight Orchestra" rather than the band's regular name.

In November 2021, it was announced that a new single, "Deliver Us from Evil", would be released on 3 December 2021, and that the band's forthcoming twelfth album would be released in September 2022. Kürsch told Nuclear Blast, "We know that the gap between now and the album release in late 2022 is painfully long. Neither we nor our label could defy the current worldwide economic crisis. A long story short: There is no one to blame for this situation... Talking about anticipation, even though 'Violent Shadows' and 'Deliver Us From Evil' are indisputably fantastic tracks, rest assured: We won't let you wait another ten months with only two songs. I promise you, you will always be blown away—cheers to the digital era and its endless possibilities. Oh, and the album title. There is one, but I won't tell you yet. This would be giving away far too much right now."

In July 2022, Jon Van Stratum replaced Barend Courbois as a session member. Despite persistent belief among some fans that he became a permanent member, Hansi Kürsch confirmed that he is only a live session member.

In May 2022, the title of the band's twelfth album was announced as The God Machine, along with a release date of 2 September 2022.

=== Upcoming 13th studio album (2024–present) ===
In a February 2024 interview with Australia's Subculture Entertainment, Kürsch revealed that Blind Guardian would commence "real songwriting" for their thirteenth studio album in 2025. When asked that same month if there would be "a shorter turnaround time" for the album, following a seven-year gap between Beyond the Red Mirror and The God Machine, Kürsch reiterated that the band would "keep [their] focus on regular songwriting" after their upcoming tour. Regarding a release date, he stated, "I don't know—I would be very surprised to find out that there's no new Blind Guardian album before '27, which is an accomplishment already, but I'm hoping for either late '25 or '26."

== Musical style ==
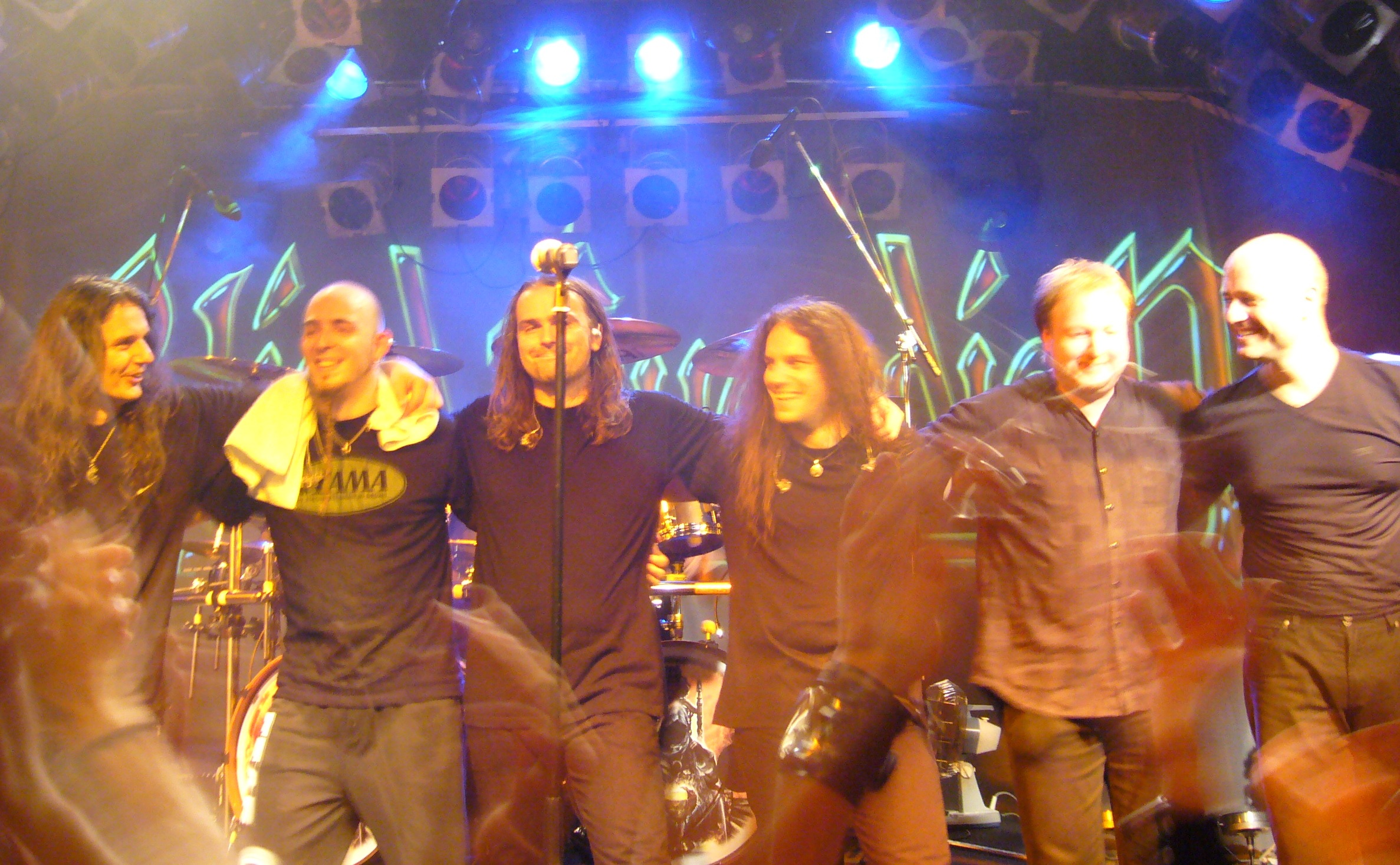
Blind Guardian in 2006

Blind Guardian are primarily a power metal band, even being described as one of the "big four" bands of the genre, alongside Helloween, Sabaton, and DragonForce. Their style has spanned symphonic metal, progressive metal, speed metal, heavy metal, and neoclassical metal. The band's first two albums, Battalions of Fear and Follow the Blind, were more in the style of thrash metal compared to their subsequent works. Beginning with their third album, Tales from the Twilight World, Blind Guardian wrote slower, more intricate compositions. By the time of their sixth album, Nightfall in Middle Earth, Hansi Kürsch ceased playing bass to concentrate solely on vocals. At this point, the band incorporated orchestral arrangements and overdubbing, influenced by English rock band Queen.

Blind Guardian's music features the staccato guitars and double bass drumming of power metal, along with overdubs and numerous backing vocals to create a rich and dense sound. This proved significant on all albums after the first two, but particularly on A Night at the Opera. Another defining feature of Blind Guardian's music is the frequent use of folk tunes and instruments, especially in power ballads such as "Lord of the Rings", "The Bard's Song", "A Past and Future Secret", "Skalds and Shadows", and "Curse My Name", among others.

=== Influences ===
The band was inspired by Helloween, and in its early releases, it also displayed influences from Iron Maiden and Metallica. According to guitarist Marcus Siepen, during the songwriting for Follow the Blind, they also listened to Bay Area thrash metal bands, such as Testament and Forbidden, resulting in a somewhat heavier sound.

Starting with their third album, Tales from the Twilight World, and continuing through Somewhere Far Beyond and Imaginations from the Other Side, Blind Guardian gradually incorporated more influences from progressive and classical music. Queen had a significant impact, particularly concerning the choir arrangements and harmonies, an effect notable on A Night at the Opera.

Singer Hansi Kürsch expressed the band's attraction to 1970s progressive rock, citing early Genesis, Gentle Giant, and ELP as key influences. However, regarding the genre, he sees more direct influences in progressive metal bands, particularly Fates Warning, Queensrÿche, and Savatage. The folkloric influences on Nightfall in Middle-Earth primarily stem from British rock band Jethro Tull.

== Side projects ==
Along with Jon Schaffer, the leader and founder of Iced Earth, Kürsch was a member of Demons & Wizards, where he served as the lead singer until its disbandment in early 2021 due to Schaffer's involvement in the January 6 U.S. Capitol attack.

Frederik Ehmke was a founding member of the band Sinbreed, in which Marcus Siepen was a session member. Later, in 2012, Siepen became a full member of the band.

Following the tsunami that struck Japan on 11 March 2011, Blind Guardian collaborated with their former record company, EMI Music, to auction an exclusive studio session for two at the Twilight Hall Studio in Grefrath, Germany, for charity. All proceeds were donated to tsunami relief efforts. The auction concluded on 22 April 2011 with a final bid of £1,171.00.

== Band members ==
Current

- Hansi Kürsch – lead vocals (1984, 1984–present), bass (1984–1996), backing vocals (1984)
- André Olbrich – lead guitar, backing vocals (1984–present)
- Marcus Siepen – rhythm guitar, backing vocals (1987–present)
- Frederik Ehmke – drums, percussion, flute, bagpipes (2005–present)

Current touring musician

- Johan van Stratum – bass, backing vocals (2021–present)

Current session musicians

- Thomas Hackmann – backing vocals (1990–present)
- Billy King – backing vocals (1992–present)
- Olaf Senkbeil – backing vocals (1997–present)
- Matthias Ulmer – keyboards, piano (2007–present)
- Kenneth Berger – keyboards (2023–present)

Former

- Thomas Kelleners – lead vocals (1984)
- Markus Dörk – rhythm guitar (1984–1986)
- Christoph Theissen – rhythm guitar (1986; died 2013)
- Hans-Peter Frey – drums, percussion (1986)
- Thomas "Thomen" Stauch – drums, percussion (1984–1986, 1987–2005)

Former session/touring musicians

- Mathias Wiesner – keyboards (1989–2002), bass (1992–1993)
- Rolf Köhler – backing vocals (1990–2007; died 2007)
- Marc Zee – keyboards, backing vocals (1993)
- Oliver Holzwarth – bass (1997–2011)
- Alex Holzwarth – drums (2002–2003)
- Pat Bender – keyboards, sound effects (2002–2006)
- Barend Courbois – bass, backing vocals (2011–2021)
- Michael "Mi" Schüren – keyboards (1997–2023)

== Discography ==
- Battalions of Fear (1988)
- Follow the Blind (1989)
- Tales from the Twilight World (1990)
- Somewhere Far Beyond (1992)
- Imaginations from the Other Side (1995)
- Nightfall in Middle-Earth (1998)
- A Night at the Opera (2002)
- A Twist in the Myth (2006)
- At the Edge of Time (2010)
- Beyond the Red Mirror (2015)
- Legacy of the Dark Lands (2019)
- The God Machine (2022)
