= Kalle Trapp =

German producer and audio engineer

Karl-Heinz "Kalle" Trapp is a German former music engineer and producer, and owner of the Karo Studio in Münster.

The federal state North Rhine-Westphalia became breeding ground for most German metal bands in the 1980s, with Trapp being referred to as "one of the main power metal producers of the 1980s and '90s". He became especially known as recurring producer of Blind Guardian's records, also credited as backing vocalist on several Blind Guardian albums. According to Andy Ergün of Grinder, Trapp also recommended that No Remorse Records sign Blind Guardian to release their first record.

Trapp also produced or engineered albums by thrash metal bands such as Sieges Even, Destruction,,Drifter and Paradox; death metal such as Malleus Maleficarum by Dutch Pestilence, as well as heavy metal and hard rock such as Mad Max, Saxon and Uriah Heep.

When retiring as a producer, Trapp also closed Karo Studios.
