= Marcus Siepen =

German guitarist (born 1968)

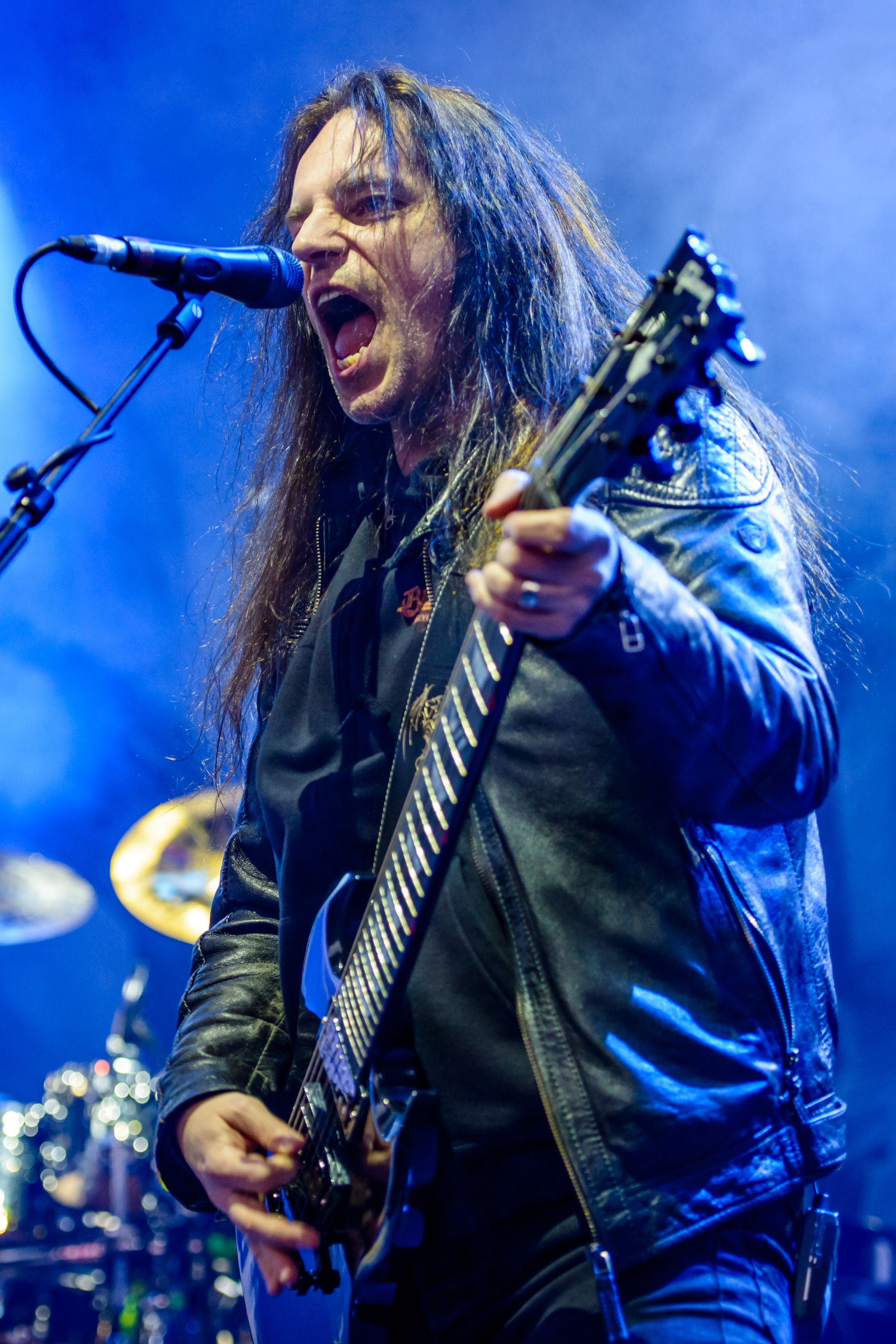
- Siepen in 2016

Background information
- Born: 8 September 1968 (age 56); Krefeld/Hüls, West Germany
- Genres: Power metal, speed metal, heavy metal
- Occupations: Guitarist
- Years active: 1984–present
- Labels: No Remorse, Virgin, Century Media, Nuclear Blast
- Website: marcussiepen.com

Marcus Siepen (born 8 September 1968) is a German guitarist, best known as the rhythm guitarist and backing vocalist of power metal band Blind Guardian. For the biggest percentage of Blind Guardian's songs, particularly in more recent years, he has almost strictly played rhythm guitar, with most lead and solo work being performed by André Olbrich. He has also been part of the band Sinbreed and live member of Demons & Wizards.

== Personal life ==
Siepen is divorced and has a son from his first marriage. He has since remarried. Growing up in a Roman Catholic family, Siepen claims to not be religious, and that he doesn't believe in God. He views Jesus Christ as a human philosopher, "a very charismatic person with a great view of how people should live together."

== Equipment ==
Since 1995, Siepen has been an endorser of Mesa/Boogie amplifiers, using various Triple Rectifier heads and multiple preamps.

As of 2010, his main rack consisted of a Triple Rectifier "Recto Reborn" head, with a Fractal Audio Axe-FX II providing effects. He uses two Sennheiser wireless units, one as a backup, and his old two-channel Rectifier as a backup. When doing overseas shows, he solely uses an Axe-FX II. Previous versions of his rack featured the two-channel Triple Rectifier as his main amplifier, a Rocktron Intelliflex instead of the Fractal for effects, and either a Mesa/Boogie TriAxis preamp or Rectifier Recording Preamp instead of his two-channel Triple Rectifier as a backup.

For guitars, Siepen has made most use of Gibson and ESP Guitars, with Gibson being his preferred brand nowadays. Up until the late '90s, Siepen mostly used ESP guitars with Blind Guardian co-guitarist André Olbrich, both guitarists making use of custom-made Horizon and Mirage guitars, although Siepen has been seen using other shapes, such as a custom-built model based on the Jackson Randy Rhoads. He can sometimes be seen with a custom ESP Eclipse, but he does not use this model often.

His current main guitars, since then, have been several Gibsons, mostly Les Paul models, his main two being a Les Paul Custom and a Les Paul Standard Premium Plus. Most of his guitars, including the previously two mentioned models, feature dual EMG 81 pickups, Suhr Doug Aldrich pickups, and TonePros hardware.
