= Hansi Kürsch =

German heavy metal singer

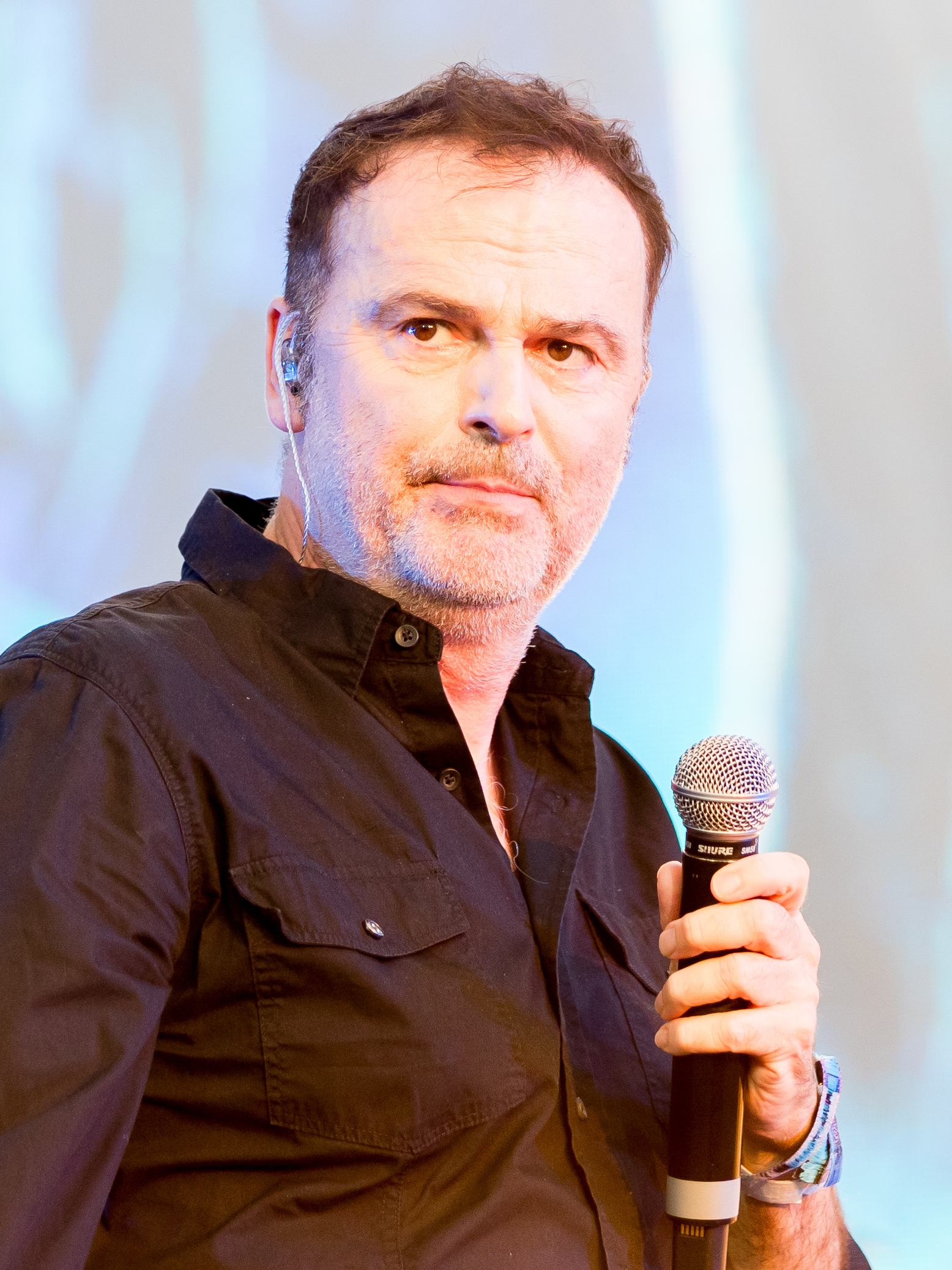
- Kürsch performing with Blind Guardian in 2024

Background information
- Born: Hans Jürgen Kürsch; 10 August 1966 (age 60); Lank-Latum, West Germany
- Genres: Power metal; speed metal; progressive metal; symphonic metal
- Occupations: Singer; songwriter
- Years active: 1984–present
- Member of: Blind Guardian
- Formerly of: Demons & Wizards

Hans Jürgen "Hansi" Kürsch (born 10 August 1966) is a German singer, best known as a member of the power metal band Blind Guardian. One of the founders of the band, he has been its lead vocalist since its creation in 1984, and also acted as the band's bass guitarist until 1996.

He is also the former lead vocalist of Demons & Wizards, a side-project with Iced Earth guitarist Jon Schaffer until his departure from the project in 2021. Additionally, he has worked prominently as a guest with other artists, including Angra, Edguy, Iced Earth, and Therion; he notably played characters in the Ayreon albums 01011001 and The Source.

== Early life ==
Kürsch was born on 10 August 1966 in Lank-Latum, near Düsseldorf, to a working-class family in West Germany. He is the youngest of four siblings. He was raised in the suburb of Lank-Latum, near a castle called Burg Linn. Having spent his childhood playing football near the castle nurtured his love and passion both for football, as well as fantasy and fairytales, which later became the main source for his lyrics.

By the time he was ten, Kürsch discovered his love for music, specifically classic rock bands, such as the Electric Light Orchestra, Genesis or Queen. However, the turning point for him was coming across Deep Purple’s 24 Carat Purple for the first time, which not only started his love for hard rock music, but also introduced him to bands like The Who, Led Zeppelin, and others. He lists Ian Gillan, Freddie Mercury, and Peter Gabriel as his favorite singers, and the ones who influenced him the most.

== Artistry ==
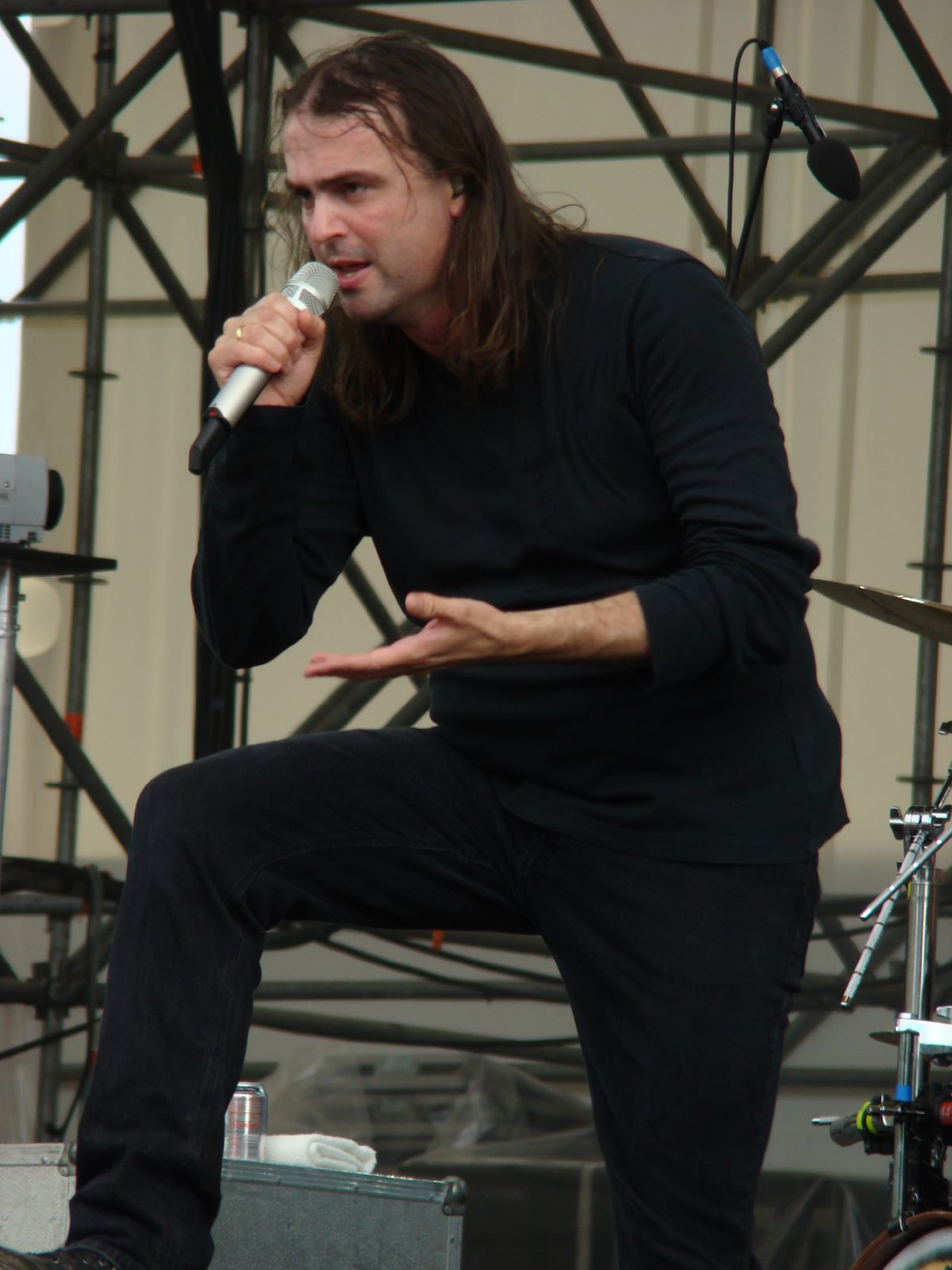
Kürsch in 2007

A signature of Kürsch's songwriting is his practice of overdubbing his own voice multiple times in complex, overlapping harmonies on his recordings, creating the atmosphere of a huge choir. The track "Chant" on the first Demons & Wizards album is vocal only, in the style of a traditional Gregorian chant; Kürsch's is the only voice on the song.

Kürsch's lyrics revolve around various themes prevalent in the power metal genre, including medieval fantasy, J. R. R. Tolkien, religious/mythological tales, and legends/stories, both his own and from the literary world. His lyrics in the first Demons & Wizards album tackle various themes, whereas "Touched by the Crimson King" was based primarily off different fantasy novels.

Although mostly known for being a clean singer nowadays, Kürsch's early technique made use of a harsher, "screaming" technique. He can be heard using similar, more aggressive, technique while singing guest vocals for Heaven Shall Burn's cover of "Valhalla".

== Personal life ==
In 1984, while being a Commerce School student, and on the same day Kürsch met his current bandmate and Blind Guardian cofounder, André Olbrich, he became aware of a female student called Andrea, whom he later married in 1991. Their son, Jonas, was born in 2001. Kürsch still resides in Krefeld together with his wife and son.

== Discography ==
Blind Guardian

Demons & Wizards

- Demons & Wizards – Demons & Wizards (2000)
- Demons & Wizards – Touched by the Crimson King (2005)
- Demons & Wizards – III (2020)
