= André Olbrich =

German guitarist

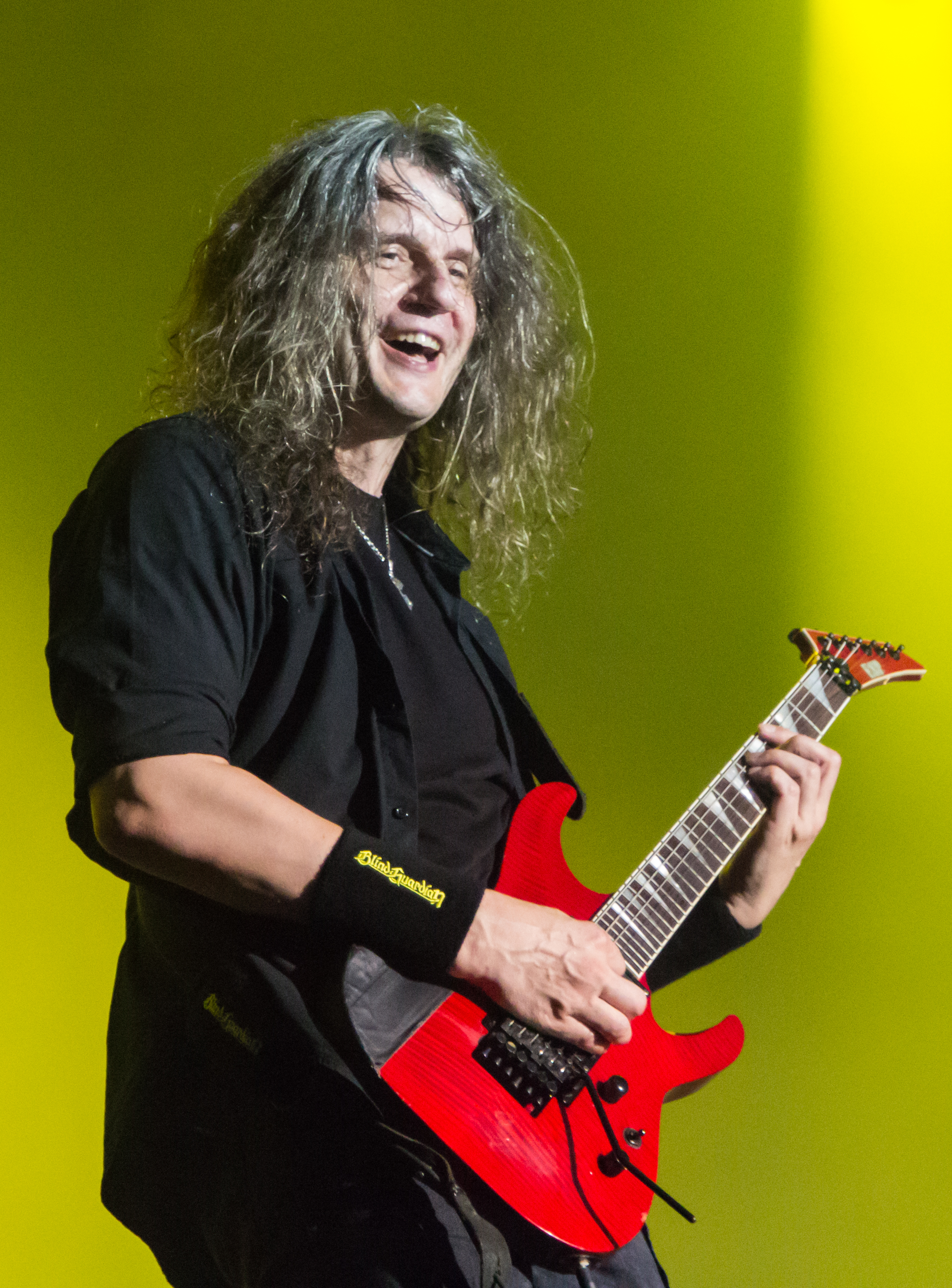
- Olbrich in 2014

Background information
- Born: 3 May 1967 (age 59); Düsseldorf, West Germany
- Genres: Power metal, speed metal, heavy metal
- Occupations: Musician, songwriter
- Instrument: Guitar
- Years active: 1984–present
- Member of: Blind Guardian

André Olbrich (born 3 May 1967) is a German musician, best known as the co-founder and lead guitarist of power metal band Blind Guardian, in which he serves as one of the main composers with other founder Hansi Kürsch.

Olbrich was ranked number 76 out of 100 Greatest Heavy Metal Guitarists of All Time by Guitar World. He is also ranked number 64 in Joel McIver's The 100 Greatest Metal Guitarists. Olbrich's guitar work often reflects vocalist Hansi Kürsch's singing.

Olbrich's style is influenced by his favourite bands, which include Queen, Judas Priest, Metallica and Black Sabbath. Additionally, Olbrich relies heavily on staccato technique.

== Equipment ==
Olbrich's gear

- ESP Guitars Original Series Horizon Custom
1. Body: Alder
2. Neck: Maple (Neck-thru)
3. Pickups: 2x EMG 81
4. Floyd Rose Tremolo System
5. 24 Jumbo Frets
6. Original Jackson-style pointed headstock
- ESP Guitars Original Series M-II Neck Thru
1. Body: Alder with Maple Top
2. Neck: Maple (Neck-thru)
3. Pickups: 1x EMG 81 (bridge) 1x EMG SA (neck)
4. Floyd Rose Tremolo System
5. 24 Jumbo Frets
- ESP Guitars Original Series Explorer Custom
1. Body: Mahogany
2. Neck: Maple (Neck-thru)
3. Pickups: 2x EMG 81
4. Floyd Rose Tremolo System
5. 24 Jumbo Frets
- Ovation Guitar Legend
1. Strings: D'Addario .010 - .046
2. Picks: Jim Dunlop Nylon 1 MM
3. Amp: Engl Straight
4. Cabinets: 2x Marshall 1960 ( A & B )
- Amplification

He is believed to use Marshall amps for his distortion/lead riffs:

1. Marshall JCM 900 Dual Reverb
2. Marshall TSL 60 (Triple Super Lead)
3. Marshall cabinets 4x12 (with Celestion V30 speakers)
- Rack
1. ENGL savage
2. Furman Powerconditioner
3. Shure LX Wireless System
4. Rocktron Patchmate
5. Yamaha SPX 990
6. Ibanez Tubescreamer
7. Hughes & Kettner "Red Box" Pro
8. Morley Power Wah
9. Dunlop crybaby 535q (used during A Twist In The Myth tour)
10. Boss AC2 Acoustic Simulator

== Trivia ==
In 2020, Russian malacologist Alexander Fedosov named four new species of Clavus canalicularis mollusk in honour of four rock guitarists. One of them, Clavus andreolbrichi, was named in honour of Andre Olbrich.
