= Håkan Nordbäck =

Swedish cross-country skier

Personal information
- Full name: Erik Håkan Nordbäck
- Nationality: Sweden
- Born: 23 February 1969 (age 57)

Sport
- Sport: Skiing

World Cup career
- Seasons: 9 – (1994, 1996–2003)
- Indiv. starts: 47
- Indiv. podiums: 0
- Team starts: 15
- Team podiums: 2
- Team wins: 0
- Overall titles: 0 – (33rd in 1996)
- Discipline titles: 0
- Updated on 3 April 2019

Håkan Nordbäck (born 23 February 1969) is a Swedish former cross-country skier who competed from 1994 to 2003. His best World Cup finish was sixth in a 15 km event in the Czech Republic in 2000.

== Cross-country skiing results ==
All results are sourced from the International Ski Federation (FIS).

=== World Cup ===
==== Season standings ====
| Season | Age | | | | | |
| Season | Age | Overall | Distance | Long Distance | Middle Distance | Sprint |
|---|---|---|---|---|---|---|
| 1994 | 25 | NC | —N/a | —N/a | —N/a | —N/a |
| 1995 | 26 | 54 | —N/a | —N/a | —N/a | —N/a |
| 1996 | 27 | 33 | —N/a | —N/a | —N/a | —N/a |
| 1997 | 28 | 53 | —N/a | NC | —N/a | 38 |
| 1998 | 29 | 68 | —N/a | — | —N/a | 56 |
| 1999 | 30 | NC | —N/a | NC | —N/a | — |
| 2000 | 31 | 34 | —N/a | 17 | 27 | NC |
| 2001 | 32 | NC | —N/a | —N/a | —N/a | — |
| 2002 | 33 | NC | —N/a | —N/a | —N/a | — |
| 2003 | 34 | NC | —N/a | —N/a | —N/a | — |

==== Team podiums ====
- 2 podiums – (1 RL, 1 TS)

| No. | Season | Date | Location | Race | Level | Place | Teammate(s) |
|---|---|---|---|---|---|---|---|
| 1 | 1996–97 | 19 January 1997 | Lahti, Finland | 12 × 1.5 km Team Sprint F | World Cup | 3rd | Ingesson |
| 2 | 1999–00 | 19 December 1999 | Davos, Switzerland | 4 × 10 km Relay C | World Cup | 2nd | Jonsson / Fredriksson / Lindgren |
