= Morgan Göransson =

Swedish cross-country skier

Personal information
- Full name: Morgan Erik Vilhelm Göransson
- Nationality: Sweden
- Born: 24 November 1972 (age 53) Frösön, Sweden

Sport
- Sport: Skiing
- Club: Åsarna IK

World Cup career
- Seasons: 9 – (1994–2002)
- Indiv. starts: 73
- Indiv. podiums: 0
- Team starts: 15
- Team podiums: 3
- Team wins: 0
- Overall titles: 0 – (33rd in 1995)
- Discipline titles: 0
Medal record
Men's cross-country skiing
Representing Sweden
Junior World Championships
Gold medal – first place	1992 Vuokatti	4 × 10 km relay
Bronze medal – third place	1991 Reit im Winkl	4 × 10 km relay
- Updated on 3 April 2019

Morgan Göransson (born 24 November 1972) is a Swedish cross-country skier who competed from 1993 to 2002. His best World Cup finish was fifth in a 10 km event in Italy in 1994.

Göransson also competed in at the 2002 Winter Olympics in Salt Lake City where he finished 13th in the 4 ×10 km relay event, 27th in the 15 km event, and not finishing the 30 km event. He finished 23rd in the 10 km + 10 km combined pursuit at the FIS Nordic World Ski Championships 2001 in Lahti.

== Cross-country skiing results ==
All results are sourced from the International Ski Federation (FIS).

=== Olympic Games ===
Year	Age	15 km	Pursuit	30 km	50 km	Sprint	4 × 10 km relay
2002	29	27	DNS	DNF	—	—	13

=== World Championships ===
Year	Age	15 km	Pursuit	30 km	50 km	Sprint	4 × 10 km relay
2001	28	—	23	—	—	—	—

=== World Cup ===
==== Season standings ====
Season	Age					
Season	Age	Overall	Distance	Long Distance	Middle Distance	Sprint
1994	21	NC	—N/a	—N/a	—N/a	—N/a
1995	22	33	—N/a	—N/a	—N/a	—N/a
1996	23	39	—N/a	—N/a	—N/a	—N/a
1997	24	69	—N/a	41	—N/a	NC
1998	25	86	—N/a	NC	—N/a	70
1999	26	68	—N/a	63	—N/a	74
2000	27	41	—N/a	66	49	12
2001	28	46	—N/a	—N/a	—N/a	46
2002	29	81	—N/a	—N/a	—N/a	56

==== Team podiums ====
- 3 podiums

No.	Season	Date	Location	Race	Level	Place	Teammates
1	1994–95	18 December 1994	Sappada, Italy	4 × 10 km Relay F	World Cup	3rd	Mogren / Majbäck / Forsberg
2	1995–96	10 December 1995	Davos, Switzerland	4 × 10 km Relay C	World Cup	3rd	Jonsson / Bergström / Mogren
3	2000–01	18 March 2001	Falun, Sweden	4 × 10 km Relay C/F	World Cup	2nd	Lindgren / Fredriksson / Elofsson
