= Henrik Forsberg =

Swedish cross-country skier and biathlete

Personal information
- Full name: Hans Henrik Forsberg
- Nationality: Sweden
- Born: 16 February 1967 (age 59) Borlänge, Sweden
- Spouse: Magdalena Forsberg (m. 1996)

Sport
- Sport: Skiing
- Club: Bergeforsen SK

World Cup career
- Seasons: 12 – (1988–1999)
- Indiv. starts: 88
- Indiv. podiums: 5
- Indiv. wins: 1
- Team starts: 27
- Team podiums: 14
- Team wins: 1
- Overall titles: 0 – (6th in 1991)
- Discipline titles: 0
Medal record
Men's cross-country skiing
Representing Sweden
Junior World Championships
Silver medal – second place	1987 Asiago	3 × 10 km relay
- Updated on 3 April 2019

Henrik Forsberg (born 16 February 1967) is a Swedish former cross-country skier and biathlete who competed from 1988 to 2001. Competing in four Winter Olympics, he earned his best finishes at the 1992 Winter Olympics in Albertville in cross-country skiing with a fourth in the 4 × 10 km relay and ninth in the 10 km + 15 km combined pursuit.

Forsberg's best finish at the FIS Nordic World Ski Championships was fifth in the 50 km event at Thunder Bay, Ontario in 1995. His lone World Cup victory was in a 30 km event in Sweden in 1991.

At the 2002 Winter Olympics in Salt Lake City, Forsberg finished 14th in the 4 × 7.5 km relay and 47th in the 20 km individual events. His best finishes at the Biathlon World Championships was 12th in the 4 × 7.5 km relay at Lahti in 2000 and his best individual finish of 24th in the 20 km individual event at Pokljuka in 2001. Forsberg's best individual finish was second in a 10 km sprint event in Slovakia during the 2001–02 season.

Forsberg's wife, Magdalena, competed from 1988 to 1996 in cross-country skiing, and 1993 to 2002 in biathlon. They married in mid-1996.

== Cross-country skiing results ==
All results are sourced from the International Ski Federation (FIS).

=== Olympic Games ===
Year	Age	10 km	Pursuit	30 km	50 km	4 × 10 km relay
1992	25	12	9	—	37	4
1994	27	—	—	12	—	6
1998	31	56	31	25	DNF	4

=== World Championships ===
Year	Age	10 km	15 km	Pursuit	30 km	50 km	4 × 10 km relay
1991	24	—	—	—N/a	—	8	—
1995	28	—	—N/a	—	21	5	—
1997	30	10	—N/a	11	11	9	5
1999	32	—	—N/a	—	—	20	—

=== World Cup ===
==== Season standings ====
Season	Age			
Season	Age	Overall	Long Distance	Sprint
1988	21	27	—N/a	—N/a
1989	22	20	—N/a	—N/a
1990	23	11	—N/a	—N/a
1991	24	6	—N/a	—N/a
1992	25	26	—N/a	—N/a
1993	26	36	—N/a	—N/a
1994	27	34	—N/a	—N/a
1995	28	12	—N/a	—N/a
1996	29	24	—N/a	—N/a
1997	30	14	21	10
1998	31	13	26	6
1999	32	47	42	60

==== Individual podiums ====
- 1 victory
- 5 podiums

No.	Season	Date	Location	Race	Level	Place
1	1990–91	9 December 1990	Tauplitzalm, Austria	10 km + 15 km Individual C/F	World Cup	3rd
2	1990–91	5 January 1991	Minsk, Soviet Union	15 km Individual F	World Cup	3rd
3	1990–91	9 March 1991	Falun, Sweden	30 km Individual F	World Cup	1st
4	1994–95	20 December 1994	Sappada, Italy	10 km Individual F	World Cup	2nd
5	1996–97	19 January 1997	Lahti, Finland	30 km Individual C	World Cup	3rd

==== Team podiums ====
- 1 victory – (1 RL)
- 14 podiums – (14 RL)

No.	Season	Date	Location	Race	Level	Place	Teammates
1	1987–88	17 March 1988	Oslo, Norway	4 × 10 km Relay C	World Cup	3rd	Eriksson / Håland / Kohlberg
2	1989–90	1 March 1990	Lahti, Finland	4 × 10 km Relay F	World Cup	3rd	Ottosson / Mogren / Håland
3	1989–90	11 March 1990	Örnsköldsvik, Sweden	4 × 10 km Relay C/F	World Cup	1st	Ottosson / Majbäck / Mogren
4	1989–90	16 March 1990	Vang, Norway	4 × 10 km Relay C	World Cup	2nd	Mogren / Håland / Majbäck
5	1990–91	1 March 1991	Lahti, Finland	4 × 10 km Relay C/F	World Cup	2nd	Eriksson / Svan / Mogren
6	1991–92	8 March 1992	Funäsdalen, Sweden	4 × 10 km Relay C	World Cup	3rd	Ponsiluoma / Ottosson / Mogren
7	1993–94	13 March 1994	Falun, Sweden	4 × 10 km Relay F	World Cup	3rd	Bergström / Mogren / Håland
8	1994–95	18 December 1994	Sappada, Italy	4 × 10 km Relay F	World Cup	3rd	Göransson / Mogren / Majbäck
9	1994–95	15 January 1995	Nové Město, Czech Republic	4 × 10 km Relay C	World Cup	2nd	Fredriksson / Jonsson / Majbäck
10	1994–95	5 February 1995	Falun, Sweden	4 × 10 km Relay F	World Cup	3rd	Fredriksson / Bergström / Håland
11	1994–95	12 February 1995	Oslo, Norway	4 × 5 km Relay C/F	World Cup	2nd	Fredriksson / Jonsson / Mogren
12	1996–97	8 December 1996	Davos, Switzerland	4 × 10 km Relay C	World Cup	2nd	Fredriksson / Bergström / Jonsson
13	1996–97	9 March 1997	Falun, Sweden	4 × 10 km Relay C/F	World Cup	3rd	Fredriksson / Mogren / Bergström
14	1997–98	7 December 1997	Santa Caterina, Italy	4 × 10 km Relay F	World Cup	3rd	Bergström / Elofsson / Mogren
