= Christer Majbäck =

Swedish cross-country skier

Personal information
- Full name: Sven Christer Majbäck
- Nationality: Sweden
- Born: 30 January 1964 (age 62) Jukkasjärvi, Sweden

Sport
- Sport: Skiing
- Club: Jukkasjärvi IF

World Cup career
- Seasons: 14 – (1985–1997, 1999)
- Indiv. starts: 93
- Indiv. podiums: 11
- Indiv. wins: 1
- Team starts: 21
- Team podiums: 13
- Team wins: 6
- Overall titles: 0 – (5th in 1990)
- Discipline titles: 0
Medal record
Men's cross-country skiing
Representing Sweden
International nordic ski competitions
| Event | 1st | 2nd | 3rd |
|---|---|---|---|
| Olympic Games | 0 | 0 | 1 |
| World Championships | 1 | 2 | 2 |
| Total | 1 | 2 | 3 |
Olympic Games
| Bronze medal – third place | 1992 Albertville | 10 km classical |
World Championships
| Gold medal – first place | 1989 Lahti | 4 × 10 km relay |
| Silver medal – second place | 1991 Val di Fiemme | 10 km classical |
| Silver medal – second place | 1991 Val di Fiemme | 4 × 10 km relay |
| Bronze medal – third place | 1987 Oberstdorf | 30 km classical |
| Bronze medal – third place | 1989 Lahti | 30 km classical |
- Updated on 3 April 2019

Christer Majbäck (born 30 January 1964) is a Swedish former cross-country skier who competed at international top level from 1984 to 1999. He won a bronze medal in 10 km at the 1992 Winter Olympics in Albertville.

Majbäck's biggest successes were at the FIS Nordic World Ski Championships where earned five medals, including one gold (4 × 10 km relay: 1989), two silvers (10 km, 4 × 10 km relay: both 1991), and two bronzes (30 km: 1987, 1989).

He also won two World Cup and FIS Races in his career (1989, 1997)

Majbäck is currently the owner and President of Skigo AB which manufactures and distributes the Skigo brand of wax, poles and other skiing products.

== Cross-country skiing results ==
All results are sourced from the International Ski Federation (FIS).

=== Olympic Games ===
- 1 medal – (1 bronze)

| Year | Age | 10 km | 15 km | Pursuit | 30 km | 50 km | 4 × 10 km relay |
|---|---|---|---|---|---|---|---|
| 1988 | 24 | —N/a | 11 | —N/a | — | — | — |
| 1992 | 28 | Bronze | —N/a | 6 | 6 | 16 | 4 |
| 1994 | 30 | 19 | —N/a | 23 | — | 6 | 6 |

=== World Championships ===
- 5 medals – (1 gold, 2 silver, 2 bronze)

| Year | Age | 10 km | 15 km classical | 15 km freestyle | Pursuit | 30 km | 50 km | 4 × 10 km relay |
|---|---|---|---|---|---|---|---|---|
| 1987 | 23 | —N/a | DSQ | —N/a | —N/a | Bronze | — | — |
| 1989 | 25 | —N/a | 13 | — | —N/a | Bronze | — | Gold |
| 1991 | 27 | Silver | —N/a | — | —N/a | 10 | 14 | Silver |
| 1993 | 29 | 14 | —N/a | —N/a | 25 | 12 | 15 | — |
| 1995 | 31 | — | —N/a | —N/a | — | 20 | 17 | — |

=== World Cup ===
==== Season standings ====
| Season | Age | | | |
| Season | Age | Overall | Long Distance | Sprint |
|---|---|---|---|---|
| 1985 | 21 | 15 | —N/a | —N/a |
| 1986 | 22 | 7 | —N/a | —N/a |
| 1987 | 23 | 11 | —N/a | —N/a |
| 1988 | 24 | 16 | —N/a | —N/a |
| 1989 | 25 | 8 | —N/a | —N/a |
| 1990 | 26 | 5 | —N/a | —N/a |
| 1991 | 27 | 11 | —N/a | —N/a |
| 1992 | 28 | 9 | —N/a | —N/a |
| 1993 | 29 | 14 | —N/a | —N/a |
| 1994 | 30 | 22 | —N/a | —N/a |
| 1995 | 31 | 29 | —N/a | —N/a |
| 1996 | 32 | NC | —N/a | —N/a |
| 1997 | 33 | 77 | 68 | 48 |
| 1999 | 35 | 100 | NC | — |

==== Individual podiums ====
- 1 victory
- 11 podiums

| No. | Season | Date | Location | Race | Level | Place |
|---|---|---|---|---|---|---|
| 1 | 1984–85 | 23 February 1985 | Syktyvkar, Soviet Union | 15 km Individual | World Cup | 3rd |
| 2 | 1986–87 | 20 December 1986 | Davos, Switzerland | 30 km Individual C | World Cup | 3rd |
| 3 | 1986–87 | 10 January 1987 | Canmore, Canada | 15 km Individual C | World Cup | 3rd |
| 4 | 1986–87 | 12 February 1987 | Oberstdorf, West Germany | 30 km Individual C | World Championships^{[1]} | 3rd |
| 5 | 1987–88 | 9 January 1988 | Kavgolovo, Soviet Union | 30 km Individual C | World Cup | 3rd |
| 6 | 1988–89 | 18 February 1989 | Lahti, Finland | 30 km Individual C | World Championships^{[1]} | 3rd |
| 7 | 1989–90 | 16 December 1989 | Canmore, Canada | 15 km Individual F | World Cup | 1st |
| 8 | 1989–90 | 6 March 1990 | Trondheim, Norway | 15 km Individual C | World Cup | 3rd |
| 9 | 1990–91 | 19 December 1990 | Les Saisies, France | 30 km Individual C | World Cup | 3rd |
| 10 | 1990–91 | 11 February 1991 | Val di Fiemme, Italy | 10 km Individual C | World Championships^{[1]} | 2nd |
| 11 | 1991–92 | 13 February 1992 | Les Saisies, France | 10 km Individual C | Olympic Games^{[1]} | 3rd |

==== Team podiums ====
- 6 victories
- 13 podiums

| No. | Season | Date | Location | Race | Level | Place | Teammate(s) |
|---|---|---|---|---|---|---|---|
| 1 | 1985–86 | 13 March 1986 | Oslo, Norway | 4 × 10 km Relay F | World Cup | 3rd | Wassberg / Håland / Danielsson |
| 2 | 1986–87 | 8 March 1987 | Falun, Sweden | 4 × 10 km Relay C | World Cup | 1st | Östlund / Mogren / Wassberg |
| 3 | 1987–88 | 13 March 1988 | Falun, Sweden | 4 × 10 km Relay F | World Cup | 1st | Ottosson / Svan / Mogren |
| 4 | 1987–88 | 17 March 1988 | Oslo, Norway | 4 × 10 km Relay C | World Cup | 2nd | Ottosson / Mogren / Svan |
| 5 | 1988–89 | 24 February 1989 | Lahti, Finland | 4 × 10 km Relay C/F | World Championships (Note: Until the 1999 World Championships and the 1994 Olympics, World Championship and Olympic races were included in the World Cup scoring system.) | 1st | Svan / Håland / Mogren |
| 6 | 1988–89 | 5 March 1989 | Oslo, Norway | 4 × 10 km Relay F | World Cup | 1st | Eriksson / Mogren / Håland |
| 7 | 1988–89 | 12 March 1989 | Falun, Sweden | 4 × 10 km Relay C | World Cup | 2nd | Poromaa / Håland / Mogren |
| 8 | 1989–90 | 11 March 1990 | Örnsköldsvik, Sweden | 4 × 10 km Relay C/F | World Cup | 1st | Ottosson / Forsberg / Mogren |
| 9 | 1989–90 | 16 March 1990 | Vang, Norway | 4 × 10 km Relay C | World Cup | 2nd | Mogren / Håland / Forsberg |
| 10 | 1990–91 | 15 February 1991 | Val di Fiemme, Italy | 4 × 10 km Relay C/F | World Championships | 2nd | Eriksson / Svan / Mogren |
| 11 | 1992–93 | 5 March 1993 | Lahti, Finland | 4 × 10 km Relay C | World Cup | 1st | Jonsson / Mogren / Håland |
| 12 | 1994–95 | 18 December 1994 | Sappada, Italy | 4 × 10 km Relay F | World Cup | 3rd | Göransson / Mogren / Forsberg |
| 13 | 1994–95 | 18 January 1995 | Nové Město, Czech Republic | 4 × 10 km Relay C | World Cup | 2nd | Fredriksson / Jonsson / Forsberg |
