= Magnus Ingesson =

Swedish cross country skier

Personal information
- Full name: Bengt Magnus Ingesson
- Nationality: Sweden
- Born: February 18, 1971 (age 55) Luleå, Sweden

Sport
- Sport: Skiing
- Club: Piteå Elit

World Cup career
- Seasons: 10 – (1994, 1996–2004)
- Indiv. starts: 59
- Indiv. podiums: 0
- Team starts: 15
- Team podiums: 2
- Team wins: 1
- Overall titles: 0 – (42nd in 2000)
- Discipline titles: 0
Medal record
Men's cross-country skiing
Representing Sweden
World Championships
Silver medal – second place	2001 Lahti	4 × 10 km relay
- Updated on 3 April 2019

Magnus Ingesson, born February 18, 1971, in Luleå, Sweden, is a Swedish former cross-country skier who competed from 1993 to 2004. He earned a silver medal in the 4 × 10 km relay at the 2001 FIS Nordic World Ski Championships in Lahti, and had his best individual finish of ninth in the 15 km event at those same championships.

Ingesson's best individual finish at the Winter Olympics was eight in the 15 km event at Salt Lake City in 2002. His best individual career finish was second in four races up to 15 km from 1996 to 2000.

After retiring from competition in 2004, Ingesson became a police officer with the Swedish Police Authority, working as a detective in Piteå. From 2008 to 2010 he was co-head coach of the cross-country section of Ski Team Sweden together with Joakim Abrahamsson. He rejoined the Police Authority in 2010, while serving as the personal coach of Charlotte Kalla. He has been coaching Kalla full time since 2013, taking an unpaid leave of absence from the Police Authority, but receiving a salary through LKAB, one of Kalla's personal sponsors.

Since 12 April 2018, Ingesson once again is the coach for Team Sweden in women's cross-country skiing. In May 2018, it was announced he would share this leadership together with Annika Zell.

== Cross-country skiing results ==
All results are sourced from the International Ski Federation (FIS).

=== Olympic Games ===
Year	Age	15 km	Pursuit	30 km	50 km	Sprint	4 × 10 km relay
2002	31	8	—	—	16	—	—

=== World Championships ===
- 1 medal – (1 silver)

Year	Age	15 km	Pursuit	30 km	50 km	Sprint	4 × 10 km relay
2001	30	9	31	—	42	—	Silver
2003	32	47	31	—	—	—	—

=== World Cup ===
==== Season standings ====
Season	Age					
Season	Age	Overall	Distance	Long Distance	Middle Distance	Sprint
1994	23	NC	—N/a	—N/a	—N/a	—N/a
1996	25	67	—N/a	—N/a	—N/a	—N/a
1997	26	89	—N/a	51	—N/a	—
1998	27	51	—N/a	54	—N/a	50
1999	28	44	—N/a	53	—N/a	45
2000	29	42	—N/a	50	25	NC
2001	30	45	—N/a	—N/a	—N/a	—
2002	31	131	—N/a	—N/a	—N/a	—
2003	32	53	—N/a	—N/a	—N/a	—
2004	33	NC	NC	—N/a	—N/a	—

==== Team podiums ====
- 2 victory – (1 RL)
- 2 podiums – (1 RL, 1 TS)

No.	Season	Date	Location	Race	Level	Place	Teammate(s)
1	1996–97	19 January 1997	Lahti, Finland	12 × 1.5 km Team Sprint F	World Cup	3rd	Nordbäck
2	1998–99	29 November 1998	Muonio, Finland	4 × 10 km Relay F	World Cup	1st	Bergström / Fredriksson / Elofsson
