= Urban Lindgren =

Swedish cross-country skier (born 1973)

Personal information
- Full name: Erik Urban Lindgren
- Nationality: Sweden
- Born: 18 April 1973 (age 53) Morjärv, Sweden

Sport
- Sport: Skiing
- Club: Piteå Elit

World Cup career
- Seasons: 8 – (1995–2002)
- Indiv. starts: 29
- Indiv. podiums: 0
- Team starts: 10
- Team podiums: 4
- Team wins: 1
- Overall titles: 0 – (35th in 2000)
- Discipline titles: 0
Medal record
Men's cross-country skiing
Representing Sweden
World Championships
Silver medal – second place	2001 Lahti	4 × 10 km relay

Urban Lindgren (born 18 April 1973 in Morjärv, Norrbotten) is a Swedish cross-country skier who competed from 1993 to 2002. He earned a silver medal in the 4 × 10 km relay at the 2001 FIS Nordic World Ski Championships in Lahti, and finished 14th in the 30 km event at those same championships.

Lindgren's best individual finish at the Winter Olympics was 17th in the 15 km event at Salt Lake City in 2002. He also won four races up to 15 km in his career from 1998 to 2000.

== Cross-country skiing results ==
All results are sourced from the International Ski Federation (FIS).

=== Olympic Games ===
Year	Age	15 km	Pursuit	30 km	50 km	Sprint	4 × 10 km relay
2002	28	17	—	—	—	—	13

=== World Championships ===
- 1 medal – (1 silver)

Year	Age	15 km	Pursuit	30 km	50 km	Sprint	4 × 10 km relay
2001	27	25	—	14	—	—	Silver

=== World Cup ===
==== Season standings ====
Season	Age					
Season	Age	Overall	Distance	Long Distance	Middle Distance	Sprint
1995	21	NC	—N/a	—N/a	—N/a	—N/a
1996	22	NC	—N/a	—N/a	—N/a	—N/a
1997	23	NC	—N/a	NC	—N/a	—
1998	24	NC	—N/a	NC	—N/a	—
1999	25	63	—N/a	38	—N/a	—
2000	26	35	—N/a	20	49	19
2001	27	58	—N/a	—N/a	—N/a	77
2002	28	89	—N/a	—N/a	—N/a	—

==== Team podiums ====
- 1 victory – (1 RL)
- 4 podiums – (3 RL)

No.	Season	Date	Location	Race	Level	Place	Teammates
1	1999–00	19 December 1999	Davos, Switzerland	4 × 10 km Relay C	World Cup	2nd	Nordbäck / Jonsson / Fredriksson
2	2000–01	18 March 2001	Falun, Sweden	4 × 10 km Relay C/F	World Cup	2nd	Fredriksson / Göransson / Elofsson
3	2001–02	27 November 2001	Kuopio, Finland	4 × 10 km Relay C/F	World Cup	2nd	Fredriksson / Elofsson / Brink
4	2001–02	16 December 2001	Davos, Switzerland	4 × 10 km Relay C/F	World Cup	1st	Fredriksson / Jonsson / Elofsson
