= Per Elofsson =

Swedish cross-country skier

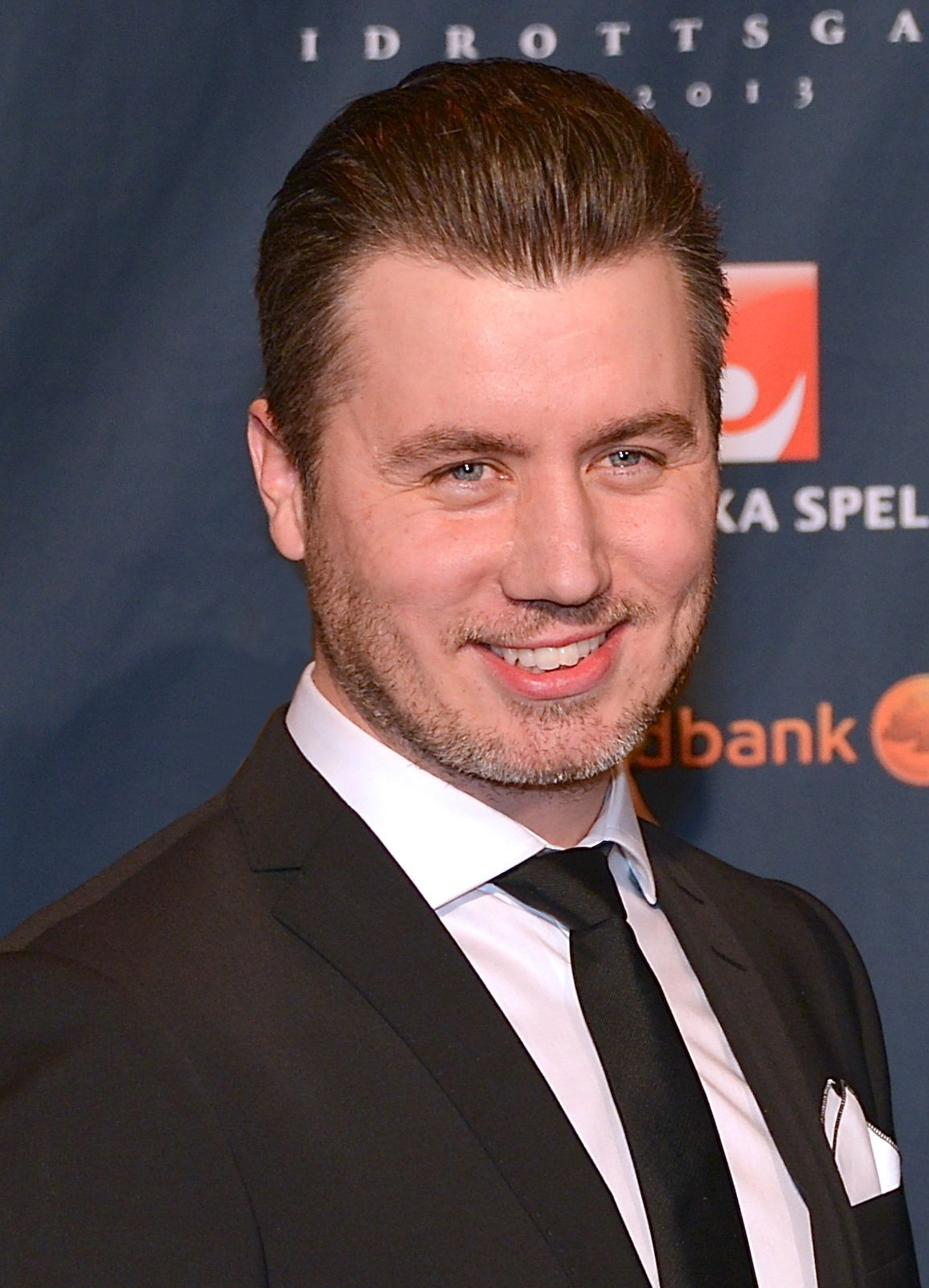
- Per Elofsson at the Swedish Sports Awards inside the Stockholm Globe Arena in Stockholm, Sweden in January 2013

Personal information
- Full name: Per Eilert Elofsson
- Nationality: Sweden
- Born: 2 April 1977 (age 49) Röbäck, Sweden

Sport
- Sport: Skiing
- Club: IFK Umeå

World Cup career
- Seasons: 8 – (1997–2004)
- Indiv. starts: 65
- Indiv. podiums: 23
- Indiv. wins: 11
- Team starts: 17
- Team podiums: 10
- Team wins: 4
- Overall titles: 2 – (2001, 2002)
- Discipline titles: 0
Medal record
Men's cross-country skiing
Representing Sweden
International nordic ski competitions
Event	1st	2nd	3rd
Olympic Games	0	0	1
World Championships	3	1	1
Total	3	1	2
Olympic Games
Bronze medal – third place	2002 Salt Lake City	20 km combined pursuit
World Championships
Gold medal – first place	2001 Lahti	15 km classical
Gold medal – first place	2001 Lahti	10 km + 10 km combined pursuit
Gold medal – first place	2003 Val di Fiemme	10 km + 10 km double pursuit
Silver medal – second place	2001 Lahti	4 × 10 km relay
Bronze medal – third place	2003 Val di Fiemme	4 × 10 km relay
Junior World Championships
Gold medal – first place	1996 Asiago	10 km classical
Gold medal – first place	1997 Canmore	30 km freestyle
Silver medal – second place	1996 Asiago	30 km freestyle
Bronze medal – third place	1996 Asiago	4 × 10 km relay

Per Eilert Elofsson (born 2 April 1977 in Röbäck, Västerbotten) is a Swedish former cross-country skier who competed from 1997 to 2004. He won a bronze medal in the 10 km + 10 km combined pursuit at the 2002 Winter Olympics in Salt Lake City, being upgraded from fourth place in 2004, after Spain's Johann Mühlegg got stripped of his gold medal due to the use of darboepotine.

Elofsson also won five medals at the FIS Nordic World Ski Championships with three golds (2001: 15 km, 10 km + 10 km combined pursuit; 2003: 10 km + 10 km double pursuit), one silver (2001: 4 × 10 km relay), and one bronze (2003: 4 × 10 km relay).

He also won the 50 km event at the Holmenkollen ski festival in 2001. This success along with his two golds earned at the 2001 FIS Nordic World Ski Championships in Lahti would give Elofsson the Svenska Dagbladet Gold Medal. At the 2002 Swedish Sports Award, he was awarded the prize for Sportsman of the Year.

In 2005 he made an unexpected appearance on the album Grand Illusion by the Heavy metal band Nocturnal Rites, playing guitar on one song.

He retired 26 October 2005 by giving a press conference at Arlanda airport.

== After retirement ==
In 2007, Elofsson started working as a business developer at Swedbank, giving financial advice to professional athletes. His first client was fellow cross-country skier Charlotte Kalla. He left Swedbank in April 2016.

Elofsson was a pundit and expert commentator for SVT Sport during cross-country championships. During the 2014 Winter Olympics he was employed by Swedish broadcaster Viasat. In November 2014 he left Viasat and joined Eurosport.

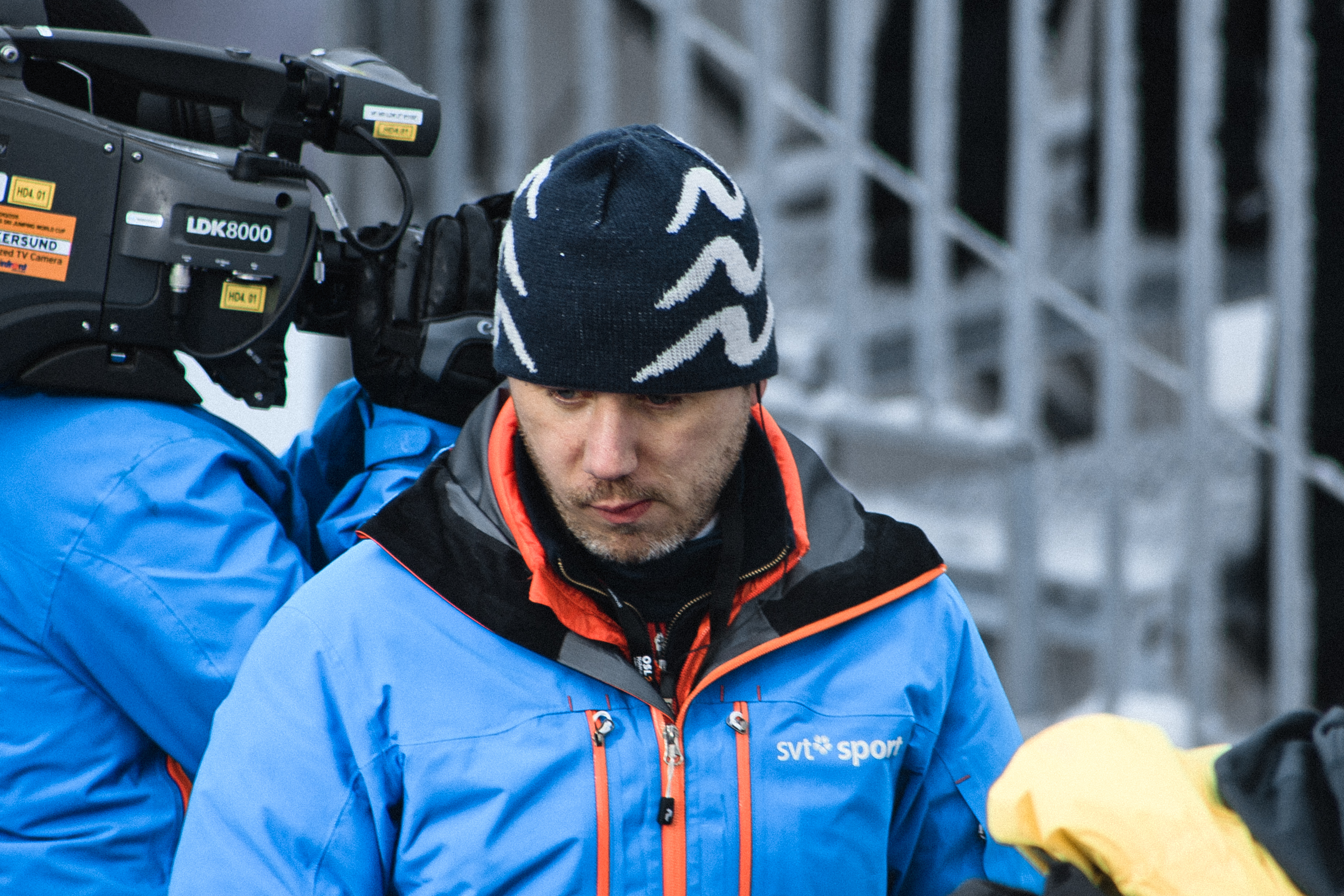
Elofsson as a pundit for SVT Sport in Oslo 2011

.

== Cross-country skiing results ==
All results are sourced from the International Ski Federation (FIS).

=== Olympic Games ===
- 1 medal – (1 bronze)

Year	Age	10 km	15 km	Pursuit	30 km	50 km	Sprint	4 × 10 km relay
1998	20	—	—N/a	—	10	—	—N/a	4
2002	24	—N/a	5	Bronze	DNF	17	—	—

=== World Championships ===
- 5 medals – (3 gold, 1 silver, 1 bronze)

Year	Age	10 km	15 km	Pursuit	30 km	50 km	Sprint	4 × 10 km relay
1999	21	22	—N/a	9	8	—	—N/a	6
2001	23	—N/a	Gold	Gold	—	6	—	Silver
2003	25	—N/a	12	Gold	—	21	—	Bronze

=== World Cup ===
==== Season titles ====
- 2 titles – (2 overall)

Season
Season	Discipline
2001	Overall
2002	Overall

==== Season standings ====
Season	Age					
Season	Age	Overall	Distance	Long Distance	Middle Distance	Sprint
1997	19	NC	—N/a	NC	—N/a	—
1998	20	19	—N/a	32	—N/a	10
1999	21	5	—N/a	8	—N/a	5
2000	22	4	—N/a	4	3rd place, bronze medalist(s)	51
2001	23	1st place, gold medalist(s)	—N/a	—N/a	—N/a	68
2002	24	1st place, gold medalist(s)	—N/a	—N/a	—N/a	63
2003	25	24	—N/a	—N/a	—N/a	—
2004	26	NC	NC	—N/a	—N/a	—

==== Individual podiums ====
- 11 victories – (11 WC)
- 23 podiums – (23 WC)

No.	Season	Date	Location	Place	Level	Place
1	1997–98	11 March 1998	Falun, Sweden	10 km Individual F	World Cup	3rd
2	1998–99	28 November 1998	Muonio, Finland	10 km Individual F	World Cup	1st
3	1998–99	12 January 1999	Nové Město, Czech Republic	30 km Individual F	World Cup	3rd
4	1999–00	2 February 2000	Trondheim, Norway	10 km Individual F	World Cup	2nd
5	1999–00	16 February 2000	Ulrichen, Switzerland	10 km Individual F	World Cup	2nd
6	1999–00	20 February 2000	La Transjurassienne, France	72 km Mass Start F	World Cup	2nd
7	1999–00	19 March 2000	Bormio, Italy	15 km Pursuit F	World Cup	3rd
8	2000–01	29 November 2000	Beitostølen, Norway	10 km Individual F	World Cup	1st
9	2000–01	8 December 2000	Santa Caterina, Italy	15 km Individual F	World Cup	1st
10	2000–01	16 December 2000	Brusson, Italy	10 km + 10 km Pursuit C/F	World Cup	1st
11	2000–01	10 February 2001	Otepää, Estonia	10 km Individual C	World Cup	2nd
12	2000–01	4 March 2001	Kavgolovo, Russia	15 km Individual F	World Cup	1st
13	2000–01	10 March 2001	Oslo, Norway	50 km Individual C	World Cup	1st
14	2000–01	14 March 2001	Borlänge, Sweden	10 km Individual F	World Cup	1st
15	2001–02	25 November 2001	Kuopio, Finland	10 km Individual F	World Cup	1st
16	2001–02	8 December 2001	Cogne, Italy	10 km Individual C	World Cup	2nd
17	2001–02	12 December 2001	Brusson, Italy	15 km Individual F	World Cup	3rd
18	2001–02	15 December 2001	Davos, Switzerland	15 km Individual C	World Cup	2nd
19	2001–02	22 December 2001	Ramsau, Austria	30 km Mass Start F	World Cup	1st
20	2001–02	5 January 2002	Val di Fiemme, Italy	10 km + 10 km Pursuit C/F	World Cup	1st
21	2001–02	3 February 2002	Lahti, Finland	15 km Individual F	World Cup	1st
22	2001–02	3 March 2002	Falun, Sweden	10 km + 10 km Pursuit C/F	World Cup	3rd
23	2002–03	18 January 2003	Nové Město, Czech Republic	15 km Individual F	World Cup	3rd

==== Team podiums ====
- 4 victories – (3 RL, 1 TS)
- 10 podiums – (9 RL, 1 TS)

No.	Season	Date	Location	Race	Level	Place	Teammate(s)
1	1997–98	7 December 1997	Santa Caterina, Italy	4 × 10 km Relay F	World Cup	3rd	Bergström / Mogren / Forsberg
2	1997–98	11 January 1998	Ramsau, Austria	4 × 10 km Relay C/F	World Cup	2nd	Fredriksson / Jonsson / Mogren
3	1997–98	10 March 1998	Falun, Sweden	10 × 1.6 km Team Sprint F	World Cup	1st	Fredriksson
4	1998–99	29 November 1998	Muonio, Finland	4 × 10 km Relay F	World Cup	1st	Bergström / Ingesson / Fredriksson
5	1998–99	19 December 1998	Davos, Switzerland	4 × 10 km Relay C/F	World Cup	2nd	Bergström / Jonsson / Fredriksson
6	1998–99	13 March 1999	Falun, Sweden	4 × 10 km Relay C/F	World Cup	1st	Fredriksson / Bergström / Brink
7	2000–01	18 March 2001	Falun, Sweden	4 × 10 km Relay C/F	World Cup	2nd	Lindgren / Fredriksson / Göransson
8	2001–02	27 November 2001	Kuopio, Finland	4 × 10 km Relay C/F	World Cup	2nd	Lindgren / Fredriksson / Brink
9	2001–02	16 December 2001	Davos, Switzerland	4 × 10 km Relay C/F	World Cup	1st	Lindgren / Fredriksson / Jonsson
10	2001–02	10 March 2002	Falun, Sweden	4 × 10 km Relay C/F	World Cup	2nd	Fredriksson / Södergren / Östberg

Awards
Preceded by Lars Frölander	Svenska Dagbladet Gold Medal; 2001	Succeeded by Susanne Ljungskog
