= Ramona Roth =

German cross-country skier (born 1977)

Personal information
- Nationality: Germany
- Born: 7 March 1977 (age 49)

Sport
- Sport: Skiing
- Club: TUS Erndtebrück

World Cup career
- Seasons: 6 – (1997–2002)
- Indiv. starts: 22
- Indiv. podiums: 0
- Team starts: 7
- Team podiums: 1
- Team wins: 0
- Overall titles: 0 – (60th in 2001)
- Discipline titles: 0
Medal record
Women's cross-country skiing
Representing Germany
World Championships
Bronze medal – third place	1999 Ramsau	4 × 5 km relay
Junior World Championships
Silver medal – second place	1996 Asiago	4 × 5 km relay

Ramona Roth (born 7 March 1977) is a German cross-country skier who competed from 1995 to 2002. She has won a bronze medal in the 4 × 5 km relay at the 1999 FIS Nordic World Ski Championships in Ramsau, and had her best finish of 18th in the 5 km event at the 1997 FIS Nordic World Ski Championships.

Roth has five individual career victories up to 10 km from 1996 to 2001.

== Cross-country skiing results ==
All results are sourced from the International Ski Federation (FIS).

=== World Championships ===
- 1 medal – (1 bronze)

Year	Age	5 km	10 km	15 km	Pursuit	30 km	Sprint	4 × 5 km relay
1997	20	18	—N/a	—	DNF	—	—N/a	—
1999	22	25	—N/a	—	36	—	—N/a	Bronze
2001	24	—N/a	48	—	—	CNX^{[a]}	—	—

a. ^{1} Cancelled due to extremely cold weather.

=== World Cup ===
==== Season standings ====
Season	Age				
Season	Age	Overall	Long Distance	Middle Distance	Sprint
1997	20	61	45	—N/a	—
1998	21	NC	NC	—N/a	—
1999	22	74	NC	—N/a	50
2000	23	83	—	NC	58
2001	24	60	—N/a	—N/a	35
2002	25	NC	—N/a	—N/a	—

==== Team podiums ====
- 1 podium

No.	Season	Date	Location	Race	Level	Place	Teammate(s)
1	1998–99	26 February 1999	Ramsau, Austria	4 × 5 km Relay C/F	World Championships^{[a]}	3rd	Bauer / Sachenbacher / Wille

a. ^{1} 1999 World Championship races are included in the 1998–99 World Cup scoring system.
