= The 8th Sin =

Studio album by Nocturnal Rites
- Released: 5 June 2007
- Studios: Toontrack (Umeå, Sweden)
- Genre: Power metal
- Length: 41:42
- Label: Century Media
- Producers: Nocturnal Rites, Shep

Nocturnal Rites chronology
Grand Illusion (2006)	The 8th Sin (2007)

The 8th Sin is the eighth studio album by Swedish power metal band Nocturnal Rites, released by Century Media on 5 June 2007.

== Track listing ==
All songs by Mannberg/Eriksson/Norberg.

1. "Call Out to the World" – 3:48
2. "Never Again" – 3:19
3. "Not the Only" – 5:16
4. "Tell Me" – 4:13
5. "Not Like You" – 4:25
6. "Leave Me Alone" – 3:00
7. "Till I Come Alive" – 3:45
8. "Strong Enough" – 3:13
9. "Me" – 4:13
10. "Pain & Pleasure" – 3:53
11. "Fools Parade (Outro)" – 2:37

== Personnel ==
- Jonny Lindkvist – vocals
- Fredrik Mannberg – guitar
- Nils Norberg – lead guitar
- Nils Eriksson – bass
- Owe Lingvall – drums

Guests and additional personnel

- Carolina Miskovsky – guest vocals on track 9
- Henrik Kjellberg – backing vocals, keyboard arrangements, orchestrations, background vocal arrangements
- Samuel Ljungblad – backing vocals
- Richard Frohm – piano on track 9
- Olec Batla – narration, percussion, salt marimba
- Jens Kidman – harsh vocals on track 10
