= The Sacred Talisman =

Studio album by Nocturnal Rites
- Released: 11 May 1999
- Recorded: November–December 1998
- Genre: Power metal
- Length: 43:09
- Label: Century Media

Nocturnal Rites chronology
Tales of Mystery and Imagination (1998)	The Sacred Talisman (1999)	Afterlife (2000)

Professional ratings
Review scores
Source	Rating
AllMusic	3/5 stars

The Sacred Talisman is the third album by Swedish power metal band Nocturnal Rites. Released in 1999, it is their second album on Century Media.

== Track listing ==
1. "Destiny Calls" – 3:58
2. "The Iron Force" – 4:20
3. "Ride On" – 3:16
4. "Free at Last" – 3:49
5. "Hold On to the Flame" – 4:08
6. "Eternity Holds" – 4:00
7. "When Fire Comes to Ice" – 3:48
8. "The Legend Lives On" – 5:57
9. "The King's Command" – 3:24
10. "Unholy Powers" – 3:12
11. "Glorious" – 3:23
12. "Journey Through Time" (Japanese version bonus track)

== Personnel ==
- Anders Zackrisson – vocals
- Fredrik Mannberg – guitar
- Nils Norberg – lead and rhythm guitar, synth guitar, spacelizer
- Nils Eriksson – bass
- Owe Lingvall – drums
- Mattias Bernhardsson – keyboards
