= Piteå Elit =

Cross-country skiing club in Piteå, Sweden

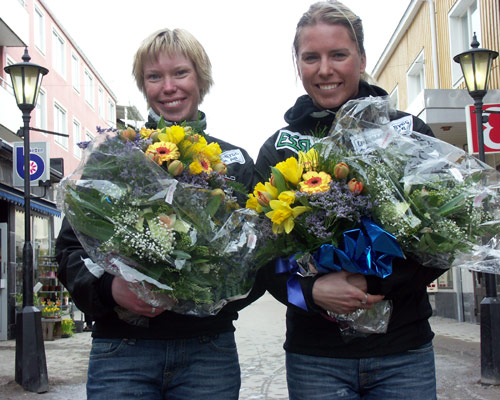
Lina Andersson (left) and Emelie Öhrstig celebrate in Piteå following the FIS Nordic World Ski Championships 2005.

Piteå Elit is a cross-country skiing club from Piteå in northern Sweden. In the 2011–12 season, three skiers represented Sweden internationally. The club also has many skiers now skiing on the national level.

The club had two skiers, Magdalena Pajala and Jesper Modin, competing in the 2010 Winter Olympics for Sweden. Former skier Magnus Ingesson from the club was the head coach for the Swedish cross-country skiing team in the 2010 Winter Olympics.

On May 6, 2012, Charlotte Kalla joined Piteå Elit, for which she would compete starting with the 2012/13 season.

== Current skiers ==
- Jonna Sundling
- Charlotte Kalla
- Mia Eriksson
- Magdalena Pajala
- Jennie Öberg
- Emma Sjölander
- Ebba Andersson
- Johan Westerlund
- Mikael Norberg
- Jesper Modin
- Karl Edenroth
- Mikael Norberg
- Martin Bergström

== Former skiers ==
- Lina Andersson MedalGold 2006 Turin cross-country skiing at the 2006 Winter Olympics Team sprint, MedalSilver 2005 Oberstdorf Individual sprint, MedalSilver 2009 Liberec cross-country skiing at the FIS Nordic World Ski Championships 2009 Team sprint, MedalBronze 2009 Liberec cross-country skiing at the 4 x 5 km.
- David Flinkfeldt
- Emma Lundbäck
- Susanne Nyström
- Karolina Skoog
- Kina Swidén
- Niklas Jonsson won the silver medal in the 50 km at the 1998 Winter Olympics in Nagano.
- Urban Lindgren earned a silver medal in the 4 x 10 km at the 2001 FIS Nordic World Ski Championships in Lahti.
- Magnus Ingesson earned a silver medal in the 4 x 10 km at the 2001 FIS Nordic World Ski Championships in Lahti.
- Emelie Öhrstig won gold medal in sprint at the 2005 FIS Nordic World Ski Championships in Oberstdorf.
- Larry Poromaa
- Lars Öberg
