= New World Messiah =

Studio album by Nocturnal Rites
- Released: 24 March 2004
- Studio: Toontrack (Umeå, Sweden)
- Genre: Power metal
- Length: 46:57
- Label: Century Media
- Producer: Shep, Nocturnal Rites

Nocturnal Rites chronology
Shadowland (2002)	New World Messiah (2004)	Grand Illusion (2006)

Professional ratings
Review scores
Source	Rating
AllMusic	2.5/5 stars

New World Messiah is the sixth studio album by Swedish power metal band Nocturnal Rites, released in 2004. The fifth track on the album, "Egyptica", was featured on the American reality TV series Viva La Bam.

== Track listing ==
1. "New World Messiah" – 4:08
2. "Against the World" – 4:19
3. "Avalon" – 4:20
4. "Awakening" – 5:28
5. "Egyptica" – 5:53
6. "Break Away" – 4:34
7. "End of Days" – 4:47
8. "The Flame Will Never Die" – 4:21
9. "One Nation" – 4:30
10. "Nightmare" – 4:37
11. "Another Storm" (bonus track) – 3:47

== Personnel ==
- Jonny Lindkvist – vocals
- Nils Norberg – lead and rhythm guitar
- Fredrik Mannberg – guitar
- Nils Eriksson – bass
- Owe Lingvall – drums
