= Magdalena Pajala =

Swedish cross-country skier

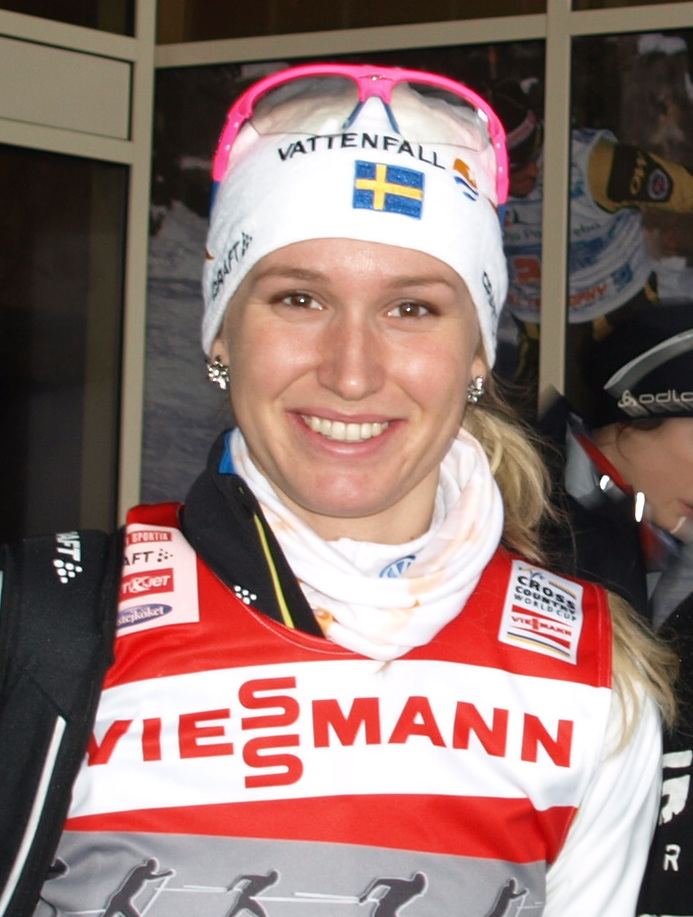
- Magdalena Pajala in February 2012

Personal information
- Full name: Emma Magdalena Sven-Eriksdotter Pajala
- Nationality: Sweden
- Born: 11 March 1988 Gällivare, Sweden

Sport
- Sport: Skiing
- Club: Piteå Elit

World Cup career
- Seasons: 8 – (2008–2015)
- Indiv. starts: 52
- Indiv. podiums: 0
- Team starts: 7
- Team podiums: 1
- Team wins: 0
- Overall titles: 0 – (35th in 2010)
- Discipline titles: 0

Emma Magdalena Sven-Eriksdotter Pajala (born 11 March 1988) is a Swedish female cross-country skier. She has competed in the World Cup since 2008. In January 2010, Pajala participated in the 2009-10 Tour de Ski and won the sprint event in the Swedish National Championship. In Tour de Ski, she finished ninth in the freestyle sprint and 10 km classical events, and ended up at 35th place in the overall rankings. At the 2010 Winter Olympics, Pajala finished fifth in the 4 × 5 km relay and tenth in the individual sprint event. Her best World Cup finish is fourth place at a sprint event in Drammen, Norway in March 2010.

== Cross-country skiing results ==
All results are sourced from the International Ski Federation (FIS).

=== Olympic Games ===
Year	Age	10 km individual	15 km skiathlon	30 km mass start	Sprint	4 × 5 km relay	Team sprint
2010	21	—	—	—	10	—	5

=== World Championships ===
Year	Age	10 km individual	15 km skiathlon	30 km mass start	Sprint	4 × 5 km relay	Team sprint
2013	24	—	—	—	28	—	—
2015	26	—	—	—	26	—	—

=== World Cup ===
==== Season standings ====
Season	Age	Discipline standings			Ski Tour standings		
Season	Age	Overall	Distance	Sprint	Nordic Opening	Tour de Ski	World Cup Final
2008	20	NC	—	NC	—N/a	—	—
2009	21	129	—	90	—N/a	—	—
2010	22	35	43	13	—N/a	35	35
2011	23	84	NC	58	—	—	—
2012	24	106	—	75	—	—	—
2013	25	45	NC	18	47	—	DNF
2014	26	76	NC	47	55	—	—
2015	27	65	—	35	—	—	—N/a

==== Team podiums ====
- 1 podium – (1 TS)

No.	Season	Date	Location	Race	Level	Place	Teammate
1	2012–13	13 January 2013	Liberec, Czech Republic	6 × 0.85 km Team Sprint F	World Cup	3rd	Sömskar
