= Jörgen Brink =

Swedish cross-country skier and biathlete

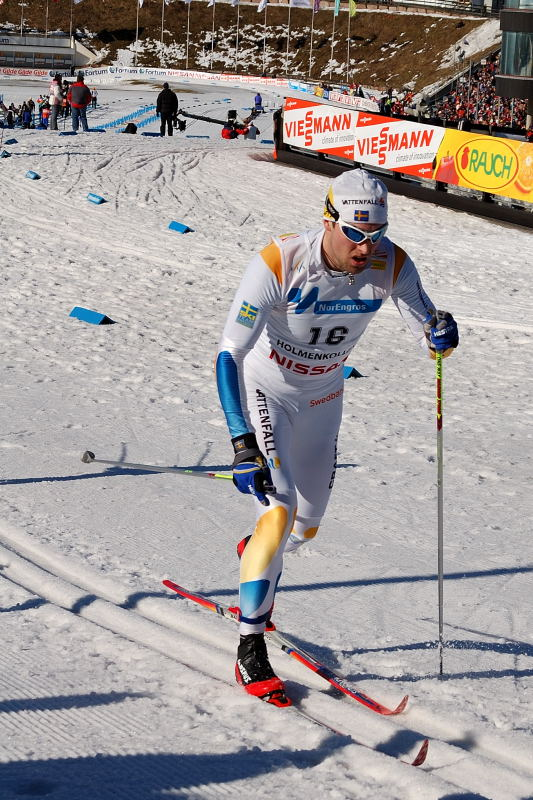
- Jörgen Brink in Holmenkollen, March 2007

Personal information
- Full name: Per Jörgen Brink
- Nationality: Sweden
- Born: 10 March 1974 (age 52) Delsbo, Hälsingland, Sweden

Sport
- Sport: Skiing
- Club: Delsbo IF

World Cup career
- Seasons: 14 – (1995–2007, 2011)
- Indiv. starts: 106
- Indiv. podiums: 5
- Indiv. wins: 1
- Team starts: 25
- Team podiums: 4
- Team wins: 2
- Overall titles: 0 – (3rd in 2003)
- Discipline titles: 0
Medal record
Men's cross-country skiing
Representing Sweden
World Championships
Bronze medal – third place	2003 Val di Fiemme	10 km + 10 km double pursuit
Bronze medal – third place	2003 Val di Fiemme	50 km freestyle
Bronze medal – third place	2003 Val di Fiemme	4 × 10 km relay
Junior World Championships
Bronze medal – third place	1994 Breitenwang	4 × 10 km relay

Jörgen Brink (born 10 March 1974 in Delsbo, Hälsingland) is a retired Swedish cross-country skier and biathlete who has competed since 1994. He earned three bronze medals at the 2003 FIS Nordic World Ski Championships in Val di Fiemme (10 km + 10 km double pursuit, 50 km, and 4 × 10 km relay).

Brink's best finish at the Winter Olympics was a 24th in the individual sprint in 2002. He won eleven FIS races from 1995 to 2006 at all distances. On 7 March 2010 he won the 90 km ski marathon race Vasaloppet, beating Daniel Tynell to the finishing line by a very narrow margin. Brink's winning time was 4 hours, 2 minutes and 59 seconds. On 6 March 2011 he won Vasaloppet again, beating Stanislav Řezáč by one second. His winning time was 3 hours, 51 minutes and 51 seconds. In 2012, he set a new Vasaloppet record by 16 seconds, winning at 3 hours, 38 minutes and 41 seconds. It was his third consecutive Vasaloppet win.

On 18 April 2019, he announced his retirement from cross-country skiing.

== Cross-country skiing results ==
All results are sourced from the International Ski Federation (FIS).

=== Olympic Games ===
Year	Age	15 km	Pursuit	30 km	50 km	Sprint	4 × 10 km relay	Team sprint
2002	28	—	—	—	—	24	—	—N/a
2006	32	—	30	—N/a	51	—	—	—

=== World Championships ===
- 3 medals – (3 bronze)

Year	Age	15 km	Pursuit	30 km	50 km	Sprint	4 × 10 km relay	Team sprint
2001	27	—	—	—	—	19	—	—N/a
2003	29	—	Bronze	—	Bronze	—	Bronze	—N/a
2005	31	—	52	—N/a	—	27	—	—

=== World Cup ===
==== Season standings ====
Season	Age	Discipline standings					Ski Tour standings		
Season	Age	Overall	Distance	Long Distance	Middle Distance	Sprint	Nordic Opening	Tour de Ski	World Cup Final
1995	21	NC	—N/a	—N/a	—N/a	—N/a	—N/a	—N/a	—N/a
1996	22	NC	—N/a	—N/a	—N/a	—N/a	—N/a	—N/a	—N/a
1997	23	NC	—N/a	NC	—N/a	—	—N/a	—N/a	—N/a
1998	24	NC	—N/a	NC	—N/a	—	—N/a	—N/a	—N/a
1999	25	86	—N/a	53	—N/a	—	—N/a	—N/a	—N/a
2000	26	62	—N/a	39	NC	38	—N/a	—N/a	—N/a
2001	27	NC	—N/a	—N/a	—N/a	—	—N/a	—N/a	—N/a
2002	28	16	—N/a	—N/a	—N/a	8	—N/a	—N/a	—N/a
2003	29	3rd place, bronze medalist(s)	—N/a	—N/a	—N/a	4	—N/a	—N/a	—N/a
2004	30	22	46	—N/a	—N/a	8	—N/a	—N/a	—N/a
2005	31	30	NC	—N/a	—N/a	13	—N/a	—N/a	—N/a
2006	32	58	52	—N/a	—N/a	41	—N/a	—N/a	—N/a
2007	33	NC	NC	—N/a	—N/a	NC	—N/a	45	—N/a
2011	37	NC	NC	—N/a	—N/a	—	—	—	—

==== Individual podiums ====
- 1 victory
- 5 podiums

No.	Season	Date	Location	Race	Level	Place
1	2001–02	13 March 2002	Oslo, Norway	1.5 km Sprint C	World Cup	2nd
2	2002–03	12 January 2003	Otepää, Estonia	30 km Mass Start C	World Cup	1st
3	2002–03	12 February 2003	Reit im Winkl, Germany	1.5 km Sprint F	World Cup	2nd
4	2002–03	22 March 2003	Falun, Sweden	10 km + 10 km Pursuit C/F	World Cup	3rd
5	2003–04	5 March 2004	Lahti, Finland	1.0 km Sprint F	World Cup	2rd

==== Team podiums ====
- 2 victories
- 4 podiums

No.	Season	Date	Location	Race	Level	Place	Teammates
1	1998–99	29 November 1998	Falun, Sweden	4 × 10 km Relay C/F	World Cup	1st	Fredriksson / Bergström / Elofsson
2	2001–02	27 November 2001	Kuopio, Finland	4 × 10 km Relay C/F	World Cup	2nd	Lindgren / Fredriksson / Elofsson
3	2002–03	23 March 2003	Falun, Sweden	4 × 10 km Relay C/F	World Cup	1st	Carlsson / Fredriksson / Södergren
4	2003–04	22 February 2004	Umeå, Sweden	4 × 10 km Relay C/F	World Cup	3rd	Larsson / Högberg / Fredriksson
