= Anders Bergström (cross-country skier) =

Swedish cross-country skier

Personal information
- Full name: Lars Anders Bergström
- Nationality: Sweden
- Born: September 4, 1968 (age 57) Los, Sweden

Sport
- Sport: Skiing
- Club: Svenska Skidspelen SK

World Cup career
- Seasons: 9 – (1989, 1992–1999)
- Indiv. starts: 73
- Indiv. podiums: 2
- Indiv. wins: 1
- Team starts: 24
- Team podiums: 11
- Team wins: 4
- Overall titles: 0 – (6th in 1999)
- Discipline titles: 0
Medal record
Men's cross-country skiing
Representing Sweden
Junior World Championships
Silver medal – second place	1987 Asiago	3 × 10 km relay
Bronze medal – third place	1988 Saafelden	3 × 10 km relay
- Updated on 3 April 2019

Anders Bergström (born 4 September 1968 in Los, Hälsingland) is a Swedish cross-country skier who competed from 1989 to 2003. Competing in two Winter Olympics, his best career finish was sixth in the 4 × 10 km relay at Lillehammer in 1994 while his best individual finish was 22nd in the 30 km event at the same olympics.

Bergström's best finish at the FIS Nordic World Ski Championships was sixth twice in the 30 km event (1997, 1999). His only World Cup victory was in a 30 km event in Sweden in 1999.

== Cross-country skiing results ==
All results are sourced from the International Ski Federation (FIS).

=== Olympic Games ===
Year	Age	10 km	Pursuit	30 km	50 km	4 × 10 km relay
1994	25	—	—	22	—	6
1998	29	—	—	23	—	—

=== World Championships ===
Year	Age	10 km	Pursuit	30 km	50 km	4 × 10 km relay
1995	26	17	9	13	8	4
1997	28	15	7	9	6	5
1999	30	23	DNF	6	9	6

=== World Cup ===
==== Season standings ====
Season	Age			
Season	Age	Overall	Long Distance	Sprint
1989	20	50	—N/a	—N/a
1992	23	47	—N/a	—N/a
1993	24	96	—N/a	—N/a
1994	25	20	—N/a	—N/a
1995	26	24	—N/a	—N/a
1996	27	13	—N/a	—N/a
1997	28	12	14	12
1998	29	31	29	31
1999	30	6	4	13

==== Individual podiums ====
- 1 victory
- 4 podiums

No.	Season	Date	Location	Race	Level	Place
1	1993–94	13 March 1994	Falun, Sweden	15 km Individual F	World Cup	3rd
2	1995–96	16 March 1996	Oslo, Norway	50 km Individual C	World Cup	3rd
3	1998–99	5 January 1999	Otepää, Estonia	15 km Individual C	World Cup	3rd
4	1998–99	14 March 1999	Falun, Sweden	30 km Individual C	World Cup	1st

==== Team podiums ====
- 2 victories
- 11 podiums

No.	Season	Date	Location	Race	Level	Place	Teammates
1	1993–94	13 March 1994	Falun, Sweden	4 × 10 km Relay F	World Cup	3rd	Mogren / Håland / Forsberg
2	1994–95	5 February 1995	Falun, Sweden	4 × 10 km Relay F	World Cup	3rd	Fredriksson / Håland / Forsberg
3	1995–96	10 December 1995	Davos, Switzerland	4 × 10 km Relay C	World Cup	3rd	Göransson / Jonsson / Mogren
4	1995–96	26 February 1996	Trondheim, Norway	4 × 10 km Relay C/F	World Cup	3rd	Fredriksson / Jonsson / Mogren
5	1996–97	8 December 1996	Davos, Switzerland	4 × 10 km Relay C	World Cup	2nd	Fredriksson / Jonsson / Forsberg
6	1996–97	15 December 1996	Brusson, Italy	4 × 10 km Relay F	World Cup	3rd	Fredriksson / Jonsson / Mogren
7	1996–97	9 March 1997	Falun, Sweden	4 × 10 km Relay C/F	World Cup	3rd	Fredriksson / Forsberg / Mogren
8	1997–98	7 December 1997	Santa Caterina, Italy	4 × 10 km Relay F	World Cup	3rd	Elofsson / Mogren / Forsberg
9	1998–99	29 November 1998	Muonio, Finland	4 × 10 km Relay F	World Cup	1st	Ingesson / Fredriksson / Elofsson
10	1998–99	20 December 1998	Davos, Switzerland	4 × 10 km Relay C/F	World Cup	2nd	Jonsson / Fredriksson / Elofsson
11	1998–99	14 March 1999	Falun, Sweden	4 × 10 km Relay C/F	World Cup	1st	Fredriksson / Elofsson / Brink
