= Grand Illusion (album) =

Studio album by Nocturnal Rites
- Released: 24 January 2006
- Recorded: May–June 2005
- Studios: Toontrack (Umeå, Sweden)
- Genre: Power metal
- Length: 46:38
- Label: Century Media
- Producer: Shep

Nocturnal Rites chronology
New World Messiah (2004)	Grand Illusion (2006)	The 8th Sin (2007)

Professional ratings
Review scores
Source	Rating
AllMusic	3/5 stars

Grand Illusion is the seventh studio album by Swedish power metal band Nocturnal Rites, released in 2006. It was also issued in a limited edition with a bonus DVD. The lyrical themes on the album focus on achieving freedom and overcoming tyranny.

== Track listing ==
1. "Fools Never Die" – 3:54
2. "Never Trust" – 4:43
3. "Still Alive" – 4:02
4. "Something Undefined" – 4:08
5. "Our Wasted Days" – 5:17
6. "Cuts Like a Knife" – 5:10
7. "End of Our Rope" – 5:26
8. "Never Ending" – 4:29
9. "One by One" – 4:23
10. "Deliverance" – 5:00

Japanese edition bonus tracks

1. "Fade Away"
2. "Under the Ice"

Bonus DVD listing

- Documentary
- "Fools Never Die" video
- "Avalon" video
- "Against the World" video
- "Awakening" video

== Personnel ==
Nocturnal Rites

- Jonny Lindkvist – vocals
- Fredrik Mannberg – rhythm guitar, backing vocals
- Nils Norberg – lead guitar
- Nils Eriksson – bass
- Owe Lingvall – drums

Additional personnel

- Henrik Kjellberg – keyboards and backing vocals
- Leif Grabbe – backing vocals
- Ronny Hemlin – backing vocals
- L-G Persson – backing vocals
- Jens Carlsson – backing vocals
- Jens Johansson – keyboard solo on "Cuts Like a Knife"
- Henrik Danhage (Evergrey) – first guitar solo on "Cuts Like a Knife"
- Kristoffer Olivius (Naglfar) – harsh vocals on "Cuts Like a Knife"
- Stefan Elmgren – second guitar solo on "Never Trust"
- Per Elofsson – "pre-chorus whammy bar chaos" on "Never Trust"
- Olec Balta – first guitar solo on "Something Undefined", left channel intro for "Our Wasted Days"
- Emil Norberg (Persuader) – "pre-chorus whammy bar madness and end of song lead frenzy" on "Our Wasted Days"

Production

- Shep – producer, recording, mixing
- Henrik Kjellberg – recording
- Mattias Eklund – engineer
- Fredrik Mannberg – engineer
- Pelle Henricsson – mastering
