= Afterlife (Nocturnal Rites album) =

Studio album by Nocturnal Rites
- Released: 29 August 2000
- Recorded: Tonteknik Studio, Umeå, Sweden
- Genre: Power metal
- Length: 40:43
- Label: Century Media
- Producer: Eskil Lovstrom

Nocturnal Rites chronology
The Sacred Talisman (1999)	Afterlife (2000)	Shadowland (2002)

Professional ratings
Review scores
Source	Rating
AllMusic	3/5 stars

Afterlife is the fourth studio album by Swedish power metal band Nocturnal Rites, released in 2000.

== Track listing ==
All music and lyrics by Nocturnal Rites

1. "Afterlife" – 5:26
2. "Wake Up Dead" – 3:48
3. "The Sinner's Cross" – 3:47
4. "Hell and Back" – 3:39
5. "The Sign" – 3:50
6. "The Devil's Child" – 3:18
7. "Genetic Distortion Sequence" – 4:01
8. "Sacrifice" – 3:21
9. "Temple of the Dead" – 4:47
10. "Hellenium" – 4:46

== Personnel ==
- Jonny Lindkvist – vocals
- Nils Norberg – lead guitar, guitar synthesizer and effects
- Fredrik Mannberg – guitar
- Mattias Bernhardsson – keyboards
- Nils Eriksson – bass
- Owe Lingvall – drums
