= Sigrid Wille =

German cross-country skier (born 1969)

Personal information
- Nationality: Germany
- Born: 2 November 1969 (age 56) Wangen im Allgäu, West Germany

Sport
- Sport: Skiing
- Club: SV Maierhöfen-Grünenbach

World Cup career
- Seasons: 10 – (1990–1999)
- Indiv. starts: 46
- Indiv. podiums: 0
- Team starts: 10
- Team podiums: 1
- Team wins: 0
- Overall titles: 0 – (17th in 1991)
- Discipline titles: 0
Medal record
Women's cross-country skiing
Representing Germany
World Championships
Bronze medal – third place	1999 Ramsau	4 × 5 km relay

Sigrid Wille (born 2 November 1969 in Wangen im Allgäu, Baden-Württemberg) is a German cross-country skier who competed from 1991 to 1999. She has won a bronze medal in the 4 × 5 km relay at the 1999 FIS Nordic World Ski Championships in Ramsau, and had her best finish of 13th in the 30 km event at the 1995 FIS Nordic World Ski Championships.

Wille's best individual finish at the Winter Olympics was 28th in the 15 km event at Nagano in 1998. Her lone individual victory was in a 5 km event in Slovenia in 1993.

== Cross-country skiing results ==
All results are sourced from the International Ski Federation (FIS).

=== Olympic Games ===
Year	Age	5 km	15 km	Pursuit	30 km	4 × 5 km relay
1998	28	38	28	54	—	—

=== World Championships ===
- 1 medal – (1 bronze)

Year	Age	5 km	10 km	15 km	Pursuit	30 km	4 × 5 km relay
1991	21	43	23	—	—N/a	16	—
1993	23	DNS	—N/a	—	—	27	10
1995	25	47	—N/a	16	21	13	5
1999	29	—	—N/a	18	—	23	Bronze

=== World Cup ===
==== Season standings ====
Season	Age	Overall	Long Distance	Sprint
1990	20	NC	—N/a	—N/a
1991	21	17	—N/a	—N/a
1992	22	NC	—N/a	—N/a
1993	23	66	—N/a	—N/a
1994	24	NC	—N/a	—N/a
1995	25	24	—N/a	—N/a
1996	26	NC	—N/a	—N/a
1997	27	NC	NC	—
1998	28	44	33	57
1999	29	36	32	39

==== Team podiums ====
- 1 podium

No.	Season	Date	Location	Race	Level	Place	Teammate(s)
1	1998–99	26 February 1999	Ramsau, Austria	4 × 5 km Relay C/F	World Championships^{[a]}	3rd	Bauer / Roth / Sachenbacher

a. ^{1} 1999 World Championship races are included in the 1998–99 World Cup scoring system.
