= Nocturnal Rites =

Swedish power metal band

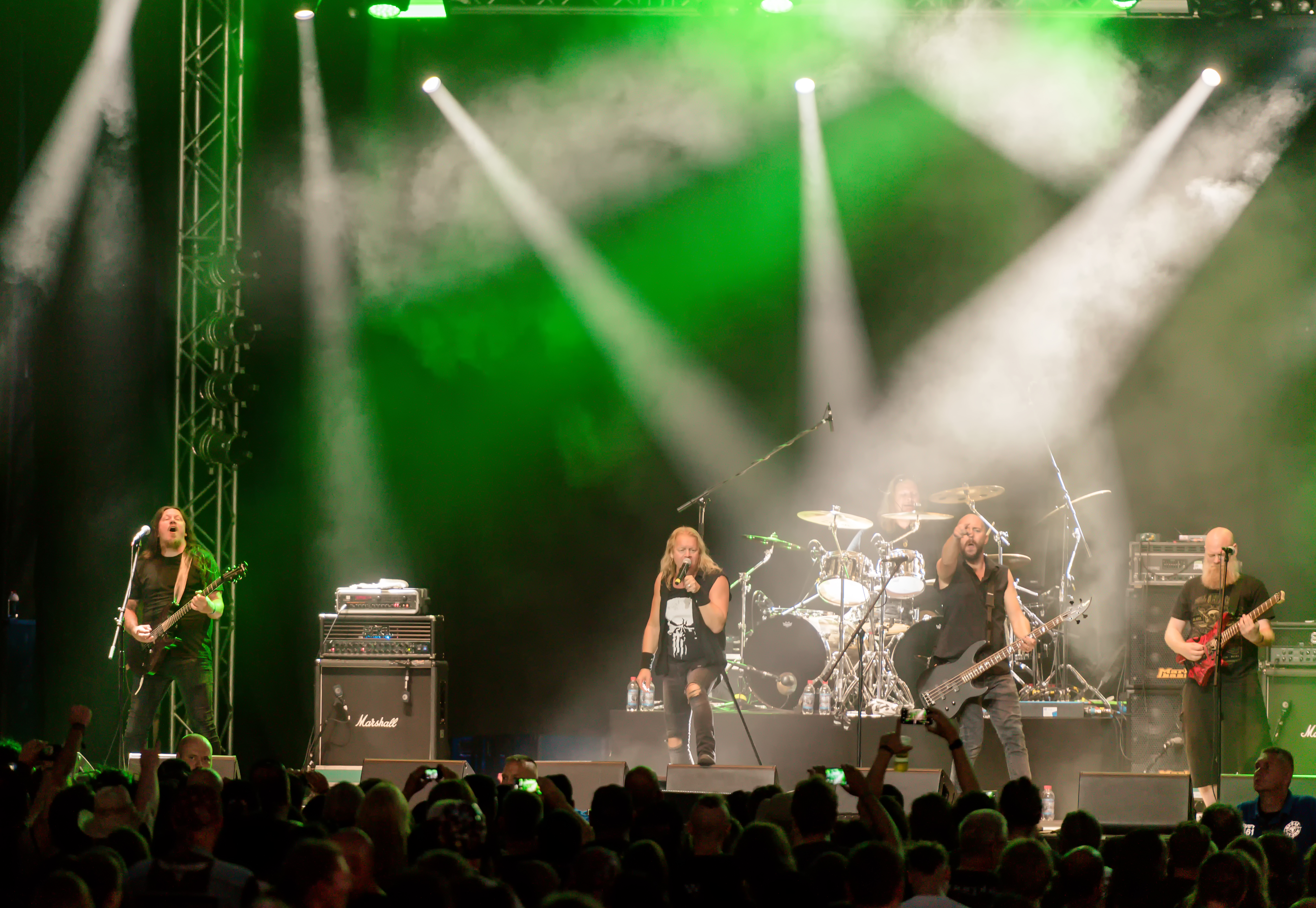
- Nocturnal Rites at Wacken Open Air 2018

Background information
- Origin: Umeå, Sweden
- Genres: Power metal
- Years active: 1990–present
- Labels: Century Media, AFM
- Members: Fredrik Mannberg; Nils Eriksson; Owe Lingvall; Jonny Lindqvist; Per Nilsson
- Past members: Anders Zackrisson; Mikael Söderström; Nils Norberg; Ulf Andersson; Mattias Bernhardsson; Tommy Eriksson
- Website: nocturnalrites.com

Nocturnal Rites is a Swedish power metal band formed in 1990. They have released nine studio albums.

== History ==
The band started off under the name Necronomic playing death metal, as can be heard on their demo (The Obscure, 1991). This attracted some independent labels' attention, but they turned them down in the hope of a better opportunity. On the two-track promo that was recorded in 1992, their style had evolved into a slightly more melodic, Iron Maiden-influenced sound.

The band initially consisted of Fredrik Mannberg (guitar and vocals) and Tommy Eriksson (drums), who then hired bassist Nils Eriksson. Following their change of style, the band hired vocalist Anders Zackrisson, whose voice was more adapted than Fredrik Mannberg's to power metal. Tommy Eriksson was soon after replaced by Ulf Andersson. The band also added a second guitarist, Mikael Söderström. By this time, they had fully evolved into the Helloween-style power metal sound of their first three albums.

In 1994, the band signed with Swedish label Dark Age, and the first album In a Time of Blood and Fire was released in collaboration with Megarock Records in 1995. After this, guitarist Mikael Söderström decided to leave the band and was replaced by Nils Norberg. Despite being a replacement for the band's rhythm guitarist, Norberg became their lead player, with Mannberg switching almost entirely to rhythm from then on. The second album, Tales of Mystery and Imagination, was first released in Japan in late 1997. It was released in United States in April 1998 on Century Media. The band toured Europe with Overkill and Angel Dust.

The third album, The Sacred Talisman was released in 1999 and featured a new drummer, Owe Lingvall due to a leg injury of Ulf Andersson. The album entered the Japanese charts at No. 83. Only 2 weeks after the release, the band toured Europe with Nevermore, Morgana Lefay and Sacred Steel and participated in Open air festivals such as 1999's Dynamo festival. After this, singer Anders Zackrisson was replaced by former Mogg frontman Jonny Lindqvist, a former bandmate of Owe Lingvall. His voice was quite different from his predecessor's, which gave the band a new face on their next album, Afterlife, released in 2000. The band then toured Europe once again with Iron Savior.

2004 saw the release of the album New World Messiah, followed by a six-week tour with Edguy and Brainstorm. Two videos were also released in December, Awakening and Against the World, both of them produced by drummer Owe Lingvall.

In 2005, the 10th anniversary was celebrated with the re-release of the two first albums and some bonus material on the Lost in Time double CD. The band also played a live show, Demons at the Opera with a 55-piece orchestra at the Umeå Opera House. A documentary about the show was broadcast on Swedish national television.

The album Grand Illusion, out in 2006, featured many special guests, including Jens Johansson (Stratovarius), Henrik Danhage (Evergrey), Kristoffer W. Olivius (Naglfar), Stefan Elmgren (HammerFall), and, more surprisingly, the Swedish world champion of cross-country skiing (three times world cup gold winner), Per Elofsson, who comes from the same town as the band, Umeå.

The band also toured with such acts as Nightwish, Gamma Ray, HammerFall and Labyrinth, and played in festivals such as Wacken Open Air, Sweden Rock, Gates of Metal, etc.

A new studio album, The 8th Sin, was released in 2007. Nils Norberg left the band the following year for personal reasons. He was replaced by Christoffer Rörland.

Mannberg and Erikson are also members of the thrash metal band Guillotine, and Rörland has joined Sabaton as of 2012.

On 29 September 2017, Nocturnal Rites released their first new album in 10 years titled Phoenix. The cover artwork was created by Claudio Bergamin.

== Band members ==
Current

- Fredrik Mannberg – guitars (1990–present), vocals (1990–1993)
- Nils Eriksson – bass (1990–present)
- Owe Lingvall – drums (1998–present)
- Jonny Lindqvist – vocals (2000–present)
- Per Nilsson – lead guitar (2017–present)

Former

- Tommy Eriksson – drums (1990–1992)
- Ulf Andersson – drums (1992–1998)
- Mikael Söderström – rhythm guitar (1992–1997)
- Anders Zackrisson – vocals (1993–2000)
- Mattias Bernhardsson – keyboards (1995–1998, session) (1999–2003)
- Nils Norberg – lead guitar (1997–2008)
- Christoffer Rörland – lead guitar (2008–2012)

== Discography ==
=== Studio albums ===
Title	Release date
In a Time of Blood and Fire	16 June 1995
Tales of Mystery and Imagination	21 April 1998
The Sacred Talisman	11 May 1999
Afterlife	29 August 2000
Shadowland	3 September 2002
New World Messiah	6 April 2004
Grand Illusion	24 January 2006
The 8th Sin	5 June 2007
Phoenix	29 September 2017

=== Music videos ===
- Eyes of the Dead (2002)
- Awakening (2004)
- Avalon (2004)
- Against the World (2004)
- Fools Never Die (2005)
- Still Alive (2005)
- Never Again (2007)
- A Heart as Black as Coal (2017)
- Repent My Sins (2017)
- The Ghost Inside Me (unreleased) (2017)
- Before We Waste Away (2019)

=== Other ===
- Lost in Time – The Early Years of Nocturnal Rites (best-of/compilation, 2005)
- Nocturnal Rites/Falconer (split album, 2005)
