= Shadowland (Nocturnal Rites album) =

Studio album by Nocturnal Rites
- Released: 27 May 2002
- Recorded: Dugout Studio, Uppsala, Sweden
- Genre: Power metal
- Length: 45:46
- Label: Century Media
- Producer: Daniel Bergstrand

Nocturnal Rites chronology
Afterlife (2000)	Shadowland (2002)	New World Messiah (2004)

Professional ratings
Review scores
Source	Rating
AllMusic	2/5 stars

Shadowland is the fifth studio album by Swedish power metal band Nocturnal Rites, released in 2002.

== Track listing ==
1. "Eyes of the Dead" – 4:53
2. "Shadowland" – 4:23
3. "Invincible" – 4:57
4. "Revelation" – 4:44
5. "Never Die" – 4:23
6. "Underworld" – 4:27
7. "Vengeance" – 5:19
8. "Faceless God" – 5:14
9. "Birth of Chaos" – 4:16
10. "The Watcher" – 4:00

== Personnel ==
- Jonny Lindkvist – vocals
- Nils Norberg – lead guitar, guitar synthesizer and effects
- Fredrik Mannberg – guitar
- Mattias Bernhardsson – keyboards
- Nils Eriksson – bass guitar
- Owe Lingvall – drums
