= In a Time of Blood and Fire =

Studio album by Nocturnal Rites
- Released: 1995
- Genre: Power metal
- Length: 43:27
- Label: Megarock

Nocturnal Rites chronology
In a Time of Blood and Fire (1995)	Tales of Mystery and Imagination (1997)

In a Time of Blood and Fire is the debut album by Swedish power metal band Nocturnal Rites, released in 1995.

In 2005, the album was re-issued as a two-disc compilation titled Lost in Time: The Early Years of Nocturnal Rites. It featured previously unreleased demos and acoustic re-recordings.

== Track listing ==
1. "Sword of Steel" – 3:21
2. "Skyline Flame" – 5:30
3. "Black Death" – 4:08
4. "In a Time of Blood and Fire" – 5:01
5. "Dawnspell" – 5:38
6. "Lay of Ennui" – 5:02
7. "Winds of Death" – 4:17
8. "Rest in Peace" – 3:37
9. "Dragonisle" – 6:53

2005 re-issue bonus tracks

1. "Lay of Ennui" (demo)
2. "In a Time of Blood and Fire (2004 Version)"
3. "Winds of Death (2004 Version)"

== Personnel ==
- Anders Zackrisson – vocals
- Fredrik Mannberg – lead guitar
- Mikael Söderström – rhythm guitar
- Nils Eriksson – bass
- Ulf Andersson – drums
- Mattias Bernhardsson – keyboards
