= Niklas Jonsson =

Swedish cross-country skier

Personal information
- Full name: Karl Niklas Jonsson
- Nationality: Sweden
- Born: 31 May 1969 (age 57) Piteå, Sweden

Sport
- Sport: Skiing
- Club: Piteå Elit

World Cup career
- Seasons: 13 – (1990–2002)
- Indiv. starts: 90
- Indiv. podiums: 4
- Indiv. wins: 0
- Team starts: 27
- Team podiums: 11
- Team wins: 2
- Overall titles: 0 – (11th in 1994)
- Discipline titles: 0
Medal record
Men's cross-country skiing
Representing Sweden
Olympic Games
Silver medal – second place	1998 Nagano	50 km freestyle
Junior World Championships
Silver medal – second place	1989 Vang	10 km
Bronze medal – third place	1988 Saalfelden	3 × 10 km relay

Niklas Jonsson (born 31 May 1969, in Piteå) is a Swedish cross-country skier who competed from 1990 to 2002. He won the silver medal in the 50 km at the 1998 Winter Olympics in Nagano. At that event, Jonsson started 30 seconds ahead of the gold medal favourite Bjørn Dæhlie. Soon Dæhlie caught up Jonsson, and they were skiing together for most of the distance. Shortly before the finish line, Jonsson escaped, but Dæhlie still finished 20 seconds behind, which was good enough for the gold medal. Jonsson finished second.

Jonsson's best finish at the FIS Nordic World Ski Championships was a fourth in the 50 km in 1999. His best finish was third in four different World Cup events from 1993 to 1999.

== Cross-country skiing results ==
All results are sourced from the International Ski Federation (FIS).

=== Olympic Games ===
- 1 medal – (1 silver)

Year	Age	10 km	15 km	Pursuit	30 km	50 km	Sprint	4 × 10 km relay
1992	22	5	—N/a	13	7	—	—N/a	—
1994	24	30	—N/a	DNS	—	27	—N/a	—
1998	28	25	—N/a	10	—	Silver	—N/a	4
2002	32	—N/a	—	28	36	DNS	—	13

=== World Championships ===
Year	Age	10 km	15 km	Pursuit	30 km	50 km	Sprint	4 × 10 km relay
1993	23	—	—N/a	—	30	—	—N/a	6
1995	25	14	—N/a	11	—	—	—N/a	4
1997	27	30	—N/a	23	—	—	—N/a	—
1999	29	31	—N/a	18	15	4	—N/a	6
2001	31	—N/a	—	—	DNS	—	—	—

=== World Cup ===
==== Season standings ====
Season	Age				
Season	Age	Overall	Long Distance	Middle Distance	Sprint
1990	20	40	—N/a	—N/a	—N/a
1991	21	30	—N/a	—N/a	—N/a
1992	22	12	—N/a	—N/a	—N/a
1993	23	28	—N/a	—N/a	—N/a
1994	24	11	—N/a	—N/a	—N/a
1995	25	18	—N/a	—N/a	—N/a
1996	26	16	—N/a	—N/a	—N/a
1997	27	24	30	—N/a	17
1998	28	28	19	—N/a	38
1999	29	14	9	—N/a	18
2000	30	27	10	22	—
2001	31	111	—N/a	—N/a	—
2002	32	95	—N/a	—N/a	—

==== Individual podiums ====
- 4 podiums – (4 WC)

No.	Season	Date	Location	Race	Level	Place
1	1993–94	11 December 1993	Santa Caterina, Italy	30 km Individual C	World Cup	3rd
2	1994–95	14 December 1994	Tauplitzalm, Austria	15 km Individual C	World Cup	3rd
3	1995–96	9 January 1996	Štrbské Pleso, Slovakia	50 km Individual F	World Cup	3rd
4	1999–00	18 December 1999	Davos, Switzerland	30 km Individual C	World Cup	3rd

==== Team podiums ====
- 2 victories – (2 RL)
- 11 podiums – (10 RL, 1 TS)

No.	Season	Date	Location	Race	Level	Place	Teammate(s)
1	1992–93	5 March 1993	Lahti, Finland	4 × 10 km Relay C	World Cup	1st	Majbäck / Mogren / Håland
2	1994–95	15 January 1995	Nové Město, Czech Republic	4 × 10 km Relay C	World Cup	2nd	Fredriksson / Majbäck / Forsberg
3	1994–95	12 February 1995	Oslo, Norway	4 × 5 km Relay C/F	World Cup	2nd	Fredriksson / Mogren / Forsberg
4	1995–96	10 December 1995	Davos, Switzerland	4 × 10 km Relay C	World Cup	3rd	Göransson / Bergström / Mogren
5	1995–96	2 February 1996	Seefeld, Austria	12 × 1.5 km Team Sprint F	World Cup	2nd	Mogren
6	1995–96	25 February 1996	Trondheim, Norway	4 × 10 km Relay C/F	World Cup	3rd	Fredriksson / Bergström / Mogren
7	1996–97	8 December 1996	Davos, Switzerland	4 × 10 km Relay C	World Cup	2nd	Fredriksson / Bergström / Forsberg
8	1996–97	15 December 1996	Brusson, Italy	4 × 10 km Relay F	World Cup	3rd	Fredriksson / Bergström / Mogren
9	1997–98	11 January 1998	Ramsau, Austria	4 × 10 km Relay C/F	World Cup	2nd	Fredriksson / Elofsson / Mogren
10	1999–00	19 December 1999	Davos, Switzerland	4 × 10 km Relay C	World Cup	2nd	Nordbäck / Fredriksson / Lindgren
11	2001–02	16 December 2001	Davos, Switzerland	4 × 10 km Relay C/F	World Cup	1st	Lindgren / Fredriksson / Elofsson
