= Skigo =

Swedish company

Skigo AB
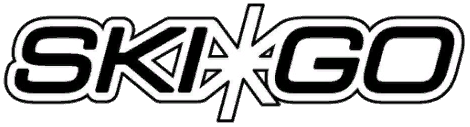
- Type: Private
- Industry: Chemical; Sports equipment
- Founded: 1979; 47 years ago
- Founder: Christer Majbäck
- Headquarters: Kiruna, Sweden
- Area served: Worldwide
- Key people: Kjell Häggroth (CEO)
- Products: Ski waxes, poles, sportswear
- Net income: ▼1,746 (2019)
- Total assets: ▼53,462 (2019)
- Website: skigo.se

Skigo AB is a Swedish manufacturing company of winter sports products, with its head office and production located in the city of Kiruna. Current range of products by Skigo includes ski waxes, poles and gloves. The company was founded by former cross-country skier Christer Majbäck and its products are distributed worldwide.

Skigo has had many firsts in the development of ski waxes, including the use of silicon, and was one of the early adopters of using PTFE in ski wax.

Skigo was started by Hagmans AB in 1979. In the early 1990s Skigo merged with the Lind-Ex brand. Both wax brands continued to be distributed separately until shortly after 1992 the decision was made to unify both brands under the Skigo name. The top waxes from each brand were retained under the unification. Skigo added ski poles and gloves to its product line in the early 2000s. Ski clothing began to be added in 2008 and roller skis in 2009. Research and development continues today in Kiruna with improvements and new waxes.

Skigo is official supplier to many National ski teams around the world including Sweden, Norway, Finland, Russia and Canada.

Many well-known Nordic skiers have been sponsored by and/or promoted Skigo waxes including Gunde Svan who appeared on the product packages in the 1980s and Christer Majbäck.
