= Tales of Mystery and Imagination (Nocturnal Rites album) =

Studio album by Nocturnal Rites
- Released: 18 December 1997
- Genre: Power metal
- Length: 52:14
- Label: Century Media

Nocturnal Rites chronology
| In a Time of Blood and Fire (1995) | Tales of Mystery and Imagination (1997) | The Sacred Talisman (1999) |

Professional ratings
Review scores
| Source | Rating |
|---|---|
| AllMusic | 2.5/5 stars |

Tales of Mystery and Imagination is the second album by Swedish power metal band Nocturnal Rites and their first on Century Media. It received distribution in Europe in February 1998 after being initially released only in Japan.

In 2005, the album was re-issued as a two-disc compilation titled Lost in Time: The Early Years of Nocturnal Rites. It featured previously unreleased demos and acoustic re-recordings.

== Track listing ==
1. "Ring of Steel" – 6:42
2. "Dark Secret" – 5:04
3. "Test of Time" – 5:01
4. "Lost in Time" – 3:01
5. "The Vision" – 4:21
6. "Warrior's Return" – 4:43
7. "Change the World" – 3:46
8. "Pentagram" – 3:48
9. "Eye of the Demon" – 4:42
10. "End of the World" – 3:24
11. "The Curse" – 4:03
12. "Burn in Hell" – 3:38
13. "Living for Today" (demo) – 4:36 (Japanese version bonus track)

2005 re-issue bonus tracks

1. "Living for Today" (demo)
2. 11 minutes "10th Anniversary" video enhancement

== Personnel ==
- Anders Zackrisson – vocals
- Fredrik Mannberg – guitar
- Nils Norberg – lead and rhythm guitar, synth guitar and spacelizer
- Nils Eriksson – bass
- Ulf Andersson – drums

Additional musicians

- Mattias Bernhardsson – keyboards
