= Mathias Fredriksson =

Swedish cross-country skier

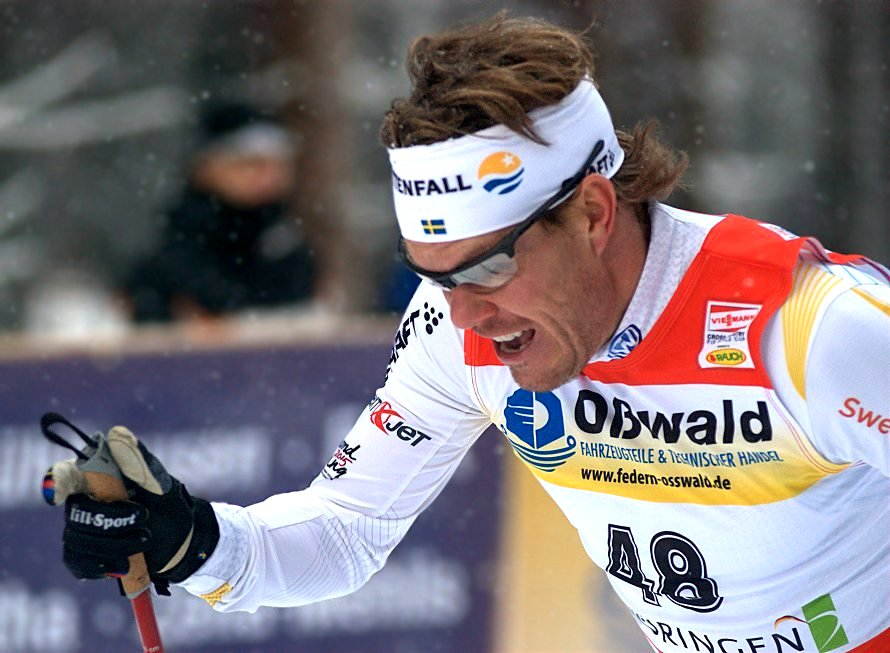
- Mathias Fredriksson during the Tour de Ski in January 2010

Personal information
- Full name: Johan Fredrik Mathias Fredriksson
- Nationality: Sweden
- Born: 11 February 1973 (age 53) Uddevalla, Sweden

Sport
- Sport: Skiing
- Club: AXA Sports Club

World Cup career
- Seasons: 17 – (1994–2011)
- Indiv. starts: 210
- Indiv. podiums: 15
- Indiv. wins: 9
- Team starts: 41
- Team podiums: 19
- Team wins: 5
- Overall titles: 1 – (2003)
- Discipline titles: 0
Medal record
Men's cross-country skiing
Representing Sweden
International nordic ski competitions
Event	1st	2nd	3rd
Olympic Games	0	0	1
World Championships	0	2	2
Total	0	2	3
Olympic Games
Bronze medal – third place	2006 Turin	4 × 10 km relay
World Championships
Silver medal – second place	2001 Lahti	15 km classical
Silver medal – second place	2001 Lahti	4 × 10 km relay
Bronze medal – third place	2003 Val di Fiemme	4 × 10 km relay
Bronze medal – third place	2007 Sapporo	4 × 10 km relay
Junior World Championships
Gold medal – first place	1992 Vuokatti	10 km classical
Gold medal – first place	1992 Vuokatti	30 km freestyle
Gold medal – first place	1992 Vuokatti	4 × 10 km relay
Gold medal – first place	1993 Harrachov	10 km classical
Silver medal – second place	1993 Harrachov	4 × 10 km relay
Bronze medal – third place	1993 Harrachov	30 km freestyle

Mathias Fredriksson (born 11 February 1973 in Uddevalla, Västra Götaland County) is a Swedish former cross-country skier who has competed since 1993. He earned a bronze medal in the 4 × 10 km relay at the 2006 Winter Olympics in Turin. Fredriksson's best individual Olympic finish was at these same Olympics with a tenth in the 50 km event.

Fredriksson has won four medals at the FIS Nordic World Ski Championships; two silvers (15 km and 4 × 10 km: both 2001) and two bronzes (4 × 10 km relay: 2003, 2007). He has 34 victories on the national, FIS, and World Cup levels at various distances since 1993. He won the World Cup in the 2002–03 season.

Fredriksson has a brother, Thobias Fredriksson, at the same professional level. He is married to Emma Helena Nilsson.

In October 2008 he was sentenced to sixteen days in prison for breaking the speed limit at Dovrefjell in June the same year. Fredriksson retired at the end of the 2012 season. His last competition was the Åre Cross Country Open on 14 April 2012.

In November 2013 he joined Sveriges Television as an expert commentator and studio analyst, covering the FIS Cross-Country World Cup and World Championships.

== Cross-country skiing results ==
All results are sourced from the International Ski Federation (FIS).

=== Olympic Games ===
- 1 medal – (1 bronze)

Year	Age	10 km	15 km	Pursuit	30 km	50 km	Sprint	4 × 10 km relay	Team sprint
1994	21	—	—N/a	—	23	DNS	—N/a	—	—N/a
1998	25	—	—N/a	—	—	20	—N/a	4	—N/a
2002	29	—N/a	—	27	—	29	—	13	—N/a
2006	33	—N/a	13	15	—N/a	10	—	Bronze	—

=== World Championships ===
- 4 medals – (2 silver, 2 bronze)

Year	Age	10 km	15 km	Pursuit	30 km	50 km	Sprint	4 × 10 km relay	Team sprint
1995	22	15	—N/a	21	16	15	—N/a	4	—N/a
1997	24	21	—N/a	17	7	7	—N/a	5	—N/a
1999	26	17	—N/a	16	11	12	—N/a	6	—N/a
2001	28	—N/a	Silver	4	6	DNF	—	Silver	—N/a
2003	30	—N/a	7	7	9	4	—	Bronze	—N/a
2005	32	—N/a	38	12	—N/a	5	—	7	—
2007	34	—N/a	—	14	—N/a	DNF	—	Bronze	—
2009	36	—N/a	31	17	—N/a	29	—	6	—

=== World Cup ===
==== Season titles ====
- 1 title – (1 overall)

Season
Season	Discipline
2003	Overall

==== Season standings ====
Season	Age	Discipline standings					Ski Tour standings		
Season	Age	Overall	Distance	Long Distance	Middle Distance	Sprint	Nordic Opening	Tour de Ski	World Cup Final
1994	21	55	—N/a	—N/a	—N/a	—N/a	—N/a	—N/a	—N/a
1995	22	21	—N/a	—N/a	—N/a	—N/a	—N/a	—N/a	—N/a
1996	23	38	—N/a	—N/a	—N/a	—N/a	—N/a	—N/a	—N/a
1997	24	11	—N/a	6	—N/a	14	—N/a	—N/a	—N/a
1998	25	10	—N/a	11	—N/a	8	—N/a	—N/a	—N/a
1999	26	4	—N/a	6	—N/a	3rd place, bronze medalist(s)	—N/a	—N/a	—N/a
2000	27	24	—N/a	30	39	7	—N/a	—N/a	—N/a
2001	28	13	—N/a	—N/a	—N/a	31	—N/a	—N/a	—N/a
2002	29	20	—N/a	—N/a	—N/a	62	—N/a	—N/a	—N/a
2003	30	1st place, gold medalist(s)	—N/a	—N/a	—N/a	30	—N/a	—N/a	—N/a
2004	31	2nd place, silver medalist(s)	2nd place, silver medalist(s)	—N/a	—N/a	40	—N/a	—N/a	—N/a
2005	32	6	7	—N/a	—N/a	44	—N/a	—N/a	—N/a
2006	33	10	6	—N/a	—N/a	74	—N/a	—N/a	—N/a
2007	34	12	7	—N/a	—N/a	65	—N/a	14	—N/a
2008	35	83	52	—N/a	—N/a	NC	—N/a	DNF	—
2009	36	108	64	—N/a	—N/a	—	—N/a	DNF	—
2010	37	129	82	—N/a	—N/a	NC	—N/a	DNF	—
2011	38	144	90	—N/a	—N/a	—	—	—	—

==== Individual podiums ====
- 9 victories – (9 WC)
- 15 podiums – (15 WC)

No.	Season	Date	Location	Race	Level	Place
1	1996–97	11 March 1997	Sunne, Sweden	1.0 km Sprint F	World Cup	3rd
2	1998–99	10 December 1998	Milan, Italy	0.6 km Sprint F	World Cup	1st
3	2001–02	8 January 2002	Val di Fiemme, Italy	30 km Mass Start C	World Cup	3rd
4	2002–03	7 December 2002	Davos, Switzerland	15 km Individual F	World Cup	1st
5	2002–03	14 December 2002	Cogne, Italy	30 km Mass Start C	World Cup	3rd
6	2002–03	4 January 2003	Kavgolovo, Russia	10 km Individual F	World Cup	2nd
7	2002–03	25 January 2003	Oberhof, Germany	15 km Mass Start C	World Cup	1st
8	2002–03	16 March 2003	Lahti, Finland	15 km Individual F	World Cup	1st
9	2002–03	22 March 2003	Falun, Sweden	10 km + 10 km Pursuit C/F	World Cup	1st
10	2003–04	6 December 2003	Toblach, Italy	30 km Mass Start F	World Cup	1st
11	2003–04	20 December 2003	Ramsau, Austria	15 km + 15 km Pursuit C/F	World Cup	1st
12	2003–04	21 February 2004	Umeå, Sweden	15 km Individual C	World Cup	1st
13	2004–05	22 January 2005	Pragelato, Italy	15 km + 15 km Pursuit C/F	World Cup	2nd
14	2005–06	19 March 2006	Sapporo, Japan	15 km + 15 km Pursuit C/F	World Cup	1st
15	2006–07	24 March 2007	Falun, Sweden	15 km + 15 km Pursuit C/F	World Cup	2nd

==== Team podiums ====
- 5 victories – (4 RL, 1 TS)
- 19 podiums – (18 RL, 1 TS)

No.	Season	Date	Location	Race	Level	Place	Teammate(s)
1	1994–95	14 January 1995	Nové Město, Czech Republic	4 × 10 km Relay C	World Cup	2nd	Jonsson / Majbäck / Forsberg
2	1994–95	5 February 1995	Falun, Sweden	4 × 10 km Relay F	World Cup	3rd	Bergström / Håland / Forsberg
3	1994–95	12 February 1995	Oslo, Norway	4 × 5 km Relay C/F	World Cup	3rd	Jonsson / Mogren / Forsberg
4	1995–96	25 February 1996	Trondheim, Norway	4 × 10 km Relay C/F	World Cup	3rd	Jonsson / Bergström / Mogren
5	1996–97	8 December 1996	Davos, Switzerland	4 × 10 km Relay C	World Cup	2nd	Bergström / Jonsson / Forsberg
6	1996–97	15 December 1996	Brusson, Italy	4 × 10 km Relay F	World Cup	3rd	Bergström / Jonsson / Mogren
7	1996–97	9 March 1997	Falun, Sweden	4 × 10 km Relay C/F	World Cup	3rd	Forsberg / Mogren / Bergström
8	1997–98	11 January 1998	Ramsau, Austria	4 × 10 km Relay C/F	World Cup	2nd	Jonsson / Elofsson / Mogren
9	1997–98	10 March 1998	Falun, Sweden	10 × 1.6 km Team Sprint F	World Cup	1st	Elofsson
10	1998–99	29 November 1998	Muonio, Finland	4 × 10 km Relay F	World Cup	1st	Bergström / Ingesson / Elofsson
11	1998–99	19 December 1998	Davos, Switzerland	4 × 10 km Relay C/F	World Cup	2nd	Bergström / Jonsson / Elofsson
12	1998–99	13 March 1999	Falun, Sweden	4 × 10 km Relay C/F	World Cup	1st	Bergström / Elofsson / Brink
13	2000–01	18 March 2001	Falun, Sweden	4 × 10 km Relay C/F	World Cup	2nd	Lindgren / Göransson / Elofsson
14	2001–02	27 November 2001	Kuopio, Finland	4 × 10 km Relay C/F	World Cup	2nd	Lindgren / Elofsson / Brink
15	2001–02	16 December 2001	Davos, Switzerland	4 × 10 km Relay C/F	World Cup	1st	Lindgren / Jonsson / Elofsson
16	2001–02	10 March 2002	Falun, Sweden	4 × 10 km Relay C/F	World Cup	2nd	Elofsson / Södergren / Östberg
17	2002–03	23 March 2003	Falun, Sweden	4 × 10 km Relay C/F	World Cup	1st	Carlsson / Södergren / Brink
18	2003–04	22 February 2004	Umeå, Sweden	4 × 10 km Relay C/F	World Cup	3rd	Larsson / Brink / Högberg
19	2004–05	20 March 2005	Falun, Sweden	4 × 10 km Relay C/F	World Cup	3rd	Fredriksson / Karlsson / Södergren

== See also ==
- List of Olympic medalist families
