= Röbäck =

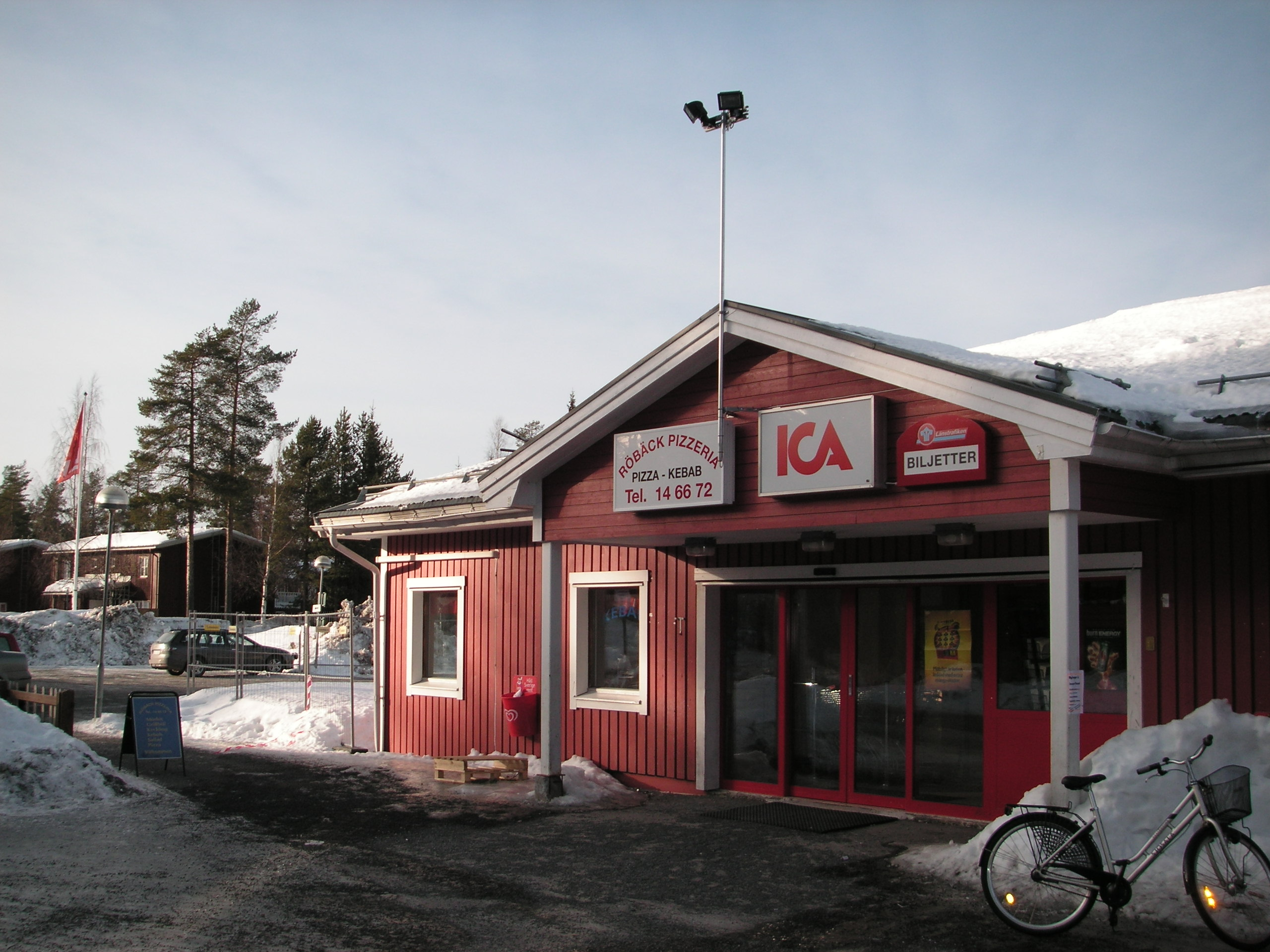
- Röbäck in March 2011

- Location within Västerbotten Location within Sweden
- Coordinates: 63°49′N 20°11′E
- Country: Sweden
- Province: Västerbotten
- County: Västerbotten County
- Municipality: Umeå Municipality

Area
  - Total: 1.19 km^{2} (0.46 sq mi)

Population (31 December 2010)
  - Total: 2,230
  - Density: 1,877/km^{2} (4,860/sq mi)
- Time zone: UTC+1 (CET)
  - Summer (DST): UTC+2 (CEST)

Röbäck is a locality situated in Umeå Municipality, Västerbotten County, Sweden with 2,230 inhabitants in 2010.
