= 2001–02 FIS Cross-Country World Cup =

Cross-country skiing competition

Discipline	Men	Women
Overall	(Sweden) Per Elofsson (2nd title)	(Norway) Bente Skari (3rd title)
Distance	(not arranged)	(not arranged)
Sprint	(Norway) Trond Iversen	(Norway) Bente Skari
Nations Cup	Norway	Norway
- Nations Cup Overall: Norway

Competition
Locations	15 venues	15 venues
Individual	20 events	20 events
Relay/Team	5 events	5 events

The 2001–02 FIS Cross-Country World Cup was the 21st official World Cup season in cross-country skiing for men and women. The season began in Kuopio, Finland on 24 November 2001 and finished in Lillehammer, Norway on 23 March 2002. Per Elofsson of Sweden won the overall men's cup, and Bente Skari of Norway won the women's.

== Calendar ==
=== Men ===
Key: C – Classic / F – Freestyle
WC	Date	Place	Discipline	Winner	Second	Third	Yellow bib	Ref.
1	24 November 2001	(Finland) Kuopio	15 km C	(Norway) Anders Aukland	(Norway) Erling Jevne	(Norway) Frode Estil	(Norway) Anders Aukland	
2	25 November 2001	(Finland) Kuopio	10 km F	(Sweden) Per Elofsson	(Norway) Ole Einar Bjørndalen	(Norway) Thomas Alsgaard	(Norway) Anders Aukland	
3	8 December 2001	(Italy) Cogne	10 km C	(Norway) Anders Aukland	(Sweden) Per Elofsson	(Norway) Frode Estil	(Norway) Anders Aukland	
4	9 December 2001	(Italy) Cogne	Sprint F	(Italy) Cristian Zorzi	(Norway) Tor Arne Hetland	(Liechtenstein) Markus Hasler	(Norway) Anders Aukland	
5	12 December 2001	(Italy) Brusson	15 km F	(Spain) Johann Mühlegg	(Austria) Christian Hoffmann	(Sweden) Per Elofsson	(Sweden) Per Elofsson	
6	15 December 2001	(Switzerland) Davos	15 km C	(Norway) Erling Jevne	(Sweden) Per Elofsson	(Slovakia) Ivan Bátory	(Sweden) Per Elofsson	
7	19 December 2001	(Italy) Asiago	Sprint C	(Norway) Jens Arne Svartedal	(Norway) Trond Iversen	(Germany) Andreas Schlütter	(Sweden) Per Elofsson	
8	22 December 2001	(Austria) Ramsau	30 km F Mass Start	(Sweden) Per Elofsson	(Norway) Ole Einar Bjørndalen	(Austria) Christian Hoffmann	(Sweden) Per Elofsson	
9	27 December 2001	(Germany) Garmisch-Partenkirchen	Sprint F	(Italy) Cristian Zorzi	(Norway) Tor Arne Hetland	(Sweden) Peter Larsson	(Sweden) Per Elofsson	
10	29 December 2001	(Austria) Salzburg	Sprint F	(Norway) Håvard Bjerkeli	(Norway) Trond Einar Elden	(Norway) Tor Arne Hetland	(Sweden) Per Elofsson	
11	5 January 2002	(Italy) Val di Fiemme	10 km C + 10 km F Double Pursuit	(Sweden) Per Elofsson	(Norway) Thomas Alsgaard	(Norway) Anders Aukland	(Sweden) Per Elofsson	
12	6 January 2002	(Italy) Val di Fiemme	Sprint F	(Norway) Trond Iversen	(Finland) Keijo Kurttila	(Sweden) Thobias Fredriksson	(Sweden) Per Elofsson	
13	8 January 2002	(Italy) Val di Fiemme	30 km C Mass Start	(Norway) Anders Aukland	(Russia) Vitaly Denisov	(Sweden) Mathias Fredriksson	(Sweden) Per Elofsson	
14	12 January 2002	(Czech Republic) Nové Město	10 km F	(Italy) Fabio Maj	(Estonia) Jaak Mae	(Norway) Kristen Skjeldal	(Sweden) Per Elofsson	
2002 Winter Olympics (8–24 February)
15	2 March 2002	(Finland) Lahti	15 km F	(Sweden) Per Elofsson	(Norway) Thomas Alsgaard	(Norway) Tore Ruud Hofstad	(Sweden) Per Elofsson	
16	5 March 2002	(Sweden) Stockholm	Sprint C	(Norway) Jens Arne Svartedal	(Norway) Trond Iversen	(Sweden) Björn Lind	(Sweden) Per Elofsson	
17	9 March 2002	(Sweden) Falun	10 km C + 10 km F Double Pursuit	(Norway) Thomas Alsgaard	(Norway) Kristen Skjeldal	(Sweden) Per Elofsson	(Sweden) Per Elofsson	
18	13 March 2002	(Norway) Oslo	Sprint C	(Norway) Jens Arne Svartedal	(Sweden) Jörgen Brink	(Finland) Keijo Kurttila	(Sweden) Per Elofsson	
19	16 March 2002	(Norway) Oslo	50 km F	(Norway) Thomas Alsgaard	(Norway) Kristen Skjeldal	(Italy) Pietro Piller Cottrer	(Sweden) Per Elofsson	
20	23 March 2002	(Norway) Lillehammer	58 km C (Birkebeinerrennet)	(Norway) Thomas Alsgaard	(Norway) Anders Aukland	(Norway) Frode Estil	(Sweden) Per Elofsson	

=== Women ===
Key: C – Classic / F – Freestyle
WC	Date	Place	Discipline	Winner	Second	Third	Yellow bib	Ref.
1	24 November 2001	(Finland) Kuopio	10 km C	(Norway) Bente Skari	(Russia) Olga Danilova	(Sweden) Lina Andersson	(Norway) Bente Skari	
2	25 November 2001	(Finland) Kuopio	5 km F	(Czech Republic) Kateřina Neumannová	(Russia) Yuliya Chepalova	(Estonia) Kristina Šmigun	(Russia) Olga Danilova	
3	8 December 2001	(Italy) Cogne	10 km C	(Norway) Bente Skari	(Russia) Olga Danilova	(Norway) Vibeke Skofterud	(Russia) Olga Danilova	
4	9 December 2001	(Italy) Cogne	Sprint F	(Czech Republic) Kateřina Neumannová	(Norway) Vibeke Skofterud	(Norway) Hilde Gjermundshaug Pedersen	(Czech Republic) Kateřina Neumannová	
5	12 December 2001	(Italy) Brusson	10 km F	(Russia) Yuliya Chepalova	(Italy) Stefania Belmondo	(Estonia) Kristina Šmigun	(Czech Republic) Kateřina Neumannová	
6	15 December 2001	(Switzerland) Davos	10 km C	(Norway) Bente Skari	(Estonia) Kristina Šmigun	(Italy) Stefania Belmondo	(Czech Republic) Kateřina Neumannová	
7	19 December 2001	(Italy) Asiago	Sprint C	(Norway) Bente Skari	(Slovenia) Petra Majdič	(Canada) Beckie Scott	(Norway) Bente Skari	
8	22 December 2001	(Austria) Ramsau	15 km F Mass Start	(Estonia) Kristina Šmigun	(Italy) Stefania Belmondo	(Russia) Yelena Burukhina	(Norway) Bente Skari	
9	27 December 2001	(Germany) Garmisch-Partenkirchen	Sprint F	(Germany) Evi Sachenbacher	(Italy) Sabina Valbusa	(Norway) Maj Helen Sorkmo	(Norway) Bente Skari	
10	29 December 2001	(Austria) Salzburg	Sprint F	(Norway) Anita Moen	(Czech Republic) Kateřina Neumannová	(Norway) Maj Helen Sorkmo	(Czech Republic) Kateřina Neumannová	
11	5 January 2002	(Italy) Val di Fiemme	5 km C + 5 km F Double Pursuit	(Russia) Olga Danilova	(Norway) Bente Skari	(Czech Republic) Kateřina Neumannová	(Norway) Bente Skari	
12	6 January 2002	(Italy) Val di Fiemme	Sprint F	(Czech Republic) Kateřina Neumannová	(Norway) Hilde Gjermundshaug Pedersen	(Italy) Sabina Valbusa	(Czech Republic) Kateřina Neumannová	
13	8 January 2002	(Italy) Val di Fiemme	15 km F Mass Start	(Norway) Bente Skari	(Russia) Olga Danilova	(Russia) Svetlana Nageykina	(Norway) Bente Skari	
14	12 January 2002	(Czech Republic) Nové Město	5 km F	(Russia) Yuliya Chepalova	(Czech Republic) Kateřina Neumannová	(Italy) Stefania Belmondo	(Czech Republic) Kateřina Neumannová	
2002 Winter Olympics (8–24 February)
15	2 March 2002	(Finland) Lahti	10 km F	(Estonia) Kristina Šmigun	(Italy) Stefania Belmondo	(Russia) Nina Gavrylyuk	(Czech Republic) Kateřina Neumannová	
16	5 March 2002	(Sweden) Stockholm	Sprint C	(Norway) Bente Skari	(Slovenia) Petra Majdič	(Norway) Anita Moen	(Norway) Bente Skari	
17	9 March 2002	(Sweden) Falun	5 km C + 5 km F Double Pursuit	(Italy) Stefania Belmondo	(Russia) Nina Gavrylyuk	(Italy) Gabriella Paruzzi	(Norway) Bente Skari	
18	13 March 2002	(Norway) Oslo	Sprint C	(Norway) Bente Skari	(Sweden) Lina Andersson	(Germany) Manuela Henkel	(Norway) Bente Skari	
19	16 March 2002	(Norway) Oslo	30 km F	(Italy) Stefania Belmondo	(Estonia) Kristina Šmigun	(Italy) Gabriella Paruzzi	(Norway) Bente Skari	
20	23 March 2002	(Norway) Lillehammer	58 km C (Birkebeinerrennet)	(Norway) Anita Moen	(Norway) Vibeke Skofterud	(Germany) Manuela Henkel	(Norway) Bente Skari	

=== Men's team ===
WC	Date	Place	Discipline	Winner	Second	Third	Ref.
1	27 November 2001	(Finland) Kuopio	4 × 10 km relay C/F	Norway Odd-Bjørn Hjelmeset; Erling Jevne; Håvard Bjerkeli; Tor Arne Hetland	Sweden Urban Lindgren; Mathias Fredriksson; Per Elofsson; Jörgen Brink	Russia Vasily Rochev; Mikhail Ivanov; Nikolay Bolshakov; Vladimir Vilissov	
2	16 December 2001	(Switzerland) Davos	4 × 10 km relay C/F	Sweden Urban Lindgren; Mathias Fredriksson; Niklas Jonsson; Per Elofsson	Russia Vitaly Denisov; Mikhail Ivanov; Vladimir Vilissov; Nikolay Bolshakov	Norway Frode Estil; Erling Jevne; Thomas Alsgaard; Tor Arne Hetland	
3	13 January 2002	(Czech Republic) Nové Město	Team Sprint F	Italy II Fabio Maj; Freddy Schwienbacher	Italy I Giorgio Di Centa; Cristian Zorzi	Finland III Teemu Kattilakoski; Sami Repo	
4	3 March 2002	(Finland) Lahti	Team Sprint F	Italy Giorgio Di Centa; Cristian Zorzi	Germany René Sommerfeldt; Tobias Angerer	Czech Republic Lukáš Bauer; Martin Koukal	
5	10 March 2002	(Sweden) Falun	4 × 10 km relay C/F	Norway I Frode Estil; Anders Aukland; Kristen Skjeldal; Thomas Alsgaard	Sweden Mathias Fredriksson; Per Elofsson; Anders Södergren; Fredrik Östberg	Norway II Jens Arne Svartedal; Erling Jevne; Tore Ruud Hofstad; Tore Bjonviken	

=== Women's team ===
WC	Date	Place	Discipline	Winner	Second	Third	Ref.
1	27 November 2001	(Finland) Kuopio	4 × 5 km relay C/F	Russia I Olga Danilova; Natalya Baranova-Masalkina; Nina Gavrylyuk; Yuliya Chepalova	Russia II Alyona Sidko; Lyubov Yegorova; Yelena Burukhina; Olga Zavyalova	Sweden Lina Andersson; Elin Ek; Anna Dahlberg; Jenny Olsson	
2	16 December 2001	(Switzerland) Davos	4 × 5 km relay C/F	Norway Tina Bay; Bente Skari; Hilde Gjermundshaug Pedersen; Vibeke Skofterud	Russia III Alyona Sidko; Olga Moskalenko; Yelena Burukhina; Ekaterina Stchastlivaia	Italy Cristina Paluselli; Gabriella Paruzzi; Arianna Follis; Stefania Belmondo	
3	13 January 2002	(Czech Republic) Nové Město	Team Sprint F	Russia Yevgeniya Medvedeva-Arbuzova; Yuliya Chepalova	Italy Gabriella Paruzzi; Sabina Valbusa	Finland Riikka Sirviö; Riitta-Liisa Lassila	
4	3 March 2002	(Finland) Lahti	Team Sprint F	Italy Gabriella Paruzzi; Sabina Valbusa	Russia Olga Zavyalova; Nina Gavrylyuk	France/Italy Karine Philippot; Stefania Belmondo	
5	10 March 2002	(Sweden) Falun	4 × 5 km relay C/F	Italy Sabina Valbusa; Gabriella Paruzzi; Cristina Paluselli; Stefania Belmondo	Norway Anita Moen; Marit Bjørgen; Hilde Gjermundshaug Pedersen; Vibeke Skofterud	Germany Manuela Henkel; Viola Bauer; Claudia Künzel; Evi Sachenbacher	

== Men's standings ==
=== Overall ===
Rank	Skier	Points
	(Sweden) Per Elofsson	780
2	(Norway) Thomas Alsgaard	777
3	(Norway) Anders Aukland	545
4	(Norway) Kristen Skjeldal	518
5	(Norway) Frode Estil	404
6	(Estonia) Jaak Mae	401
7	(Italy) Cristian Zorzi	327
8	(Spain) Johann Mühlegg	322
9	(Norway) Jens Arne Svartedal	315
10	(Norway) Erling Jevne	307

Rank	Skier	Points
11	(Czech Republic) Lukáš Bauer	303
12	(Norway) Trond Iversen	260
13	(Norway) Tor Arne Hetland	258
14	(Germany) Tobias Angerer	231
15	(Italy) Pietro Piller Cottrer	226
16	(Sweden) Jörgen Brink	214
17	(Germany) Andreas Schlütter	211
18	(Norway) Håvard Bjerkeli	210
19	(Estonia) Andrus Veerpalu	201
20	(Sweden) Mathias Fredriksson	198

Rank	Skier	Points
21	(Slovakia) Ivan Bátory	197
22	(Norway) Espen Bjervig	196
23	(Italy) Fabio Maj	179
24	(France) Vincent Vittoz	174
25	(Norway) Odd-Bjørn Hjelmeset	171
26	(Italy) Giorgio Di Centa	170
27	(Italy) Freddy Schwienbacher	167
28	(Austria) Christian Hoffmann	163
29	(Norway) Ole Einar Bjørndalen	160
30	(Sweden) Thobias Fredriksson	150

=== Sprint ===
Rank	Skier	Points
	(Norway) Trond Iversen	328
2	(Norway) Jens Arne Svartedal	300
3	(Italy) Cristian Zorzi	264
4	(Sweden) Thobias Fredriksson	254
5	(Norway) Håvard Bjerkeli	249
6	(Norway) Tor Arne Hetland	247
7	(Sweden) Björn Lind	205
8	(Sweden) Jörgen Brink	155
9	(Finland) Keijo Kurttila	154
10	(Italy) Freddy Schwienbacher	149

== Women's standings ==
=== Overall ===
Rank	Skier	Points
	(Norway) Bente Skari	877
2	(Czech Republic) Kateřina Neumannová	763
3	(Italy) Stefania Belmondo	760
4	(Estonia) Kristina Šmigun	649
5	(Russia) Yuliya Chepalova	612
6	(Norway) Hilde Gjermundshaug Pedersen	552
7	(Russia) Olga Danilova	488
8	(Italy) Gabriella Paruzzi	467
9	(Norway) Anita Moen	440
10	(Italy) Sabina Valbusa	381

Rank	Skier	Points
11	(Norway) Vibeke Skofterud	370
12	(Russia) Olga Zavyalova	345
13	(Russia) Nina Gavrylyuk	330
14	(Slovenia) Petra Majdič	311
15	(Sweden) Lina Andersson	290
16	(Germany) Evi Sachenbacher	289
17	(Russia) Lyubov Yegorova	263
18	(Germany) Manuela Henkel	258
19	(Ukraine) Valentyna Shevchenko	254
20	(Russia) Natalya Baranova-Masalkina	235

Rank	Skier	Points
21	(Germany) Viola Bauer	218
22	(Canada) Beckie Scott	216
23	(Russia) Svetlana Nageykina	214
24	(Norway) Maj Helen Sorkmo	199
25	(Finland) Kaisa Varis	194
26	(Finland) Kati Venäläinen	191
27	(Norway) Tina Bay	183
28	(Russia) Yelena Burukhina	178
29	(France) Karine Philippot	165
30	(Finland) Satu Salonen	162

=== Sprint ===
Rank	Skier	Points
	(Norway) Bente Skari	319
2	(Norway) Anita Moen	307
3	(Czech Republic) Kateřina Neumannová	293
4	(Germany) Evi Sachenbacher	237
5	(Norway) Hilde Gjermundshaug Pedersen	223
6	(Germany) Manuela Henkel	209
7	(Norway) Maj Helen Sorkmo	203
8	(Italy) Sabina Valbusa	201
9	(Slovenia) Petra Majdič	200
10	(Canada) Beckie Scott	158

== Achievements ==
Victories in this World Cup (all-time number of victories as of 2001–02 season in parentheses)

Men

- Per Elofsson (SWE), 4 (11) first places
- Thomas Alsgaard (NOR), 3 (13) first places
- Anders Aukland (NOR), 3 (3) first places
- Jens Arne Svartedal (NOR), 3 (3) first places
- Cristian Zorzi (ITA), 2 (4) first places
- Johann Mühlegg (ESP), 1 (7) first place
- Erling Jevne (NOR), 1 (3) first place
- Fabio Maj (ITA), 1 (2) first place
- Håvard Bjerkeli (NOR), 1 (1) first place
- Trond Iversen (NOR), 1 (1) first place

Women

- Bente Skari (NOR), 7 (28) first places
- Kateřina Neumannová (CZE), 3 (7) first places
- Stefania Belmondo (ITA), 2 (23) first places
- Yuliya Chepalova (RUS), 2 (13) first places
- Kristina Šmigun (EST), 2 (7) first places
- Anita Moen (NOR), 2 (3) first place
- Olga Danilova (RUS), 1 (4) first place
- Evi Sachenbacher (GER), 1 (1) first place
