= 1998–99 FIS Cross-Country World Cup =

Cross-country skiing competition

Discipline	Men	Women
Overall	(Norway) Bjørn Dæhlie (6th title)	(Norway) Bente Martinsen
Long Distance	(Austria) Mikhail Botvinov	(Estonia) Kristina Šmigun
Sprint	(Norway) Bjørn Dæhlie	(Norway) Bente Martinsen
Nations Cup	Norway	Russia
- Nations Cup Overall: Norway

Competition
Locations	14 venues	14 venues
Individual	19 events	19 events
Relay/Team	6 events	6 events

The 1998–99 FIS Cross-Country World Cup was the 18th official World Cup season in cross-country skiing for men and women. The season began in Muonio, Finland on 28 November 1998 and finished at Holmenkollen, Oslo, Norway on 20 March 1999. Bjørn Dæhlie of Norway won the overall men's cup. Bente Martinsen of Norway won the women's cup on more victories than Stefania Belmondo of Italy after both finished the season achieving 768 points.

The 1998–99 season was the last season the results from World Championships counted in the overall World Cup standings.

== Calendar ==
=== Men ===
C - Classic / F - Freestyle
WC	Date	Location	Discipline	Winner	Second	Third	Ref.
1	28 November 1998	(Finland) Muonio	10 km F	(Sweden) Per Elofsson	(Norway) Bjørn Dæhlie	(Finland) Sami Repo	
2	10 December 1998	(Italy) Milan	Sprint F	(Sweden) Mathias Fredriksson	(Germany) Peter Schlickenrieder	(Sweden) Thobias Fredriksson	
3	12 December 1998	(Italy) Toblach	10 km F	(Norway) Bjørn Dæhlie	(Austria) Mikhail Botvinov	(Austria) Alois Stadlober	
4	13 December 1998	(Italy) Toblach	15 km C	(Norway) Bjørn Dæhlie	(Norway) Espen Bjervig	(Finland) Jari Isometsä	
5	19 December 1998	(Switzerland) Davos	30 km C	(Norway) Bjørn Dæhlie	(Russia) Alexey Prokurorov	(Austria) Mikhail Botvinov	
6	27 December 1998	(Germany) Garmisch-Partenkirchen	Sprint F	(Norway) Tor Arne Hetland	(Sweden) Thobias Fredriksson	(Finland) Ari Palolahti	
7	28 December 1998	(Switzerland) Engelberg	Sprint F	(Norway) Tor Arne Hetland	(Austria) Christian Hoffmann	(Switzerland) Patrik Mächler	
8	29 December 1998	(Austria) Kitzbühel	Sprint F	(Germany) Peter Schlickenrieder	(Sweden) Thobias Fredriksson	(Austria) Christian Hoffmann	
9	5 January 1999	(Estonia) Otepää	15 km C	(Norway) Espen Bjervig	(Finland) Mika Myllylä	(Sweden) Anders Bergström	
10	9 January 1999	(Czech Republic) Nové Město	15 km C	(Norway) Bjørn Dæhlie	(Norway) Erling Jevne	(Norway) Espen Bjervig	
11	12 January 1999	(Czech Republic) Nové Město	30 km F	(Austria) Mikhail Botvinov	(Norway) Bjørn Dæhlie	(Sweden) Per Elofsson	
12	14 February 1999	(Austria) Seefeld	10 km F	(Finland) Mika Myllylä	(Austria) Mikhail Botvinov	(Finland) Jari Isometsä	
FIS Nordic World Ski Championships 1999 (19–28 February 1999)
13	19 February 1999	(Austria) Ramsau	30 km F	(Finland) Mika Myllylä	(Norway) Thomas Alsgaard	(Norway) Bjørn Dæhlie	
14	22 February 1999	(Austria) Ramsau	10 km C	(Finland) Mika Myllylä	(Austria) Alois Stadlober	(Norway) Odd-Bjørn Hjelmeset	
15	23 February 1999	(Austria) Ramsau	10 km C + 15 km F Combined pursuit	(Norway) Thomas Alsgaard	(Finland) Mika Myllylä	(Italy) Fulvio Valbusa	
16	28 February 1999	(Austria) Ramsau	50 km C	(Finland) Mika Myllylä	(Estonia) Andrus Veerpalu	(Austria) Mikhail Botvinov	
17	7 March 1999	(Finland) Lahti	15 km C	(Norway) Bjørn Dæhlie	(Russia) Vladimir Vilisov	(Norway) Frode Estil	
18	13 March 1999	(Sweden) Falun	30 km C	(Sweden) Anders Bergström	(Austria) Mikhail Botvinov	(Finland) Mika Myllylä	
19	20 March 1999	(Norway) Oslo	50 km C	(Austria) Mikhail Botvinov	(Norway) Bjørn Dæhlie	(Austria) Christian Hoffmann	

Note: Until 1999 World Championships, World Championship races are part of the World Cup. Hence results from those races are included in the World Cup overall.

=== Women ===
C - Classic / F - Freestyle
WC	Date	Location	Discipline	Winner	Second	Third	Ref.
1	28 November 1998	(Finland) Muonio	5 km F	(Czech Republic) Kateřina Neumannová	(Italy) Stefania Belmondo	(Russia) Nina Gavrylyuk	
2	10 December 1998	(Italy) Milan	Sprint F	(Norway) Anita Moen	(Slovenia) Andreja Mali	(Norway) Bente Martinsen	
3	12 December 1998	(Italy) Toblach	5 km F	(Czech Republic) Kateřina Neumannová	(Sweden) Antonina Ordina	(Russia) Nina Gavrylyuk	
4	13 December 1998	(Italy) Toblach	10 km C	(Norway) Bente Martinsen	(Russia) Nina Gavrylyuk	(Sweden) Antonina Ordina	
5	19 December 1998	(Switzerland) Davos	15 km C	(Russia) Olga Danilova	(Norway) Bente Martinsen	(Russia) Larisa Lazutina	
6	27 December 1998	(Germany) Garmisch-Partenkirchen	Sprint F	(Norway) Bente Martinsen	(Estonia) Kristina Šmigun	(Slovenia) Andreja Mali	
7	28 December 1998	(Switzerland) Engelberg	Sprint F	(Norway) Bente Martinsen	(Norway) Maj Helen Sorkmo	(Italy) Karin Moroder	
8	29 December 1998	(Austria) Kitzbühel	Sprint F	(Norway) Bente Martinsen	(Slovenia) Andreja Mali	(Norway) Anne Kristi Marken	
9	5 January 1999	(Estonia) Otepää	10 km C	(Norway) Bente Martinsen	(Sweden) Antonina Ordina	(Estonia) Kristina Šmigun	
10	9 January 1999	(Czech Republic) Nové Město	10 km C	(Norway) Bente Martinsen	(Czech Republic) Kateřina Neumannová	(Russia) Svetlana Nageykina	
11	12 January 1999	(Czech Republic) Nové Město	15 km F	(Estonia) Kristina Šmigun	(Italy) Stefania Belmondo	(Russia) Nina Gavrylyuk	
12	14 February 1999	(Austria) Seefeld	5 km F	(Russia) Nina Gavrylyuk	(Russia) Anfisa Reztsova	(Italy) Stefania Belmondo	
FIS Nordic World Ski Championships 1999 (19–28 February 1999)
13	19 February 1999	(Austria) Ramsau	15 km F	(Italy) Stefania Belmondo	(Estonia) Kristina Šmigun	(Austria) Maria Theurl	
14	22 February 1999	(Austria) Ramsau	5 km C	(Norway) Bente Martinsen	(Russia) Olga Danilova	(Czech Republic) Kateřina Neumannová	
15	23 February 1999	(Austria) Ramsau	5 km C + 10 km F Combined pursuit	(Italy) Stefania Belmondo	(Russia) Nina Gavrylyuk	(Ukraine) Iryna Terelia	
16	27 February 1999	(Austria) Ramsau	30 km C	(Russia) Larisa Lazutina	(Russia) Olga Danilova	(Estonia) Kristina Šmigun	
17	7 March 1999	(Finland) Lahti	10 km C	(Russia) Larisa Lazutina	(Norway) Bente Martinsen	(Czech Republic) Kateřina Neumannová	
18	13 March 1999	(Sweden) Falun	15 km C	(Russia) Larisa Lazutina	(Russia) Svetlana Nageykina	(Russia) Natalya Baranova-Masalkina	
19	20 March 1999	(Norway) Oslo	30 km C	(Russia) Yuliya Chepalova	(Italy) Stefania Belmondo	(Estonia) Kristina Šmigun	

Note: Until 1999 World Championships, World Championship races are part of the World Cup. Hence results from those races are included in the World Cup overall.

=== Men's team ===
WC	Date	Place	Discipline	Winner	Second	Third	Ref.
1	29 November 1998	(Finland) Muonio	4 × 10 km relay F	Sweden Anders Bergström; Magnus Ingesson; Mathias Fredriksson; Per Elofsson	Norway Ole Einar Bjørndalen; Kristen Skjeldal; Bjørn Dæhlie; Tor Arne Hetland	Italy Fabio Maj; Silvio Fauner; Pietro Piller Cottrer; Maurizio Pozzi	
2	20 December 1999	(Switzerland) Davos	4 × 10 km relay C/F	Norway Espen Bjervig; Erling Jevne; Bjørn Dæhlie; Tor Arne Hetland	Sweden Anders Bergström; Niklas Jonsson; Mathias Fredriksson; Per Elofsson	Austria Alexander Marent; Alois Stadlober; Mikhail Botvinov; Achim Walcher	
3	10 January 1999	(Czech Republic) Nové Město	4 × 10 km relay C/F	Austria Markus Gandler; Alexander Marent; Mikhail Botvinov; Christian Hoffmann	Italy Fulvio Valbusa; Fabio Maj; Pietro Piller Cottrer; Silvio Fauner	Norway Odd-Bjørn Hjelmeset; Erling Jevne; Frode Jermstad; Tor Arne Hetland	
4	26 February 1999	(Austria) Ramsau	4 × 10 km relay C/F	Austria Markus Gandler; Alois Stadlober; Mikhail Botvinov; Christian Hoffmann	Norway Espen Bjervig; Erling Jevne; Bjørn Dæhlie; Thomas Alsgaard	Italy Giorgio Di Centa; Fabio Maj; Fulvio Valbusa; Silvio Fauner	
5	14 March 1999	(Sweden) Falun	4 × 10 km relay C/F	Sweden Mathias Fredriksson; Anders Bergström; Per Elofsson; Jörgen Brink	Finland Janne Immonen; Harri Kirvesniemi; Mika Myllylä; Sami Repo	Russia Vitaly Denisov; Mikhail Ivanov; Alexey Prokurorov; Vladimir Vilisov	
6	21 March 1999	(Norway) Oslo	4 × 10 km relay C	Norway Frode Estil; Espen Bjervig; Anders Aukland; Odd-Bjørn Hjelmeset	Russia Vitaly Denisov; Mikhail Ivanov; Alexey Prokurorov; Vladimir Vilisov	Italy Silvio Fauner; Giorgio Di Centa; Fabio Maj; Fulvio Valbusa	

=== Women's team ===
WC	Date	Place	Discipline	Winner	Second	Third	Ref.
1	29 November 1998	(Finland) Muonio	4 × 5 km relay F	Russia I Olga Danilova; Anfisa Reztsova; Larisa Lazutina; Nina Gavrylyuk	Italy Karin Moroder; Gabriella Paruzzi; Sabina Valbusa; Stefania Belmondo	Norway Bente Martinsen; Elin Nilsen; Anita Moen; Maj Helen Sorkmo	
2	20 December 1999	(Switzerland) Davos	4 × 5 km relay C/F	Russia I Olga Danilova; Svetlana Nageykina; Larisa Lazutina; Nina Gavrylyuk	Italy Gabriella Paruzzi; Antonella Confortola; Stefania Belmondo; Sabina Valbusa	Russia II Marina Lazskaja; Natalya Baranova-Masalkina; Yuliya Chepalova; Anfisa Reztsova	
3	10 January 1999	(Czech Republic) Nové Město	4 × 5 km relay C/F	Russia Svetlana Nageykina; Nina Gavrylyuk; Anfisa Reztsova; Yuliya Chepalova	Norway Maj Helen Sorkmo; Anita Moen; Elin Nilsen; Bente Martinsen	Italy Gabriella Paruzzi; Antonella Confortola; Stefania Belmondo; Sabina Valbusa	
4	26 February 1999	(Austria) Ramsau	4 × 5 km relay C/F	Russia Olga Danilova; Larisa Lazutina; Anfisa Reztsova; Nina Gavrylyuk	Italy Sabina Valbusa; Gabriella Paruzzi; Antonella Confortola; Stefania Belmondo	Germany Viola Bauer; Ramona Roth; Evi Sachenbacher; Sigrid Wille	
5	14 March 1999	(Sweden) Falun	4 × 5 km relay C/F	Russia I Svetlana Nageykina; Natalya Baranova-Masalkina; Yuliya Chepalova; Larisa Lazutina	Russia II Nina Gavrylyuk; Lyubov Yegorova; Anfisa Reztsova; Irina Skladneva	Italy Sabina Valbusa; Gabriella Paruzzi; Antonella Confortola; Stefania Belmondo	
6	21 March 1999	(Norway) Oslo	4 × 5 km relay C	Russia I Svetlana Nageykina; Nina Gavrylyuk; Yuliya Chepalova; Larisa Lazutina	Russia II Natalya Baranova-Masalkina; Lyubov Yegorova; Anfisa Reztsova; Irina Skladneva	Norway Bente Martinsen; Hilde Glomsås; Elin Nilsen; Anita Moen	

== Men's standings ==
=== Overall ===
Rank	Skier	Points
1	(Norway) Bjørn Dæhlie	885
2	(Austria) Mikhail Botvinov	685
3	(Finland) Mika Myllylä	573
4	(Sweden) Mathias Fredriksson	484
5	(Sweden) Per Elofsson	465
6	(Sweden) Anders Bergström	454
7	(Norway) Espen Bjervig	406
8	(Finland) Jari Isometsä	370
9	(Russia) Alexey Prokurorov	366
10	(Norway) Erling Jevne	318

Rank	Skier	Points
11	(Austria) Alois Stadlober	279
12	(Italy) Fulvio Valbusa	273
13	(Norway) Thomas Alsgaard	266
14	(Sweden) Niklas Jonsson	259
15	(Slovakia) Ivan Bátory	248
	(Austria) Christian Hoffmann	248
17	(Norway) Odd-Bjørn Hjelmeset	246
18	(Italy) Fabio Maj	227
19	(Norway) Frode Estil	219
	(Norway) Kristen Skjeldal	219

Rank	Skier	Points
21	(Russia) Vladimir Vilisov	211
22	(Estonia) Andrus Veerpalu	189
23	(Norway) Tor Arne Hetland	170
24	(Italy) Silvio Fauner	169
25	(Italy) Giorgio Di Centa	132
26	(Italy) Maurizio Pozzi	115
27	(Estonia) Jaak Mae	113
28	(Germany) Andreas Schlütter	103
29	(Russia) Mikhail Ivanov	100
30	(Finland) Sami Repo	90

=== Long Distance ===
Rank	Skier	Points
1	(Austria) Mikhail Botvinov	413
2	(Norway) Bjørn Dæhlie	360
3	(Finland) Mika Myllylä	312
4	(Sweden) Anders Bergström	261
5	(Russia) Alexey Prokurorov	220
6	(Sweden) Mathias Fredriksson	176
7	(Italy) Fulvio Valbusa	157
8	(Sweden) Per Elofsson	141
9	(Sweden) Niklas Jonsson	129
10	(Norway) Kristen Skjeldal	122
	(Austria) Alois Stadlober	122

=== Sprint ===
Rank	Skier	Points
1	(Norway) Bjørn Dæhlie	480
2	(Norway) Tor Arne Hetland	354
3	(Sweden) Mathias Fredriksson	308
4	(Norway) Espen Bjervig	298
5	(Sweden) Per Elofsson	295
6	(Austria) Christian Hoffmann	287
7	(Austria) Mikhail Botvinov	272
8	(Finland) Mika Myllylä	261
9	(Sweden) Thobias Fredriksson	252
10	(Germany) Peter Schlickenrieder	247

== Women's standings ==
=== Overall ===
Rank	Skier	Points
1	(Norway) Bente Martinsen	768 ‡
2	(Italy) Stefania Belmondo	768 ‡
3	(Russia) Nina Gavrylyuk	705
4	(Estonia) Kristina Šmigun	666
5	(Russia) Larisa Lazutina	648
6	(Czech Republic) Kateřina Neumannová	618
7	—N/a	—N/a
8	(Russia) Olga Danilova	507
9	(Russia) Anfisa Reztsova	490
10	(Sweden) Antonina Ordina	430

Rank	Skier	Points
11	(Russia) Yuliya Chepalova	363
12	(Ukraine) Iryna Terelia	300
13	(Russia) Natalya Baranova-Masalkina	279
14	(Norway) Elin Nilsen	264
15	(Switzerland) Brigitte Albrecht	252
16	(Italy) Gabriella Paruzzi	246
17	(Austria) Maria Theurl	218
18	(Ukraine) Valentina Shevchenko	187
	(France) Sophie Villeneuve	187
20	(Norway) Anita Moen	170

=== Long Distance ===
Rank	Skier	Points
1	(Estonia) Kristina Šmigun	372
2	(Italy) Stefania Belmondo	345
3	(Russia) Larisa Lazutina	343
4	—N/a	—N/a
5	(Russia) Olga Danilova	240
6	(Russia) Nina Gavrylyuk	215
7	(Russia) Yuliya Chepalova	200
8	(Russia) Anfisa Reztsova	190
9	(Ukraine) Iryna Terelia	156
10	(Italy) Gabriella Paruzzi	147
	(Austria) Maria Theurl	147

=== Sprint ===
Rank	Skier	Points
1	(Norway) Bente Martinsen	806
2	(Czech Republic) Kateřina Neumannová	490
3	(Estonia) Kristina Šmigun	473
4	(Russia) Nina Gavrylyuk	401
5	(Italy) Stefania Belmondo	356
6	(Russia) Larisa Lazutina	305
7	(Sweden) Antonina Ordina	282
8	(Russia) Anfisa Reztsova	250
9	(Slovenia) Andreja Mali	240
10	(Norway) Anita Moen	235

Note: ‡ : When the season ended, Bente Martinsen and Stefania Belmondo were equal on points. Bente Martinsen won the Overall World Cup on most victories (Martinsen 7-2 Belmondo).

== Achievements ==
Victories in this World Cup (all-time number of victories as of 1998/99 season in parentheses)

Men

- Bjørn Dæhlie (NOR), 5 (46) first places
- Mika Myllylä (FIN), 4 (8) first places
- Tor Arne Hetland (NOR), 2 (3) first places
- Mikhail Botvinov (AUT), 2 (2) first places
- Thomas Alsgaard (NOR), 1 (5) first places
- Per Elofsson (SWE), 1 (1) first place
- Mathias Fredriksson (SWE), 1 (1) first place
- Peter Schlickenrieder (GER), 1 (1) first place
- Espen Bjervig (NOR), 1 (1) first place
- Anders Bergström (SWE), 1 (1) first place

Women

- Bente Martinsen (NOR), 7 (10) first places
- Larisa Lazutina (RUS), 3 (15) first places
- Stefania Belmondo (ITA), 2 (19) first places
- Kateřina Neumannová (CZE), 2 (3) first places
- Nina Gavrylyuk (RUS), 1 (4) first place
- Yuliya Chepalova (RUS), 1 (2) first place
- Anita Moen (NOR), 1 (1) first place
- Olga Danilova (RUS), 1 (1) first place
- Kristina Šmigun (EST), 1 (1) first place
