= Reforged – Machine World =

Studio album by Iron Savior
- Released: 22 August 2025
- Recorded: 2024–2025
- Studio: Powerhouse Studio, Hamburg, Germany
- Genre: Heavy metal, power metal
- Length: 83:13
- Label: Reigning Phoenix
- Producer: Piet Sielck

Iron Savior chronology
Firestar (2023)	Reforged – Machine World (2025)	Awesome Anthems of the Galaxy (2026)

Singles from Reforged – Machine World
- 1. "Eye of the World" Released: 1 June 2025; 2. "Walls of Fire" Released: 27 June 2025; 3. "Machine World" Released: 26 July 2025

Reforged – Machine World is the fifteenth studio album by German power metal band Iron Savior, which was released on 22 August 2025. It is their third and last album from their Reforged album series, in which the band releases double albums of re-recorded material from their Noise Records albums that they are legally unable to re-release in original form. It is also their first album with their new bassist Patrick Opitz. Singles were released for the title track and "Walls of Fire".

== Track listing ==
Disc one
No.	Title	Original album	Length
1.	"Never Say Die"	Dark Assault	5:27
2.	"Eye of the World"	Dark Assault	4:43
3.	"Walls of Fire"	Condition Red	4:18
4.	"Time Will Tell"	Battering Ram	4:07
5.	"Dragons Rising"	Dark Assault	6:34
6.	"Stonecold"	Interlude	4:34
7.	"Machine World"	Battering Ram	6:56
8.	"Stand Against the King"	Battering Ram	5:01
9.	"Break It Up"	Iron Savior	5:08
Total length:			46:48

Disc two
No.	Title	Original album	Length
1.	"Contortions of Time"	Interlude	6:06
2.	"Wings of Deliverance"	Battering Ram	4:50
3.	"Touching the Rainbow"	Interlude	5:29
4.	"I Will Be There"	Condition Red	5:53
5.	"Forevermore"	Unification	5:14
6.	"H.M. Powered Man"	Battering Ram	4:19
7.	"Starbreaker" (Judas Priest cover)		4:34
Total length:			36:25

== Personnel ==
Iron Savior

- Piet Sielck – lead vocals, guitars
- Joachim "Piesel" Küstner – guitars, backing vocals
- Patrick Opitz – bass, backing vocals
- Patrick Klose – drums

Additional personnel

- Ingo Spörl – cover artwork, layout
