= Reforged – Ironbound =

Studio album by Iron Savior
- Released: 26 August 2022
- Recorded: 2021–2022
- Studio: Powerhouse Studio, Hamburg, Germany
- Genre: Heavy metal, power metal, speed metal
- Length: 119:20
- Label: AFM
- Producer: Piet Sielck

Iron Savior chronology
| Skycrest (2020) | Reforged – Ironbound (2022) | Firestar (2023) |

Professional ratings
Review scores
| Source | Rating |
|---|---|
| Knac.com | 5/5 |
| Metalfan.nl | 7/10 |
| Sonic Perspectives | 9.5/10 |

Reforged – Ironbound is the thirteenth studio album by German power metal band Iron Savior, which was released on 26 August 2022. It is their second album from their Reforged album series, in which the band releases double albums of re-recorded material from their Noise Records albums that they are legally unable to re-release in original form.

== Track listing ==
Disc one
| No. | Title | Original album | Length |
|---|---|---|---|
| 1. | "Children of the Wasteland" | Iron Savior | 4:50 |
| 2. | "Protect the Law" | Iron Savior | 4:17 |
| 3. | "Starborn" | Unification | 4:38 |
| 4. | "Deadly Sleep" | Unification | 5:12 |
| 5. | "Forces of Rage" | Unification | 5:48 |
| 6. | "Brothers (of the Past)" | Unification | 4:42 |
| 7. | "The Battle" | Unification | 5:49 |
| 8. | "Unchained" | Unification | 6:10 |
| 9. | "Seek and Destroy" | Dark Assault | 3:46 |
| 10. | "Solar Wings" | Dark Assault | 4:34 |
| 11. | "Made of Metal" | Dark Assault | 6:56 |
| 12. | "Predators" | Dark Assault | 3:54 |
| 13. | "Firing the Guns" | Dark Assault | 4:45 |
| 14. | "Back into the Light" | Dark Assault | 5:51 |
| Total length: | | | 71:12 |

Disc two
| No. | Title | Original album | Length |
|---|---|---|---|
| 1. | "Ironbound" | Condition Red | 5:24 |
| 2. | "Paradise" | Condition Red | 5:50 |
| 3. | "Thunderbird" | Condition Red | 7:20 |
| 4. | "Tyranny of Steel" | Battering Ram | 4:15 |
| 5. | "Riding Free" | Battering Ram | 5:17 |
| 6. | "Starchaser" | Battering Ram | 4:29 |
| 7. | "Living on a Fault Line" | Battering Ram | 4:37 |
| 8. | "Crazy" (Seal cover) | Condition Red | 5:06 |
| 9. | "Sweet Dreams (Are Made of This)" (Eurythmics cover) | | 4:19 |
| Total length: | | | 48:08 |

Bonus track
| No. | Title | Length |
|---|---|---|
| 10. | "Crazy" (Seal cover) (radio edit) | 5:07 |
| Total length: | | 52:08 |

== Personnel ==
Iron Savior

- Piet Sielck – lead vocals, guitars
- Joachim "Piesel" Küstner – guitars, backing vocals
- Jan-Sören Eckert – bass, additional lead vocals
- Patrick Klose – drums

Guests in disc 1

- Kai Hansen – additional guitars on track 2, 6, 7, and 10, additional vocals on tracks 4 and 10
- Tim Hansen (Kai's son) – additional guitars on track 4

Additional personnel

- Felipe Machado Franco – cover artwork
- Hiko – design, layout
