= Reforged – Riding on Fire =

Studio album by Iron Savior
- Released: 22 November 2017 (Japan); 8 December 2017 (Europe)
- Recorded: June – August 2017 at Powerhouse Studio, Hamburg, Germany
- Genre: Power metal, heavy metal
- Length: 92:24; 97:31 (Japan)
- Label: AFM, Avalon

Iron Savior chronology
| Titancraft (2016) | Reforged – Riding on Fire (2017) | Kill or Get Killed (2019) |

Reforged – Riding on Fire is the tenth studio album by German heavy/power metal band Iron Savior, which was released on 22 November 2017 in Japan and on 8 December 2017 in Europe as a 2-CD package. The album consists of re-recorded material of the most popular and best songs which dates from the band's 1997 self-titled debut album up until 2004's Battering Ram, when they were signed to Noise Records. It is also the first album to feature new drummer Patrick Klose since he joined in early 2017. The first track "Riding on Fire" was made available for streaming on 2 November 2017 prior of the album's release, followed by "Battering Ram" on 7 December 2017.

== Information ==
Piet Sielck explains that the early albums could not be re-released for legal reasons but is free to re-record them. He says, "Although we can not re-publish our works from the Noise Records time in the original form, we can re-import them very well. We made use of this possibility and approached the old numbers with much enthusiasm."

== Track listing ==
Disc one
| No. | Title | Original album | Length |
|---|---|---|---|
| 1. | "Riding on Fire" | Iron Savior | 4:56 |
| 2. | "Battering Ram" | Battering Ram | 4:52 |
| 3. | "Brave New World" | Iron Savior | 4:34 |
| 4. | "Prisoner of the Void" | Unification | 4:45 |
| 5. | "Titans of our Time" | Condition Red | 3:57 |
| 6. | "Eye to Eye" | Unification | 5:59 |
| 7. | "For the World" | Iron Savior | 5:27 |
| 8. | "Mindfeeder" | Condition Red | 4:47 |
| 9. | "Watcher in the Sky" | Iron Savior | 5:28 |
| 10. | "Mind over Matter" | Unification | 5:37 |
| Total length: | | | 50:22 |

Disc two
| No. | Title | Original album | Length |
|---|---|---|---|
| 1. | "Warrior" | Condition Red | 4:50 |
| 2. | "Iron Savior" | Iron Savior | 4:28 |
| 3. | "Tales of the Bold" | Condition Red | 5:32 |
| 4. | "No Heroes" | Condition Red | 4:15 |
| 5. | "Break the Curse" | Battering Ram | 4:39 |
| 6. | "Condition Red" | Condition Red | 4:59 |
| 7. | "Protector" | Condition Red | 4:37 |
| 8. | "I've Been to Hell" | Dark Assault | 4:06 |
| 9. | "Atlantis Falling" | Iron Savior | 4:36 |
| Total length: | | | 42:02 |

Japanese Bonus Track
| No. | Title | Original album | Length |
|---|---|---|---|
| 10. | "Coming Home" | Unification | 5:07 |
| Total length: | | | 47:09 |

== Personnel ==
Iron Savior

- Piet Sielck – vocals, guitars
- Joachim "Piesel" Küstner – guitars, backing vocals
- Jan-Sören Eckert – bass, backing vocals
- Patrick Klose – drums

Additional personnel

- Felipe Machado Franco – cover artwork
