= Persuader (band) =

Swedish power metal band

- Origin: Umeå, Sweden
- Genres: Power metal
- Years active: 1997–present
- Labels: Dockyard 1, Inner Wound Recordings, Loud 'n' Proud, Noise Records
- Members: Jens Carlsson; Emil Norberg; Alex Friberg; Efraim Juntunen
- Past members: Pekka Kiviaho; Daniel Sundbom; Fredrik Mannberg; Fredrik Hedström

Persuader is a Swedish power metal band from Umeå in the Swedish province of Västerbotten Norrland. The band was formed in 1997, and they have since released five full-length albums. They have a sound similar to bands including early Blind Guardian, Iron Savior, and Nocturnal Rites, although Persuader includes influences of thrash metal also. Members Jens and Emil joined the band Savage Circus in 2005, started by Thomen Stauch before leaving Blind Guardian.

The band's most recent studio album, Necromancy, was released in 2020.

== History ==
=== Formation and The Hunter (1997–2000) ===
Persuader was formed in August 1997 by friends Pekka Kiviaho and David (full name unknown). Jens Carlsson and Efraim Juntunen joined shortly thereafter. Fredrik Hedström was eventually recruited on bass, who had played with Pekka in a band named Shallow. In January 1998, David left the band due to musical differences. In November 1998, the band released a demo titled Visions and Dreams, which was recorded at Garageland Studios. The band was signed to Loud 'n' Proud (LNP) records, a Swedish metal label.

The band's debut studio album, The Hunter, was released on 16 July 2000.

=== Evolution Purgatory and When Eden Burns (2001–2006) ===
The band's label, Loud 'n' Proud, went out of business leaving them without proper label support. In early 2001, guitarist Pekka Kiviaho left the band and they broke up for brief period of time. According to Jens, the band "needed a pause to find a new guitarist and a new label" and "would never cancel Persuader." The band reformed in the spring/summer of 2001 with the addition of new guitarist Emil Norberg, who attended the same school as Jens.

The band started working on their next studio album, and submitted a demo of their unsigned music to Noise Record's Young Metal Gods contest. They won, and released Evolution Purgatory through Noise Records on 2 February 2004. After the release of the album, Jens and Emil became involved with Savage Circus, releasing their debut album Dreamland Manor in 2005. Jens also became involved with New Jersey–based Dark Empire, after being asked by Matt Moliti to contribute vocals to their 2006 debut Distant Tides.

The band released their third studio album, When Eden Burns, on 15 May 2006.

=== The Fiction Maze (2007–2014) ===
Persuader had been at work on their next studio album for several years since the release of When Eden Burns. The album experienced multiple delays due to various reasons. In addition, band members have contributed to their side projects during this time including, in 2008, Dark Empire's Humanity Dethroned and, in 2009, Savage Circus's Of Doom and Death.

In updates, the band humorously refers to their recording location as Studio Värdelös. The Swedish word värdelös translates to "useless" in English. On 12 December 2010, the band revealed the tentative title of the album as The Fiction Maze. Throughout 2011–2013, the band issued intermittent updates on the progress of the album. On 11 September 2013, the band announced they had signed with Inner Wound Recordings.

The Fiction Maze was released late December in Japan and early January in North America and Europe.

=== Departures of two members and Necromancy (since 2016) ===
On 26 October 2016, rhythm guitarist Daniel Sundbom left the band and Fredrik Mannberg took his place; on 2 February 2019 bassist Fredrik Hedström left the band.

In October 2020, the band released a new single, their first in six years, from the upcoming album Necromancy, which was released on 4 December 2020. Guitarist Emil Norberg also commented, "This release will mark the beginning of a new chapter for us and we look forward to working together for many more albums in the future,"

On 17 January 2021, rhythm guitarist Fredrik Mannberg left the band and they welcome new bassist Alex Friberg.

In March 2022, the band released a statement indicating an indefinite hiatus citing a lack of passion to record a follow-up to 2020's Necromancy, stating "We will surely all remain in the metal scene in one way or another".

== Band members ==
Current members

- Jens Carlsson – vocals (since 1997), rhythm guitar (1997–2006)
- Emil Norberg – lead guitar (since 2001), rhythm guitar (since 2021), bass (2019–2021)
- Alex Friberg – bass (since 2021)
- Efraim Juntunen – drums (since 1997)

Former members

- Pekka Kiviaho – lead guitar (1997–2001)
- Daniel Sundbom – rhythm guitar (2006–2016)
- Fredrik Mannberg – rhythm guitar (2016–2021)
- Fredrik Hedström – bass (1997–2019)

== Discography ==
- The Hunter (2000)
- Evolution Purgatory (2004)
- When Eden Burns (2006)
- The Fiction Maze (2014)
- Necromancy (2020)
