= Blind Guardian discography =

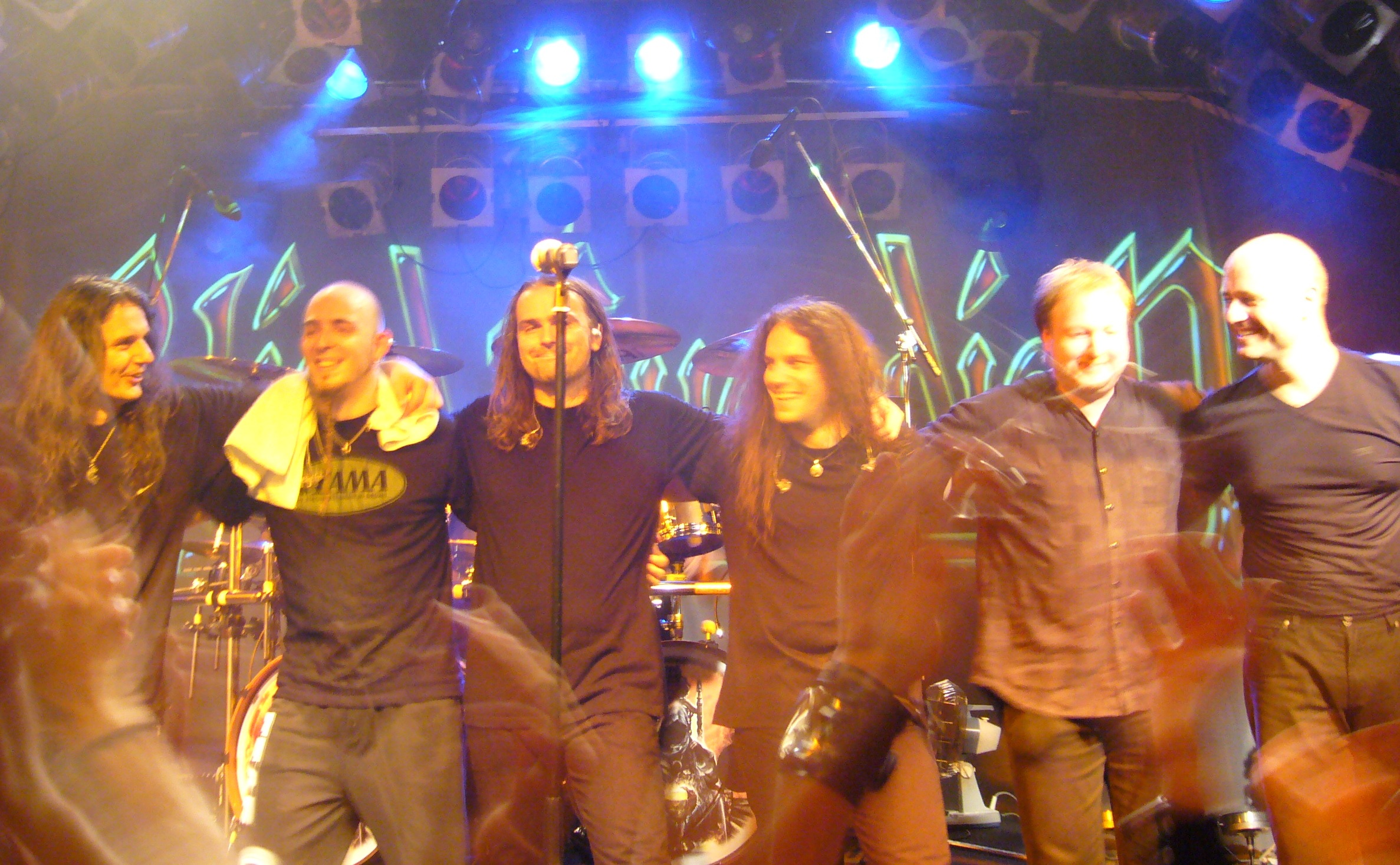
- Blind Guardian in 2006; L-R: Olbrich, Ehmke, Kürsch, Siepen, Schüren, Holzwarth
- Studio albums: 12
- Live albums: 3
- Compilation albums: 2
- Singles: 9
- Video albums: 1
- Music videos: 8
- Box sets: 1

This is the discography of German power metal band Blind Guardian.

== Albums ==
=== Studio albums ===
List of studio albums, with selected chart positions, sales figures and certifications
Title	Album details	Peak chart positions									
Title	Album details	GER	AUT	FIN	FRA	ITA	JPN	SWE	SWI	UK	US
Battalions of Fear	Released: 17 May 1988; Label: No Remorse/Virgin/Century Media	53	—	—	—	—	—	—	—	—	—
Follow the Blind	Released: 14 April 1989; Label: No Remorse/Virgin Records/Century Media	51	—	—	—	—	—	—	—	—	—
Tales from the Twilight World	Released: 2 October 1990; Label: No Remorse/Virgin/Century Media	43	—	—	—	—	40	—	—	—	—
Somewhere Far Beyond	Released: 30 June 1992; Label: Virgin/Century Media	14	49	—	—	—	15	—	—	—	—
Imaginations from the Other Side	Released: 4 April 1995; Label: Virgin/Century Media	21	—	—	—	—	11	—	33	—	—
Nightfall in Middle-Earth	Released: 28 April 1998; Label: Virgin/Century Media	7	39	—	—	—	12	44	—	—	—
A Night at the Opera	Released: 25 March 2002; Label: Virgin/Century Media	5	17	—	67	11	29	10	44	—	—
A Twist in the Myth	Released: 1 September 2006; Label: Nuclear Blast	4	19	30	87	16	21	10	27	—	—
At the Edge of Time	Released: 29 July 2010; Label: Nuclear Blast	2	9	18	48	19	29	22	14	197	108
Beyond the Red Mirror	Released: 30 January 2015; Label: Nuclear Blast	4	8	14	57	36	45	34	10	54	132
Twilight Orchestra: Legacy of the Dark Lands	Released: 8 November 2019; Label: Nuclear Blast	7	22	—	174	49	114	—	24	—	—
The God Machine	Released: 2 September 2022; Label: Nuclear Blast	2	6	5	19	—	53	42	57	—	—
"-" denotes a recording that did not chart or was not released in that territory.

=== Live albums ===
Year	Title	Label	Peak chart positions			
Year	Title	Label	GER	FRA	ITA	JPN
1993	Tokyo Tales	Virgin Records	—	—	—	59
2003	Live	Virgin Records/Century Media	16	136	48	115
2017	Live Beyond the Spheres	Nuclear Blast	9	—	—	—
2020	Imaginations from the Other Side Live	Nuclear Blast	—	—	—	—
"-" denotes a recording that did not chart or was not released in that territory.

=== Compilation albums ===
Year	Title	Label	Peak chart positions		
Year	Title	Label	GER	FIN	JPN
1996	The Forgotten Tales	Virgin	36	—	41
2012	Memories of a Time to Come	Virgin	6	45	—
2013	A Traveler's Guide to Space and Time	Virgin	—	—	—
"-" denotes a recording that did not chart or was not released in that territory.

=== Demo albums ===
Year	Title
1985	Symphonies of Doom
1986	Battalions of Fear

=== Tribute albums ===
Year	Title
2003	Tales from the Underworld

== Singles ==
Year	Title	Label	Peak chart positions							
Year	Title	Label	GER	AUT	HUN	ITA	JPN	SPA	SWE	SWI
1989	"Banish from Sanctuary"	No Remorse Records	—	—	—	—	—	—	—	—
1995	"A Past and Future Secret"	Virgin Records	—	—	—	—	—	—	—	—
1995	"Bright Eyes"	Victor Entertainment	—	—	—	—	—	—	—	—
1996	"Mr. Sandman"	Virgin Records	—	—	—	—	—	—	—	—
1998	"Mirror Mirror"	Virgin Records	42	—	—	—	—	—	—	—
2001	"And Then There Was Silence"	Virgin Records	41	—	—	—	82	1	41	—
2003	"The Bard's Song (In the Forest)"	Virgin Records	40	—	—	31	—	—	—	—
2006	"Fly"	Nuclear Blast	32	52	4	42	178	4	29	94
2007	"Another Stranger Me"	Nuclear Blast	79	—	—	47	—	—	—	—
2010	"A Voice in the Dark"	Nuclear Blast	62	—	—	—	—	—	—	—
2014	"Twilight of the Gods"	Nuclear Blast	—	—	—	—	—	—	—	—
2020	"Violent Shadows" (live)	Nuclear Blast	—	—	—	—	—	—	—	—
2020	"Merry Xmas Everybody"	Nuclear Blast	—	—	—	—	—	—	—	—
2021	"Deliver Us from Evil"	Nuclear Blast	—	—	—	—	—	—	—	—
2022	"Secrets of the American Gods"	Nuclear Blast	—	—	—	—	—	—	—	—
2022	"Blood of the Elves"	Nuclear Blast	—	—	—	—	—	—	—	—
2022	"Violent Shadows"	Nuclear Blast	—	—	—	—	—	—	—	—
"—" denotes a recording that did not chart or was not released in that territory.

== Other appearances ==
Year	Title	Label
1999	"Don't Talk to Strangers" from Holy Dio: Tribute to Ronnie James Dio	Century Media
2018	The Tides of War – Live at Rock Hard Festival 2016	RockHard

== Videography ==
=== DVDs ===
Year	Title	Label	Chart positions	Certification
2004	Imaginations Through the Looking Glass	Virgin Records/Capitol Records	Finland: #7	GER: Gold

=== Music videos ===
Year	Song	Director	Notes
1995	"Born in a Mourning Hall"		Live video
1995	"Bright Eyes"		
1996	"Mr. Sandman"		The Chordettes cover
1998	"Mirror Mirror"		
2003	"The Bard's Song (In the Forest)"		
2006	"Another Stranger Me"	Ivan Colic	
2008	"Sacred Worlds"	Ascaron	Animated video, included in Sacred 2 Fallen Angel video game
2010	"A Voice in the Dark"		
2014	"Twilight of the Gods"		
2016	"Children of the Smith"		
2019	"Point of No Return"		
2019	"This Storm"		
2019	"War Feeds War"		
2020	"Merry Xmas Everybody"		Slade cover
2022	"Deliver Us from Evil"		
2022	"Secrets of the American Gods"		
2022	"Blood of the Elves"		
2022	"Violent Shadows"		
2022	"Architects of Doom"		
2022	"Life Beyond the Spheres"		
