= Megatropolis =

Studio album by Iron Savior
- Released: 4 June 2007
- Recorded: January – February 2007 at Powerhouse Studio, Hamburg, Germany; HammerMusic, Brackel, Germany
- Genre: Power metal, heavy metal
- Label: Dockyard 1
- Producer: Piet Sielck

Iron Savior chronology
Battering Ram (2004)	Megatropolis (2007)	The Landing (2011)

Professional ratings
Review scores
Source	Rating
Metal Temple	8/10 stars
Deep Ground	(2.0. DE)

Megatropolis is Iron Savior's sixth full-length album, released on June 4, 2007. It was recorded, mixed and engineered at Powerhouse Studios in Hamburg in February 2007 with the drums being recorded at HammerMusic in January 2007. The album was re-released in 2015 as Megatropolis 2.0 with partly re-recorded vocal tracks, new mixed sound and a different track listing, as the band was dissatisfied with the original product. It is the last album to feature Yenz Leonhardt on bass, who would then join Stormwarrior shortly that year.

This album is dedicated to Piet Sielck's late brother Tim, who died in November 2005.

== Background ==
In a descriptive detail regarding the 2015 re-release of Megatropolis, Piet Sielck explains:

"AFM has informed me that our "Megatropolis" album is sold out, so the idea came up to rework the material and release a new edition. Being unhappy with the album for a long time, I am absolutely delighted to get a chance to correct my errors. The new mix will carry all Iron Savior trademarks such as big choir backings and lots of multi timbral vocals. I left all these goodies out at the time to make the album more distinguishable from my former second band Savage Circus... a fatal error, which I finally can correct now."

== Track listing ==
All tracks are written by Piet Sielck except where noted

No.	Title	Length
1.	"Running Riot"	4:58
2.	"The Omega Man"	4:52
3.	"Flesh"	5:01
4.	"Megatropolis"	5:04
5.	"Cybernetic Queen"	4:52
6.	"Cyber Hero"	4:59
7.	"A Tale from Down Below"	5:18
8.	"Still I Believe"	4:35
9.	"Farewell And Goodbye"	5:33
Total length:		45:29

Limited Edition Bonus Track
No.	Title	Writer(s)	Length
1.	"Hammerdown"	Joachim Küstner, Yenz Leonhardt	4:00
Total length:			49:29

Japanese Bonus Tracks
No.	Title	Writer(s)	Length
1.	"Hammerdown"	Küstner, Leonhardt	4:00
2.	"Iron Watcher"	Sielck, Kai Hansen	4:43
Total length:			54:12

=== Megatropolis 2.0 track listing ===
No.	Title	Length
1.	"The Omega Man"	4:48
2.	"Megatropolis"	5:01
3.	"Flesh"	4:56
4.	"Cybernatic Queen"	4:56
5.	"Running Riot"	4:56
6.	"Cyber Hero"	4:55
7.	"A Tale from Down Below"	4:57
8.	"Still I Believe"	4:34
9.	"Hammerdown"	3:59
10.	"Farewell and Goodbye"	5:53
11.	"Iron Watcher"	4:41
Total length:		53:56

== Notes ==
- "Iron Watcher" is a medley of the songs "Iron Savior" and "Watcher in the Sky" from the band's 1997 debut album Iron Savior.
- "The Omega Man" and "Cybernetic Queen" were mistakenly misspelled as "The Omega Men" and "Cybernatic Queen" on the original back cover track listing but was fixed on the 2015 re-release with the latter still maintaining its name

== Personnel ==
- Piet Sielck – lead vocals, guitar
- Joachim "Piesel" Küstner – guitar, backing vocals
- Yenz Leonhardt – bass, backing vocals
- Thomas Nack – drums and miscellaneous percussion
