= Coming Home (EP) =

EP by Iron Savior
- Released: July 24, 1998
- Recorded: June 1998
- Studio: Powerhouse Studio and Karo Studio Brackel, Germany
- Genre: Power metal, heavy metal
- Length: 20:30
- Label: Noise
- Producer: Piet Sielck

Iron Savior chronology
Iron Savior (1997)	Coming Home (1998)	Unification (1999)

Coming Home is the first EP by German heavy metal band, Iron Savior. It was published as an EP on 14 July 1998 for the European market by Noise Records, and on October 14 of that year as a single for the Japanese market by Victor.

== Story ==
Taken from the liner notes in the CD release.

=== Prologue ===
It is the year 2110. For about two years now Earth has been threatened by war. Almost the entire planet is controlled by the lifeless invasion troops of the Iron Savior. Only a small group of people managed to hide in the former Earth Defence Headquarters located under the everlasting ice of Greenland. This cell of resistance feverishly researches everything possible to find a way to defeat the merciless machine in orbit. Somehow its origin seems to be linked to the myth of Atlantis…

Meanwhile on the distant planet of Caldaris a deep space signal of the Iron Savior was received. The Caldarins – who are the heirs of Atlantis – left the dying Earth just before it was destroyed and after decades in space finally founded a new civilisation – the world of Caldaris. This all happened 300,000 years ago and during the millennia the Caldarins forgot about their origins. Only myths and legends give evidence of the lost kingdom. Thousands of expeditions returned to Caldaris from their quest of the old world without a clue.

But now the transmission of the Iron Savior in the language of the old give the Caldarins the most precise hint throughout their entire history. A huge fleet is leaving Caldaris to investigate the source of the transmission…

Maybe this time their quest will end and the Caldarins are coming home...

== Track listing ==
All tracks are written by Piet Sielck, except where noted.

No.	Title	Length
1.	"Coming Home"	5:22
2.	"Forces of Rage (Single version)"	5:47
3.	"Atlantis Falling" (recorded live during 'Atlantis Falling' Europe Tour)	4:29
4.	"The Rage" (written by Halford, Tripton, Downing)	4:52

== Personnel ==
Iron Savior

- Piet Sielck – vocals, guitar, production
- Kai Hansen – guitar, vocals, additional production
- Jan Soren Eckert – bass, backing vocals
- Andreas Kück – keyboards, backing vocals
- Dan Zimmerman – drums
