= The Fiction Maze =

Studio album by Persuader
- Released: 25 December 2013 (JP); 17 January 2014 (EU); 21 January 2014 (US)
- Recorded: Garageland Studios, Umeå (rhythm guitars, mixing)
- Genre: Power metal
- Length: 52:43
- Label: Inner Wound Recordings

Persuader chronology
When Eden Burns (2006)	The Fiction Maze (2013)	Necromancy (2020)

Professional ratings
Review scores
Source	Rating
Metal Temple	8/10 stars
The Monolith	9/10 stars
Sputnikmusic	3.5/5 stars
Sound Scape	10/10 stars
Hollywood Metal	8/10 stars
Hard Rock Heaven	8/10 stars
Powermetal.de	8.5/10 stars

The Fiction Maze is the fourth studio album by Swedish power metal band Persuader. The band describes the album as "the perfect mix of everything we've done so far, expanded on the Persuader sound while keeping the core that is the band" and "a beast of an album, the true pinnacle of our career so far." In an interview with Swedish newspaper Västerbottens-Kuriren, Emil noted that the album is "a little more aggressive and a little heavier" than their previous work. The album is Persuader's first release in seven years.

On 11 September 2013, Persuader announced they had signed with Inner Wound Recordings.

== Background ==
The album experienced multiple delays in its recording and anticipated release date. The band had been working on the album since at least May 2008, and cites personal lives and work with Savage Circus and other projects, as factors in the repeated delays.

In an interview with HighWire Daze, Efraim explains the theme behind the album:

The maze idea can be applied to most of the lyrics, but it's not necessary a concept album. The idea is that finding the real truth in things, whether it's in religion, the news on TV or your own mindset can be like finding your way through a labyrinth.

== Recording ==
According to Persuader's studio blog, the album has been recorded in multiple locations, one of which was described as "an old haunted house just by the shore of the mighty Kvarken... It's cold, dark and pretty filthy so the ambience for the new album is set."

On the band's previous two albums, Piet Sielck of Iron Savior contributed backing vocals. For this album however, the band decided to have Emil and Efraim do the backing vocals. The result, according to the band, is a rawer sound compared to their previous two records. Previews were released on the band's studio diary. "Son of Sodom's" working title was "Behemoth", and is a heavier track. "Deep In the Dark" shows "a bit softer and atmospheric side of Persuader."

== Track listing ==
No.	Title	Length
1.	"One Lifetime"	4:26
2.	"War"	4:24
3.	"The Fiction Maze"	5:08
4.	"Deep in the Dark"	5:31
5.	"InSect"	4:05
6.	"Son of Sodom"	5:48
7.	"Sent to the Grave"	4:58
8.	"Heathen"	6:15
9.	"Dagon Rising"	1:27
10.	"Worlds Collide"	5:30
11.	"Falling Faster"	5:11

Japanese edition bonus track
No.	Title	Length
12.	"Aftermath"	4:04

== Personnel ==
Persuader

- Jens Carlsson – vocals
- Emil Norberg – lead guitar
- Daniel Sundbom – rhythm guitar
- Fredrik Hedström – bass
- Efraim Juntunen – drums

Production

- Ronnie Björnström – mixing and mastering
- Felipe Machado Franco – artwork
