= Live at the Final Frontier =

Live album by Iron Savior
- Released: 29 May 2015
- Recorded: 10 January 2015
- Venue: Knust Music Club (St. Pauli, Germany)
- Genre: Power metal, heavy metal
- Length: 84:39 (CD); 81:29 (DVD)
- Label: AFM

Professional ratings
Review scores
Source	Rating
Metal Temple	9/10 stars
New Noise Magazine	8.5/10 stars

Live at the Final Frontier is the debut live album by German heavy metal band Iron Savior, released on 29 May 2015 via AFM Records. It was recorded live in Hamburg, Germany on 10 January 2015 during their tour of Rise of the Hero. It contains two CDs and a DVD featuring the band's performance plus bonus video material and additional backstage and concert footage.

== CD track Listing ==
All lyrics are written by Piet Sielck except where noted

Disc 1
No.	Title	Length
1.	"Ascendence" (Intro)	1:32
2.	"Last Hero"	5:07
3.	"Starlight"	5:09
4.	"The Savior"	5:03
5.	"Revenge of the Bride"	4:50
6.	"Break the Curse"	6:06
7.	"Burning Heart"	4:48
8.	"Mind Over Matter"	5:50

Disc 2
No.	Title	Writer(s)	Length
1.	"Hall of the Heroes"		5:48
2.	"R U Ready"		4:57
3.	"Condition Red"		5:12
4.	"I've Been to Hell"		4:21
5.	"Heavy Metal Never Dies"		6:45
6.	"Coming Home"		5:37
7.	"Iron Watcher"	Sielck, Kai Hansen	5:15
8.	"Atlantis Falling"		5:30
9.	"Breaking the Law" (Judas Priest cover)	Glenn Tipton, Rob Halford, K.K. Downing	2:49

Japanese edition bonus tracks
No.	Title	Length
1.	"The Omega Man" (Taken from Megatropolis 2.0)	4:50
2.	"Megatropolis" (Taken from Megatropolis 2.0)	5:02

== DVD track Listing ==
No.	Title	Writer(s)	Length
1.	"Ascendence" (Intro)		1:28
2.	"Last Hero"		5:00
3.	"Starlight"		4:51
4.	"The Savior"		4:48
5.	"Revenge of the Bride"		4:35
6.	"Break the Curse"		4:01
7.	"Burning Heart"		4:39
8.	"Mind Over Matter"		5:35
9.	"Hall of the Heroes"		5:39
10.	"R U Ready"		4:49
11.	"Condition Red"		4:58
12.	"I've Been to Hell"		4:04
13.	"Heavy Metal Never Dies"		4:14
14.	"Coming Home"		5:23
15.	"Iron Watcher"	Sielck, Hansen	10:13
16.	"Atlantis Falling"		4:34
17.	"Breaking the Law" (Judas Priest cover)	Tipton, Halford, Downing	2:38

== Credits ==
Iron Savior

- Piet Sielck – vocals, guitars
- Joachim "Piesel" Küstner – guitars
- Jan-Sören Eckert – bass, additional vocals
- Thomas Nack – drums

Additional personnel

- Felipe Machado Franco – cover art
