= Thomen Stauch =

German drummer (born 1970)

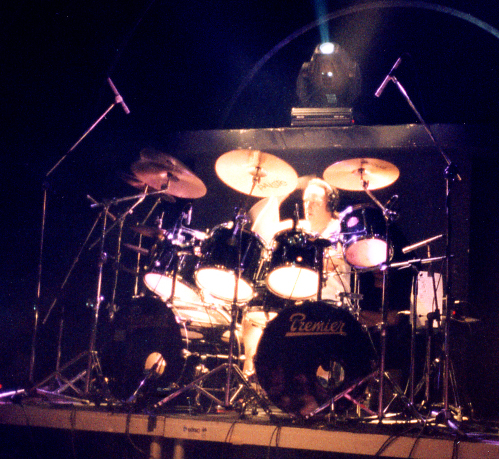
- Stauch on stage (2003)

Background information
- Also known as: The Omen
- Born: Thomas Stauch; 11 March 1970 (age 55); Krefeld, West Germany
- Genres: Heavy metal; Power metal
- Occupation: Drummer
- Years active: 1985–present
- Member of: Savage Circus; Coldseed
- Formerly of: Blind Guardian; Iron Savior; Serious Black

Thomas "Thomen" Stauch (born 11 March 1970), also known by his nickname The Omen, is a German heavy metal drummer, best known as the co-founder and former drummer of Blind Guardian.

== Biography ==
He began his career in 1984 with the band Lucifer’s Heritage, performing drums on their 1985 demo, Symphonies of Doom. After changes in the lineup, the band renamed itself Blind Guardian in 1987.

Stauch left Blind Guardian in April 2005, citing dissatisfaction with the direction the band had taken in its later years. His final releases with the band were the 2002 studio album A Night at the Opera and the live album Imaginations Through the Looking Glass.

In 2004, while still with Blind Guardian, he formed Savage Circus with friend Piet Sielck. Piet introduced him to Persuader vocalist Jens Carlsson and guitarist Emil Norberg, who completed the band's lineup. They released their debut album Dreamland Manor in August 2005. Due to health issues that caused him to miss too many gigs, Thomen left the band on 17 August 2007 but rejoined the lineup in 2012. Stauch has also contributed to other projects, including Iron Savior and Serious Black.

Stauch joined the band Seelenzorn in September 2008. He has also played drums for the band Coldseed alongside Soilwork frontman Björn Strid.

Stauch is recognized for his fast and technical drumming, particularly on the Blind Guardian album A Night at the Opera, where he combines the traditional intensity and speed of the band's earlier style with new, more technical and progressive elements. He uses Premier Drums, Artisan Turk cymbals, and Vic Firth drumsticks.

== Discography ==
=== Blind Guardian ===
- Battalions of Fear (1988)
- Follow the Blind (1989)
- Tales from the Twilight World (1990)
- Somewhere Far Beyond (1992)
- Tokyo Tales (Live, 1993)
- Imaginations from the Other Side (1995)
- The Forgotten Tales (Compilation, 1996)
- Nightfall in Middle-Earth (1998)
- A Night at the Opera (2002)
- Live (Live, 2003)
- Imaginations Through the Looking Glass (Video, 2004)

=== Iron Savior ===
- Iron Savior (1997)

=== Savage Circus ===
- Dreamland Manor (2005)

=== Coldseed ===
- Completion Makes the Tragedy (2006)

=== Serious Black ===
- As Daylight Breaks (2015)

=== Mentalist ===
- Freedom of Speech (2020)
- A Journey into the Unknown (2021)
- Empires Falling (2022)
- Earthbreaker (2025)
