= Skycrest =

Studio album by Iron Savior
- Released: 4 December 2020
- Recorded: May–October 2020
- Studios: Powerhouse Studio, Hamburg, Germany
- Genres: Heavy metal, power metal
- Length: 56:18
- Label: AFM
- Producer: Piet Sielck

Iron Savior chronology
Kill or Get Killed (2019)	Skycrest (2020)	Reforged – Ironbound (2022)

Singles from Skycrest
- 1. "Our Time Has Come" Released: 19 October 2020; 2. "Souleater" Released: 17 November 2020

Professional ratings
Review scores
Source	Rating
Dead Rhetoric	9/10
Metal Hammer	4.5/7
Metal.de	7/10
Powermetal.de	8/10
Rock Hard	8/10
The Rockpit	8/10
Sonic Perspectives	9.3/10

Skycrest is the twelfth studio album and eleventh original album by German heavy/power metal band Iron Savior, which was released on 4 December 2020. Production was marred by several issues such as bassist Jan-Soren Eckert having been diagnosed with cancer, from which he fully recovered, and the coronavirus pandemic.

Norway's Scream Magazine gave a 4 out of 6 score to Skycrest. It was almost "inconceiveable" that every album could be good while also being made out of the same blueprint every time. "When they go along with the title track here, I instantly get the feeling that this is one of the best songs they have ever made. Still, it sounds like almost everything they have done previously". The reviewer preferred Iron Savior's "full throttle" power metal to their "mid-tempo stuff".

== Track listing ==
Skycrest track listing
No.	Title	Length
1.	"The Guardian"	1:17
2.	"Skycrest"	4:29
3.	"Our Time Has Come"	4:48
4.	"Hellbreaker"	5:34
5.	"Souleater"	4:56
6.	"Welcome to the New World"	4:29
7.	"There Can Be Only One"	4:11
8.	"Silver Bullet"	6:24
9.	"Raise the Flag" (bonus track)	4:35
10.	"End of the Rainbow"	5:20
11.	"Ease Your Pain"	5:45
12.	"Ode to the Brave"	4:30
Total length:		56:18

== Personnel ==
Iron Savior

- Piet Sielck – lead vocals, guitars
- Joachim "Piesel" Küstner – guitars, backing vocals
- Jan-Sören Eckert – bass, lead vocals on track 11
- Patrick Klose – drums

Additional personnel

- Daniel "DannyDanger" Galmarini – orchestrations on track 11
- Felipe Machado Franco – cover artwork
- Thomas Sprenger – photography
