= Firestar (album) =

Studio album by Iron Savior
- Released: 6 October 2023
- Recorded: October 2022 – April 2023
- Studio: Powerhouse Studio, Hamburg, Germany
- Genre: Power metal, heavy metal
- Length: 53:44
- Label: AFM
- Producer: Piet Sielck

Iron Savior chronology
Reforged – Ironbound (2022)	Firestar (2023)	Reforged – Machine World (2025)

Professional ratings
Review scores
Source	Rating
Dead Rhetoric	9.5/10
The Metal Pit	8.5/10
Metal-Roos	4/5

Firestar is the fourteenth studio album and twelfth original album by German power metal band Iron Savior, which was released on 6 October 2023. It is their last album with longtime bassist/co-lead vocalist Jan-Sören Eckert. Music videos were released for the title track and "In the Realm of Heavy Metal".

== Track listing ==
Firestar track listing (Note: Source does not include track lengths, only track names.)
No.	Title	Length
1.	"The Titan"	1:12
2.	"Curse of the Machinery"	5:40
3.	"In the Realm of Heavy Metal"	4:27
4.	"Demise of the Tyrant"	4:19
5.	"Firestar"	5:03
6.	"Through the Fires of Hell"	5:01
7.	"Mask, Cloak and Sword"	3:58
8.	"Across the Wastelands"	4:56
9.	"Rising from Ashes"	5:41
10.	"Nothing Is Forever"	4:45
11.	"Together as One"	5:01
Total length:		50:03

Bonus track
No.	Title	Length
12.	"Heading Out to the Highway" (Judas Priest cover)	3:41
Total length:		53:44

== Personnel ==
Iron Savior

- Piet Sielck – lead vocals, guitars
- Joachim "Piesel" Küstner – guitars, additional lead vocals
- Jan-Sören Eckert – bass, additional lead vocals
- Patrick Klose – drums

Guests

- Frida Sielck – backing vocals
- Matheo Lück – backing vocals

Additional personnel

- Felipe Machado Franco – cover artwork
- Thomas Sprenger – photography
- Hiko – design, layout
