= Coldseed =

Multinational heavy metal band

- Genres: Groove metal; alternative metal
- Years active: 2004–2006
- Labels: Nuclear Blast
- Members: Björn Strid; Thomen Stauch; Oliver Holzwarth; Michael Schüren; Thorsten Praest; Gonzalo Alfageme López

Coldseed was a multinational heavy metal band led by Swedish vocalist Björn Strid of Soilwork. The five other members were German drummer Thomen Stauch (Savage Circus), his countrymen bassist Oliver Holzwarth (Blind Guardian) and keyboardist Michael Schüren (Blind Guardian), as well as Swedish guitarist Thorsten Praest and Spaniard Gonzalo Alfageme López.

The band was formed as a side project in 2004. They released one album, Completion Makes the Tragedy, via Nuclear Blast in 2006. No further activity was announced from the band since then.

== Musical style ==
Metal.de described the music as a "varied mix of melodic metal and thrash" as well as "modern playing styles in the direction of nu metal or even slight touches of industrial. AllMusic also noted gothic influences.

== Band members ==
- Björn Strid – vocals
- Thorsten Praest – guitar
- Gonzalo Alfageme López – guitar
- Oliver Holzwarth – bass
- Thomen Stauch – drums
- Michael Schüren – keyboards, synthesizers

== Discography ==
- 2006: Completion Makes the Tragedy (Nuclear Blast)
