= Awesome Anthems of the Galaxy =

Studio album of cover songs by Iron Savior
- Released: 27 March 2026
- Recorded: 2025
- Genres: Heavy metal, power metal
- Length: 70:30
- Label: Reigning Phoenix
- Producer: Piet Sielck

Iron Savior chronology
Reforged – Machine World (2025)	Awesome Anthems of the Galaxy (2026)

Singles from Awesome Anthems of the Galaxy
- 1. "Fame" Released: 31 October 2025; 2. "Forever Young" Released: 29 November 2025; 3. "Relax" Released: 11 January 2026; 4. "Take On Me" Released: 14 February 2026; 5. "Maniac" Released: 28 March 2026

Awesome Anthems of the Galaxy is a cover album by German power metal band Iron Savior, which was released on 27 March 2026, consisting of "pop songs that were huge worldwide hits" in the 1970s and 1980s. Singles were released in advance for their covers of "Fame" by Irene Cara, and "Forever Young" by Alphaville, "Relax" by Frankie Goes to Hollywood, and "Take On Me" by a-ha.

== Track listing ==
No.	Title	Original artist (year)	Length
1.	"Fame"	Irene Cara (1980)	4:42
2.	"All I Need Is a Miracle"	Mike and the Mechanics (1986)	4:08
3.	"When the Rain Begins to Fall"	Jermaine Jackson and Pia Zadora (1984)	4:40
4.	"Maniac"	Michael Sembello (1983)	4:26
5.	"Take On Me"	a-ha (1984)	3:53
6.	"Relax"	Frankie Goes to Hollywood (1983)	3:55
7.	"What a Feeling"	Irene Cara (1983)	3:44
8.	"Against All Odds"	Phil Collins (1984)	4:32
9.	"Separate Ways"	Journey (1983)	5:20
10.	"Suburbia"	Pet Shop Boys (1986)	4:08
11.	"Here Comes the Rain Again"	Eurythmics (1984)	4:25
12.	"She's Like the Wind"	Patrick Swayze (1987)	3:34
13.	"(I Just) Died in Your Arms"	Cutting Crew (1986)	4:29
14.	"Forever Young"	Alphaville (1984)	3:37
15.	"Since You Been Gone"	Russ Ballard (1976)	3:14
16.	"Call Me"	Blondie (1980)	3:30
17.	"Catch Me (I'm Falling)"	Pretty Poison (1987)	4:13
Total length:			70:30

== Personnel ==
Iron Savior

- Piet Sielck – vocals, guitars
- Joachim "Piesel" Küstner – guitars
- Patrick Opitz – bass
- Patrick Klose – drums

== Charts ==
Chart performance for Awesome Anthems of the Galaxy
Chart (2026)	Peak position
French Rock & Metal Albums (SNEP)	95
