= Kill or Get Killed =

Studio album by Iron Savior
- Released: 15 March 2019
- Recorded: August–November 2018
- Studio: Powerhouse Studio, Hamburg, Germany
- Genre: Heavy metal, power metal
- Length: 49:38
- Label: AFM
- Producer: Piet Sielck

Iron Savior chronology
Reforged – Riding on Fire (2017)	Kill or Get Killed (2019)	Skycrest (2020)

Professional ratings
Review scores
Source	Rating
Dead Rhetoric	9/10
Sonic Perspectives	9.1/10

Kill or Get Killed is the eleventh studio album and tenth original album by German heavy/power metal band Iron Savior, which was released on 15 March 2019. It is their first original album to feature new drummer Patrick Klose.

== Track listing ==
Kill of Get Killed track listing
No.	Title	Length
1.	"Kill or Get Killed"	5:43
2.	"Roaring Thunder"	4:21
3.	"Eternal Quest"	4:34
4.	"From Dust and Rubble"	4:45
5.	"Sinner or Saint"	4:57
6.	"Stand Up and Fight"	4:22
7.	"Heroes Ascending"	4:15
8.	"Never Stop Believing"	4:12
9.	"Until We Meet Again"	7:52
10.	"Legends of Glory"	4:37
Total length:		49:38

Bonus track
No.	Title	Length
11.	"Sin City" (AC/DC cover)	4:24
Total length:		54:02

== Personnel ==
Iron Savior

- Piet Sielck – lead vocals, guitars
- Joachim "Piesel" Küstner – guitars, backing vocals
- Jan-Sören Eckert – bass, additional lead vocals
- Patrick Klose – drums

Additional personnel

- Felipe Machado Franco – cover artwork
- Thomas Sprenger – photography
