= Holy Dio: Tribute to Ronnie James Dio =

Holy Dio: A Tribute to Ronnie James Dio

Compilation album by various artists
- Released: July 12, 1999
- Recorded: October–December 1998
- Genre: Heavy metal
- Length: 75:07
- Label: Century Media
- Compiler: Götz Kühnemund

Professional ratings
Review scores
Source	Rating
Allmusic	3.5/5 stars

Holy Dio: A Tribute to Ronnie James Dio is a compilation album, released on July 12, 1999. It is a tribute album to Ronnie James Dio, featuring covers of several songs he had sung during his time with Rainbow, Black Sabbath and his own band Dio. The covers done on this tribute album were recorded by mostly power metal bands.

== Track listing ==
1. "Neon Knights" - Steel Prophet
2. "Man on the Silver Mountain" - HammerFall
3. "The Last in Line" - Destiny's End
4. "The Sign of the Southern Cross" - Fates Warning
5. "Long Live Rock 'n' Roll" - Gamma Ray
6. "Egypt (The Chains Are On)" - Doro
7. "Children of the Sea" - Jag Panzer
8. "Don't Talk to Strangers" - Blind Guardian
9. "Still I'm Sad" - Axel Rudi Pell
10. "Kill the King" - Primal Fear
11. "Shame on the Night" - Solitude Aeturnus
12. "Heaven and Hell" - Enola Gay
13. "The Temple of the King" - Angel Dust
14. "Rainbow Eyes" - Catch the Rainbow

=== Two-disc version ===
There is a two-disc version of this album with songs in the following order in the liner notes, although the CDs have the songs in a different order (including the two versions of "Kill the King" being switched):

- Disc one:
1. "Don't Talk to Strangers" - Blind Guardian
2. "Kill the King" - Primal Fear
3. "Egypt (The Chains Are On)" - Doro
4. "Children of the Sea" - Jag Panzer
5. "Sign of the Southern Cross" - Fates Warning
6. "Rainbow Eyes" - Catch the Rainbow
7. "Long Live Rock 'n' Roll" - Gamma Ray
8. "Country Girl" - Dan Swanö/Peter Tägtgren
9. "Gates of Babylon" - Yngwie Malmsteen
- Disc two:
1. "We Rock" - Grave Digger
2. "Man on the Silver Mountain" - HammerFall
3. "Holy Diver" - Holy Mother
4. "Kill the King" - Stratovarius
5. "Still I'm Sad" - Axel Rudi Pell
6. "Heaven and Hell" - Enola Gay
7. "Neon Knights" - Steel Prophet
8. "Shame on the Night" - Solitude Aeturnus
9. "The Last in Line" - Destiny's End
10. "The Temple of the King" - Angel Dust
