= Titancraft =

Studio album by Iron Savior
- Released: 20 May 2016 (Europe); 25 May 2016 (Japan)
- Recorded: September 2015 – February 2016 at Powerhouse Studio, Hamburg, Germany
- Genre: Power metal, heavy metal
- Length: 65:05
- Label: AFM, Avalon

Iron Savior chronology
Rise of the Hero (2014)	Titancraft (2016)	Reforged – Riding on Fire (2017)

Professional ratings
Review scores
Source	Rating
Metal Temple	9/10 stars
Metal Storm	7/10 stars

Titancraft is the ninth studio album by German heavy/power metal band Iron Savior. It was released on 20 May 2016 by AFM Records and on 25 May 2016 by Japanese-based record label Avalon. It was recorded, mixed and mastered at Powerhouse Studio in Hamburg from September 2015 - February 2016 with the bass being recorded at John Zorn MR. It is the last album to feature long time drummer Thomas Nack when he departed the band in 2017.

A music video was made for "Way of the Blade".

== Track listing ==
All music is composed by Iron Savior.

No.	Title	Length
1.	"Under Siege"	0:58
2.	"Titancraft"	5:21
3.	"Way of the Blade"	3:57
4.	"Seize the Day"	5:07
5.	"Gunsmoke"	5:58
6.	"Beyond the Horizon"	5:02
7.	"The Sun Won't Rise in Hell"	5:10
8.	"Strike Down the Tyranny"	5:23
9.	"Brother in Arms"	5:10
10.	"I Surrender"	4:04
11.	"Rebellious"	4:49

Limited Edition bonus tracks
No.	Title	Length
1.	"R&R Addiction"	5:10
2.	"Protector" (Re-recorded 2016)	4:36

Japanese bonus tracks
No.	Title	Length
1.	"R&R Addiction"	5:10
2.	"Protector" (Re-recorded 2016)	4:36
3.	"Assailant" (Re-recorded 2016)	4:20

== Credits ==
- Piet Sielck – vocals, guitars, keyboards
- Joachim "Piesel" Küstner – guitars
- Jan-Sören Eckert – bass
- Thomas Nack – drums

Additional musicians

- Frank Beck – backing vocals
- Pippa Sielck – backing vocals

== Production ==
- Felipe Machado Franco - Cover Art, Artwork, Design

== Charts ==
Chart (2016)	Peak position
German Albums (Offizielle Top 100)	62
Swiss Albums (Schweizer Hitparade)	92
