= Battalions of Fear =

Studio album by Blind Guardian
- Released: 18 May 1988
- Recorded: October–November 1987
- Studios: Karo Studios, Münster, West Germany
- Genres: Speed metal; thrash metal; power metal
- Length: 39:20
- Label: No Remorse
- Producer: Kalle Trapp

Blind Guardian chronology
Battalions of Fear (1988)	Follow the Blind (1989)

Professional ratings
Review scores
Source	Rating
Sputnikmusic	4/5 stars
Metal Storm	8.6/10
Rock Hard	9/10

Battalions of Fear is the debut studio album by the German power metal band Blind Guardian, released in 1988. The album is a raw and unpolished speed metal effort that touches on thrash metal. It lacks many of the stylistic flourishes that would mark the band's music in later years, focusing more on speed and aggression. The opening track "Majesty" remains a fan favorite and is often featured in the band's live performances. This album was remastered, remixed and re-released on 15 June 2007, with the whole first demo tape, Symphonies of Doom, of the band (at the time called Lucifer's Heritage) as part of the bonus tracks. The album was again re-released as part of the A Traveler's Guide to Space and Time boxset with minor adjustments to the mixing and with new mastering.

== Track listing ==
All songs written by André Olbrich and Hansi Kürsch, except where noted. All lyrics written by Kürsch.

Side one
No.	Title	Length
1.	"Majesty"	7:28
2.	"Guardian of the Blind" (André Olbrich, Hansi Kürsch, Marcus Siepen, Thomas Stauch)	5:09
3.	"Trial by the Archon" (instrumental)	1:41
4.	"Wizard's Crown"	3:48

Side two
No.	Title	Length
5.	"Run for the Night"	3:33
6.	"The Martyr"	6:14
7.	"Battalions of Fear"	6:06
8.	"By the Gates of Moria" (instrumental)	2:52

Cassette and CD edition bonus track
No.	Title	Length
9.	"Gandalf's Rebirth" (instrumental)	2:10

2007 re-release bonus tracks
No.	Title	Length
10.	"Brian" (demo version) (André Olbrich, Hansi Kürsch, Markus Dörk)	2:41
11.	"Halloween (The Wizard's Crown)" (demo version)	3:22
12.	"Lucifer's Heritage" (demo version)	4:36
13.	"Symphonies of Doom" (demo version)	4:08
14.	"Dead of the Night" (demo version)	3:33

== Lyrical and musical themes ==
- The songs "Majesty" and "Run for the Night", as well as the titles of instrumentals "By the Gates of Moria" and "Gandalf's Rebirth", are based on J. R. R. Tolkien's The Lord of the Rings.
- Parts of "By the Gates of Moria" are derived from Antonín Dvořák's Symphony No. 9, "From the New World".
- "Majesty" opens with a barrel organ version of Johann Strauss II's waltz The Blue Danube.
- "Guardian of the Blind" was mostly inspired by Stephen King's It.
- "The Martyr" is about Jesus Christ's passion.
- "Battalions of Fear" refers to US president Ronald Reagan's Strategic Defense Initiative.
- "Wizard's Crown" is about Aleister Crowley. The song was originally titled "Halloween" on the Symphonies of Doom demo tape (1985) while the band was still Lucifer's Heritage. The song name was changed probably to avoid confusion with a song of the same name by fellow German power/speed metal band Helloween.
- "Brian" is about the film Monty Python's Life of Brian.

== Personnel ==
Blind Guardian

- Hansi Kürsch – vocals and bass, producer on "Gandalf's Rebirth"
- André Olbrich – lead guitar and backing vocals, producer on "Gandalf's Rebirth"
- Marcus Siepen – rhythm guitar and backing vocals
- Thomas "Thomen" Stauch – drums

Guest musicians

- Hans-Peter Frey – drums on "Gandalf's Rebirth"
- Christof Theisen – rhythm guitar on "Gandalf's Rebirth"
- Rolf Köhler, Michael Voss – backing vocals

Production

- Kalle Trapp – production, engineering, mixing
- Holger Schreiber – engineering on "Gandalf's Rebirth"
- van Waay Design – cover art

Lucifer's Heritage (tracks 10–14)

- Hansi Kürsch – vocals and bass
- André Olbrich – lead guitar
- Markus Dörk – rhythm guitar, additional vocals on "Symphonies of Doom"
- Thomas "Thomen" Stauch – drums

== Charts ==
Chart (2018)	Peak position
German Albums (Offizielle Top 100)	53
