= Border of Reality =

Studio album by Angel Dust
- Released: August 21, 1998
- Genre: Power metal, progressive metal, heavy metal, speed metal
- Length: 55:04
- Label: Century Media

Angel Dust chronology
To Dust You Will Decay (1988)	Border of Reality (1998)	Bleed (1999)

Professional ratings
Review scores
Source	Rating
AllMusic	4/5 stars
Rock Hard	8.5/10 stars

Border of Reality is the third studio album by German heavy metal band Angel Dust, released in 1998.

== Track listing ==
1. "Border of Reality" – 4:52
2. "No More Faith" – 4:12
3. "Nightmare" – 4:43
4. "Centuries" – 5:19
5. "When I Die" – 9:45
6. "Where the Wind Blows" – 7:36
7. "Spotlight Kid" (Rainbow cover) – 4:22
8. "Behind the Mirror" – 8:17
9. "Coming Home" – 5:58
10. "Easy Livin'" – 2:37 (Uriah Heep cover)

== Credits ==
- Dirk Thurisch – vocals, guitar
- Frank Banx – bass, vocals
- Steven Banx – keyboards
- Dirk Assmuth – drums
- Bernd Aufermann – guitar
