= Bleed (album) =

Studio album by Angel Dust
- Released: 12 October 1999
- Recorded: Woodhouse Studios, Hagen, Germany
- Genre: Power metal, heavy metal, progressive metal
- Length: 65:01
- Label: Century Media
- Producer: Siggi Bemm & Angel Dust

Angel Dust chronology
Border of Reality (1998)	Bleed (1999)	Enlighten the Darkness (2000)

Bleed is the fourth studio album by German power metal band Angel Dust, released on 12 October 1999.

== Reception ==
Professional ratings
Review scores
Source	Rating
AllMusic	2.5/5 stars
Chronicles of Chaos	9/10
Rock Hard	8.5/10

AllMusic's Jason Anderson referred to the album as "an interesting blend of metal subgenres that unfortunately doesn't add up to the sum of its parts." Boris Kaiser of Rock Hard assigned it a rating of 8.5, calling it an "extremely strong album" and noting stylistic similarities to Dream Theater and Savatage. DanDevil, writing for Metal.de, commented that the album "continues the path taken with" its predecessor, Border of Reality. In a 9/10 review for Chronicles of Chaos, Adrian Bromley noted "intricate guitar riffs, truly amazing melodic vocals and great atmosphere" as "the key to their success with Bleed."

== Track listing ==
Bleed track listing
No.	Title	Length
1.	"Bleed"	4:39
2.	"Black Rain"	3:47
3.	"Never"	6:02
4.	"Follow Me (Part 1)"	4:30
5.	"Follow Me (Part 2)"	6:14
6.	"Addicted to Serenity"	5:05
7.	"Surrender?"	7:06
8.	"Sanity"	6:01
9.	"Liquid Angel"	4:44
10.	"Memories" (bonus track)	4:52
11.	"Temple of the King" (bonus track)	6:32
12.	"Nightmare (Extended Version)" (bonus track)	5:11
Total length:		65:01

== Personnel ==
Credits adapted from AllMusic.

- Axel Hermann, cover art
- Bemm, producer
- Bernd Aufermann, guitar
- Dirk Assmuth, drums
- Dirk Thurisch, vocals
- Frank Banx, bass
- Matthias Klinkmann, engineer
- Ritchie Blackmore, composer
- Ronnie James Dio, composer
- Siggi, producer
- Steven Banx, design, keyboards, layout design
