= The Landing (album) =

Studio album by Iron Savior
- Released: 18 November 2011
- Recorded: June – September 2011 at Powerhouse Studio, Hamburg, Germany
- Genre: Power metal, heavy metal
- Length: 49:24
- Label: AFM
- Producer: Piet Sielck

Iron Savior chronology
Megatropolis (2007)	The Landing (2011)	Rise of the Hero (2014)

Professional ratings
Review scores
Source	Rating
Metal Temple	8/10 stars
Metal Crypt	4.5/5 stars

The Landing is the seventh full-length album by the German power metal band Iron Savior, released on 18 November 2011. It was recorded, mixed and mastered at Powerhouse Studio in Hamburg from June - September 2011 with the drums being recorded at Rekorder Studio in August 2011. It is the first album to feature returning bassist Jan-Sören Eckert since the 2002 album Condition Red.

== Track listing ==
All music is composed by Piet Sielck

No.	Title	Length
1.	"Descending"	1:04
2.	"The Savior"	4:47
3.	"Starlight"	4:51
4.	"March of Doom"	4:42
5.	"Heavy Metal Never Dies"	4:14
6.	"Moment in Time"	5:07
7.	"Hall of the Heroes"	5:38
8.	"R.U. Ready"	4:48
9.	"Faster Than All"	5:03
10.	"Before the Pain"	4:34
11.	"No Guts No Glory"	4:28

Limited Edition bonus tracks
No.	Title	Length
1.	"Coming Home" (Re-recorded 2011)	5:04
2.	"Atlantis Falling" (Re-recorded 2011)	4:35

Japanese bonus tracks
No.	Title	Length
1.	"Coming Home" (Re-recorded 2011)	5:04
2.	"Atlantis Falling" (Re-recorded 2011)	4:35
3.	"Underneath the Radar" (Underworld cover)	4:32

== Interview ==
In an interview given by Sarkophag Rocks, Piet Sielck was asked why it took so long to release a follow-up to the previous album Megatropolis:

"One reason is my former band, SAVAGE CIRCUS, which demanded a lot of my time. Once again, I had to write all of the songs and the whole production basically on my own, which was a very hard job. The second reason is the downfall of my former record label, Dockyard. After rather bad mismanagement, the company went bankrupt in 2009. Being left alone by my former partners, I faced this hell and cleaned up the mess they've left behind for almost two years. I lost a lot of money and for a certain time also my belief in music. Finally I was able to sell the remains and pay off most of the debts. Anyhow, in late 2010, I finally saw some light at the end of the tunnel and my passion for music returned. So I started writing 'The Landing'."

== Personnel ==
- Piet Sielck – Lead Vocals, Guitar
- Joachim Küstner – guitar, Backing Vocals
- Jan S. Eckert – Bass, Backing Vocals
- Thomas Nack – Drums and Miscellaneous Percussion
