= Condition Red (Iron Savior album) =

Studio album by Iron Savior
- Released: 3 June 2002
- Recorded: October 2001 – January 2002 at Powerhouse Studio, Hamburg, Germany
- Genre: Power metal, heavy metal
- Length: 66:37
- Label: Noise / Sanctuary
- Producer: Piet Sielck, Iron Savior

Iron Savior chronology
Dark Assault (2001)	Condition Red (2002)	Battering Ram (2004)

Singles from Condition Red
- 1. "Titans of Our Time" Released: 2002

Professional ratings
Review scores
Source	Rating
Allmusic	3/5 stars
Metal.de	7/10

Condition Red is the fourth studio album by the German power metal band Iron Savior. It continues the science fiction story that the band introduced on their debut album Iron Savior and continued on Unification, the Interlude EP, and Dark Assault. It is the last album to feature keyboardist Andreas Kück and bassist Jan-Sören Eckert (who would later return in 2011 on The Landing).

== Track listing ==
All tracks are written by Piet Sielck, except where noted.

No.	Title	Length
1.	"Titans of Our Time"	3:54
2.	"Protector"	4:36
3.	"Ironbound"	5:22
4.	"Condition Red"	4:57
5.	"Warrior"	4:48
6.	"Mindfeeder"	4:45
7.	"Walls of Fire"	4:21
8.	"Tales of the Bold"	5:31
9.	"No Heroes" (music by Joachim Küstner, lyrics by Sielck)	4:15
10.	"Paradise"	5:48
11.	"Thunderbird"	7:23

Limited Edition bonus tracks
No.	Title	Writer(s)	Length
1.	"I Will Be There"		5:50
2.	"Crazy" (Seal cover)	Seal, Guy Sigsworth	5:08

Japanese edition bonus track
No.	Title	Writer(s)	Length
14.	"Living After Midnight" (Judas Priest cover)	Glenn Tipton, Rob Halford, K.K. Downing	3:19

== Personnel ==
Iron Savior

- Piet Sielck – lead vocals, guitar, backing vocals
- Joachim "Piesel" Küstner – guitar, backing vocals
- Andreas Kück – keyboards, backing vocals
- Jan-Sören Eckert – bass, backing vocals
- Thomas Nack – drums and percussion

Additional musicians

- Rolf Köhler – backing vocals

Production

- Piet Sielck – producer, engineer, mixing, mastering, cover artwork concept, booklet concept
- Iron Savior – additional production
- Marisa Jacobi – graphic design
- Jo Kirchherr – photography

== Additional information ==
- Drums and percussion recorded at Hammer Musik Studio, Hamburg in October 2001.
