= Enlighten the Darkness =

Studio album by Angel Dust
- Released: 18 July 2000
- Studio: Woodhouse Studios, Hagen, Germany
- Genre: Thrash metal, power metal, heavy metal, progressive metal
- Length: 52:52
- Label: Century Media

Angel Dust chronology
Bleed (1999)	Enlighten the Darkness (2000)	Of Human Bondage (2002)

Professional ratings
Review scores
Source	Rating
AllMusic	4/5 stars

Enlighten the Darkness is the fifth studio album by German heavy metal band Angel Dust, released in 2000.

== Track listing ==
1. "Let Me Live" – 5:53
2. "The One You Are" – 5:29
3. "Enjoy!" – 5:52
4. "Fly Away" – 6:47
5. "Come Into Resistance" – 5:24
6. "Beneath the Silence" – 3:05
7. "Still I'm Bleeding" – 4:18
8. "I Need You" – 5:21
9. "First in Line" – 1:15
10. "Cross of Hatred" – 4:59
11. "Oceans of Tomorrow" – 4:17

== Credits ==
- Dirk Thurisch – vocals
- Bernd Aufermann – guitar
- Frank Banx – bass
- Steven Banx – keyboards
- Dirk Assmuth – drums
