= Dreamland Manor =

Studio album by Savage Circus
- Released: August 29, 2005 (Germany); September 29, 2005 (Japan); March 21, 2006 (USA)
- Recorded: Powerhouse Studio, Germany
- Genre: Power metal
- Length: 57:19
- Label: Dockyard 1, Century Media
- Producer: Piet Sielck

Savage Circus chronology
Dreamland Manor (2005)	Live in Atlanta (2007)

Professional ratings
Review scores
Source	Rating
AllMusic	3/5 stars
Metal Underground	4/5 stars
Sea of Tranquility	4.5/5 stars
Sputnikmusic	3.5/5 stars

Dreamland Manor is the debut album of German power metal band Savage Circus. The album sounds similar to older classic Blind Guardian.

== Writing ==
The band wrote most of the album together. Three songs, however, were written solely by Thomen for the next Blind Guardian album: "Evil Eyes", "It – The Gathering", and the ballad "Beyond Reality". Thomen comments:

Three songs I wrote for Blind Guardian. And when I noticed, when they were done, that the songs were very similar to old Blind Guardian stuff, more back-to-the-roots, I noticed that it would be big problem to present these songs to my ex-band members, because, OK, then I was still in the band, but I knew when I would play the songs to them they would say: "Hey, this is something we already did ten years ago."

== Track listing ==
All music written by: Savage Circus
All lyrics by: Jens Carlsson and Piet Sielck

No.	Title	Length
1.	"Evil Eyes"	6:58
2.	"Between the Devil and the Seas"	5:25
3.	"Waltz of the Demon"	6:56
4.	"Tomorrowland"	6:27
5.	"It - The Gathering"	6:15
6.	"Beyond Reality"	5:23
7.	"When Hell Awakes"	7:34
8.	"Ghost Story"	7:05
9.	"Born Again by the Night"	5:16
Total length:		57:19

Japanese bonus track
No.	Title	Length
10.	"Ça plane pour moi" (Plastic Bertrand cover)	3:04

== Trivia ==
- The Japanese bonus track "Ça plane pour moi" is sung in French, however Jens does not speak the language. Emil knows some French, and he wrote down the lyrics at home in Umeå and told Jens how to pronounce it.

== Credits ==
- Jens Carlsson – lead vocals
- Emil Norberg – guitar
- Piet Sielck – guitar, bass, and backing vocals
- Thomas Stauch – drums

Guest musicians

- Rolf Köhler – backing vocals
