= A Night at the Opera (Blind Guardian album) =

- Cover art by Paul R. Gregory

Studio album by Blind Guardian
- Released: 25 March 2002
- Recorded: January–December 2001 at Twilight Hall Studios, Grefrath and Hammer Music Studios, Hamburg, Germany
- Genres: Power metal; progressive metal; symphonic metal
- Length: 67:01
- Label: Virgin/Century Media
- Producer: Charlie Bauerfeind

Blind Guardian chronology
Nightfall in Middle-Earth (1998)	A Night at the Opera (2002)	A Twist in the Myth (2006)

Singles from A Night at the Opera
- 1. "And Then There Was Silence" Released: 12 November 2001

Professional ratings
Review scores
Source	Rating
AllMusic	2.5/5 stars
Exclaim!	favorable
Rock Hard	9/10

A Night at the Opera is the seventh studio album by the German power metal band Blind Guardian, released in 2002. It is named after the 1975 Queen album of the same name, which is itself named after the Marx brothers film of the same name.

This album continues a stylistic change from power metal into a more progressive sound, with multiple overlaid vocals, choirs, orchestral keys and guitar leads and less emphasis on powerful guitar riffs and heavy rhythms. As a result, drummer Thomen Stauch would leave the group, citing dissatisfaction with the direction the group was going in.

== Album content ==
There are six different studio versions and two official live versions of "Harvest of Sorrow" – two in English, two in Spanish ("Mies Del Dolor", "La Cosecha Del Dolor"), one in Italian ("Frutto Del Buio"), and one in French ("Moisson de Peine").

The song "Battlefield" is featured as the music in the heavy metal edition of the Adult Swim game Robot Unicorn Attack.

== Lyrical references ==
The album features the concepts and themes familiar to Blind Guardian fans, such as historical battles and religious references.

- "Precious Jerusalem" is based on the final days of Jesus of Nazareth and his temptation in the desert.
- "Battlefield" is based on Song of Hildebrandt, an old German tale of a father and son who find themselves in a duel to the death.
- "Under the Ice" has connections to the Iliad, focuses on Cassandra and what happened to her after the Trojan War, particularly from The Oresteia.
- "Sadly Sings Destiny" is based on the religious aspect of the Messiah in the Old Testament, and tells of the crucifixion of Jesus from the point of view of a character who reluctantly helps fulfil the prophecy, by doing such things as building the True Cross and weaving the Crown of Thorns.
- "The Maiden and the Minstrel Knight" is based on an episode from the story of Tristan und Isolde.
- "Wait for an Answer" allegorically concerns the Nazi propaganda machine.
- "The Soulforged" is based on the Dragonlance saga's tales of the mage Raistlin Majere.
- "Age of False Innocence" is about Galileo Galilei.
- "Punishment Divine" is about Friedrich Nietzsche's decline into insanity where he imagines himself being judged by a court of saints.
- "And Then There Was Silence" is about Cassandra's visions of the coming Trojan War. It was inspired by Homer's Iliad and Odyssey and Virgil's Aeneid.

== Track listing ==
All lyrics are written by Hansi Kürsch; all music is composed by André Olbrich and Kürsch, except where noted.

No.	Title	Music	Length
1.	"Precious Jerusalem"		6:22
2.	"Battlefield"	Olbrich • Kürsch • Thomen Stauch	5:37
3.	"Under the Ice"		5:44
4.	"Sadly Sings Destiny"		6:04
5.	"The Maiden and the Minstrel Knight"		5:30
6.	"Wait for an Answer"		6:30
7.	"The Soulforged"	Olbrich • Kürsch • Stauch	5:18
8.	"Age of False Innocence"		6:05
9.	"Punishment Divine"		5:45
10.	"And Then There Was Silence"		14:06

2018 re-release bonus tracks
No.	Title	Length
11.	"Age of False Innocence (Preproduction Mix 2018)"	5:42
12.	"Under the Ice (Preproduction Mix 2018)"	5:40

Bonus tracks from Harvest of Sorrow EP
No.	Title	Music	Length
11.	"Harvest of Sorrow (Acoustic Version)" (Japanese bonus)	Marcus Siepen • Kürsch • Stauch	3:39
12.	"Mies del dolor" (Spain/North American bonus)	Siepen • Kürsch • Stauch	3:39
13.	"La cosecha del dolor" (Argentine bonus)	Siepen • Kürsch • Stauch	3:39
14.	"Frutto del buio" (Italian bonus)	Siepen • Kürsch • Stauch	3:39
15.	"Moisson de peine" (French bonus)	Siepen • Kürsch • Stauch	3:39

== Personnel ==
Blind Guardian

- Hansi Kürsch – lead and backing vocals
- André Olbrich – lead, rhythm and acoustic guitars
- Marcus Siepen – rhythm guitar
- Thomen Stauch – drums & percussion

Guest musicians

- Oliver Holzwarth – bass guitar
- Mathias Wiesner – keyboards & orchestral arrangements
- Michael Schüren – piano on "Age of False Innocence"
- Pad Bender, Boris Schmidt & Sascha Pierro – keyboards and sound effects
- Rolf Köhler, Thomas Hackmann, Olaf Senkbeil & Billy King – The Choir Company

Production

- Charlie Bauerfeind – production, mixing, recording
- Nordin Hammadi Amrani – assistant engineer, additional recordings
- Clemens von Witte – recordings (backing vocals)
- Detlef – recordings (backing vocals)
- Paul Raymond Gregory – cover painting
- André Olbrich – front cover concept
- Dennis "Sir" Kostroman – booklet design
- Axel Jusseit – photos

== Charts ==
Chart (2002)	Peak position
Austrian Albums (Ö3 Austria)	17
French Albums (SNEP)	67
German Albums (Offizielle Top 100)	5
Italian Albums (FIMI)	11
Japanese Albums (Oricon)	29
Swedish Albums (Sverigetopplistan)	10
Swiss Albums (Schweizer Hitparade)	44
US Independent Albums (Billboard)	37
