= Fly (Blind Guardian song) =

2006 single by Blind Guardian

Single by Blind Guardian

from the album A Twist in the Myth
- Released: 24 February 2006
- Genre: Power metal; progressive metal
- Length: 5:46
- Label: Nuclear Blast
- Songwriters: Hansi Kürsch, André Olbrich
- Producer: Charlie Bauerfeind

Blind Guardian singles chronology
"The Bard's Song (In the Forest)" (2003)	"Fly" (2006)	"Another Stranger Me" (2007)

"Fly" is a song by German power metal band Blind Guardian and the second single from their 2006 album A Twist in the Myth. Two of the songs are from the album ("Fly" and "Skalds and Shadows"), with the latter being an acoustic version only available on the single. The single also includes a cover of Iron Butterfly's "In-A-Gadda-Da-Vida", also available only on the single.

Vocalist Hansi Kürsch has said that while "Fly" is a surprising title for a Blind Guardian song, it fits very well with the lyrics. He added, "This song is about inspirations and how they can influence your art, your life and other people's lives. I, myself, was inspired by the movie Finding Neverland when doing the lyrics."

== Track listing ==
1. "Fly" – 5:46
2. "Skalds and Shadows" (Acoustic Version) – 3:15
3. "In-A-Gadda-Da-Vida" (Iron Butterfly cover) – 3:37

== Personnel ==
- Hansi Kürsch - vocals
- André Olbrich - guitar
- Marcus Siepen - guitar
- Frederik Ehmke - drums

== Charts ==
Chart (2006)	Peak position
Japan	178
Hungary	4
Austria (Ö3 Austria Top 40)	52
Germany (GfK)	32
Italy (FIMI)	34
Spain (PROMUSICAE)	4
Sweden (Sverigetopplistan)	29
Switzerland (Schweizer Hitparade)	94
UK Rock & Metal (OCC)	37
