= Dark Empire (band) =

American power metal band

- Origin: Verona, New Jersey, U.S.
- Genres: Power metal, thrash metal, progressive metal, melodic death metal
- Years active: 2004–2013
- Members: Matt Moliti; Randy Knecht; Matt Graff; Derrick Schneider; Christian Colabelli; Harris Bergsohn

Dark Empire was an American heavy metal band from New Jersey. The band played a mix of power metal, thrash metal, progressive metal, and melodic death metal.

== History ==
Dark Empire was created in the winter of early 2004 by Verona, New Jersey-based guitarist Matt Moliti.

In early 2005, the recording of their debut album, Distant Tides, commenced. Distant Tides was released on April 25, 2006, and received rave reviews from specialized publications. The album was picked up for its first official label release by Rock Machine Records in Brazil, and was remastered by renowned Finnish engineer Mikka Jussila (Children of Bodom, Stratovarius, Nightwish, etc.). Their second album, Humanity Dethroned, commenced recording in early 2008 and was released on May 5 of that year.

Dark Empire disbanded in July 2013.

== Band members ==
Final members

- Derrick Schneider – lead vocals (2013)
- Matt Moliti – guitars, growls (2004–2013)
- Randy Knecht – bass guitar (2008–2013)
- Matt Graff – drums (2010–2013)
- Christian Colabelli – guitar (2012–2013)
- Harris Bergsohn – keyboards, acoustic guitar (2012–2013)

Session musicians

- Marc Ferreira – bass guitar, backing vocals (live) (2007)
- Omar Davila – drums (live) (2008)
- Brian Larkin – vocals (live) (2008)

Former members

- Brian Larkin – lead vocals (2011–2013)
- Urban Breed – vocals (a few months in 2010)
- Andrew Atwood – guitar (2007–2010)
- Jens Carlsson – vocals (2004–2009)
- Samus – drums (2006–2008)
- Teemu Tahkanen – drums (2004–2006)
- Noah Martin – bass guitar (2004–2006)

== Discography ==
Studio albums

- Distant Tides (2006)
- Humanity Dethroned (2008)
- From Refuge to Ruin (2012)

Singles

- "Northern Sky" (2006)
