= Dark Assault =

Studio album by Iron Savior
- Released: 6 March 2001
- Recorded: July – October 2000 at Powerhouse Studio and Hansen Studio, Hamburg, Germany
- Genre: Power metal, heavy metal
- Length: 61:20
- Label: Noise
- Producer: Piet Sielck, Kai Hansen, Iron Savior

Iron Savior chronology
Interlude (1999)	Dark Assault (2001)	Condition Red (2002)

Dark Assault is the third studio album by the German power metal band Iron Savior. It continues the science fiction story that the band introduced on their debut album Iron Savior and continued on Unification and the Interlude EP. It is the first album to feature guitarist Joachim Küstner and the last to feature Kai Hansen before committing himself back to his band Gamma Ray.

== Story ==
From the CD booklet:

Over 30 years have passed by since the IRON SAVIOR had been defeated and Terranians and Calderans finally unified. Both worlds, Earth and Calderan, have been living in brothership ever since. Within the "Federation of Atlantis" Terranians and Calderans have grown together more and more. But these golden decades ended abruptly when space and time were ripped apart and a gateway opened its mouth between the dimensions like the Jaws in Hell. This was the day when the SHADOW came. A violent and highly aggressive species emerged from the gate. The SHADOW came from another dimension, a different universe where after millions of years no other species existed any more. Since ancient times they have moved from one world to another draining all resources and energy and leaving behind cold and lifeless matter, wasteland and exploited planets. And so the universe of the SHADOW has become a universe of everlasting darkness where night has fallen for eternity. The SHADOW would be doomed to die, but they developed a technology to travel into different dimensions and realities in order to search new hunting grounds. Thus they are expanding their Empire of Darkness more and more as they have already done for millions of years. This gateway brought the SHADOW into the hemisphere of man, into a virgin and unspoilt universe with all its resources to exploit. And so the black army of the SHADOW intruded our world, merciless and cruel like deadly predators on the hunt for prey. Desperately man tries to fight back and stop the SHADOW, but it seems to be impossible...

Far away from all this the IRON SAVIOR is drifting alone in deep space. Since the SAVIOR has been defeated by man, the bio-unit desperately tried to regain the control over the machine. But the artificial intelligence of the computer was still deranged and confused. The computer had gained a consciousness during the millenniums but somehow it was still tied to its basic programming from ancient Atlantis. Due to the non-existence of the Atlantian continent it always came to the fatal conclusion that Atlantis had been destroyed by the Alliance, the forfathers [sic] of man. But finally the bio-Unit is able to convince the machine that after 350,000 years the basic programming is not relevant any more and that man actually consists of the sons and daughters of the ancient creators. And that bio-Unit and machine would have to protect and serve Atlantis. And so the IRON SAVIOR is on its way to return to EARTH...

Meanwhile a devastating battle between man and SHADOW is raging. Even though man fights in defiance of death, the SHADOW is thrusting forward more and more. Through the gat the invasion troops get a neverending backup - for every destroyed SHADOW vessel ten new ones seem emerge from the gate. If the gate was inoperative, the SHADOW would be cut off from this backup... So a brave command dares to pass through the gate in order to destroy it from the beyond. The men do not know what awaits them, but it is very unlikely that they will ever see Earth again. How can they return when the gate is destroyed? And the suicide mission begins...

The IRON SAVIOR opens fire to the SHADOW vessels. Grimly and relentlessly he carries out his orders and the table seems to turn. The forces of the ancient machine drive the SHADOW back to the gate. Now the gate command must be successful in order to defeat and banish this dreadful and mortal danger to man and the entire universe.....

== Track listing ==
No.	Title	Lyrics	Music	Length
1.	"Never Say Die"	Piet Sielck	Sielck	5:32
2.	"Seek and Destroy"	Sielck	Sielck	3:45
3.	"Solar Wings"	Sielck, Kai Hansen	Sielck, Hansen	4:33
4.	"I've Been to Hell"	Sielck	Sielck, Jan-Sören Eckert	4:04
5.	"Dragons Rising"	Sielck	Sielck	6:24
6.	"Predators"	Sielck	Sielck	3:54
7.	"Made of Metal"	Sielck	Sielck	6:57
8.	"Firing the Guns"	Sielck	Sielck, Eckert	4:42
9.	"Eye of the World"	Sielck	Sielck	5:18
10.	"Back into the Light"	Sielck	Sielck	5:51
11.	"After the War"	Sielck, Eckert	Sielck, Eckert	6:18
12.	"Delivering the Goods" (Judas Priest cover)	Glenn Tipton, Rob Halford, K.K. Downing	Tipton, Halford, Downing	3:59

Japanese edition bonus tracks
No.	Title	Lyrics	Music	Length
13.	"Headhunter" (Krokus cover)	Butch Stone, Chris von Rohr, Fernando von Arb, Marc Storace	Stone, von Rohr, von Arb, Storace	4:18
14.	"The Hellion / Electric Eye" (Judas Priest cover)	Tipton, Halford, Downing	Tipton, Halford, Downing	4:18

== Personnel ==
Iron Savior

- Piet Sielck – lead vocals, guitar
- Kai Hansen – guitar, backing vocals, lead vocals on "Solar Wings"
- Joachim "Piesel" Küstner – guitar, backing vocals
- Andreas Kück – keyboards, backing vocals
- Jan-Sören Eckert – bass, backing vocals, additional lead vocals on "After the War"
- Thomas Nack – drums and percussion

Production

- Piet Sielck – producer, engineer, mixing
- Kai Hansen – additional production on "Solar Wings", vocal production on "Made of Metal" and "Back into the Light"
- Iron Savior – additional production
- Holger Drees – artwork
- Maren Kumpe – booklet design
- Jo Kirchherr – photography
