= A Twist in the Myth =

Studio album by Blind Guardian
- Released: 1 September 2006
- Recorded: September 2005 – April 2006, Twilight Hall Studios
- Genre: Power metal; progressive metal; symphonic metal
- Length: 51:49
- Label: Nuclear Blast
- Producer: Charlie Bauerfeind

Blind Guardian chronology
A Night at the Opera (2002)	A Twist in the Myth (2006)	At the Edge of Time (2010)

Singles from A Twist in the Myth
- 1. "Fly" Released: 24 February 2006; 2. "Another Stranger Me" Released: 4 May 2007

Professional ratings
Review scores
Source	Rating
AllMusic	3.5/5 stars
Rock Hard	8.5/10
Sea of Tranquility	4.5/5 stars
Lords of Metal	89/100

A Twist in the Myth is the eighth studio album by the German power metal band Blind Guardian. It was originally set to be released on 5 September 2006 in Europe (which became the North American release date), but Nuclear Blast changed the release date to 1 September 2006.

The album was released in several different formats: a normal version, a digipak version with a bonus track and bonus CD, and a limited edition book-version. The book contains the digipak, along with a guitar pick, booklet and certificate of authenticity and autographs, as well as a dragon-shaped seal and a bar of red sealing wax.

== Track listing ==
All music written by André Olbrich and Hansi Kürsch. All lyrics written by Kürsch.

No.	Title	Length
1.	"This Will Never End"	5:07
2.	"Otherland"	5:15
3.	"Turn the Page"	4:18
4.	"Fly"	5:45
5.	"Carry the Blessed Home"	4:04
6.	"Another Stranger Me"	4:37
7.	"Straight Through the Mirror"	5:50
8.	"Lionheart"	4:17
9.	"Skalds and Shadows"	3:13
10.	"The Edge"	4:29
11.	"The New Order"	4:54
Total length:		51:49

Japanese edition bonus track
No.	Title	Writer(s)	Length
12.	"All the King's Horses"	Marcus Siepen, Kürsch	4:12
Total length:			56:01

Digipack bonus track (includes Japanese edition bonus track)
No.	Title	Length
13.	"Dead Sound of Misery"	5:18
Total length:		61:19

Digipack bonus CD
No.	Title	Length
1.	"Interview"	12:21
Total length:		12:21

Double LP bonus tracks
No.	Title	Length
1.	"Market Square" (Demo version)	5:51
2.	"Interview" (English)	12:21
Total length:		18:12

- "All the King's Horses" is also available on the single "Another Stranger Me".
- "Market Square" is the demo version of "Straight Through the Mirror" and is only available on the Double LP and Limited Book versions of the album.

== Lyrical references ==
- "This Will Never End" is inspired by Walter Moers' A Wild Ride Through the Night and tells of a meeting between the young illustrator Gustave Doré and the Grim Reaper who begins to doubt the existence of a divine masterplan and thus his own purpose.
- "Otherland" is based on Tad Williams' Otherland series of novels.
- "Turn the Page" is about the Wiccan ritual of renewal and change of seasons, dealing with the Horned God and also contains references to the historical shift from Paganism to Christianity.
- "Fly" contains references to Peter Pan and was inspired by the film Finding Neverland.
- "Carry the Blessed Home" is about Roland the Gunslinger and Jake Chambers at the end of Stephen King's Dark Tower series.
- "Another Stranger Me" is about a person with dissociative identity disorder who discovers his multiple personalities and tries to find a way out of his situation.
- "Straight through the Mirror" tells how dreams can change very quickly – it's about the importance of dreams in general too. Some claim it's about a person describing the experience and process of dying while in reality this person is just dreaming it all.
- "Lionheart" is about Ulysses and how he travels through Hades, but in this song he doesn't find the way out. Hansi took inspiration from French artist Gustave Dore and his illustrations of Dante's Inferno, whose main character, Dante the Pilgrim, meets Ulysses during his tour of Hell.
- "Skalds and Shadows" is sung from the point of view of an Old Norse Skald with an allusion towards the Saga of the Volsungs (specifically the story of Sigurd and Brunhilde) at the end.
- "The Edge" is about St. Paul and his faith in Jesus Christ as the incarnation of God and his belief in the imminent ending of the world ("This is the Edge now/It's all we're living for...")
- "The New Order" deals with the necessity of changes.
- "All the King's Horses" is based on Welsh folklore and the Arthurian cycle and features references to Taliesin and the Holy Grail.
- "Dead Sound of Misery" is a darker version of "Fly" in a different key with alternate lyrics and vocal melodies portraying a mythological vision of the Apocalypse.

== Personnel ==
Band members

- Hansi Kürsch – vocals
- André Olbrich – lead guitar
- Marcus Siepen – rhythm guitar
- Frederik Ehmke – drums, percussion, flute and bagpipes

Guest Musicians

- Oliver Holzwarth – bass guitar
- The Choir Company – Olaf Senkbeil, Rolf Köhler, Thomas Hackmann
- Martin G. Meyer and Pat Benzner – keyboards

Production

- Charlie Bauerfeind – producing, mastering, mixing and engineering
- Blind Guardian – producing
- Jan Rubach – engineering
- Marc Schettler – assistant engineering
- Anthony Clarkson – artwork
- Axel Jusseit – photos
- Nikolay S. Simkin – booklet design

== Charts ==
Chart (2006)	Peak position
Austrian Albums (Ö3 Austria)	19
Finnish Albums (Suomen virallinen lista)	30
French Albums (SNEP)	87
German Albums (Offizielle Top 100)	4
Hungarian Albums (MAHASZ)	35
Italian Albums (FIMI)	24
Japanese Albums (Oricon)	21
Norwegian Albums (VG-lista)	39
Spanish Albums (PROMUSICAE)	15
Swedish Albums (Sverigetopplistan)	10
Swiss Albums (Schweizer Hitparade)	27
UK Independent Albums (OCC)	33
US Heatseekers Albums (Billboard)	13
US Independent Albums (Billboard)	21
