= Angel Dust (German band) =

German power metal band

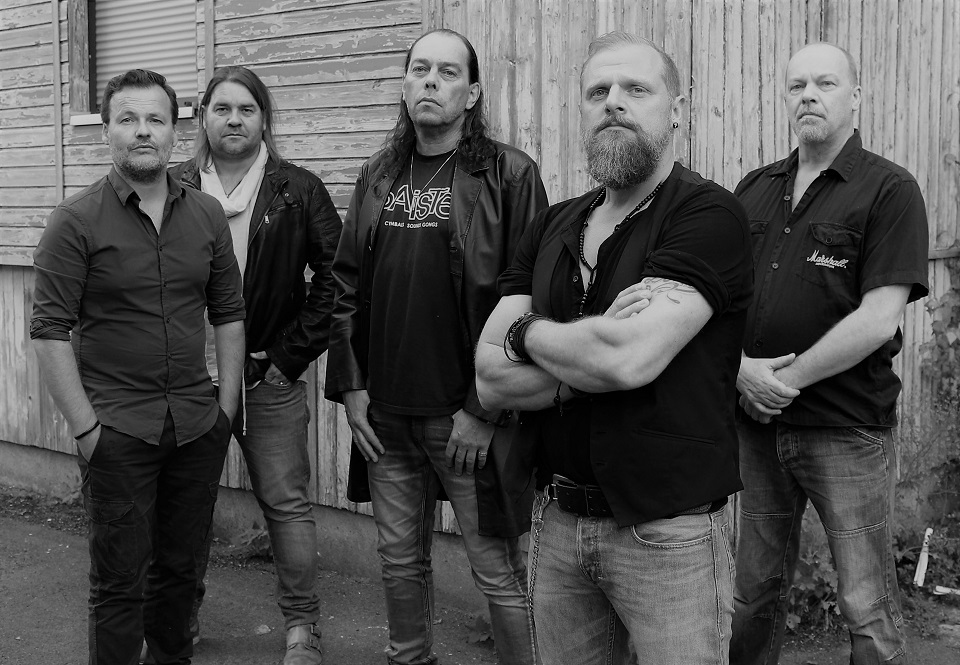
- Angel Dust in 2018

Background information
- Origin: Dortmund, Germany
- Genres: Power metal; heavy metal; speed metal; thrash metal; progressive metal
- Years active: 1984–1990; 1997–2011; 2016–present
- Labels: Disaster; Century Media
- Members: Dirk Assmuth; Bernd Aufermann; Dirk Thurisch; Boris Odenkirchen; Marc Herrmann
- Past members: S.L. Coe; Frank Banx; Carsten Kaiser; Romme Keymer; Andreas Lohrum; Vinny Lynn; Stefan K. Nauer; Ritchie Wilkison; Christian Polhmann; Steven Banx
- Website: angel-dust.de

Angel Dust (originally Angeldust) is a German heavy metal band from Dortmund. Initially active from 1984 to 1990 as a speed and thrash metal band, they moved towards a power/progressive metal sound upon reforming in 1998.

== History ==
=== Initial career (1984–1990) ===
Angel Dust formed in Dortmund in 1984 as a typical garage band. They took their name from a song title off English black metal band Venom's debut album Welcome to Hell. The band's musical style was initially heavily influenced by the new wave of British heavy metal and Bay Area thrash metal scenes. They soon found their niche in the speed and thrash metal styles, which were widely popular at the time. The band released their debut studio album, Into the Dark Past, in 1986, and followed it up with To Dust You Will Decay, released in 1988. The band broke up in 1990 due to internal conflicts.

=== Reunion (1998–2011) ===
In 1998, bassist Frank Banx and original drummer Dirk Assmuth gathered a completely new lineup (including Banx' younger brother Steven Banx on keyboards) to start from scratch. This reincarnation would handle music differently, shifting towards progressive metal, and would consequently gain a solid reputation in Europe.

After releasing a few successful albums in the late 1990s and early 2000s, a series of lineup changes significantly reduced the band's activities. However, Angel Dust are still active, and have "enter[ed] the studio [in March 2006] to record the long awaited successor from Of Human Bondage."

The band's first two albums are now rare metal collectibles. They were reissued unofficially in very limited quantities in late 2002–2003, with no label or copyright info and with two bonus tracks each.

=== Second reunion (2016–present) ===
A second reunion was announced in September 2016. Pictures were posted to the band's Facebook page on 9 October 2017 announcing the recording of a new album. On 17 December 2018, the band announced via Facebook that the new album would be titled Ghosts, but they had not decided on a release date yet.

On 21 October 2020, an announcement was made by the band via Facebook they had begun recording the new album the day before. Work on the album seems to be very slow, though, as on 25 December 2024, the band announced that unfortunately the production of “Ghosts” is still not fully finished, but that more news on the subject would follow in January. However, Angel Dust had not released any further updates on “Ghosts” since then.

== Members ==
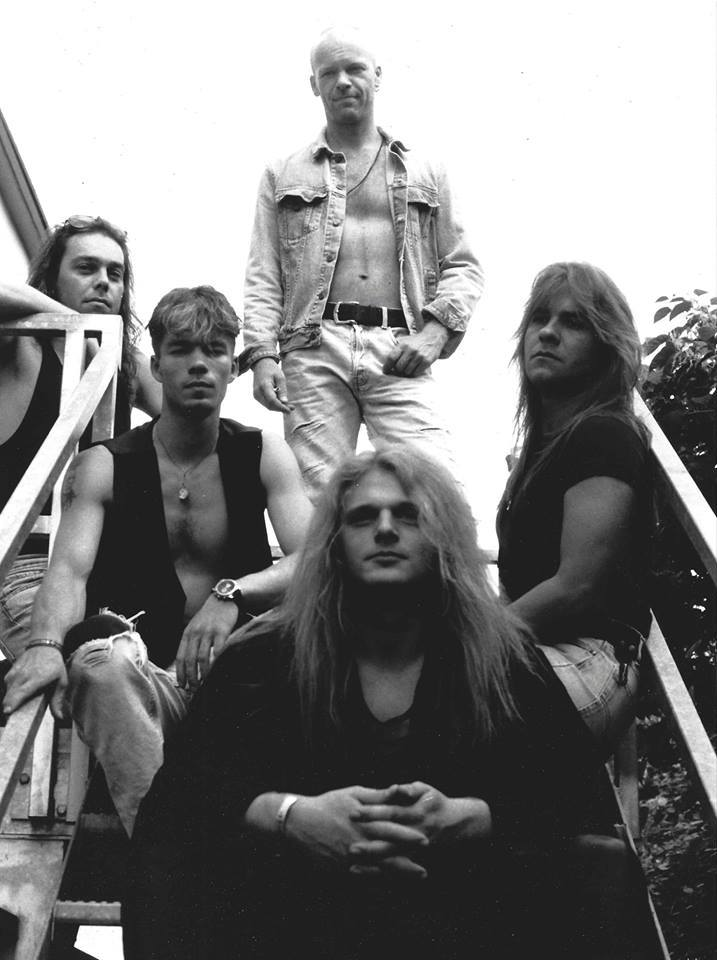
Angel Dust in 1998

=== Current lineup ===
- Dirk Assmuth – drums (1984–1990, 1997–2011, 2016–present)
- Bernd Aufermann – guitars (1997–2001, 2004–2011, 2016–present)
- Dirk Thurisch – vocals (1997–2005, 2010–2011, 2016–present)
- Boris Odenkirchen – keyboards (2016–present)
- Marc Herrmann – bass (2020–present)

=== Former members ===
- Frank Banx – bass (1984–1990, 1997–2003, 2016–2020; died 2022)
- S.L. Coe – vocals (1988–1990)
- Romme Keymer – guitars, vocals (1984–1987)
- Andreas Lohrum – guitars (1984–1987)
- Vinny Lynn – guitars (1988–1990)
- Stefan K. Nauer – guitars (1988–1990)
- Steven Banx – keyboards (1997–2011)
- Ritchie Wilkison – guitars (2001–2003)
- Carsten Kaiser – vocals (2005–2010)
- Christian Pohlmann – bass (2004–2011)

== Discography ==
- Into the Dark Past (1986, Disaster)
- To Dust You Will Decay (1988, Disaster)
- Border of Reality (1998, Century Media)
- Bleed (1999, Century Media)
- Enlighten the Darkness (2000, Century Media)
- Of Human Bondage (2001, Century Media)
