= Rise of the Hero =

Studio album by Iron Savior
- Released: 19 February 2014 (JP) (Avalon Online); 28 February 2014 (EU); 18 March 2014 (US)
- Recorded: June–December 2013 at Powerhouse Studio, Hamburg, Germany
- Genre: Power metal, heavy metal
- Length: 55:06
- Label: AFM
- Producer: Piet Sielck

Iron Savior chronology
The Landing (2011)	Rise of the Hero (2014)	Titancraft (2016)

Professional ratings
Review scores
Source	Rating
Metal Traveller	4.5/5 stars
Ultimate Guitar	7.3/10 stars

Rise of the Hero is the eighth studio album by German heavy metal band Iron Savior which was released on 28 February 2014 via AFM Records. It was recorded, mixed and mastered at Powerhouse Studio in Hamburg from June - December 2013 with the drums being recorded at Rekorder Studio in November 2013.

A music video was made for "Burning Heart".

== Track listing ==
All music is composed by Iron Savior except where noted.

No.	Title	Writer(s)	Length
1.	"Ascendence" (Intro)		1:28
2.	"Last Hero"		5:00
3.	"Revenge of the Bride"		4:35
4.	"From Far Beyond Time"		5:17
5.	"Burning Heart"		4:39
6.	"Thunder from the Mountains"		5:08
7.	"Iron Warrior"		4:41
8.	"Dragon King"		5:43
9.	"Dance with Somebody" (Mando Diao cover)	Björn Dixgård, Gustaf Norén	3:55
10.	"Firestorm"		4:58
11.	"The Demon"		5:02
12.	"Fistraiser"		4:40

Limited Edition bonus track
No.	Title	Length
1.	"I've Been to Hell" (Re-recorded 2014)	4:05

Japanese bonus tracks
No.	Title	Length
1.	"I've Been to Hell" (Re-recorded 2014)	4:05
2.	"Mind Over Matter" (Re-recorded 2014)	5:36

== Album information ==
When giving all the insight on the album, Piet Sielck gave a brief explanation as needed:

"As usual, the new album was recorded and produced in my own Powerhouse Studio. So, what can be expected? A full dose of first-class, heavy music; power metal to the max! We’ve got one really big surprise for you all though, and so far, it’s just been known as 'The Surprise Track'….. We recently did a cover version of Mando Diao’s “Dance With Somebody” and, whatever works is allowed, right? Originally it was recorded only as a bonus track for the limited edition, but we simply liked it so much that we finally decided to make it a regular album track….."

== Credits ==
- Piet Sielck – vocals, guitars
- Joachim "Piesel" Küstner – guitars, backing vocals, additional lead vocals on "I've Been to Hell 2014" and "Mind Over Matter 2014"
- Jan-Sören Eckert – bass, backing vocals
- Thomas Nack – drums, backing vocals

=== Production ===
- Felipe Machado Franco – cover art, artwork, design
- Piet Sielck – producer, engineering, mixing, mastering
- Jan Rubach – engineering (drums)
- Anabell Ganske – photography
