= Follow the Blind =

Studio album by Blind Guardian
- Released: 14 April 1989
- Recorded: January–February 1989 at Karo Studios, Münster, West Germany
- Genres: Speed metal; thrash metal; power metal
- Length: 42:00
- Labels: No Remorse, Virgin, Century Media
- Producer: Kalle Trapp

Blind Guardian chronology
Battalions of Fear (1988)	Follow the Blind (1989)	Tales from the Twilight World (1990)

Singles from Follow the Blind
- 1. "Banish from Sanctuary" Released: 1989

Professional ratings
Review scores
Source	Rating
AllMusic	3/5 stars
Rock Hard	(7.5/10)
Metal1	(7.5/10)

Follow the Blind is the second studio album by the German power metal band Blind Guardian. It was released in 1989 and is more in the vein of speed metal, compared to the style that would later define the band's unique sound. Guitarist Marcus Siepen stated that they were "listening to a lot of thrash metal bands like Testament or Forbidden, and that's why Follow the Blind was a bit heavier".

The album was remastered, remixed and re-released on 15 June 2007, with the whole second demo tape, Battalions of Fear, of the band (at the time called Lucifer's Heritage) as part of the bonus tracks. The album was again re-released as part of the A Traveler's Guide to Space and Time boxset with minor adjustments to the mixing and with new mastering. "Banish from Sanctuary" was released as a single to promote this album.

In 2017, Loudwire ranked Follow the Blind as the 12th-best power metal album of all time.

== Track listing ==
LP/vinyl edition
No.	Title	Lyrics	Music	Length
1.	"Inquisition"	N/A	Hansi Kürsch, André Olbrich, Marcus Siepen, Thomas Stauch	0:40
2.	"Banish from Sanctuary"	Kürsch	Kürsch, Olbrich, Siepen, Stauch	5:27
3.	"Damned for All Time"	Kürsch	Kürsch, Olbrich, Siepen, Stauch	4:57
4.	"Follow the Blind"	Kürsch	Kürsch, Olbrich, Siepen, Stauch	7:10
5.	"Hall of the King"	Kürsch	Kürsch, Olbrich, Siepen, Stauch	4:16
6.	"Fast to Madness"	Kürsch	Kürsch, Olbrich, Siepen, Stauch	5:57
7.	"Beyond the Ice" (instrumental)	N/A	Kürsch, Olbrich, Siepen, Stauch	3:28
8.	"Valhalla" (feat. Kai Hansen)	Kürsch	Kürsch, Olbrich, Siepen, Stauch	4:56
9.	"Don't Break the Circle" (Demon cover, CD-only track)	Mal Spooner, Dave Hill	Spooner, Hill	4:28
10.	"Barbara Ann" (The Regents and Beach Boys cover, with a sample of Long Tall Sally by Little Richard at the end.)	Fred Fassert	Fred Fassert	1:43

2007 re-release bonus tracks
No.	Title	Lyrics	Music	Length
11.	"Majesty" (demo version)	Kürsch	Kürsch, Olbrich, Siepen, Stauch	7:16
12.	"Trial by the Archon" (demo version)	N/A	Kürsch, Olbrich, Siepen, Stauch	3:53
13.	"Battalions of Fear" (demo version)	Kürsch	Kürsch, Olbrich, Siepen, Stauch	6:21
14.	"Run for the Night" (demo version)	Kürsch	Kürsch, Olbrich, Siepen, Stauch	4:29

== Lyrical references ==
- "Inquisition" is a version of the Latin phrase Pie Jesu Domine, dona eis requiem (english: O sweet Lord Jesus, grant them rest) chanted as it would be by monks. The phrase forms part of the Roman Catholic Requiem Mass, and is also identical to that which is chanted by the monks in Monty Python and the Holy Grail.
- "Damned for All Time" and "Fast to Madness" are based on Michael Moorcock's characters from Eternal Champion series.
- "Banish from Sanctuary" is based on the life of John the Baptist.
- "Follow the Blind" is based on Stephen King & Peter Straub's The Talisman.
- "Hall of the King" is about the faith and being faithful.
- "Valhalla" references the Mythological Valhalla, and the song is about a wizard who deplores the loss of his people's mythology, hinting at the historical shift from the Norse pagan religion to Christianity.
- "Fast to Madness" contains reference to Elric of Melniboné, the doomed albino Emperor of Melniboné, who finds Stormbringer, a sword created by Chaos, which causes him to be alienated from his close friends and his family, taking souls from each of them, eventually even taking his own soul for fulfilling the hunger of Stormbringer.

== Personnel ==
- Hansi Kürsch – lead vocals, bass
- André Olbrich – lead guitar, backing vocals
- Marcus Siepen – rhythm guitar, backing vocals
- Thomas "Thomen" Stauch – drums

Guest musicians

- Kai Hansen – vocals, guitar solos on "Hall of the King" and "Valhalla"
- Mathias Wiesner – keyboards
- Kalle Trapp – lead guitar and vocals on "Barbara Ann"
- Thomas Hackmann – backing vocals
- Rolf Köhler – backing vocals and lead vocals on "Barbara Ann"
- Aman Malek – backing vocals

Production

- Kalle Trapp – recording, mixing and producing
- van Waay Design – cover art

== Charts ==
Chart (2018)	Peak position
German Albums (Offizielle Top 100)	51
