= Of Doom and Death =

Studio album by Savage Circus
- Released: October 23, 2009
- Genre: Power metal
- Length: 57:33
- Label: Dockyard 1 Records

Savage Circus chronology
Live in Atlanta (2007)	Of Doom and Death (2009)

Professional ratings
Review scores
Source	Rating
Metal Obsession	7/10 stars

Of Doom and Death is the second full-length album by the German power metal band Savage Circus. It was released on October 23, 2009 via Dockyard 1 Records.

== Track listing ==
All music and lyrics written by Savage Circus

No.	Title	Length
1.	"Of Doom and Death"	6:30
2.	"The Ordeal"	7:02
3.	"Devil's Spawn"	6:37
4.	"Chasing the Rainbow"	7:08
5.	"Empire"	7:31
6.	"Ballad of Susan"	5:48
7.	"Legend of Leto II"	7:03
8.	"From the Ashes"	7:27
9.	"Dreamland" (Instrumental)	2:32
Total length:		57:33

Japanese bonus track
No.	Title	Length
10.	"Don't Let Me Be Misunderstood" (Nina Simone cover)	3:52

== Credits ==
- Jens Carlsson – lead vocals
- Emil Norberg – guitar
- Piet Sielck – guitar, backing vocals
- Yenz Leonhardt – bass guitar, backing vocals
- Mike Terrana – drums
