= Interlude (EP) =

EP by Iron Savior
- Released: 25 August 1999
- Recorded: August 1998 at Wacken Open Air (live tracks); May – July 1999 at Powerhouse Studio and Hansen Studio, Hamburg, Germany
- Genres: Power metal, heavy metal
- Length: 53:29
- Label: Noise
- Producer: Piet Sielck

Iron Savior chronology
Unification (1999)	Interlude (1999)	Dark Assault (2001)

Interlude is an EP by the German power metal band Iron Savior, composed of five live tracks, four new songs, and one cover. The live tracks were recorded at the 1998 Wacken Open Air festival during the tour promoting their first album, Iron Savior. The new songs return to the ongoing science fiction story that began on the debut album and continued on the band's second album Unification. "Desert Plains" is a cover of Judas Priest's song from the album Point of Entry. It is the first release to feature drummer Thomas Nack.

== Track listing ==
No.	Title	Lyrics	Music	Length
1.	"Iron Savior" (live at Wacken Open Air 1998)	Piet Sielck	Piet Sielck	4:40
2.	"Brave New World" (live at Wacken Open Air 1998)	Sielck	Sielck	4:44
3.	"Watcher in the Sky" (live at Wacken Open Air 1998)	Sielck, Kai Hansen	Sielck, Hansen	5:39
4.	"Riding on Fire" (live at Wacken Open Air 1998)	Sielck	Sielck	5:26
5.	"For the World" (live at Wacken Open Air 1998)	Sielck	Sielck	6:00
6.	"Contortions of Time"	Sielck	Sielck, Jan-Sören Eckert	6:25
7.	"Touching the Rainbow"	Sielck	Sielck	5:22
8.	"Stonecold"	Sielck	Sielck	4:30
9.	"The Hatchet of War"	Sielck	Sielck, Eckert	5:51
10.	"Desert Plains" (Judas Priest cover)	Glenn Tipton, Rob Halford, K.K. Downing	Tipton, Halford, Downing	4:37

- The Enhanced CD portion of the disc contains a band biography, music player, photos, a recap of the band's ongoing science fiction story, and a video clip of the band performing "Atlantis Falling" at Wacken Open Air 1998.

== Personnel ==
Iron Savior

- Piet Sielck – lead vocals, guitar
- Kai Hansen – guitar, vocals
- Andreas Kück – keyboards, backing vocals
- Jan-Sören Eckert – bass, backing vocals
- Thomas Nack – drums and percussion

Production

- Piet Sielck – producer, engineer, mixing
- Roxanne – recording engineer (live tracks only)
- Ernst Seider – front-of-house engineer (live tracks only)
- Tim Sielck, Rainer Drechsler, Melanie Dreysse, Angela Sielck, Gryta Coates – photography
- Angelika Bardou – layout and artwork
- Mervyn Müller – programming and design (Enhanced CD portion)
