= Savage Circus =

German-Swedish metal band

- Origin: Germany
- Genres: Power metal, Speed metal
- Years active: 2004–present
- Label: Dockyard 1, Century Media
- Members: Thomen Stauch; Thorsten "Toto" Hain; Michael "Mi" Schüren; Axel Morgan
- Past members: Jens Carlsson; Emil Norberg; Piet Sielck; Mike Terrana; Yenz Leonhardt

Savage Circus is a German-Swedish power metal band originally formed as a side project by Thomas "Thomen" Stauch following his departure from Blind Guardian.

== History ==
=== Formation and Dreamland Manor ===
Savage Circus began when Stauch approached his friend Piet Sielck to see if he would be interested in joining Thomen's new project, to which Piet agreed. Piet then introduced Stauch to a Swedish band called Persuader. Stauch was impressed by the band and particularly liked the fact that their vocalist sounded remarkably like Hansi Kürsch. Stauch quickly expressed his desire to have Jens Carlsson, the singer of Persuader, join the band. Jens brought along Persuader guitarist Emil Norberg. Their debut album, Dreamland Manor, was released in August 2005.

=== Of Doom and Death ===
Thomen Stauch was dismissed from the band on 17 August 2007 due to health issues, which led to the cancellation of many shows. In September 2007, Mike Terrana joined the band as the new drummer, and Yenz Leonhardt became a full member at the same time. The release of the follow-up to Dreamland Manor, titled Of Doom and Death, was initially expected in early 2009 but was later postponed to 23 October.

=== Next album ===
In 2011, Piet Sielck left the band to focus more on his primary band, Iron Savior. Upon his departure, Piet indicated that he was entrusting the band's future to members Jens and Emil. In 2012, Mike Terrana left to collaborate with vocalist Tarja Turunen. Subsequently, Yenz Leonhardt also departed, leaving only Jens and Emil as the remaining members. Later in 2012, Thomen Stauch's return to the band was announced, along with the addition of second guitarist Thorsten "Toto" Hain and keyboardist Michael "Mi" Schüren. On 9 February 2014, Jens and Emil announced their departure from the band, citing scheduling conflicts between Savage Circus and their main band, Persuader. Although no official announcement was made, a photo posted on the band's official Facebook page by Toto on 20 March mentioned Axel Morgan as a member of "SC 3.0."

The band is currently working on a third album. As of 18 November 2014, there have been no further updates regarding the band's third studio album. The future of the band remains uncertain, as Thomen has started a new project called Serious Black, Toto has returned to his previous band, Wortmord, and Mi will be extensively touring with Blind Guardian during 2015–2016.

In a 2021 interview, Emil Norberg was asked about the current status of Savage Circus. He responded, "Savage Circus is a closed chapter unless someone throws a lot of money at us, but I would not mind it. That would certainly be fun."

== Background ==
=== Musical Style ===
The musical style of Savage Circus draws parallels to both Blind Guardian and Persuader, characterized by its singing style and multi-layered vocal arrangements. Additionally, the band's first two albums incorporate elements reminiscent of Iron Savior, owing to Piet Sielck's songwriting contributions.

=== Band Name ===
Piet Sielck devised the band's name. The term "circus" reflects the diverse nationalities of the band members, as the group initially comprised both German and Swedish musicians. Conversely, "savage" denotes the "wild" nature of their music.

=== Vocals ===
Jens Carlsson is frequently noted for his vocal similarity to Hansi Kürsch of Blind Guardian. In an interview following the release of Dreamland Manor, Thomen remarked that Hansi appreciated Jens because:

You can hear that he is not copying me. You can really hear that he has a voice like me. If he would copy me I wouldn't like it. But that is really strange, because there would not exist much people in the world that really sound so similar to me. And this guy really sounds similar to me, but you hear that he doesn't copy me, because in the moment where he sings more clear, he sounds totally different than me.

== Band members ==
Current members

- Thomen Stauch – drums (2004–2007, 2012–present)
- Thorsten "Toto" Hain – guitars (2012–present)
- Michael "Mi" Schüren – keyboards (2012–present)
- Axel Morgan – guitars (2014–present)

Former members

- Jens Carlsson – lead vocals (2004–2014)
- Emil Norberg – guitars (2004–2014)
- Piet Sielck – guitars, backing vocals (2004–2011), bass (2004–2006)
- Mike Terrana – drums, percussion (2007–2012)
- Yenz Leonhardt – bass, backing vocals (2006–2012)

Timeline

== Discography ==
=== Studio albums ===
- Dreamland Manor (2005)
- Of Doom and Death (2009)

=== DVDs ===
- Live in Atlanta (2007)
