= Battering Ram (Iron Savior album) =

Studio album by Iron Savior
- Released: 18 June 2004
- Recorded: October 2003 – February 2004 at Powerhouse Studio, Hamburg, Germany
- Genres: Power metal, heavy metal
- Length: 47:52
- Label: Noise / Sanctuary
- Producers: Piet Sielck, Iron Savior

Iron Savior chronology
Condition Red (2002)	Battering Ram (2004)	Megatropolis (2007)

Singles from Battering Ram
- 1. "Time Will Tell" Released: 2004

Battering Ram is the fifth studio album by the German power metal band Iron Savior. It is the first album to feature bassist Yenz Leonhardt.

Unlike the first four albums, Battering Ram is not a concept album, but instead has songs covering a broad variety of topics. However the story of the eponymous Iron Savior is still continued in the songs "Battering Ram", "Tyranny of Steel", "Time Will Tell" and "Machine World". This would dictate the format the band would use to tell the story going forward.

== Track listing ==
All tracks are written by Piet Sielck, except where noted.

No.	Title	Length
1.	"Battering Ram"	4:49
2.	"Stand Against the King" (music by Joachim Küstner, lyrics by Sielck)	5:01
3.	"Tyranny of Steel" (music by Küstner, Sielck; lyrics by Sielck)	4:27
4.	"Time Will Tell"	4:11
5.	"Wings of Deliverance"	4:48
6.	"Break the Curse"	4:01
7.	"Riding Free"	5:15
8.	"Starchaser" (music by Küstner, Sielck; lyrics by Sielck)	4:27
9.	"Machine World"	6:31
10.	"H.M. Powered Man"	4:17

Limited edition bonus track
No.	Title	Length
11.	"The Call" (Yenz Leonhardt, Sielck)	6:14

Japanese edition bonus track
No.	Title	Length
12.	"Living on a Fault Line"	5:52

== Reception ==
Professional ratings
Review scores
Source	Rating
Allmusic	3.5/5 stars
Scream Magazine	5/6 stars
Metal.de	8/10

The album was released to generally favorable reviews, with reviewers citing the band for remaining faithful to the genre of Power Metal. Allmusic gave the album 3 1/2 stars, with Alex Henderson stating that "Everything on this CD sounds like it could have been recorded 20 or 25 years earlier, which is just as well, because Savior's members are undeniably good at what they do. No one will accuse Savior of being the most groundbreaking band in the world, but in terms of quality and craftsmanship, they deliver the goods -- and what they lack in originality, they more than make up for with passion and conviction".

== Personnel ==
Iron Savior

- Piet Sielck – lead vocals, guitar, backing vocals
- Joachim "Piesel" Küstner – guitar, backing vocals
- Yenz Leonhardt – bass, backing vocals
- Thomas Nack – drums, percussion, backing vocals

Additional musicians

- Martin Christian (Paragon) – guitar solo on "Wings of Deliverance"

Production

- Piet Sielck – producer, engineer, mixing, mastering
- Iron Savior – additional production
- Marko Jakobi – cover artwork
- Marisa Jacobi – graphic design
- Olle Carlsson – photography

== Additional information ==
- Drums recorded by Piet Sielck at KARO Studio, Brackel, Germany in October 2003.
