= Brackel =

- Municipality
- Coat of arms

- Location of Brackel within Harburg district
- Interactive map of Brackel
- Location within Germany Location within Lower Saxony
- Coordinates: 53°18′N 10°02′E
- Country: Germany
- State: Lower Saxony
- District: Harburg
- Municipal assoc.: Hanstedt
- Subdivisions: 2

Government
  - Mayor: Henning Schamlott

Area
  - Total: 13.91 km^{2} (5.37 sq mi)
- Elevation: 53 m (174 ft)

Population (2025-12-31)
  - Total: 1,909
  - Density: 137.2/km^{2} (355.4/sq mi)
- Time zone: UTC+01:00 (CET)
  - Summer (DST): UTC+02:00 (CEST)
- Postal codes: 21438
- Dialling codes: 04185
- Vehicle registration: WL
- Website: www.brackel.de

Brackel (German pronunciation: [ˈbʁaːkl̩]) is a municipality in the district of Harburg, in Lower Saxony, Germany.
