= Iron Savior =

German power metal band

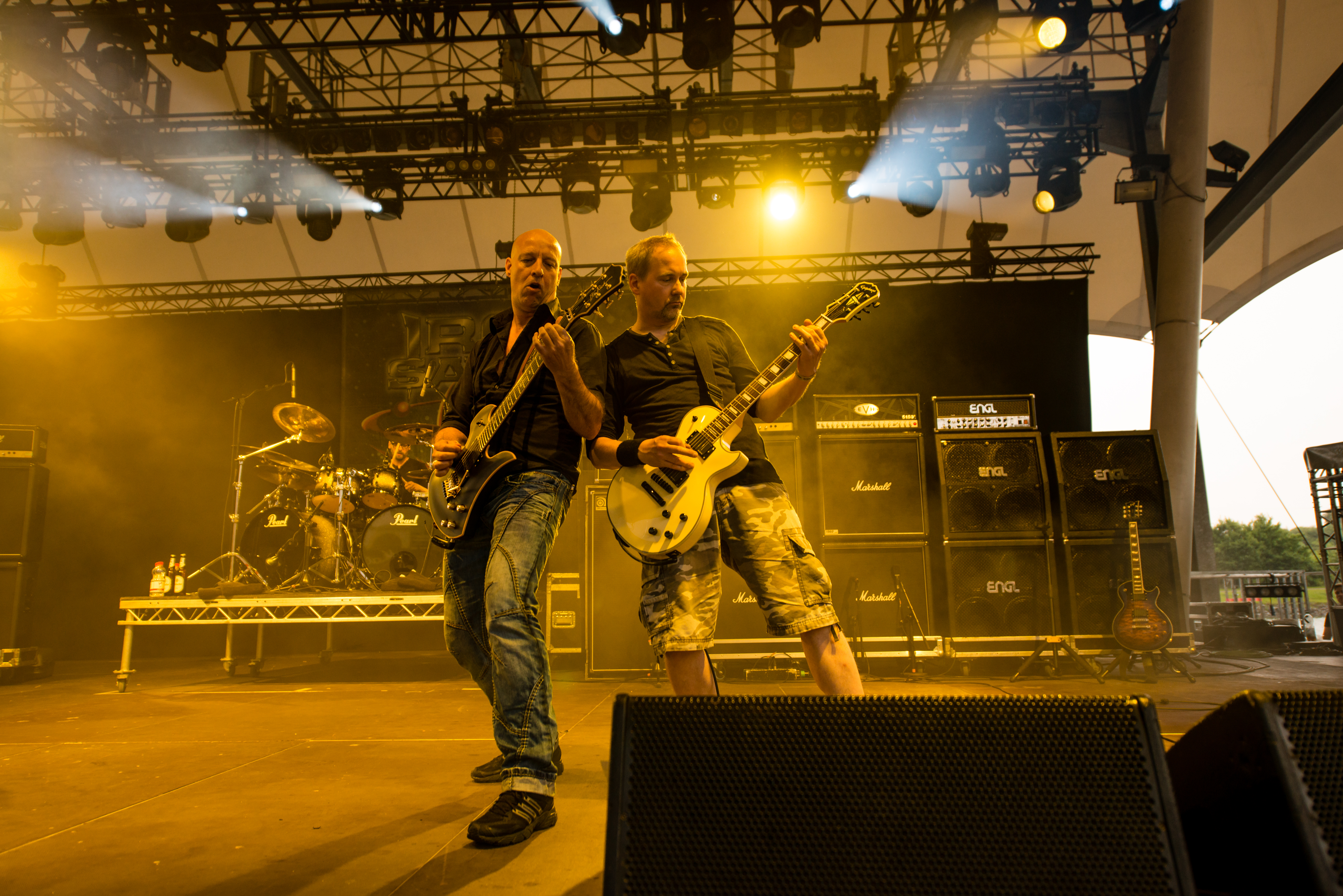
- Iron Savior at Rock Hard Festival 2014

Background information
- Origin: Hamburg, Germany
- Genres: Heavy metal, power metal, speed metal
- Years active: 1996–present
- Labels: AFM (current); Dockyard 1; Noise
- Members: Piet Sielck; Joachim "Piesel" Küstner; Patrick Klose; Patrick Opitz
- Past members: Kai Hansen; Thomen Stauch; Dan Zimmermann; Andreas Kück; Yenz Leonhardt; Thomas Nack; Jan-S Eckert
- Website: iron-savior.com

Iron Savior is a German heavy metal/power metal band that was formed in Hamburg in 1996. Following a period of several years working behind the scenes in music production, multi-instrumentalist and producer/engineer Piet Sielck joined with former Helloween bandmate Kai Hansen and then-drummer for Blind Guardian, Thomen Stauch in a new project that would blend power metal with a high-concept science fiction story. The band's debut album Iron Savior introduced the story that would be told over the course of multiple albums, featuring a self-aware space vessel called the Iron Savior and its relationship to the mythical lost civilization of Atlantis.

Critics have compared Iron Savior's sound and musical approach to classic heavy metal bands like Judas Priest, Iron Maiden, and Queensrÿche. Kai Hansen's presence in the band brought to the Iron Savior albums on which he appeared a style heavily influenced by Gamma Ray and Helloween.

Since its inception, Iron Savior has released 16 studio albums (including three re-recording albums), one cover album, two EPs, three singles and one live album.

Despite numerous lineup changes, Piet has continued to direct the band and is currently the only remaining founding member.

== Members ==
=== Current band members ===
- Piet Sielck – lead vocals, guitar, keyboards (1996–present), bass (1996)
- Joachim "Piesel" Küstner – guitar, backing vocals (2000–present)
- Patrick Klose – drums (2017–present)
- Patrick Opitz – bass, backing vocals (2025–present)

=== Former band members ===
- Kai Hansen – guitar, vocals (1996–2001)
- Thomen Stauch – drums (1996–1998)
- Andreas Kück – keyboards, backing vocals (1998–2003)
- Dan Zimmermann – drums (1998–1999)
- Thomas Nack – drums (1999–2017; touring member: 1997–1998)
- Yenz Leonhardt – bass, backing vocals (2003–2011)
- Jan-Sören Eckert – bass, vocals (1997–2003, 2011–2025)

== Discography ==
=== Albums ===
- Iron Savior (1997)
- Unification (1999)
- Dark Assault (2001)
- Condition Red (2002)
- Battering Ram (2004)
- Megatropolis (2007) (re-recorded in 2015 as Megatropolis 2.0)
- The Landing (2011)
- Rise of the Hero (2014)
- Titancraft (2016)
- Reforged – Riding on Fire (2017)
- Kill or Get Killed (2019)
- Skycrest (2020)
- Reforged – Ironbound (2022)
- Firestar (2023)
- Reforged – Machine World (2025)
- Deathbringer (2026)

=== Extended plays ===
- Coming Home (1998)
- Interlude (1999)
- I've Been to Hell (2000)
- Curse of the Machinery (2023)

=== Live album ===
- Live at the Final Frontier (2015)

=== Cover album ===
- Awesome Anthems of the Galaxy (2026)

=== Singles ===
- Titans of Our Time (2002)
- Time Will Tell (2004)
- In the Realm of Heavy Metal (2023)
- Firestar (2023)
- Through the Fires of Hell (2023)
- Raising Hell (2024)
- Fame (2025)
- Forever Young (2025)
- Relax (2026)
- Take On Me (2026)
