= Unification (album) =

Studio album by Iron Savior
- Released: 10 January 1999
- Recorded: June – September 1998 at Powerhouse Studio, KARO Studio, and Hansen Studio
- Genre: Power metal, heavy metal
- Length: 73:11
- Label: Noise
- Producer: Piet Sielck, Iron Savior

Iron Savior chronology
Iron Savior (1997)	Unification (1999)	Interlude (1999)

Unification is the second studio album by the German power metal band Iron Savior. It continues the science fiction story that began on the first album Iron Savior. It is the only album to feature former Gamma Ray and Freedom Call drummer Dan Zimmermann.

== Story ==
In the year 2110, Earth is controlled by the Iron Savior. The gigantic machine - built in Atlantis to defend the lost continent against its enemies, the so-called Alliance - still is mistaken. The computer-unit analysis identifies man as the destroyer of Atlantis. So it continues to carry out its prime directive: Protect Atlantis and conquer the Alliance.

On Earth only a few people managed to hide from the bloodhounds of the Savior in the former Earth-Defense-Headquarters (E.D.H.) underneath the everlasting ice of Greenland. The machine, from the very first moment of its arrival, was transmitting signals directly to the Atlantic Ocean, North Africa, South America, and the Easter Islands. This behavior led some people to the "theory of Atlantis". After major research for anything related to the old myth, some artifacts were found on the Azores and on the Easter Islands. The dig on the Easter Islands uncovered something like the entrance to an ancient structure of unknown purpose. Shielded and protected by force fields of unknown sources, the station could not be entered by anybody yet. But all of a sudden another transmission - similar to the Savior's transmission but yet different - was detected. Sensors indicated that the source must be located right in the heart of the ancient structure.

The attempts to enter the station made the last Atlantian on Earth awake from his 300,000 year long stasis sleep. Now the "Sleeper" is the last member alive of the Atlantian Iron Savior Defense program. But when he transmitted the secret codes to direct the controls of the Savior to his station, something unexpected happened. The computer unit refused to obey his command. It almost appeared to him, as if the unit is conscious - with a will of its own, just like an organic life form.

The awakening of the sleeper and the contact with the last Atlantian on Earth brought a lot of clarity and turned the "theory of Atlantis" into a hard fact. On the other hand, the situation did not change at all since the machine seems to disobey the orders of its creators. The only chance to fee mankind from the Savior is now awake to bio unit. But even this seems doubtful if the robot in deed developed a consciousness and now acts like a being with emotions and the hunger for power. It is very much likely that the computer will also disobey the orders of the bio unit. So the Savior needs to be defeated or destroyed, which at this time seems to be impossible.

In this situation a big fleet of alien vessels enters the Solar System. They have come from the distant planet of Calderis to investigate the transmission of the Iron Savior. The Calderins are the descendants of the Atlantian fugitives. Their forefathers left the dying civilization of Atlantis to find a new home in the vastness of space. But over the millennia they forgot about their origin and the Old World became a myth of legends and tales. But the Calderins never gave up the search although thousands of expeditions returned to Calderis without a clue. But this time they have reached their final destiny.

Together with the sleeper mankind is unable to make contact and explain the fatal mistake of the Savior. So now with the unexpected help from the stars, Earth will fight the final battle and it seems that the Savior can be defeated.

The time of Unification for all mankind is about to come.

== Track listing ==
All tracks are written by Piet Sielck, except where noted

No.	Title	Length
1.	"Coming Home"	5:25
2.	"Starborn"	4:36
3.	"Deadly Sleep" (Kai Hansen)	5:09
4.	"Forces of Rage"	5:46
5.	"Captain's Log"	1:02
6.	"Brothers (Of the Past)"	4:42
7.	"Eye to Eye"	5:51
8.	"Mind Over Matter"	5:34
9.	"Prisoner of the Void"	4:43
10.	"The Battle"	5:46
11.	"Unchained"	6:09
12.	"Forevermore" (Hansen)	5:15

North American and European edition bonus tracks
No.	Title	Writer(s)	Length
1.	"Gorgar (Version '98)" (Helloween cover)	Hansen	4:06
2.	"Neon Knights" (Black Sabbath cover)	Geezer Butler, Ronnie James Dio, Tony Iommi, Bill Ward	3:53
3.	"Dragonslayer" (performed by Excelsis)	Excelsis	5:24

Japanese bonus track
No.	Title	Writer(s)	Length
1.	"Metal Invaders (Version '98)" (Helloween cover)	Hansen	3:48

== Trivia ==
Swiss power metal band Excelsis won a competition during Iron Savior's 1998 Atlantis Falling tour, for their contribution of their song "Dragonslayer", which earned them a featured guest spot on the album.

== Personnel ==
Iron Savior

- Piet Sielck – lead vocals, backing vocals, guitar
- Kai Hansen – guitar, vocals
- Andreas Kück – keyboards, backing vocals
- Jan-Sören Eckert – bass, backing vocals, additional lead vocals on "Unchained"
- Dan Zimmermann – drums

Additional musicians

- Uwe Lulis – guitar solo on "The Battle"
- Claudia Solms – female choir vocals on "Forevermore"
- Jason Breitweg – narrator's voice on "Captain's Log"

Production

- Piet Sielck – producer, engineer, mixing
- Kai Hansen – additional mixing on "Deadly Sleep"
- Iron Savior – additional production
- Kristian Huitula – cover artwork
- Marisa Jacobi – other artwork
- Melanie Dreysse – photos

== Notes ==
1. Iron Savior Unification liner notes: "Excelsis, winner of the RockHard band battle competition during the Atlantis Falling tour '98."
