= Iron Savior (album) =

Studio album by Iron Savior
- Released: 30 June 1997
- Recorded: October 1996 – February 1997 at Powerhouse Studio and Hansen Studio
- Genre: Power metal, heavy metal
- Length: 52:43
- Label: Noise
- Producer: Piet Sielck

Iron Savior chronology
Iron Savior (1997)	Unification (1999)

Professional ratings
Review scores
Source	Rating
Allmusic	2.5/5 stars

Iron Savior is the debut studio album by the German power metal band Iron Savior. It was released in 1997 on Noise Records. It is the only album to feature former Blind Guardian drummer Thomen Stauch.

== Story ==
The Iron Savior is a gigantic vessel in the orbit of the planet Earth. It is controlled by an immortal human brain – the bio-unit – which is hooked to a mighty computer system that carries out its orders and controls the vessel’s daily routine. The Iron Savior was built and designed by the ancient civilisation of Atlantis to defend themselves against the deadly threat of the so called Alliance.

Except the lost continent of Atlantis, all land was controlled and dominated by this global force. In these parts of the world moral evolution took a different path. Gaining ultimate power was their only focus. Ruled by pure egoism, where killing and betraying were legal methods to achieve welfare, this civilisation never developed a social spirit. To care and provide for themselves as well as possible was their only existing law. For millennia the balance of power between Atlantis and the Alliance made war useless since the Atlantean weapon technology was more developed.

But suddenly this balance was about to change and an Alliance attack on Atlantis seemed to become possible. In this situation, Atlantis developed a global defence project based on a huge vessel in Earth orbit, the Iron Savior. Equipped with the latest technology and enormous firepower this project was supposed to regain the old balance of power again.

But then the dream of a peaceful co-existence was broken. A traitor sold the secret codes to the Alliance. With these codes the Alliance managed to paralyse the Savior’s bio-unit and to take control over the computer. In a devastating assault the defender turned into a dreadful assailant and the moon colony of Atlantis was turned to dust.

But the war was not lost yet. A brave landing team managed to board the Iron Savior and to regain control. In a race against time they sent the vessel out into space to make a second misuse by the Alliance impossible. They programmed a course that should bring the Savior back to the Sol system 350,000 years later in the hope that the conflict will be resolved and Earth would be united. For those men it was a final journey of no return. Before they died out in the cold a prime directive for all actions was programmed into the computer systems in case the Alliance would still exist: Protect Atlantis and conquer the Alliance. This directive could only be deactivated by the proper Atlantean security code sequences.

But it was already too late to stop the war. In grim and rage the Alliance pushed their buttons and in a final atomic strike Atlantis was destroyed completely and was lost in the seas forever.

But the rest of the world was also affected by this catastrophe. Earthquakes, volcanic eruptions, atomic fallout and dramatic changes in climate turned Earth into a living hell. Those who survived, slowly, from generation to generation, degenerated more and more. Finally evolution was thrown back into the stone age where the dawning of another mankind began...

Now in the year 2108 the Iron Savior returned to Earth and is confronted with a scenario where the civilisation of Atlantis no longer exists. All attempts to contact possible survivors failed. The bio-unit is still paralysed and unable to make decisions. So the computer still in charge draws the fatal conclusion that Atlantis was destroyed by the Alliance who still exists and rules the planet. With the logic of a lifeless machine the Iron Savior carries out its Prime directive:

PROTECT ATLANTIS AND CONQUER THE ALLIANCE.

== Track listing ==
All tracks are written by Piet Sielck, except where noted.

No.	Title	Length
1.	"The Arrival"	1:08
2.	"Atlantis Falling"	4:34
3.	"Brave New World"	4:32
4.	"Iron Savior"	4:26
5.	"Riding on Fire"	4:54
6.	"Break It Up"	5:01
7.	"Assailant"	4:18
8.	"Children of the Wasteland"	4:48
9.	"Protect the Law"	4:16
10.	"Watcher in the Sky" (written by Piet Sielck and Kai Hansen)	5:21
11.	"For the World"	5:24
12.	"This Flight Tonight" (Nazareth cover; written by Joni Mitchell)	3:56

Japanese bonus track
No.	Title	Writer(s)	Length
1.	"The Rage" (Judas Priest cover)	Glenn Tipton, Rob Halford, K.K. Downing	4:50

== Trivia ==
The same recording of "Watcher in the Sky" was used on Gamma Ray's Valley of the Kings EP, which was also released in 1997. The version used on Gamma Ray's Somewhere Out in Space album is a different recording, although both, Sielck and Stauch also performed on that one.

== Personnel ==
Iron Savior

- Piet Sielck – vocals, guitar, bass, keyboards, production
- Kai Hansen – guitar, vocals, additional production
- Thomen Stauch – drums, additional production

Additional musicians

- Hansi Kürsch – vocals on "For the World"
- Dirk Schlächter – additional bass
- Henne – additional backing vocals on "Riding on Fire"

Production

- Rüdiger Beissert – assistant engineer
- Rainer Drechsler – photos
- Henny – cover artwork and logo design
- Kai and Uwe Karczewski – original logo design
