= Piet Sielck =

German musician and record producer

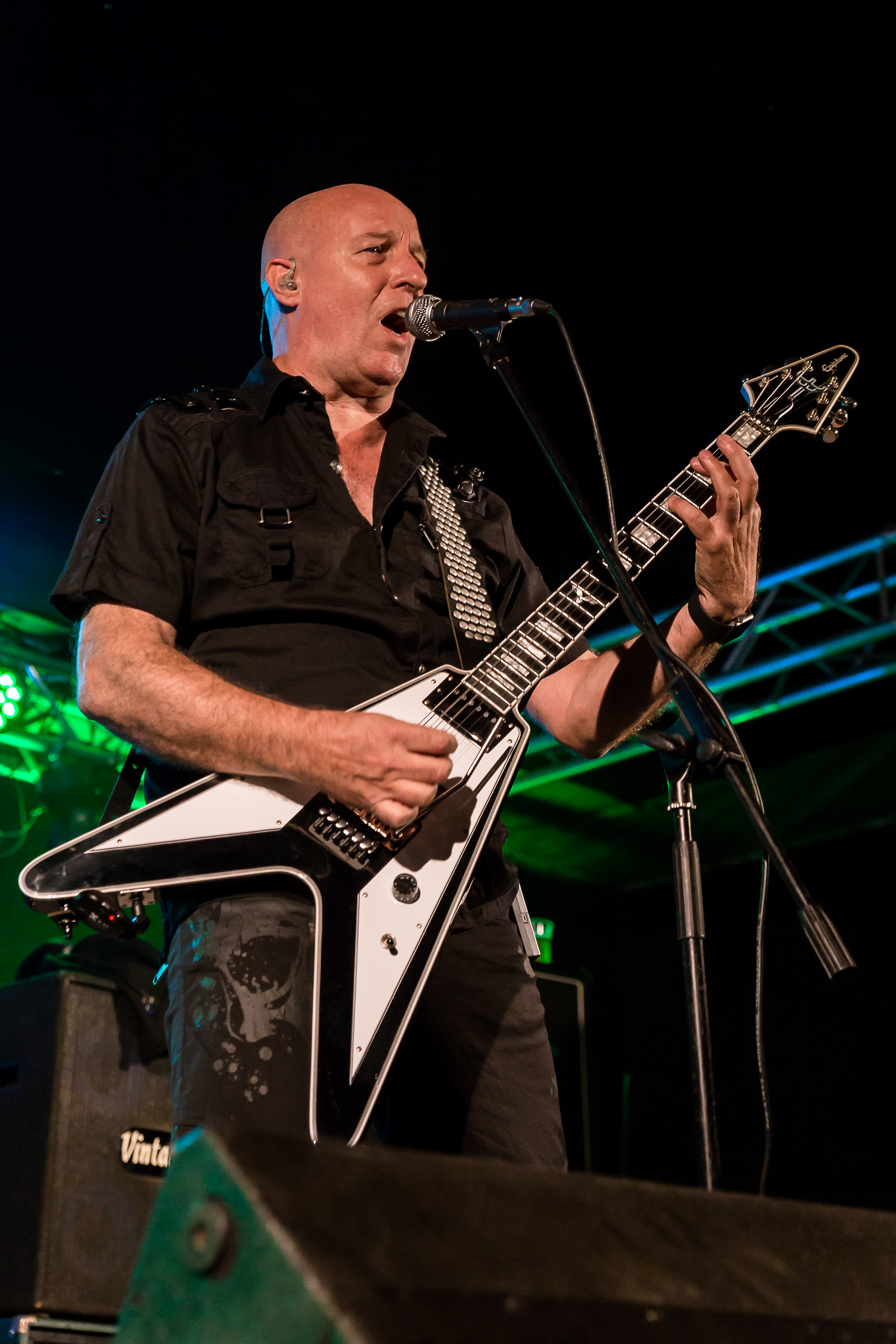
- Sielck performing in 2022

Background information
- Born: 14 November 1964 (age 61); Hamburg, Germany
- Genres: Power metal, heavy metal
- Occupation(s): Musician, record producer, songwriter
- Instrument(s): Vocals, guitar, keyboards
- Years active: 1982–present
- Member of: Iron Savior
- Formerly of: Savage Circus

Piet Sielck (born 14 November 1964) is a German guitarist, singer and record producer. He is the frontman of the power metal band Iron Savior as well as owner of the studio Powerhouse in Hamburg.

== Early life ==
Born in Hamburg, Sielck started playing piano at the age of eight and bass at the age of ten, but realized after half a year that bass was not his favourite instrument and took up the guitar.

== Career ==
Sielck's first band was Gentry, which he formed along with Kai Hansen. In 1982, he left the band and worked first as a technician, then traveled for one year to Los Angeles. After his return, he began his career as a producer; his first production was Heading for Tomorrow, the debut album of Gamma Ray, the new band of his old friend Hansen. Other bands with which he cooperated are Uriah Heep, Saxon, and Blind Guardian. He maintains a good relationship with many bands, having participated in several of their albums as a guest musician.

In 1996, Sielck created his own band, Iron Savior, together with Hansen and Blind Guardian's then-drummer Thomen Stauch. Those two would step out later, but Sielck continued the band with new musicians.

In 2004, he agreed to produce and participate as a guitarist/bassist in Stauch's new band Savage Circus. He left Savage Circus in December 2011 to focus on Iron Savior exclusively again.

== Discography ==
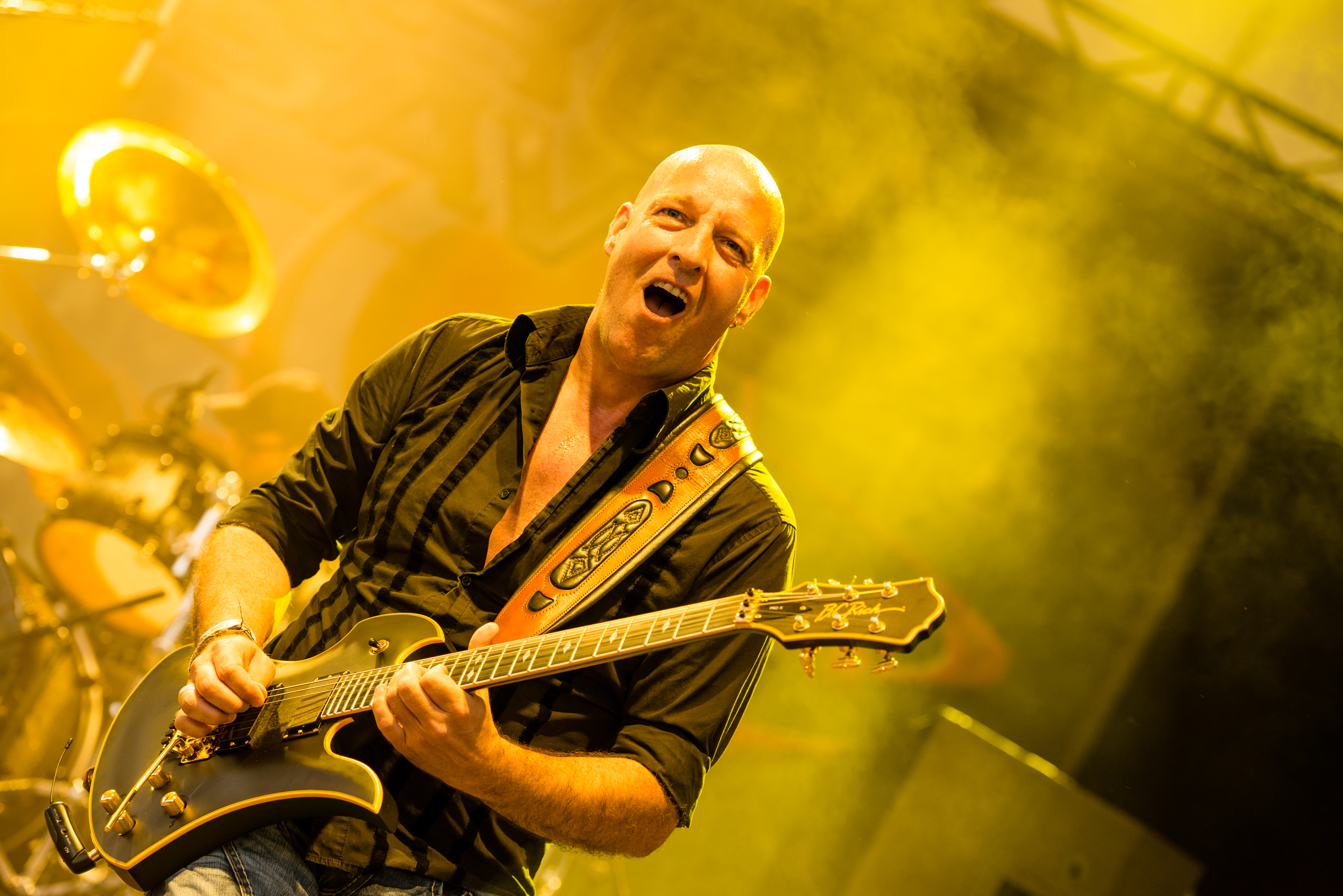
Sielck with Iron Savior in 2014

=== Iron Savior ===
- Iron Savior (1997)
- Coming Home (EP, 1998)
- Unification (1998)
- Interlude (EP, 1999)
- I've Been to Hell (single, 2000)
- Dark Assault (2001)
- Condition Red (2002)
- Battering Ram (2004)
- Megatropolis (2007)
- The Landing (2011)
- Rise of the Hero (2014)
- Titancraft (2016)
- Reforged – Riding on Fire (2017)
- Kill or Get Killed (2019)
- Skycrest (2020)
- Reforged - Ironbound (2019)
- Firestar (2023)
- Reforged - Machine World (2025)

=== Savage Circus ===
- Dreamland Manor (2005)
- Of Doom and Death (2009)

=== Guest recording ===
- Gamma Ray – Sigh No More (backing vocals, 1991)
- Hansen – XXX: 30 Years of Metal (2016)
