= Mando Diao discography =

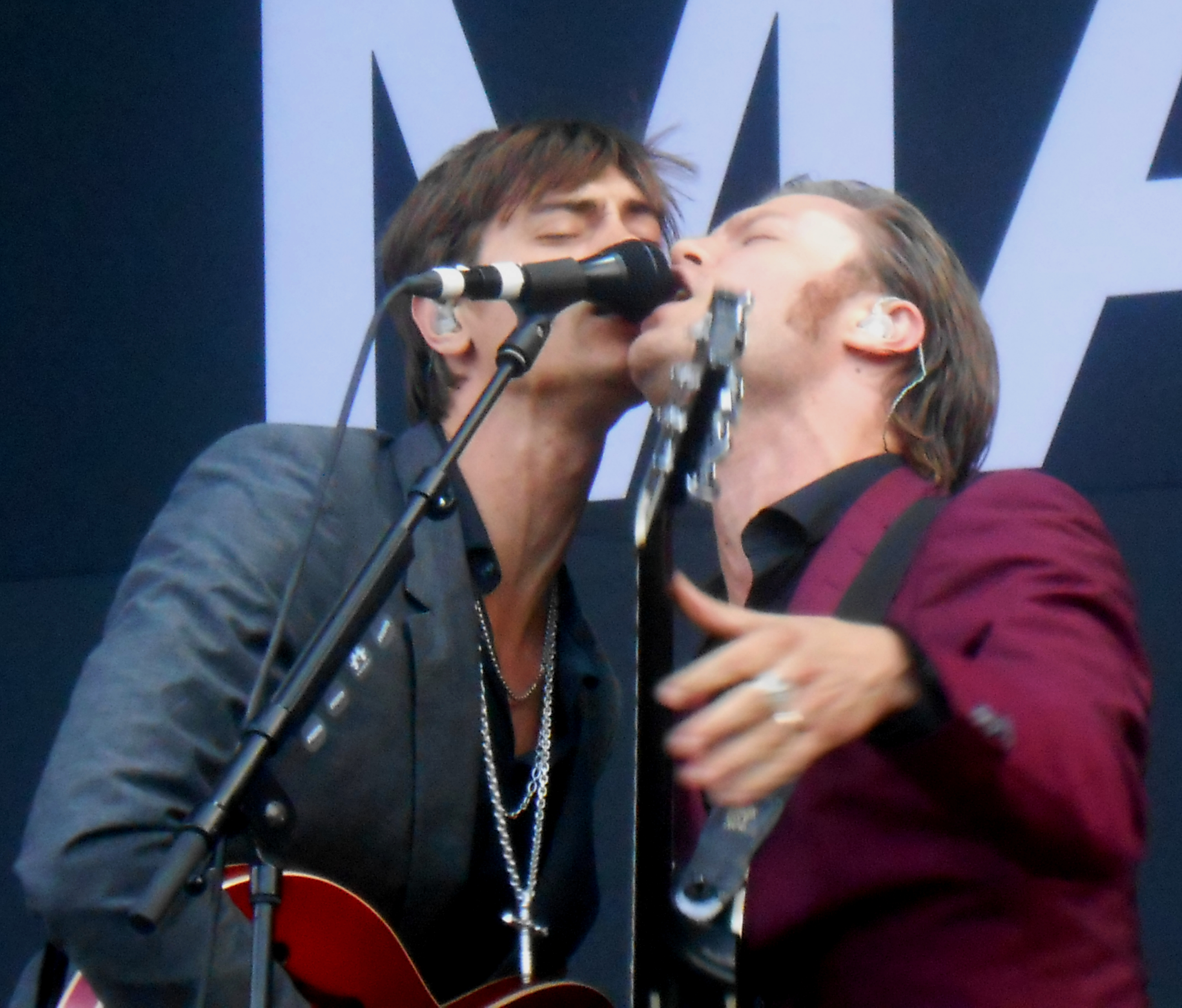
- Mando Diao live in Budapest
- Studio albums: 10
- Extended plays: 3
- Live albums: 1
- Compilation albums: 3
- Singles: 30
- Music videos: 28
- Guest appearances: 9
- DVDs: 2

The discography of the Swedish indie rock band Mando Diao currently consists of ten studio albums, twenty-nine singles, three compilation albums and three extended plays (EPs). The band is composed of Gustaf Norén, Björn Dixgård, Carl-Johan Fogelklou and Mats Björke.

== Albums ==
=== Studio albums ===
List of studio albums, with selected chart positions and certifications
Title	Album details	Peak chart positions							Certifications
Title	Album details	SWE	AUT	GER	JPN	NLD	NOR	SWI	Certifications
Bring 'Em In	Released: October 2002; Label: EMI/Majesty/Mute	5	—	—	22	— (Note: Bring 'Em In did not enter the Dutch Album Top 100, but entered the Dutch Alternative Top 30 chart at number 17.)	—	—	JPN: Gold; SWE: Gold
Hurricane Bar	Released: 22 September 2004; Label: Majesty/Mute	6	25	18	23	—	—	26	AUT: Gold; GER: Gold
Ode to Ochrasy	Released: 25 August 2006; Label: Majesty/Mute	7	2	3	30	—	—	5	AUT: Gold; GER: Gold
Never Seen the Light of Day	Released: 22 October 2007; Label: EMI	9	10	9	—	—	—	10	
Give Me Fire!	Released: 13 February 2009; Label: Universal	2	1	1	—	38	—	1	AUT: Gold; GER: Platinum
Infruset	Released: 31 October 2012; Label: Sony/Universal	1	—	—	—	—	33	97	SWE: 4× Platinum
Ælita	Released: 2 May 2014; Label: Universal	1	14	6	—	—	—	8	
Good Times	Released: 12 May 2017; Label: BMG	10	16	11	—	—	—	8	
Bang	Released: 18 October 2019; Label: BMG	4	26	17	—	—	—	50	
I soldnedgången	Released: 12 March 2020; Label: Playground Music	2	—	—	—	—	—	—	SWE: Gold
"—" denotes releases that did not chart or was not released.

=== Live albums ===
List of live albums, with selected chart positions and certifications
Title	Album details	Peak chart positions				Certifications
Title	Album details	SWE	AUT	GER	SWI	Certifications
Above and Beyond – MTV Unplugged	Released: 12 November 2010; Label: Universal	46	13	6	27	GER: Gold

=== Compilation albums ===
List of compilation albums, with selected chart positions
Title	Album details	Peak chart positions			
Title	Album details	SWE	AUT	GER	SWI
The Malevolence of Mando Diao	Released: 12 October 2009; Label: EMI	30	67	58	—
Ghosts&Phantoms	Released: 27 December 2011/January 2012; Label: Musica de la Santa	—	—	—	—
Greatest Hits Volume 1	Released: 6 January 2012; Label: EMI/Capitol	8	60	35	40
"—" denotes releases that did not chart or was not released.

== EPs ==
List of EPs, with selected chart positions
Title	EP details	Peak chart positions		
Title	EP details	SWE	GER	UK
Motown Blood EP	Released: 2002; Label: Majesty/Mute	37	—	—
Paralyzed EP	Released: 24 February 2004; Label: Majesty/Mute	—	—	140
Mean Street EP	Released: 11 June 2009; Label: Universal	—	89	—
All the People	Released: 5 June 2020; Label: Playground Music	—	—	—
"—" denotes releases that did not chart or was not released.

== Singles ==
Title	Year	Peak chart positions										Certifications	Album
Title	Year	SWE	AUT	CZ	FIN	GER	NLD	SCO	SK	SWI	UK	Certifications	Album
"Mr. Moon"	2002	33	—	—	—	—	—	—	—	—	—		Bring 'Em In
"The Band"	2002	52	—	—	—	—	—	—	—	—	—		Bring 'Em In
"Sheepdog"	2003	—	—	—	—	—	—	—	—	—	—		Bring 'Em In
"Paralyzed"	2003	—	—	—	—	—	—	—	—	—	140		Bring 'Em In
"Clean Town"	2004	29	—	—	—	—	—	—	—	—	—		Hurricane Bar
"Down in the Past"	2004	—	—	—	—	87	—	—	—	—	238		Hurricane Bar
"You Can't Steal My Love"	2005	—	—	—	—	—	—	—	—	—	73		Hurricane Bar
"God Knows"	2005	—	—	—	—	90	—	59	—	—	64		Hurricane Bar
"Long Before Rock 'n' Roll"	2006	16	53	—	—	53	—	—	—	69	—		Ode to Ochrasy
"Good Morning, Herr Horst"	2006	—	—	—	—	—	—	—	—	—	—		Ode to Ochrasy
"TV & Me"	2007	—	—	—	—	—	—	—	—	—	—		Ode to Ochrasy
"The Wildfire (If It Was True)"	2007	—	—	—	—	—	—	—	—	—	—		Ode to Ochrasy
"Ochrasy"	2007	—	—	—	—	—	—	—	—	—	—		Ode to Ochrasy
"If I Don't Live Today, I Might Be Here Tomorrow"	2007	15	—	—	—	—	—	—	—	—	—		Never Seen the Light of Day
"Never Seen the Light of Day"	2007	34	—	—	—	—	—	—	—	—	—		Never Seen the Light of Day
"Train on Fire"	2008	—	—	—	—	—	—	—	—	—	—		Never Seen the Light of Day
"Dance with Somebody"	2009	4	1	12	12	2	9	—	1	3	—		Give Me Fire!
"Gloria"	2009	12	32	—	—	33	77	—	—	39	—		Give Me Fire!
"The Quarry"	2009	—	—	—	—	—	—	—	—	—	—		The Malevolence of Mando Diao
"Nothing Without You"	2009	—	—	—	—	76	—	—	—	—	—		Give Me Fire! (Special Ltd. Winter Edition)
"Down in the Past (MTV Unplugged)"	2010	—	58	—	—	53	—	—	—	—	—		MTV Unplugged – Above and Beyond
"Christmas Could Have Been Good"	2011	97	—	—	—	—	—	—	—	—	—		Greatest Hits Volume 1
"Strövtåg i hembygden"	2012	18	—	—	—	—	—	—	—	—	—		Infruset
"I ungdomen"	2012	—	—	—	—	—	—	—	—	—	—		Infruset
"En sångarsaga"	2012	57	—	—	—	—	—	—	—	—	—		Infruset
"Black Saturday"	2014	—	28	—	— (Note: "Black Saturday" did not enter the Finnish Singles Chart, but peaked at number 66 on the Finland Radio Chart.)	8	—	—	—	21	—		Ælita
"Sweet Wet Dreams"	2014	—	—	—	—	—	—	—	—	— (Note: "Sweet Wet Dreams" did not enter the Swiss Singles chart, but charted at number 88 on the Swiss Airplay chart.)	—		Ælita
"Love Last Forever"	2015	94	—	—	—	—	—	—	—	—	—	SWE: Gold	Ælita
"Shake"	2017	—	—	—	—	—	—	—	—	— (Note: "Shake" did not enter the Swiss Singles chart, but charted at number 65 on the Swiss Airplay chart.)	—		Good Times
"All the Things"	2017	—	—	—	—	—	—	—	—	—	—		Good Times
"Good Times"	2017	—	—	—	—	—	—	—	—	—	—		Good Times
"One Last Fire"	2019	—	—	—	—	—	—	—	—	—	—		Bang
"Long Long Way"	2019	— (Note: "Long Long Way" did not enter the Sverigetopplistan Top 100 Singles chart, but peaked at number 20 on the Sverigetopplistan Heatseeker chart.)	—	—	—	—	—	—	—	—	—		Bang
"Själens skrubbsår"	2020	—	—	—	—	—	—	—	—	—	—		I soldnedgången
"Långsamt"	2020	81	—	—	—	—	—	—	—	—	—		I soldnedgången
"—" denotes releases that did not chart or was not released.

== Guest appearances ==
- "God Knows" was featured in FIFA 06 by EA Sports.
- "Down in the Past" was featured in 2006 FIFA World Cup Germany by EA Sports, and NHL 06 by EA Sports.
- "The Wildfire (If It Was True)" was featured in NHL 08 by EA Sports.
- "Sheepdog" was featured in UK teen drama Skins.
- "Sweet Ride" was featured in the 2005 film The Ringer.
- "Mean Street" was featured on Need for Speed: Shift by EA Games.

== Music videos ==
Year	Title	Director(s)	Album
2002	"Mr. Moon"	Magnus Härdner	Bring 'Em In
2002	"The Band"	Håkan Schüler	Bring 'Em In
2003	"Sheepdog"	Pontus Andersson	Bring 'Em In
2003	"Paralyzed"	Håkan Schüler	Bring 'Em In
2004	"Clean Town"	Amir Chamdin	Hurricane Bar
2004	"God Knows"	Johan Torell & John Nordqvist	Hurricane Bar
2004	"Down in the Past"	Kristoffer Diös	Hurricane Bar
2005	"You Can't Steal My Love"	Mauricio Molinari	Hurricane Bar
2006	"Long Before Rock 'N' Roll"	Daniel Eskils	Ode to Ochrasy
2006	"Good Morning, Herr Horst"	Lovisa Inserra	Ode to Ochrasy
2006	"TV & Me"	Kalle Haglund	Ode to Ochrasy
2007	"The Wildfire (If It Was True)"	Gilly Barnes	Ode to Ochrasy
2007	"Ochrasy"	Lovisa Inserra	Ode to Ochrasy
2007	"If I Don't Live Today, I Might Be Here Tomorrow"	Andreas Nilsson	Never Seen the Light of Day
2007	"Never Seen the Light of Day"	Marcus Engstrand	Never Seen the Light of Day
2008	"Train on Fire"	John Boisen & Björn Fävremark	Never Seen the Light of Day
2008	"Dance with Somebody"	Matt Wignall & Vern Moen	Give Me Fire!
2009	"Gloria"	Jörn Heitmann	Give Me Fire!
2009	"Mean Street"	Matt Wignall	Give Me Fire!
2009	"Nothing Without You"	Matt Wignall	Give Me Fire! (Special Ltd.Winter Edition)
2010	"Down in the Past (MTV Unplugged)"	Matt Wignall	MTV Unplugged – Above and Beyond
2013	"Säv, säv, susa"		Infruset
2014	"Black Saturday"	Tim Emrem	Ælita
2014	"Sweet Wet Dreams"	Tim Emrem	Ælita
2014	"Money Doesn't Make You a Man"	Tim Emrem	Ælita
2017	"Shake"		Good Times
2017	"All the Things"		Good Times
2017	"Good Times"		Good Times

== DVDs ==
- Down in the Past (2006)
- Above and Beyond – MTV Unplugged (2010)
