= Greatest Hits Volume 1 (Mando Diao album) =

Greatest hits album by Mando Diao
- Released: 5 January 2012
- Genre: Alternative rock, garage rock
- Length: 79:38
- Label: Capitol Records, EMI

Mando Diao chronology
| Ghosts&Phantoms (2012) | Greatest Hits Volume 1 (2012) | Infruset (2012) |

Greatest Hits Volume 1 is a greatest hits compilation released in January 2012 by Swedish rock band Mando Diao. The album features select tracks from their first six studio albums. There is one previously unreleased song on the compilation: Christmas Could Have Been Good, which was released digitally on 2 December 2011.

The Bonus DVD also features (part of) a live gig from the 2006 Ode to Ochrasy Tour at Zenith in Munich, as well as 18 of their 22 music videos (omitting those to "Gloria", "Mean Street", "Nothing Without You" & "Down In The Past – MTV unplugged") to date.

== Track listing ==
| No. | Title | Length |
|---|---|---|
| 1. | "Dance with Somebody" (Radio Version) | 4:02 |
| 2. | "Long Before Rock 'n' Roll" (Album Version) | 2:53 |
| 3. | "Down in the Past" (Album Version) | 3:59 |
| 4. | "Sheepdog" (Single-/Video Version) | 3:53 |
| 5. | "God Knows" (Album Version) | 3:52 |
| 6. | "Welcome Home, Luc Robitaille" (Edit) | 4:07 |
| 7. | "Gloria" (Album Version) | 4:19 |
| 8. | "If I Don't Live Today, Then I Might Be Here Tomorrow" (Album Version) | 2:02 |
| 9. | "Mean Street" (Album Version) | 4:31 |
| 10. | "The Band" (Album Version) | 3:18 |
| 11. | "Never Seen the Light of Day" (Album Version) | 4:15 |
| 12. | "TV & Me" (Album Version) | 3:48 |
| 13. | "You Can't Steal My Love" (Video Edit) | 3:17 |
| 14. | "Mr. Moon" (Album Version) | 3:30 |
| 15. | "All My Senses" (Album Version) | 4:12 |
| 16. | "Paralyzed" (Album Version) | 4:09 |
| 17. | "Christmas Could Have Been Good" (NEW SONG) | 4:10 |
| 18. | "Ochrasy" (Album Version) | 3:19 |
| 19. | "Clean Town" (Album Version) | 3:34 |
| 20. | "Good Morning, Herr Horst" (Album Version) | 1:59 |
| 21. | "Motown Blood" (Album Version) | 2:04 |
| 22. | "Dalarna" (Edit w/ early fade) | 4:25 |
| Total length: | | 1:19:38 |

=== Bonus DVD: Live at Zenith, Munich – Ode to Ochrasy Tour 2006 ===
| No. | Title | Length |
|---|---|---|
| 1. | "Welcome Home, Luc Robitaille" |
| 2. | "Motown Blood" |
| 3. | "Paralyzed" |
| 4. | "Amsterdam" |
| 5. | "TV & Me" |
| 6. | "Tony Zoulias (Lustful Life)" |
| 7. | "Ochrasy" |
| 8. | "The New Boy" |
| 9. | "Long Before Rock 'n' Roll" |
| 10. | "Chi Ga" |
| 11. | "Clean Town" |

=== The Videos ===
| No. | Title | Length |
|---|---|---|
| 1. | "Mr. Moon" (Directed by Christoffer Sahlgren, 2000) |
| 2. | "The Band" (Directed by Håkan Schuler, 2001) |
| 3. | "Sheepdog" (Directed by Pontus Andersson, 2002) |
| 4. | "Paralyzed" (Directed by Håkan Schuler, 2003) |
| 5. | "Clean Town" (Directed by Amir Chamdin, 2004) |
| 6. | "God Knows" (Directed by Johan Torell & John Nordqvist, 2004) |
| 7. | "Down in the Past" (Directed by Christofer Diös, 2005) |
| 8. | "You Can't Steal My Love" (Directed by Mauricio Molinari, 2005) |
| 9. | "Long Before Rock 'n' Roll" (Directed by Daniel Eskils, 2006) |
| 10. | "TV & Me" (Directed by Kalle Haglund, 2006) |
| 11. | "Good Morning, Herr Horst" (Directed by Lovisa Inserra, 2006) |
| 12. | "Wildfire" (Directed by Gilly Barnes, 2007) |
| 13. | "Ochrasy" (Directed by Lovisa Inserra, 2007) |
| 14. | "If I Don't Live Today, Then I Might Be Here Tomorrow" (Directed by Andreas Nilsson, 2007) |
| 15. | "Never Seen the Light of Day" (Directed by Marcus Engstrand, 2008) |
| 16. | "Train on Fire (Director's Cut)" (Directed by Björn Fävremark & Torbjörn Martin, 2008) |
| 17. | "Dance with Somebody" (Directed by Matt Wignall & Vern Moen, 2008) |
| 18. | "Paralyzed (Alternate Version)" (Directed by Bolsen, Björn Fävremark & Torbjörn Martin, 2007) |

== Charts ==
| Chart (2012) | Peak position |
|---|---|
| Austria (Ö3 Austria Top 40) | 60 |
| Germany (Media Control AG) | 35 |
| Sweden (Media Control AG) | 37 |
| Switzerland (Schweizer Hitparade) | 40 |
