= Gustaf Norén =

Swedish singer and actor (born 1981)

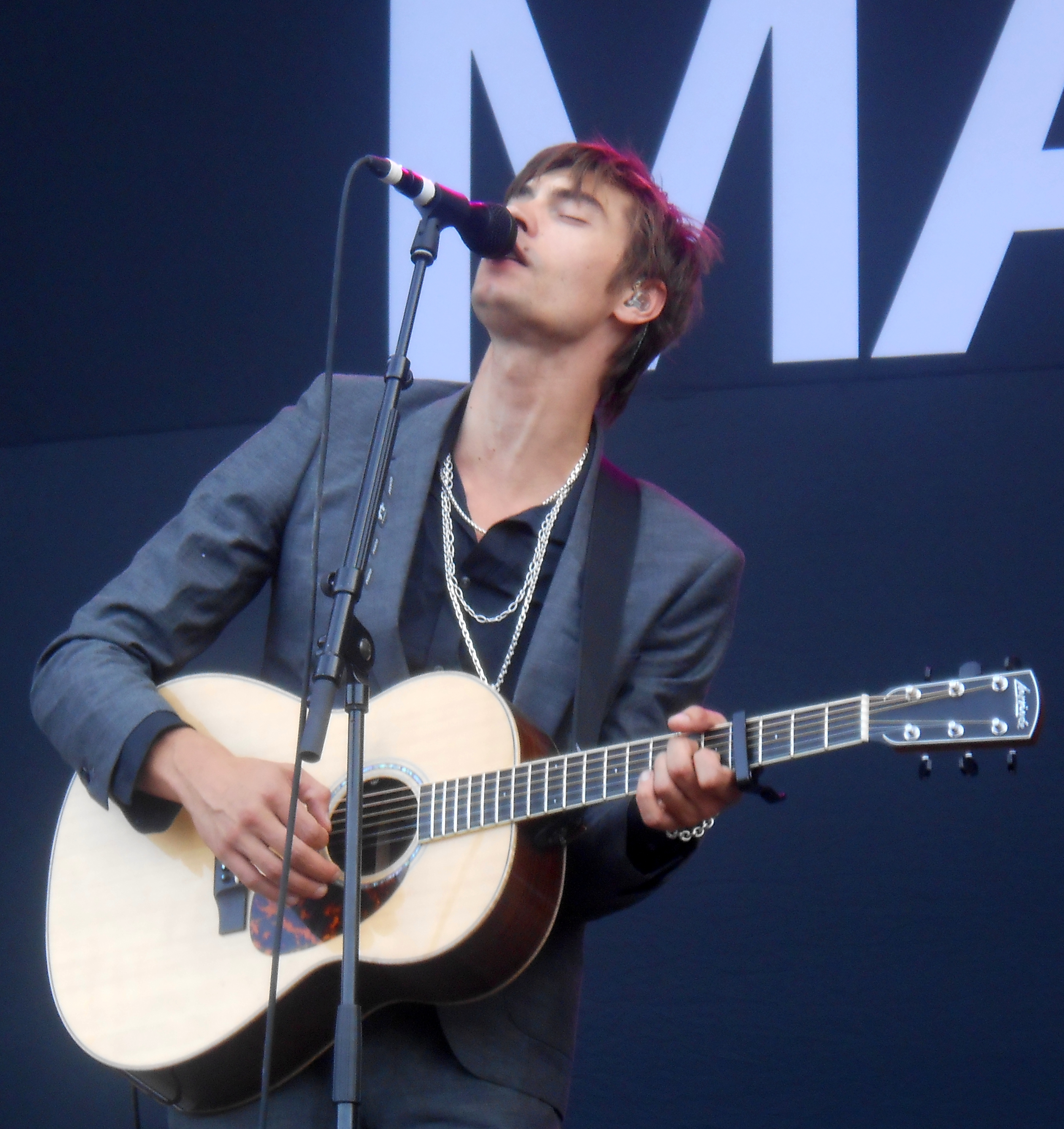
- Norén in 2012

Background information
- Born: Gustaf Erik David Norén; 1 February 1981 (age 44); Borlänge, Sweden
- Genres: Indie, Alternative, Rock, Pop
- Occupations: Singer; Songwriter; Actor
- Years active: 1996–present

Gustaf Erik David Norén (born 1 February 1981) is a Swedish musician (songwriting, vocals, guitar) and actor. He was previously one of the two frontmen of the Swedish band Mando Diao and is one half of the duo Gustaf & Viktor Norén.

== Beginnings ==
Gustaf was born to Jan Norén and Kerstin Bengtsson-Norén on 1 February 1981, in Borlänge. He has two younger brothers, Viktor and Carl, and a younger sister Josefine. Gustaf describes the rural surroundings of his childhood as carefree and creative. His talent for music showed very soon at school, as well as his liking for playing roles. According to his mother, he was a born actor.

During Gustaf's childhood and teenage years football played a big role. As other members of Mando Diao, he was a fan of local football club IK Brage which had strong roots in the working class.

After football, rock music was the second most important topic at school. Gustaf had a soft spot for the music of the 1960s, especially The Beatles. New bands like Nirvana were added to his favourites and since 1995 Britpop bands like Oasis and Blur.

== Musical career ==
=== Mando Diao ===
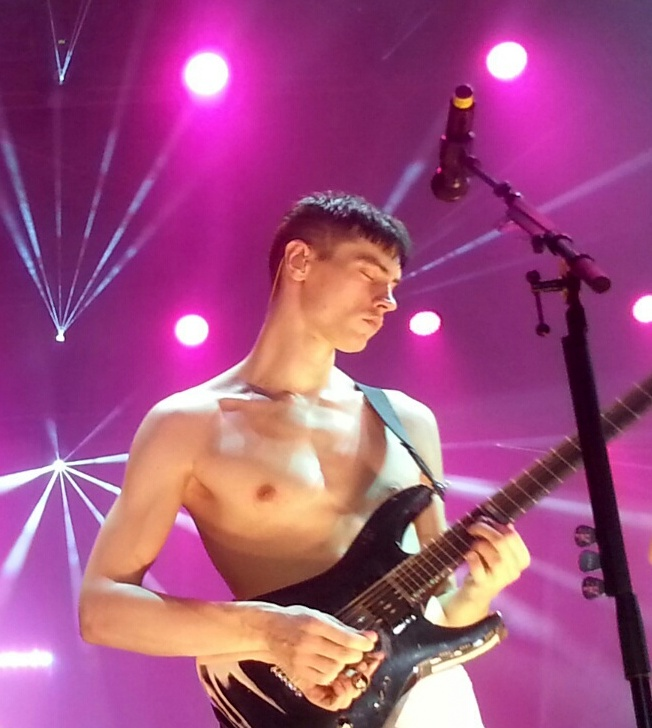
Gustaf Norén performing in Mando Diao (2014)

Gustaf Norén, was one of the two frontmen (vocals, guitar) of the Swedish rock band Mando Diao. In 1996, Gustaf met Björn Dixgård at a party. A short time later Björn invited Gustaf to join his band; they became the two frontmen of Butler, the band Björn Dixgård had founded together with Daniel Haglund, the future keyboarder of Mando Diao. Gustaf's father Jan for some time was part of the band too. In 1997, the name Butler was changed to Mando Jao. Allegedly Björn had a dream where a man appeared and shouted at him, telling him to name his band Mando Jao. Björn obeyed. Gustaf left the band in 1998 after he moved to Falun and had become alienated from his friends; however, after a short time he returned.

In 1999, the name was changed to Mando Diao as the band was sure it would offer a better English pronunciation. Band members at this time were Björn Dixgård, Gustaf Norén, Daniel Haglund, and Carl-Johan Fogelklou. During the same year Samuel Giers joined the band as the drummer. Daniel Haglund left the band in 2004 and was replaced by Mats Björke.

Touring bars and small locations all over Sweden were soon followed by performances in Central Europe; the US and Japan. Each of Mando Diao's album releases became more successful; today they are one of Sweden's most well known bands.

In 2008, Gustaf Norén and Björn Dixgård joined the artist collective Caligola; in 2012, the album Back To Earth was the first release of the music project.

Mando Diao's biggest success in their home country Sweden was achieved with the sixth studio album Infruset where ten poems of the Swedish poet Gustaf Fröding were set to music in 2012.

On 3 June 2015, Gustaf Norén separated from Mando Diao. On the same day, a press release from Sony Music announced the separation due to band members having "different visions".

=== Other music projects ===
Gustaf has made some of his music available for free on SoundCloud, such as the song Ma Queen Of Everything which was released on 19 September 2015. Ma Queen Of Everything is an early version of Higher Love, a song which Gustaf debuted just a few months later as part of State of Sound.

Gustaf Norén was featured on the Swedish singer Eric Saade's song Wide Awake. The Russian DJ duo Filatov & Karas released a remix of Wide Awake which charted in Russia, Ukraine and in France.

==== State of Sound ====
State of Sound
- Origin: Stockholm, Sweden
- Genres: Electronic pop/rock
- Years active: 2016-2019
- Labels: Sony Records
- Members: Gustaf Norén; Viktor Norén; Joakim Andrén

In January 2016 Gustaf Norén, his brother Viktor Norén and their friend Joakim Andrén introduced their new project State of Sound. Their debut single Higher Love was gold certified in Sweden. Their subsequent single Uti vår hage was also gold certified.

==== Gustaf & Viktor Norén ====
Gustaf & Viktor Norén
- Origin: Sweden
- Genres: Electronic pop/rock
- Years active: 2016-present
- Members: Gustaf Norén; Viktor Norén

In 2019 Gustaf and Viktor Norén went on tour in Sweden and also started working on their first joint full album. Hymns to the Rising Sun was recorded in the renowned RMV Studios on the island Skeppsholmen in Stockholm and released in October 2020, preceding the singles Rise Again and Walk With You.

In 2021 Gustaf and Viktor Norén were featured in Helt lyriskt, a Swedish music and culture television show on Sveriges Television (SVT) in which famous artists interpret famous poets. They interpreted Gustaf Fröding by setting his poem En fattig munk från Skara to music.

In the same year the duo joined the line-up of Så mycket bättre, a Swedish music television show on TV4 (Sweden) in which artists of various genres gather to interpret each other's songs.

In December 2021 they released the compilation album Samlade Sånger which among others features the previously released singles I Feel Like Christmas and Amerika, as well as their interpretations from Helt lyriskt and Så mycket bättre.

In June 2022 TV4 (Sweden) announced that Gustaf & Viktor Norén are set to film their own music television program which will be broadcast in 2023.

== Acting career ==
=== Ingen kom ner ===
In 2009, Gustaf had his first appearance as an actor in the short film Ingen kom ner, a Swedish production directed by Torbjörn Martin. It tells a horror story and had its premiere at the Gothenburg Film Festival on 23 January 2009. On 18 April 2009 it was shown at the Arizona International Film Festival under the name No Come Down.

=== She's Wild Again Tonight ===
On 12 November 2015, the Swedish movie She's Wild Again Tonight with Gustaf Norén and the Swedish actress Shima Niavarani as the main characters has had its premiere at the Stockholm Film Festival. Directed by Fia-Stina Sandlund, She's Wild Again Tonight is the third part of Sandlund's film trilogy; the preceding two parts are She's Blonde Like Me (2011) and She's Staging It (2012). The screenplay by Fia-Stina Sandlund and Josefine Adolfsson is a contemporary take on August Strindberg's play Miss Julie (Fröken Julie) from 1888. The plot is set in Brooklyn and Gustaf Norén and Shima Niavarani play their own fictionalized personalities. What begins as a professional meeting between two politically conscious young artists develops into a game of power where their inner selves are exposed. With feminism and anti-racism as weapons, She's Wild Again Tonight examines the modern gender roles in the young urban conscious sphere and blurs the boundaries between reality, drama, and fiction.

=== Others ===
In April 2021 it was first revealed that Gustaf Norén is set to act in a new movie alongside actress Liv Ullmann.

== Personal life ==
In 2004 Gustaf Norén was named 'Sweden's best dressed man' by the Swedish magazine Café.

In 2006 Gustaf was named 'Sweden's sexiest man', he was on top of the ranking which altogether featured 100 celebrities.

== Discography ==
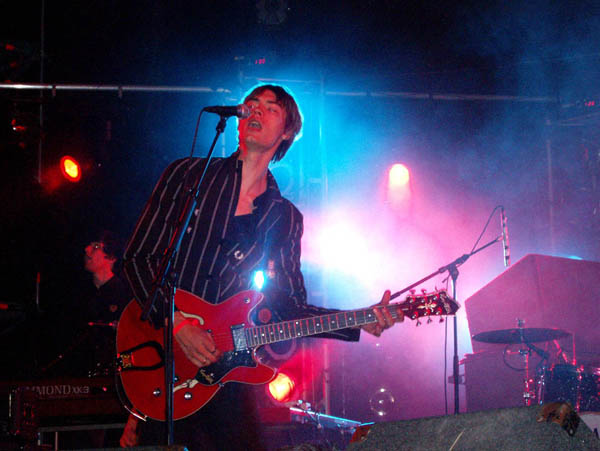
Norén at Storsjöyran festival in Östersund (2006)

=== Albums ===
==== Mando Diao ====
- 2002: Bring 'Em In
- 2004: Hurricane Bar
- 2006: Ode to Ochrasy
- 2007: Never Seen the Light of Day
- 2009: Give Me Fire!
- 2010: Above and Beyond - MTV Unplugged
- 2012: Infruset
- 2014: Ælita

==== Caligola ====
- 2012: Back to Earth
- 2012: Resurrection

==== State of Sound ====
- 2016: Higher Love
- 2018: Evighetens sommar

==== Solo ====
Title	Year	Peak chart positions
Title	Year	SWE
Dala floda	2024	53

==== Gustaf & Viktor Norén ====
Title	Year	Peak chart positions
Title	Year	SWE
Hymns to the Rising Sun	2020	55
Så mycket bättre 2021 – Tolkningarna	2021	—
Samlade sånger	2021	18

=== Singles ===
==== Gustaf & Viktor Norén ====
Title	Year	Peak chart positions	Album
Title	Year	SWE	Album
"Rise Again"	2020	–	Non-album single
"Walk with You"	2020	–	Non-album single
"I Feel like Christmas"	2020	– (Note: "I Feel like Christmas" did not enter the Swedish Singles Chart, but peaked at number 16 on the Swedish Heatseeker chart.)	Samlade sånger
"Amerika"	2021	–	Samlade sånger
"Guldet blev till sand"	2021	– (Note: "Guldet blev till sand" did not enter the Swedish Singles Chart, but peaked at number one on the Swedish Heatseeker chart.)	Samlade sånger and Så mycket bättre
"Sånger från dig (Tunna skivor)"	2021	77	Samlade sånger and Så mycket bättre
"Aldrig igen" (with K27)	2021	88	Samlade sånger and Så mycket bättre
"Musiken är mitt liv (Bo Diddley)"	2021	– (Note: "Musiken är mitt liv (Bo Diddley)" did not enter the Swedish Singles Chart, but peaked at number 10 on the Swedish Heatseeker chart.)	Samlade sånger and Så mycket bättre

==== State of Sound ====
Title	Year	Peak chart positions			Certifications	Album
Title	Year	SWE	BEL	NED	Certifications	Album
"Higher Love" (State of Sound feat. Viktor Norén & Gustaf Norén)	2016	98	–	–	SWE: Gold	Higher Love
"Uti vår hage"	2016	–	–	–	SWE: Gold	Higher Love
"Wake Up Where You Are" (State of Sound)	2016	58	Tip	96		Higher Love
"Love Me Like That" (State of Sound)	2017	97	–	–		
"Sommarvind" (State of Sound feat. Gustaf Norén)	2018	–	–	–		Evighetens sommar
"Somebody Like Me" (State of Sound feat. ORKID)	2019	–	–	–		

==== As featured artist ====
Title	Year	Peak chart positions				Certifications	Album
Title	Year	SWE	FRA	RUS	UKR	Certifications	Album
"Wide Awake" (Eric Saade featuring Gustaf Norén)	2016	–	–	–	–		Eric Saade album Saade
"Wide Awake" (remix) (Eric Saade featuring Gustaf Norén & Filatov & Karas)	2016	–	166	9	24		

== Filmography ==
- Ingen kom ner (2009)
- She's Wild Again Tonight (2015)
