= Carl-Johan Fogelklou =

Swedish musician (born 1980)

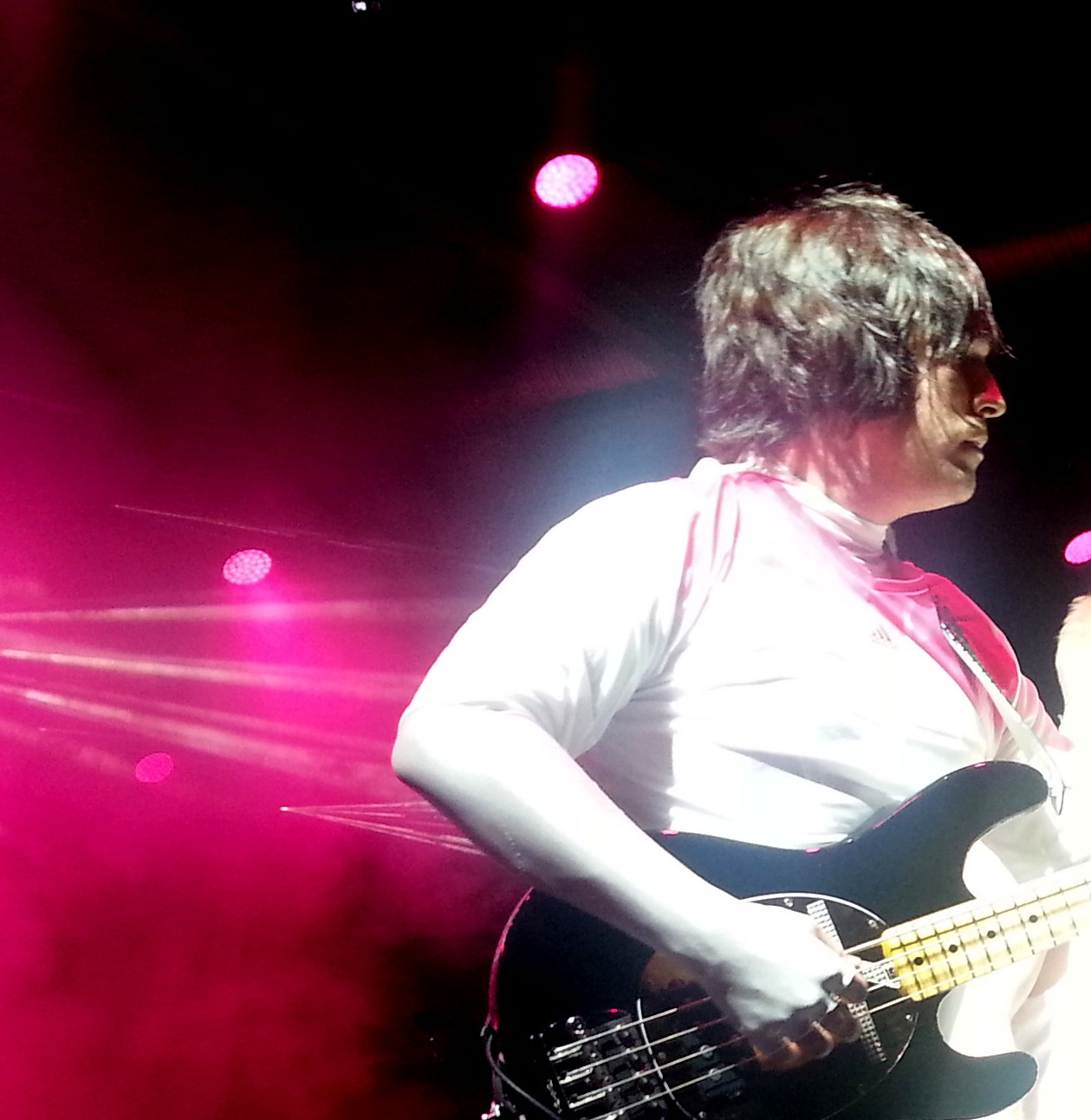
Fogelklou in 2014

Carl-Johan Peter Crispin Fogelklou (born 15 August 1980) is a Swedish musician (bass, vocals). He is bass player of the Swedish band Mando Diao.

== Biography ==
Carl-Johan Peter Crispin Fogelklou, bass player of Swedish rock band Mando Diao was born on 15 August 1980 in Uppsala, Sweden to Peter and Gunnel Fogelklou and is known to his fans as CJ. He has a sister called Lotta. When CJ was two, his family moved to Sigtuna near Stockholm.

He was interested in playing the guitar from early years; his source of inspiration was the rock band Guns N' Roses. After he received his first instrument as a birthday present, he played in various bands and at school performances. A teacher in the local school, who gave him guitar lessons, encouraged him. After high school CJ studied music in Falun and there at a party he met Mando Diao drummer Samuel Giers who at once wanted him to become part of the band. CJ agreed and became a full-time musician instead of visiting one of the best music schools in Sweden where he had been accepted. CJ, an ardent vegetarian, who likes to cook and loves good wine, got on well with his new friends immediately. According to Gustaf Norén, he was accepted because he looked like John Lennon and played the guitar like Paul McCartney.

In 2000, Mando Diao had the composition under which it became known: Gustaf Norén and Björn Dixgård playing the guitars and singing, Daniel Haglund on the keyboard, Carl-Johan Fogelklou on the bass, Samuel Giers on the drums. Daniel Haglund left the band in 2004 and was replaced by Mats Björke.

Touring bars and small locations all over Sweden was soon followed by performances in Central Europe; the USA and Japan. Each of Mando Diao´s album releases became more successful; today they are one of Sweden´s best known bands.

Mando Diao´s biggest success in their home country Sweden was achieved with the sixth studio album Infruset, were ten poems of the Swedish poet Gustaf Fröding were set to music in 2012.

Carl-Johan Fogelklou first appearance as songwriter was made on Mando Diao´s album Good Times (2017), the first album released after the break-up with Gustaf Norén.

In April 2018, he released the album The Story Of Life on Spotify, having founded a duo with Hanna Dahlberg Leuhusen: Hanna&CJ.

== Discography ==
=== Mando Diao ===
- 2002: Bring 'Em In
- 2004: Hurricane Bar
- 2006: Ode to Ochrasy
- 2007: Never Seen the Light of Day
- 2009: Give Me Fire!
- 2012: Infruset
- 2014: Aelita
- 2009: Good Times
