= Björn Dixgård =

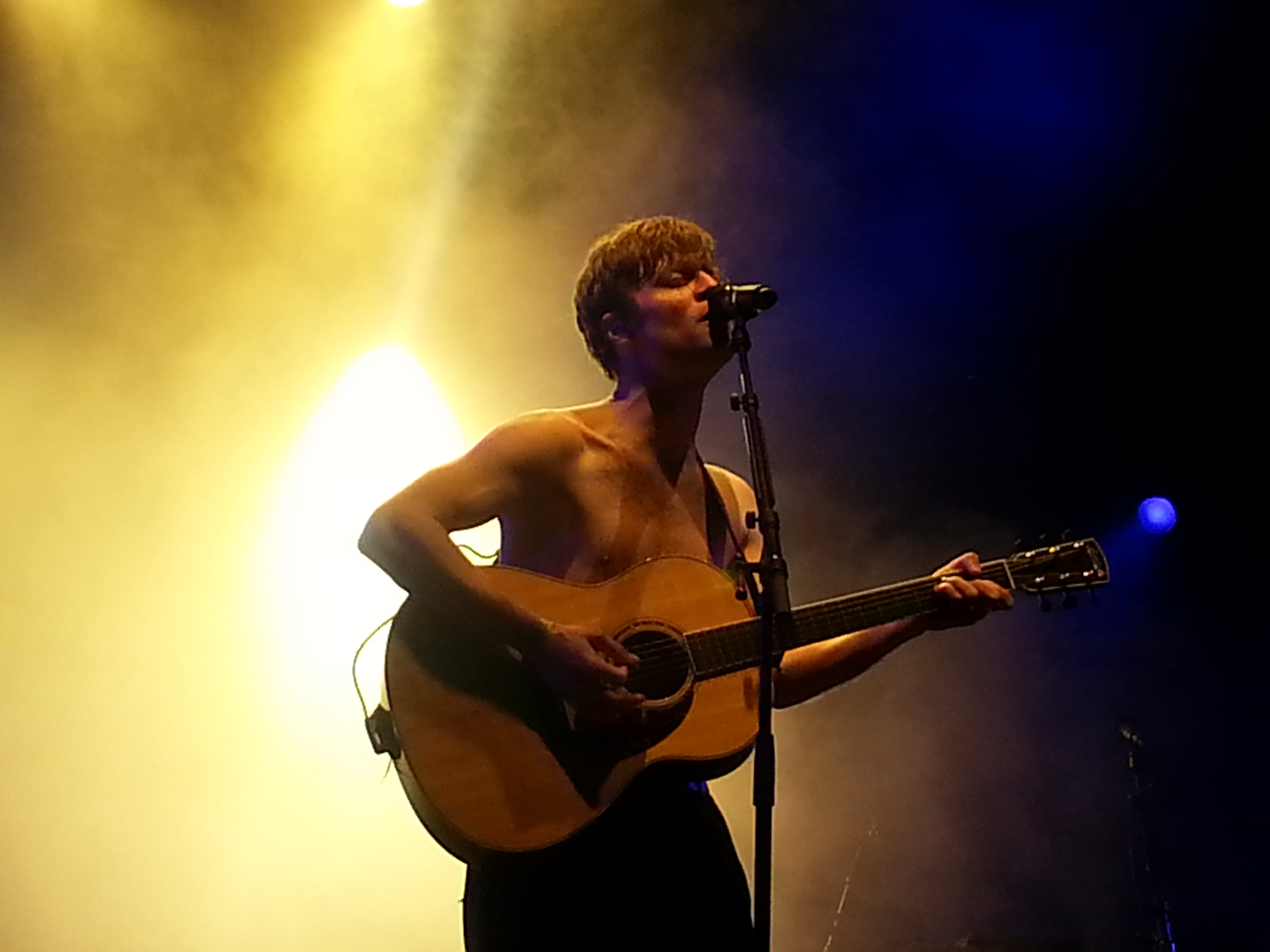
- Dixgård performing live in 2015

Background information
- Born: 8 May 1981 (age 45); Falun, Sweden
- Instruments: Vocals, guitar
- Member of: Mando Diao

Björn Hans-Erik Dixgård (born 8 May 1981) is a Swedish musician (vocals, guitar). He is the frontman of the Swedish band Mando Diao.

== Biography ==
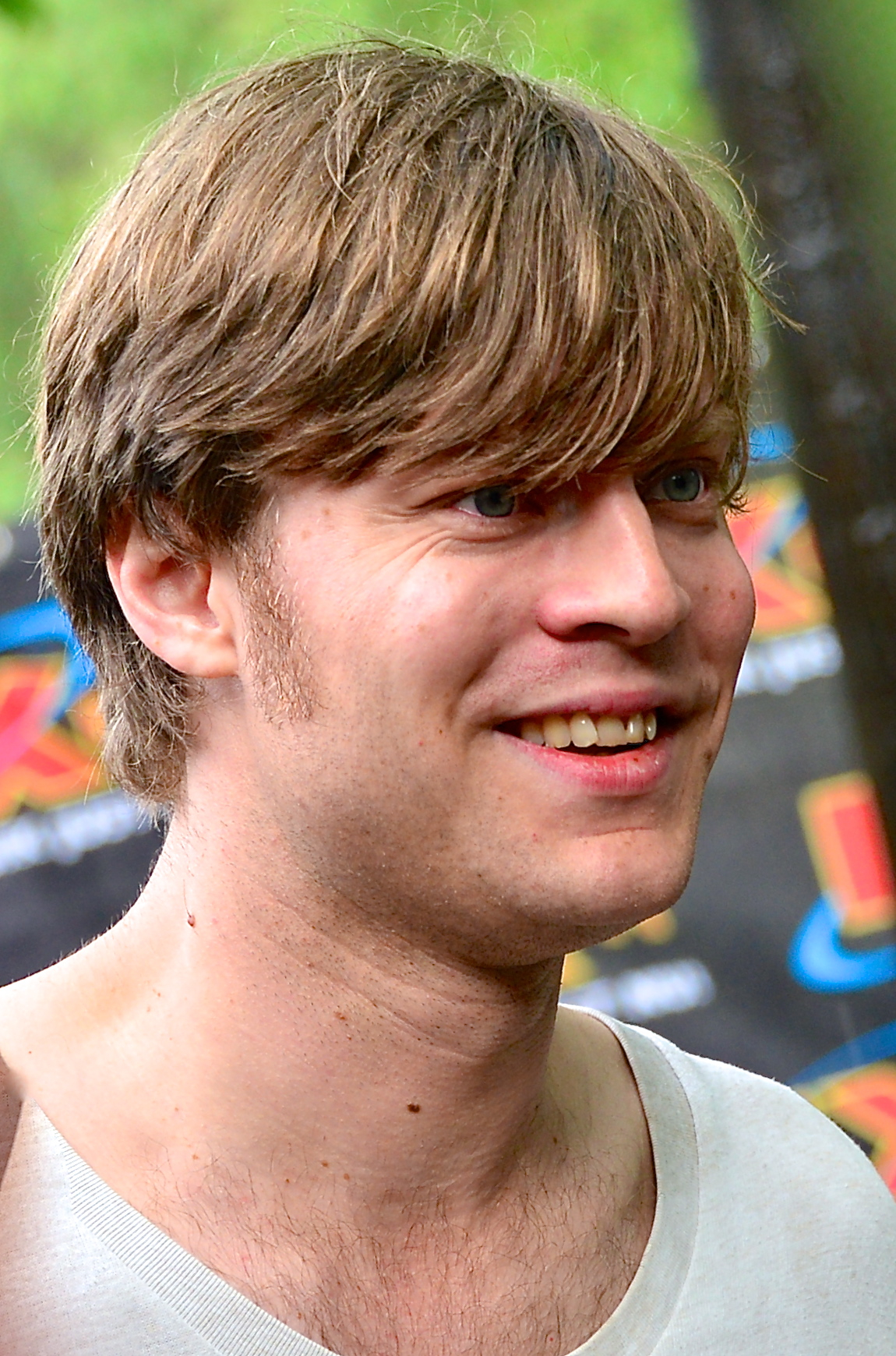
Dixgård in 2013

Björn Hans-Erik Dixgård was born on 8 May 1981, near Falun, Sweden, as the second child of Hans and Malin Dixgard. Some years later, the family moved to Romme, a town in the south of Borlänge. Björn attended elementary school and secondary school in Romme. One of his favorite activities as a young boy was fishing.
Music was always omnipresent in the Dixgård house. With Malin Dixgård being a gifted singer, and Hans Dixgård playing guitar in a band, their talents and taste in music were passed on to their children.
The first bands that had an influence on Björn were The Beatles, The Rolling Stones, The Kinks and The Who. Later at school, where the two main topics were football and rock music, new bands like Nirvana were added, and since 1995 Britpop bands like Oasis and Blur. His relationship with his parents was never overshadowed by teenage rebellion; Hans and Malin as former hippies and occupied in social work had the skill to block conflicts.

Björn became a member of a band for the first time at the age of fourteen when he started playing guitar in a band called “Butler”, which he founded together with Daniel Haglund, who was to be the first keyboarder of Mando Diao. Björn and Daniel knew each other from school.

In 1996, Björn and Gustaf Norén met at a party. A short time later Björn invited Gustaf to join his band; they became the two frontmen of Butler. In 1997, the name Butler was changed to Mando Jao. Allegedly Björn had a dream where a man appeared and shouted at him, telling him to name his band Mando Jao. Björn obeyed. Gustaf left the band in 1998, after moving to Falun and becoming alienated from his friends. He soon came back.

In 1999, the name was changed to Mando Diao, as the band was sure it would offer a better English pronunciation. Band members at this time were Björn Dixgård, Gustaf Norén, Daniel Haglund, and Carl-Johan Fogelklou. During the same year Samuel Giers joined the band as drummer. Daniel Haglund left the band in 2004 and was replaced by Mats Björke.

Touring bars and small locations all over Sweden were soon followed by performances in Central Europe; the USA and Japan. Each of Mando Diao's album releases became more successful; today they are one of Sweden's best known bands.
In 2007, Björn Dixgård did a solo tour in Europe.

In 2008, Björn Dixgård and Gustaf Norén joined the artist network Caligola; in 2012, the album Back To Earth was the first release of the music project.

Mando Diao's biggest success in their home country Sweden was achieved with the sixth studio album Infruset where ten poems of the Swedish poet Gustaf Fröding were set to music in 2012.

Björn married the Swedish actress and producer Emma Kihlberg in January 2008, at Södra Teatern in Stockholm. They have two children.

Björn's older sister Linnéa Dixgård is the singer of the band Twinflower Band.

== Discography ==
=== Mando Diao ===
- 2002: Bring 'Em In
- 2004: Hurricane Bar
- 2006: Ode to Ochrasy
- 2007: Never Seen the Light of Day
- 2009: Give Me Fire!
- 2012: Infruset
- 2014: Aelita
- 2017: Good Times
- 2020: Bang

=== Caligola ===
- 2012 Back To Earth
- 2012 Back To Earth - Resurrection
