= Uti vår hage (song) =

Traditional Swedish folk song

"Uti vår hage" (choir singing four verses).

"Uti vår hage" ("Out in our meadow" or "In our meadow") is a traditional Swedish folk song first published in Gotland sometime during the 1880s by Hugo Lutteman, though it is also considered to have earlier origins as far back as the 1600s.

The piece became widely published in the 1890s and is associated with a boom in interest in folk traditions in Sweden during this decade. The piece continues to be well known by the Swedish populace, performed frequently by choral groups, and has been described as a "national song treasure" typically taught to schoolchildren. Also owing to this popularity is an arrangement of the piece by composer Hugo Alfvén in 1923. There is also social debate around a theory this song contains a secret recipe to end an unwanted pregnancy.

The piece is often performed, among other Swedish traditional songs, during Walpurgis Night.

== Recordings ==
An early recording was made in the acoustic version of Oscar Ralf in 1916, and appeared on the album of the same year. The song has also been recorded in English by Engel Lund, with Ferdinand Rauter on the piano under a different translation, "Out in the Garden" in London January 26, 1954, which was released on record in June the same year. The Swedish music band State of Sound covered the song in 2016.

== In film ==
The piece appears in the following films:

- Du gamla du fria (1938)
- Hem från Babylon (1941)
- Som du vill ha mej (1943)
- Kärlek och allsång (1944)
- Janne Vängman i farten (1954)
- Sista dansen (1993)
- Hästmannen (2006)
- Linas kvällsbok (2007)
- Young Royals (2024)
- To the Sea (2024)
