= Rauter =

Rauter is a surname that is mostly found in Austria. Notable people with the surname include:

- Ben Rauter (born 1979), Australian rugby league footballer
- Bernadette Rauter (born 1949), Austrian former alpine skier
- Ernst Alexander Rauter (1929–2006), Austrian author and journalist
- Ferdinand Rauter (1895–1987), Austrian pianist exiled in England
- Hanns Albin Rauter (1895–1949), Austrian executed Nazi SS war criminal
- Herbert Rauter (born 1982), Austrian footballer
- Vic Rauter (born 1955), Canadian sportscaster

== See also ==
- Rautert, a German surname
