= Gloria (Mando Diao song) =

Single by Mando Diao

from the album Give Me Fire
- Released: 2009
- Recorded: 2008
- Genre: Alternative rock; garage rock
- Length: 3:59
- Label: EMI; Majesty
- Songwriter(s): Björn Dixgård; Gustaf Norén
- Producer(s): Salla Salazar

Mando Diao singles chronology
"Dance with Somebody" (2008)	"Gloria" (2009)	"The Quarry" (2009)

Music video
- "Gloria" on YouTube

"Gloria" is a song by the alternative rock band Mando Diao, and their second single from Give Me Fire. The single was released on 15 May 2009.

== Music video ==
The music video featured Gloria, a convicted escapee on the run from government officials, seeking refuge in a movie theater. The parallels between what are scenes from the feature presentation and what is actually occurring becomes diluted as the video progresses, culminating in what appears to be Gloria's apprehension by the government agents on a rooftop. However, this proves to be a false climax as the agents then enter the theater. One of them points at the projected image on the screen and the three agents approach it, believing it to be Gloria. Meanwhile, Gloria is actually sitting in the theater, a couple of rows in front of the band. She stands up and sneaks out of the theater undetected.

== Charts ==
=== Weekly charts ===
Chart (2009)	Peak position
Austria (Ö3 Austria Top 40)	32
Germany (GfK)	33
Netherlands (Single Top 100)	77
Sweden (Sverigetopplistan)	12
Switzerland (Schweizer Hitparade)	39

=== Year-end charts ===
Chart (2009)	Position
Sweden (Sverigetopplistan)	49
