= Sheep dog (disambiguation) =

A sheep dog is a dog or breed of dog traditionally used in the herding of sheep.

Sheep dog or Sheepdog may also refer to:

- The Sheepdogs, a Canadian rock band
- Sheepdog (song), a song from the album Bring 'Em In by Swedish band Mando Diao
- Sam Sheepdog, a character in a series of animated cartoons from Looney Tunes and Merrie Melodies
- Sheepdog Glory, a novel written by Roy Saunders
- Sheep Dog, a 1949 Disney animated short starring Pluto and Bent-Tail the Coyote
- Sheepdog, a discontinued distributed object storage system for QEMU providing volume and container services.
- North American English slang term for police
