= Mats Björke =

Swedish musician (born 1982)

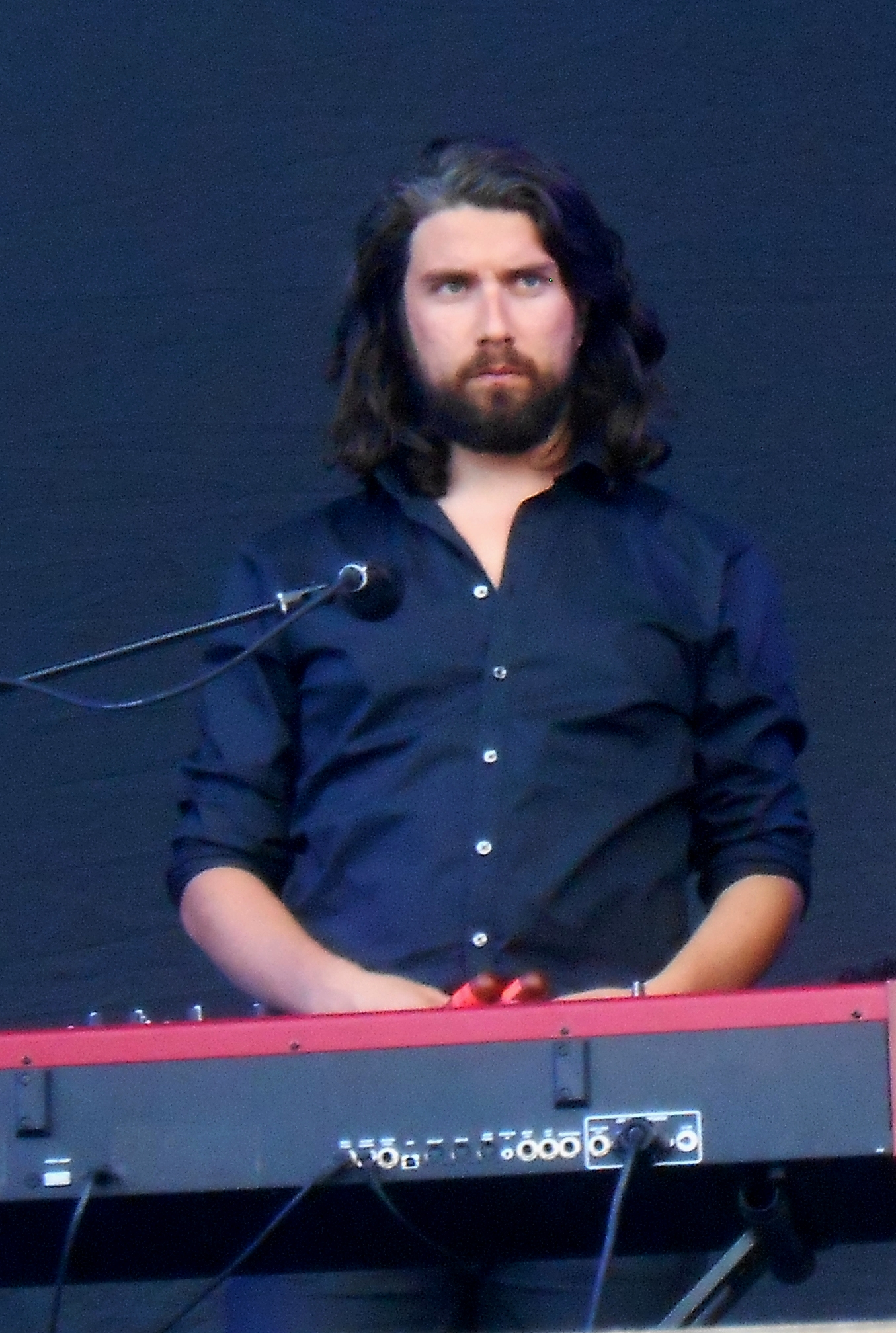
Mats Björke (Mando Diao)

Mats Anders Björke (born 10 June 1982) is a Swedish musician (keyboard) and producer. From 2004 to 2014, he was a member of the Swedish band Mando Diao.

== Biography ==
Mats Anders Björke was born on 10 June 1982, in Falun, Sweden.

In 2002 he moved to Stockholm due to music studies; at the same time he worked and played in bands. In spring 2003 Mats ended his music studies with no intention of continuing at another public institution. When he heard that Mando Diao were looking for a new keyboarder after the break-up with Daniel Haglund, he immediately applied for the job. Two months later he was accepted. According to Gustaf Norén it was silly that he did not think of him in the first place, as they had grown up together in the same street, and had even been schoolmates.

Officially he was not a band member in the beginning. The band even temporarily announced that being a four-piece (Gustaf Norén, Björn Dixgård, Carl-Johan Fogelklou, Samuel Giers) worked out much better. But touring together made them feel closer, and in 2004 Mats was officially accepted as a member of the band.

Touring bars and small locations all over Sweden was soon followed by performances in Central Europe; the United States and Japan. Each of Mando Diao's album releases became more successful; today they are one of Sweden's best known bands.

At the MTV Unplugged - Above and Beyond performance in September 2011 Mats was also to be seen playing the guitar.

Mando Diao's biggest success in their home country Sweden was achieved with the sixth studio album Infruset where ten poems of the Swedish poet Gustaf Fröding were set to music in 2012.

Björke is the producer of the Swedish Indie rockband Caviare Days. and is working together with the Swedish musician and actor Thorsten Flinck.

In November 2014, Björke left the band.

== Discography ==
=== Mando Diao ===
- 2002: Bring 'Em In (without Mats Björke)
- 2004: Hurricane Bar
- 2006: Ode to Ochrasy
- 2007: Never Seen the Light of Day
- 2009: Give Me Fire!
- 2012: Infruset

=== Caviare Days ===
- 2012: Caviare Days
