= Oh Doctor =

Oh Doctor or Oh Doctor! may refer to:

- Oh Doctor! (1917 film), an American short comedy
- Oh Doctor! (1925 film), an American comedy
- Oh, Doctor (1937 film), an American comedy starring Edward Everett Horton
- Oh Doctor, an alternate title of Hit the Ice (film), a 1943 Abbott and Costello comedy
- "Oh Doctor", a song by Mando Diao from the album Ghosts&Phantoms

== See also ==
- Oh No Doctor!, a 1934 British comedy
