= Above and Beyond – MTV Unplugged =

Above and Beyond - MTV Unplugged

Studio album by Mando Diao
- Released: 12 November 2010
- Genre: Garage rock
- Label: Musica de la Santa
- Producer: Mando Diao

Mando Diao chronology
The Malevolence of Mando Diao 2002-2007 (2009)	Above and Beyond - MTV Unplugged (2010)	Ghosts&Phantoms (2012)

Above and Beyond – MTV Unplugged by the Swedish rock band Mando Diao is the CD and DVD recording of their Unplugged show on 2 September 2010 in Berlin. The track list contains acoustic versions of a variety of songs reaching from their first to their last album, and including their most popular songs as well as new ones. Losing My Mind and No More Tears were performed in public for the first time during the show. Juliette Lewis, Ray Davies, Klaus Voormann and Lana Del Rey are performing as guests. Mando Diao's former keyboardist, Daniel Haglund, also appears as guest and additional musician.

As decoration, Mando Diao chose rooms of their past; four rooms were being created, designed by the band in cooperation with Anna Hellman and Paul Möllerstedt, two Swedish stage designers: the garage where the band members had been meeting in the beginning, a hotel room symbolizing the times spent travelling, a Swedish livingroom standing for their home, and a storeroom representing the band´s future, a place for storing memories lying in the future.

For the show, the band members were wearing traditional Swedish costumes. A special atmosphere was added by a group of four string players.

After playing in front of thousands of fans, this show with an audience of 300 guests was something new and incredible for the band, says bass player Carl-Johan Fogelklou.

On 12 November 2010 the recording of this MTV Unplugged performance was released as CD and DVD. Of the CD, there also exists a special two CD edition containing all 24 songs performed during the show.

After the recording, Samuel Giers left the band in the beginning of 2011.

== Track listing ==
=== Special edition ===
==== CD 1 ====
No.	Title	Length
1.	"Long Before Rock'n'Roll (live)"	4:22
2.	"Sheepdog (live)"	5:08
3.	"Losing My Mind (live)"	4:01
4.	"Chet Baker (live)" (with Lana Del Rey)	3:18
5.	"Gloria (live)" (with Lana Del Rey)	4:53
6.	"Song For Aberdeen (live)"	4:13
7.	"All My Senses (live)"	4:42
8.	"Dance With Somebody (live)"	4:57
9.	"High Heels (live)" (with Juliette Lewis)	4:59
10.	"Down In The Past (long version) (live)"	3:59
11.	"How We Walk (live)"	3:47
12.	"No More Tears (live)"	4:19

==== CD 2 ====
No.	Title	Length
13.	"You Can´t Steal My Love(live)"	3:58
14.	"Ochrasy (live)"	4:32
15.	"The New Boy (live)"	3:45
16.	"Ringing Bells (live)"	2:37
17.	"Mean Street (live)"	4:52
18.	"Your Lover´s Nerve (live)"	2:31
19.	"Mr. Moon (live)"	3:48
20.	"Hail Your Sunny Days (live)"	4:12
21.	"Victoria (live)" (with Ray Davies)	3:38
22.	"Bleecker Street (live)"	3:08
23.	"If I Don´t Live Today, Then I Might Be Here Tomorrow (live)"	3:30
24.	"God Knows (live)"	6:16
