= Fogelklou =

Fogelklou is a Swedish surname. Notable people with the surname include:

- Carl-Johan Fogelklou (born 1980), Swedish musician
- Emilia Fogelklou (1878–1972), Swedish theologian, historian, pacifist, and author
