= Roy Saunders (author) =

Welsh author

Roy Saunders was a Welsh author, illustrator, educator, radio broadcaster, and sheepdog enthusiast. His books include Sheepdog Glory (1956) and Craig of the Welsh Hills (1958).

His artwork as an etcher of the landscape and architecture of Wales was renowned.

He kept a small sheep farm and competed at sheepdog trials with his dog "Toss"; he was chairman of the South Wales Sheepdog Trials Association and a Director of the International Sheepdog Society.

He broadcast monthly radio talks on Welsh rural life for the Overseas Service of the BBC. He lectured on Natural History for Cardiff University Extra Mural Department.

While he was a teacher at Cathays High School he wrote and illustrated a book about the raising of the Swedish boat the Vassa.

He was also an art teacher at Cardiff High School and an art master at Cathays High School for Boys in Cardiff.
