= Nils Janson =

Swedish jazz trumpeter (born 1978)

- Born: 10 May 1978 (age 46)
- Origin: Sandviken, Sweden
- Genres: Jazz, rock
- Occupation(s): Musician, composer
- Instrument: Trumpet
- Labels: Found You Recordings

Nils Janson (10 May 1978) is a Swedish jazz trumpeter. His albums include Debut, Excavation, and Alloy. He is also active in pop, rock and Latin music, playing horns with Mando Diao, Calle Real, Hello Saferide, and Vincent Pontare.
