= Daniel Haglund =

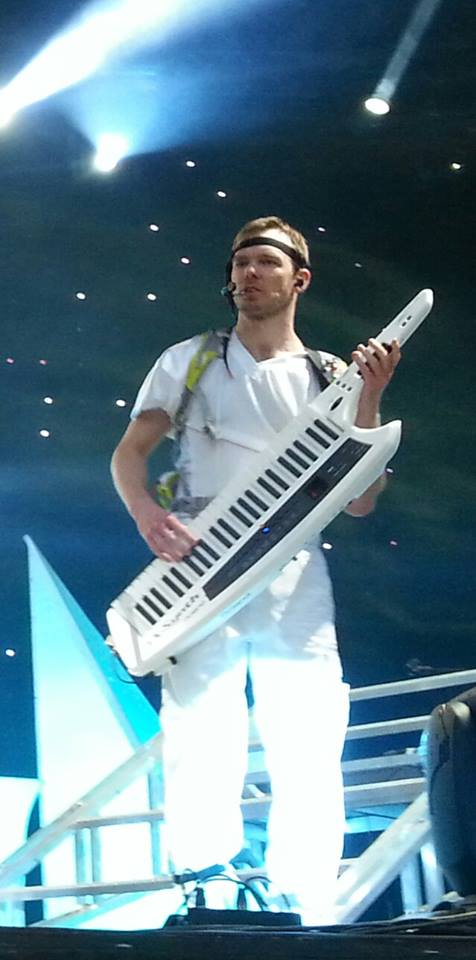
- Haglund in 2014

Background information
- Born: 25 March 1980 (age 45)
- Instrument(s): Piano, Keytar

Daniel Haglund (born 25 March 1980) is a Swedish musician and member of Mando Diao.

== Biography ==
Daniel Haglund was born in Falun, Sweden, on 25 March 1980. Already in his early childhood his talent for music showed; at the age of eleven he performed in a family show on Swedish TV playing keyboard and piano. For a few years Daniel went to the same school as Björn Dixgård; at the age of fifteen he founded a band called Butler together with Björn. In 1996, Gustaf Norén joined the band. In 1997 the name Butler was changed to Mando Jao. Allegedly Björn had a dream where a man appeared and shouted at him, telling him to name his band Mando Jao. Björn obeyed.

In 1999, the name was changed to Mando Diao for the band was sure it would offer a better English pronunciation. Band members at this time were Björn Dixgård, Gustaf Norén, Daniel Haglund, and Carl-Johan Fogelklou. During the same year Samuel Giers joined the band as drummer.

Daniel Haglund left the band in 2004 and was replaced by Mats Björke. He worked as teacher giving German and music lessons. In 2007 Daniel got in contact again with his former band, and in 2008 he performed some songs together with Mando Diao at Peace and Love Festival.

Since 2010 Daniel Haglund has been working together with Mando Diao at recordings and live acts (keyboard, guitar, keytar, synthesizer). He appeared at the MTV Unplugged show, and from 2011 to today he has joined the band on tours and at concerts.

Daniel Haglund has three children and lives in the small town Ed (Dalsland). Together with Sebastian Fahlander he is performing as the band "Två Lager Gladpack".
