= Calle Real =

Calle Real is Spanish for Royal Street, sometimes associated with El Camino Real (California).

Calle Real may refer to:

- Calle Real, Iloilo, name used to refer to a street and business district in Iloilo City, Philippines
- Calle Real (Pontevedra), a street in Pontevedra, Spain
- Calle Real (album), a 1983 album by Andalusian flamenco singer Camarón de la Isla
- Calle Real (band), a band from Sweden playing popish Timba
- Alabang–Zapote Road, formerly Calle Real, in southern Metro Manila, the Philippines
