= Rautert =

Rautert is a German surname. Notable people with the surname include:

- Miriam Rautert (born 1996), German model and beauty pageant titleholder
- Timm Rautert (born 1941), German photographer and professor of photography

== See also ==
- Rauter, a surname mostly found in Austria
