= Christmas Could Have Been Good =

Song by Mando Diao

Christmas Could Have Been Good is a song by Swedish rock band Mando Diao which was released digitally on December 2, 2011 along with a video . In January 2012, the song was added as the only previously unreleased song to the compilation album Greatest Hits Volume 1.
