= Dance with Somebody =

Single by Mando Diao

from the album Give Me Fire
- Released: 9 January 2009
- Recorded: 2008
- Genre: Alternative rock, garage rock
- Length: 4:01
- Label: EMI, Majesty
- Songwriters: Björn Dixgård, Gustaf Norén
- Producer: Salla Salazar

Mando Diao singles chronology
"Train On Fire" (2008)	"Dance with Somebody" (2009)	"Gloria" (2009)

"Dance with Somebody" is a song by the Swedish alternative rock band Mando Diao. It was released in January 2009 as the lead single from their album, Give Me Fire. A segment of the song was the theme song for the twelfth season of the American version of Dancing with the Stars.

It remains the band's most successful single to date, reaching number one in Austria and Slovakia and in the top 10 in several countries across Europe.

== Music video ==
The music video was directed by Matt Wignall and Vern Moen.

== Charts ==
=== Weekly charts ===
Chart (2009)	Peak position
Austria (Ö3 Austria Top 40)	1
Belgium (Ultratip Bubbling Under Flanders)	16
Czech Republic (Rádio – Top 100)	12
European Hot 100 Singles (Billboard)	12
Finland (Suomen virallinen lista)	13
Germany (GfK)	2
Netherlands (Dutch Top 40)	4
Netherlands (Single Top 100)	9
Slovakia (Rádio Top 100)	1
Sweden (Sverigetopplistan)	4
Switzerland (Schweizer Hitparade)	3

=== Year-end charts ===
Chart (2009)	Position
Austria (Ö3 Austria Top 40)	12
Germany (Official German Charts)	5
Netherlands (Dutch Top 40)	6
Netherlands (Single Top 100)	32
Sweden (Sverigetopplistan)	42
Switzerland (Schweizer Hitparade)	14

== Covers ==
In 2014, the song was covered by German heavy metal band Iron Savior as a surprise track on their album Rise of the Hero. Vocalist/guitarist Piet Sielck explained that the band originally intended the song to be a bonus track for their limited edition release. He addressed why it never came to be:

"we simply liked it too much and finally decided to make it a regular album track."
