= Craig of the Welsh Hills =

1958 novel by Roy Saunders

- First edition
- Author: Roy Saunders
- Publisher: Oldbourne Press
- Publication date: 1958

Craig of the Welsh Hills is a novel written by Roy Saunders in 1958. It was first published in London by Oldbourne Press. The novel follows the adventures of Craig, a champion Border Collie herding dog, who escapes into the Welsh hills following a car accident and becomes a sheep-killer and the efforts of his owner to recapture him.
