= Engel Lund =

Danish-Icelandic soprano (1900–1996)

Engel Lund (14 July 1900 – 15 June 1996) was a Danish-Icelandic soprano and a collector and distinguished interpreter of traditional music. Her most notable work is the Book of Folk Songs, a collection of 49 pieces with piano accompaniments by her stage partner, Austrian composer and pianist Ferdinand Rauter. It was first published in 1936 by Oxford University Press.

Lund was born to Danish parents on 14 July 1900 in Reykjavík, where she spent her early childhood. At the age of 11, her parents moved back to Denmark, where she attended grammar school. She studied singing in Copenhagen, Paris, and finally in Germany. During that time, she developed a growing interest in folk songs and began working with Rauter.

With the outbreak of the Second World War, she moved to London, where she would live through most of her professional career, as did Rauter (who, having effectively become a citizen of the Reich after the German annexation of Austria, was briefly interned early in the war). Concerts led them all over Europe, the United States, and Canada.

Lund was renowned for her ability to present songs from many different countries in their original languages "completely without accent", and for speaking as many as 20 languages fluently.

Lively introductions and story-telling were an integral part of her live performance.

Her recitals would always include a few Icelandic and Yiddish songs, of which she was particularly fond. Consequently, she stopped performing in Germany during the Nazi regime after authorities had asked her to refrain from presenting Jewish material.

Having retired from the stage, she returned to Iceland, where she was awarded a professorship for life in singing at Reykjavík Conservatory, teaching regularly until she was almost 90 years old.

Engel Lund died on 15 June 1996.

== Recordings ==
- A recent rendition by various artists of the Book of Folk Songs is available.
- An original recording by Lund and Rauter, Íslenzk þjóðlög, is currently out of print, but can be obtained online in MP3 format.
- Musicraft 78 rpm. Album 39. 1128-A & 1128-B, Matrix numbers: GM496A & GM497A. French Folk Songs (arr. F. Rauter) & American Folk Songs (arr. Cecil Sharp) with Ferdinand Rauter, piano.
