= Ernst Alexander Rauter =

Austrian leftist author

Ernst Alexander Rauter (27 April 1929 in Klagenfurt – 8 March 2006 in Munich) was an Austrian uncommitted leftist author, journalist and self–taught language critic.

Sketch of Ε. Α. Rauter

== First Years ==
His mother died when he was still young, and as a result he had a difficult childhood. He spent many years in institutions and workplaces. It seems that the little time he “suffered” school wasn’t enough to ruin his love for learning. He also loved language studies, to which he since stuck, describing himself as a “sprachgast”, meaning “guest of language”. His perception that “words have their own life” dominated his life and work ever since. His thirst for learning urged him to travel around the world. From these trips he made money by writing his impressions in tourist guides. He settled in Majorca for several years, after having learned Spanish.

== «Creating subject people» ==
He was considered a "cult" author of the '68 generation. In the 1960s he actively participated in the west – German, extra – parliamentary opposition, Außerparlamentarischen Opposition – (ΑΡΟ) and took part in many public demonstrations besides its leader Rudi Dutschke. In 1968 he became popular to the rebellious youth of the time, thanks to his book “How an opinion forms in the mind. Creating subject people”. There, densely and comprehensively, he described the mechanism of enslavement and manipulation of the people by political and economical rulers. The most interesting point of his analysis is the statement that information being “planted” into our heads is responsible for forming our judg(e)ments and beliefs, which in turn determine our actions, and our life as a whole. “In school people are created. The process of creating people is called education. Since a man’s actions determine the course of his life, the information he receives, determines the way he’ll live. Schools not only create people, they also create biographies”.

== Later work ==
From his many books, the distinguished one, is the dynamic social critic book : “From the biface to the factory” (1977). He wrote articles for the leftist magazine Konkret, wrote theater plays for Berlin cabarets, and later organized seminars about writing and journalism on behalf of «Münchener Akademie der Bayerischen Presse» and «Salzburger Kuratorium für Journalistenausbildung».

During his last years he was married to a teacher, and father of several children (at least one daughter and one son) as a result of former relationships. He died on March 8, 2006, at the age of 76 in a Munich hospital, due to wounds from falling.

Fellow author Hermann Peter Piwitt described him as "one of the greats of the German language".

== Quote ==
"Many colleagues fool themselves into believing that one may need half a year to learn how to butcher a pig, or three years to learn to sow a suit, but that everybody can write if he is a little excited."

== Works ==
- «Wie eine Meinung in einem Kopf entsteht. Uber das Herstellen von Untertanen» (How an opinion forms in the mind. Creating subject people), Weismann Verlag 1971, ISBN 3-921040-04-3
- «Folter - Lexikon» (Torture-Lexicon), 1969
- «Du sollst mich mal kennenlernen... Das Haus der fertigen Sätze» (You shall get to know me ... The house of prefab sentences), rororo 1972, ISBN 3-499-20014-7
- «Vom Faustkeil zur Fabrik» (From the biface to the factory), Weismann Verlag 1977, ISBN 3-921040-13-2
- «Vom Umgang mit Wörtern» (How deal with words), Verlag Antje Kunstmann 1978, ISBN 3-921040-53-1
- «Brief an meine Erzieher» (Letter to my educators), 1979, Weismann Verlag 1980 (2. Aufl.), ISBN 3-921040-62-0
- «Kunerma, der Ort, wo niemand wohnt. Als westdeutscher Gastarbeiter in der sibirischen Taiga» (Kunerma, the place where nobody lives. As West German guest worker in the Siberian taiga), Baulino Verlag 1979, ISBN 3-203-50706-4
- «Die kunstvolle Arbeit der Verführung» (The art of seduction), Ullstein 1981, ISBN 3-550-06457-8
- «Magnet Sibirien» (Magnetic Siberia), 1983
- «Folter in Geschichte und Gegenwart von Nero bis Pinochet» (Torture in the past and present, from Nero to Pinochet), Eichborn Verlag (Neuauflage 1988), ISBN 3-8218-1245-1
- «Mallorca. Das Land hinter der Buhne» (Majorca. The land behind the breakwater), Rasch u. Röhring 1988, ISBN 3-89136-191-2
- «Wofür arbeiten wir eigentlich?» (Those who really work?), Rasch u. Röhring 1988, ISBN 3-89136-156-4
- «Die neue Schule des Schreibens» (The new school of scripture), Econ 1996, ISBN 3-430-17661-1
- «Leben buchstabieren» (The spelling of life), Gollenstein Verlag 2005, ISBN 3-935731-82-5
- Heinz Felsbach, Ernst Alexander Rauter (Hrsg.): Internationaler Publizistik-Preis Klagenfurt 1987. Texte, Thesen, Reaktionen. (Felsbach Heinz, Ernst Alexander Rauter (ed.):International Journalism Award Klagenfurt 1987th Texts, theories, reactions), Paul List Verlag 1988, ISBN 3-471-77542-0
