= Aelita (synthesizer) =

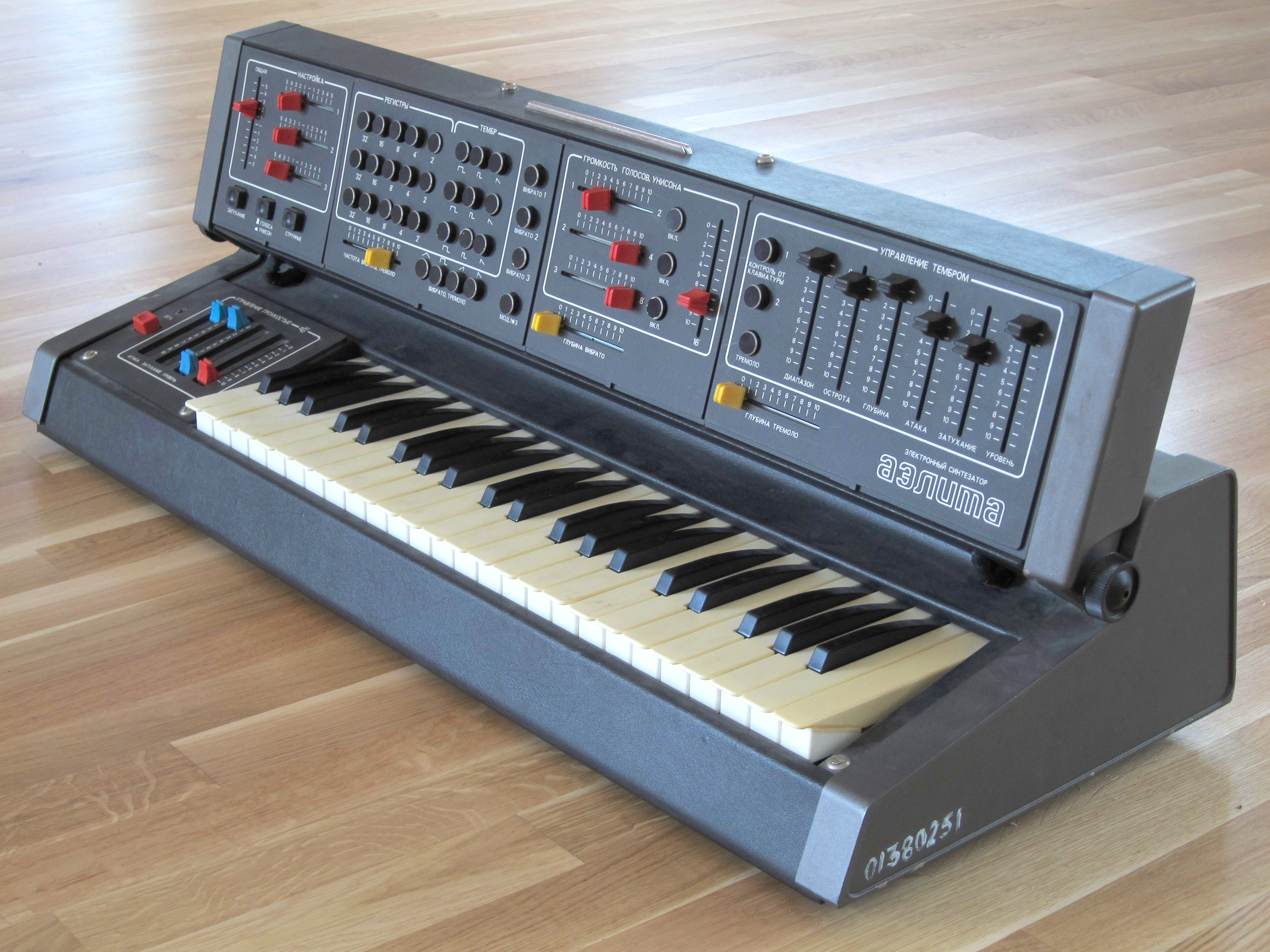
The Aelita synthesizer (this one from 1988)

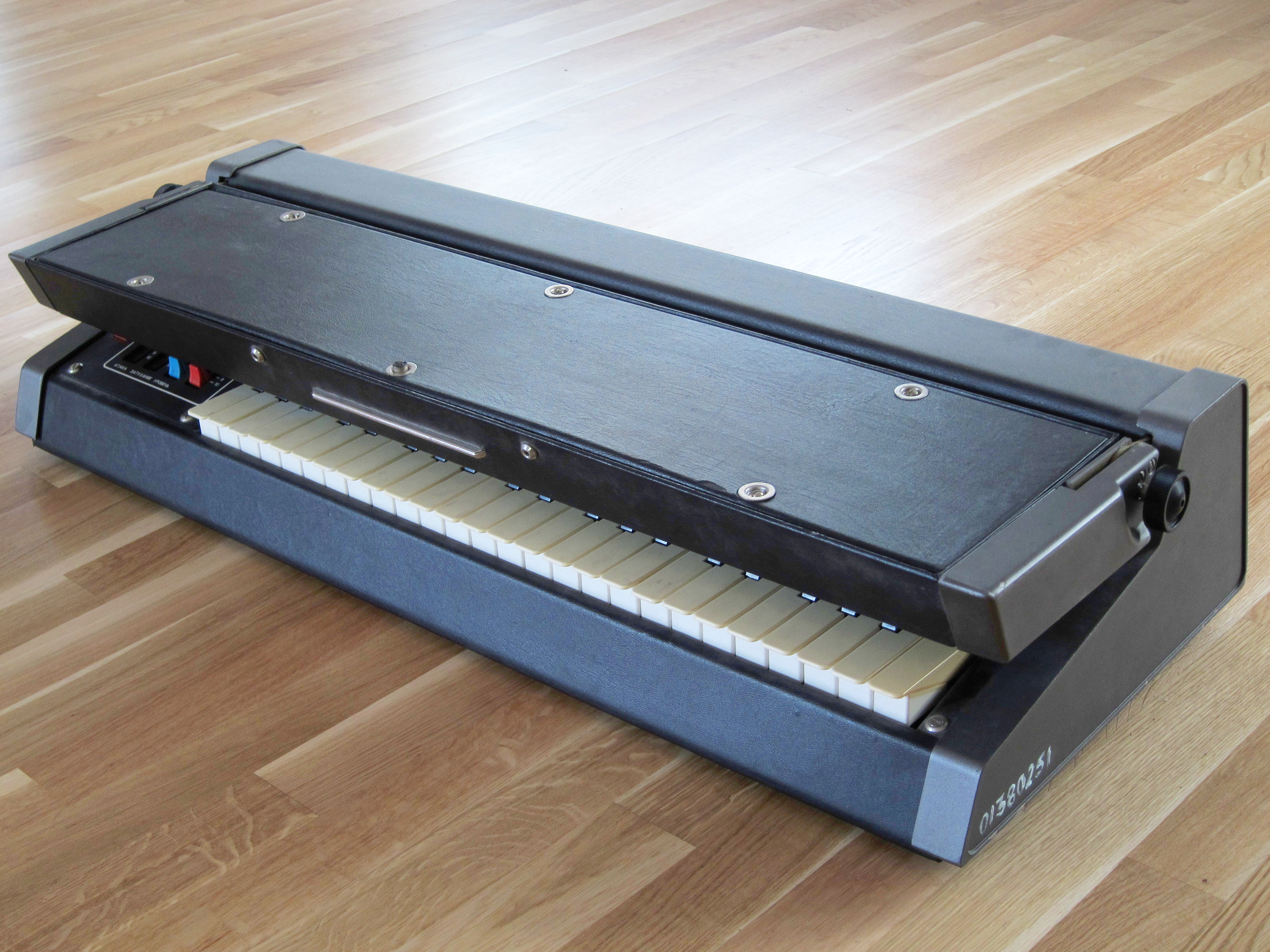
The Aelita synthesizer with its control panel down.

Aelita (synth.) sound example

Aelita (synth.) sound examples

Aelita (synth.) sound examples

Aelita (synth.) sound examples

Aelita (synth.) sound examples

The Aelita (Russian: Аэлита), sometimes referred to as the Murom Aelita (Russian: Муром Аэлита), is a monophonic analog synthesizer manufactured in the Soviet Union in the 1980s.

== History ==
Manufacturing started in 1980 at the Murom radio plant. The electronics was revised in 1986, but the features remained the same.

== Features ==
=== Physical features ===
Although its design seems inspired from American and Japanese synthesizers of the previous decade, with a dark aluminum body and near vertical control panel, the Aelita's looks are distinctive in the details.

They feature large colored plastic sliders instead of the more common rotary dials, and round or rounded push-buttons instead of flip or rotary switches. The vertical sliders are oriented so that their maximum labelled value is at the bottom, instead of the top as is more common. A sole red LED lights up when the instrument is on.

Its hinge-mounted upper control panel can be shut like a piano keyboard's lid, thus protecting the buttons and sliders and preventing accidental settings changes during transportation, and changing the general shape of the instrument to one that is not playable but more transportable.

The keyboard is 3.5 octaves wide and made of 44 unweighted, full-sized plastic keys ranging from F to C.

All controls are labelled in Russian, using Cyrillic script.

=== Functional features ===
The Aelita has 3 oscillators, each with 3 fixed waveshapes (Saw, Pulse and Square), plus a 4th oscillator only active in unison mode, amplitude cross-modulation, a low-pass filter with resonance, one LFO and two envelope generators, all arranged in a fixed architecture typical of subtractive synthesis. It has a maximum range of 7.5 octaves. It is monophonic, meaning that it can play only one note at a time (although detuning of each oscillator makes it possible to play fixed intervals or chords instead of notes).

It has two special modes: the unison mode creates an unison-like effect on each oscillator (reducing the range as a tradeoff), and the strings mode creates a vibrato-like effect independent of the LFO.

Although of a sturdier construction, it lacks several features commonly found on American and Japanese brand synthesizers at the time, such as: velocity response, portamento, pitch and modulation wheels or levers, settings memory, and (from late 1982 on) MIDI implementation.

Its output is monaural.

== Sonic character ==
Its sonic qualities have been consistently qualified as "fat". Other reviewers also call them "impressive", and sometimes "aggressive". There is audible background noise at the output, resembling oscillator bleed.
