= Sheepdog Glory =

1956 novel written by Roy Saunders

- First edition (publ. Andre Deutsch)
- Author: Roy Saunders
- Language: English
- Publisher: Andre Deutsch
- Publication date: 1956

Sheepdog Glory is a 1956 novel written by Roy Saunders. It is a biography of Toss, a Border Collie herding dog owned by Saunders. The novel chronicles Toss's development from a puppy to a winner of the annual sheepdog trials. It is set in the framework of a Welsh shepherd's calendar, and follows the mixed fortunes of the hill shepherd's daily life.

The novel was reprinted in 2009 by Outrun Press.
