= Ferdinand Rauter =

Austrian pianist and teacher, exiled in England (1902–1987)

Ferdinand Rauter (4 June 1902 – 6 December 1987) was an Austrian born pianist and teacher who spent his later life in England.

== Austria and Germany ==
Rauter was born in Klagenfurt. From 1920 he lived in Dresden, studying music at the Orchestra College of the Saxonian Orchestra, and chemistry at Dresden Technical College. His earliest musical engagements were at Theater Münster in North West Germany. He became choir repetiteur and pianist for Kurt Jooss and his ballet company.

In 1929 in Hambourg he first accompanied the Danish-Icelandic singer Engel Lund, the beginning of a 30 year partnership. Lund was a collector and interpreter of folk music from around the world, performing the songs in their original languages. Together they toured Germany, Europe and the United States with their multi-lingual programme, including German, Yiddish, and Icelandic songs. It was titled Folk Songs of Many Lands. They made several folk song recordings for the BBC and for EMI.

== Exile and wartime ==
When the Nazi party demanded that they remove the Yiddish songs from their programme, the duo relocated to Denmark, and in 1935 to England. Oxford University Press published two volumes of songs (1936 and 1949), in fourteen languages, with translations by Ursula Vaughan-Williams and Eileen MacLeod. Lund returned to Iceland in 1960 to teach at the Reykjavik Conservatoire, and died there in 1996.

During World War 2 Rauter was interned as an enemy alien on the Isle of Man in 1940. While there he met Norbert Brainin, Siegmund Nissel and Peter Schidlof, encouraging them to form what was to become the Amadeus Quartet. He was released in November that year after intervention from Vaughan Williams and others. With Lund he was a frequent performer at the wartime National Gallery lunchtime concert series organised by Myra Hess. To help fellow émigré musicians he co-founded the Refugee Musicians Committee, the Austrian Musicians Group and the Anglo-Austrian Music Society, which organised concerts that included the music of émigré composers in England. After the war he worked as music therapist in Camphill, near Aberdeen with Karl König, connected with his interest in Rudolph Steiner’s Anthroposophy movement.

== Personal life ==
He married Claire Kösten on 6 January 1946. Their daughter Andrea was born in December 1946, and a son, Peter in 1948. They lived at 74 Carlton Hill, St John's Wood in London, which became an open house for émigré musicians. Their circle included Hans Gál, Egon Wellesz and Max Rostal, as well as Myra Hess, Ralph Vaughan Williams and his wife Ursula, Imogen Holst and folk song collector Maud Karpeles.

Rauter was also an expert on mushrooms and an enthusiastic cook and photographer. Known as ‘Rau’ to his friends, he continued to perform and teach until shortly before his final illness. He died in London in 1987, aged 85 years. In 1996 his daughter Andrea was appointed as Music Project Manager at the Austrian Cultural Forum, London.

== Recordings ==
- Lund and Rauter. Folk Songs of Many Lands, Musicraft Album 39 (1940)
- Lund and Rauter. Íslensk Þjóðlög, Parlophone (1960)
- Lieder Theatre London. Engel Lund's Book of Folk Songs, Nimbus Records NI 5813/14 (2007)
