= Ode to Ochrasy =

Studio album by Mando Diao
- Released: 25 August 2006 (Germany); 25 August 2006 (Sweden); 2 April 2007 (UK); 10 April 2007 (U.S.)
- Genre: Garage rock
- Label: Mute Records
- Producer: Mando Diao

Mando Diao chronology
Hurricane Bar (2004)	Ode to Ochrasy (2006)	Never Seen the Light of Day (2007)

Ode to Ochrasy is the third studio album by Mando Diao. The first single to be from the album was "Long Before Rock 'n' Roll"; the second was "Good Morning, Herr Horst". "The Wildfire (If It Was True)" appears in the video game NHL 08.

== Track listing ==
All songs written by Dixgård/Norén.

1. "Welcome Home, Luc Robitaille" – 4:33
2. "Killer Kaczynski" – 2:31
3. "Long Before Rock 'n' Roll" – 2:49
4. "The Wildfire (If It Was True)" – 4:25
5. "You Don't Understand Me" – 4:09
6. "Tony Zoulias (Lustful Life)" – 3:22
7. "Amsterdam" – 3:23
8. "TV & Me" – 3:46
9. "Josephine" – 4:27
10. "The New Boy" – 3:22
11. "Morning Paper Dirt" – 2:30
12. "Good Morning, Herr Horst" – 1:57
13. "Song for Aberdeen" – 3:22
14. "Ochrasy" – 3:17
- Vinyl bonus tracks
1. "San Francisco Bay" (Previously Unreleased)
2. "Duel of the Dynamite" (previously unreleased)
3. "With or Without Love" (B-side)
4. "Moonshine Fever" (previously unreleased)
5. "Chi" (B-side)
- iTunes bonus track
1. "Moonshine Fever" (previously unreleased)
- US bonus tracks
1. "Long Before Rock 'n' Roll (Video)"
2. "Good Morning, Herr Horst (Video)"
3. "TV & Me (Video)"
- UK bonus tracks
1. "San Francisco Bay" (previously unreleased)
2. "With or Without Love" (B-side)
3. "Moonshine Fever" (previously unreleased)
4. "Chet Baker" (B-side)
- Japan bonus tracks
1. "This Is the Modern" (previously unreleased)
2. "Chet Baker" (B-Side)
- Limited edition bonus disc
1. "San Francisco Bay" (previously unreleased)
2. "Duel of the Dynamite" (previously unreleased)
3. "With or Without Love" (B-side)
4. "Moonshine Fever" (previously unreleased)
5. "Long Before Rock 'n' Roll (Video)"
6. "Welcome Home Luc Robitaille (Studio Footage)"

== Personnel ==
- Björn Dixgård – vocals, guitar
- Gustaf Norén – vocals, guitar
- Carl-Johan Fogelklou – bass
- Mats Björke – keyboards
- Samuel Giers – drums
- Andreas Forsman – violin (9, 10, 13)
- Erik Arvinder – violin (9, 10, 13)
- Erik Holm – violin (9, 10, 13)
- Anna Landberg Dager – cello (9, 10, 13)
- Goran Kajfes – trumpet (2, 4)
- Per Johansson – tenor saxophone (2, 4)
- Gabriel Munck – background vocals (8)

== Charts ==
=== Weekly charts ===
Chart (2006–2007)	Peak position
Austrian Albums (Ö3 Austria)	2
German Albums (Offizielle Top 100)	3
Swedish Albums (Sverigetopplistan)	7
Swiss Albums (Schweizer Hitparade)	5

=== Year-end charts ===
Chart (2006)	Position
Austrian Albums (Ö3 Austria)	72
German Albums (Offizielle Top 100)	85

== Singles ==
The first single from the album, "Long Before Rock 'n' Roll", is Mando Diao's eleventh single. The song was played on MTV Central and is known for its shoutpart. The song was performed at Late Night with Conan O'Brien when the band appeared there on 25 May 2007.

"Good Morning, Herr Horst" is the second single. It was only released in Germany; in the rest of Europe, TV & Me was released instead. The song is named for Horst Holtfreter (1957-2021), a German-born homeless busker who was known for playing the harmonica on the streets of central Stockholm.

"TV & Me" is the third single.

"The Wildfire (If It Was True)" is the fourth single. It was released as a download only, except for some radio promotional CDs. In the US, the single was expanded to an EP, removing the original B-side remix and adding three rare tracks from various European releases. "The Wildfire" appears in the video game NHL 08.

"Ochrasy" is the fifth and final single. The single was released on European iTunes Stores with no B-sides.
