= Ghosts&Phantoms =

Studio album by Mando Diao
- Released: January 2012
- Genre: Indie rock
- Label: Musica de la Santa

Mando Diao chronology
Above and Beyond - MTV Unplugged (2010)	Ghosts&Phantoms (2012)	Greatest Hits Volume 1 (2012)

Ghosts&Phantoms is a vinyl LP in limited edition from the Swedish rock band Mando Diao. In December 2011, 24 unpublished songs have been released as the band's Christmas calendar for download. Due to the immediate success, an LP was released in January, 2012, as limited edition of 500 pieces, containing 22 songs, and for free download.

== Track listing ==
=== Side A ===
No.	Title	Length
1.	"Sing The Bossanova"	3:03
2.	"Oh Doctor"	2:55
3.	"Last Night"	2:04
4.	"Miss Sweetride"	5:03
5.	"Sweet Sweet Love"	4:12
6.	"America"	3:19

=== Side B ===
No.	Title	Length
1.	"Hustler"	4:56
2.	"Uganda"	3:59
3.	"Sven Wolt"	1:00
4.	"How Do You Feel"	5:11
5.	"Out Of My Head"	3:08
6.	"Nothing Without Her"	2:22

=== Side C ===
No.	Title	Length
1.	"Libya"	4:19
2.	"Soul Jävle"	2:05
3.	"Sit On Me"	2:47
4.	"Letter From Yann"	2:59
5.	"Don´t You Worry"	2:08
6.	"And The Beat Goes On"	4:40
7.	"Diktigt"	0:51

=== Side D ===
No.	Title	Length
1.	"Baby"	5:21
2.	"The 39"	2:38
3.	"Seven Days Of Falling"	12:56
