= Mr. Moon (Mando Diao song) =

"Mr Moon"

Single by Mando Diao
- Released: 2002
- Genre: Garage rock
- Label: EMI Music Sweden, Majesty

Mando Diao singles chronology
"Motown Blood EP" (2002)	"Mr Moon" (2002)	"The Band" (2002)

"Mr. Moon" is the debut single by Swedish band Mando Diao. The single reached No. 33 on the Swedish charts. In response to a question asked by a fan on their website, the band confirmed that part of the song was about the Who's original drummer, Keith Moon.
