= Ælita =

Studio album by Mando Diao
- Released: 23 April 2014
- Genre: Synthpop, electronic rock
- Length: 53:44
- Label: Musica De La Santa
- Producer: Mando Diao

Mando Diao chronology
Infruset (2012)	Ælita (2014)	Good Times (2017)

Ælita is the seventh studio album by the Swedish band Mando Diao. The album introduces a new style for the band, using the Soviet analog synthesizer Aelita, after which it is named. The album features synthesizers and electronic drums.

== Track listing ==
The listed tracks are:

No.	Title	Length
1.	"Black Saturday"	3:22
2.	"Rooftop"	4:57
3.	"Money Doesn't Make You a Man"	5:06
4.	"Sweet Wet Dreams"	4:41
5.	"If I Don't Have You"	7:46
6.	"Baby"	6:44
7.	"Lonely Driver"	4:28
8.	"Child"	6:52
9.	"Romeo"	4:13
10.	"Make You Mine"	6:14

== Charts ==
=== Weekly charts ===
Chart (2014)	Peak position
Austrian Albums (Ö3 Austria)	14
German Albums (Offizielle Top 100)	6
Swedish Albums (Sverigetopplistan)	1
Swiss Albums (Schweizer Hitparade)	8

=== Year-end charts ===
Chart (2014)	Position
Swedish Albums (Sverigetopplistan)	50
