= Hurricane Bar =

Studio album by Mando Diao
- Released: 22 September 2004 (Sweden); 24 January 2005 (Germany); 8 March 2005 (USA)
- Genre: Garage rock
- Label: Mute Records
- Producer: Richard Rainey

Mando Diao chronology
Bring 'Em In (2002)	Hurricane Bar (2004)	Ode to Ochrasy (2006)

Singles from Hurricane Bar
- 1. "God Knows"; 2. "You Can't Steal My Love"; 3. "All My Senses"; 4. "Kingdom & Glory"; 5. "Ringing Bells"

Professional ratings
Review scores
Source	Rating
AllMusic	3.5/5 stars
Pitchfork Media	6.9/10
Rolling Stone	3/5 stars

Hurricane Bar is the second album from the Swedish band Mando Diao, released in 2004. The album was chosen as No. 92 of Amazon.com's Top 100 Editor's Picks of 2005.

The tracks for the limited edition's bonus disc were recorded at the Southside Festival in Tuttlingen (Germany) on 11 June 2005.

== Release ==
"Clean Town" is the first single taken from Hurricane Bar and their fourth single overall (not counting EPs). "Clean Town" was released in Japan as an EP, commonly known as the Japan Tour EP. The EP features an enhanced section with two live videos from a Japanese performance at the Harajuku Astro Hall. The B-sides, "Hail The Sunny Days" and "Your Lover's Nerve", both later appeared on the Swedish version of You Can't Steal My Love, the latter also appearing as a bonus track on the Japanese version of Hurricane Bar. The live version of "Little Boy Jr", recorded in Boston, from the Japanese EP has appeared on many Mando Diao releases, including the UK version of "God Knows", the US version of the Paralyzed EP and the German limited edition of Bring 'Em In.

The song itself is about the band's hometown of Borlänge. It was originally written as praising the town, but ended up sounding more hateful than intended. The song suggests that, instead of leaving, cleaning up the hometown can be another way of escaping. The song is about being proud of where you come from because it will always be a part of who you are. In talking about the song, Gustaf Norén has said "we will always have one foot in Borlänge and [one in] the rest in the world."

"God Knows" is the second single from Hurricane Bar. It was released in 2004, and the UK release features three B-side versions of the single all recorded live at the Paradise Rock Club in Boston. These live tracks have all previously appeared on the US Paralyzed EP, with "Little Boy Jr" also appearing on the Japan Tour EP and the limited edition of Bring 'Em In. "The Malevolence" also appeared on the UK version of You Can't Steal My Love. The song was written by singer/guitarist Gustaf Norén to co-singer/guitarist, Björn Dixgård. The song is about the pressure, as a celebrity, to behave under the spotlight, having all your mistakes magnified and causing problems. "As long as you're a band," Norén says of this song, "then you can count on each other. You will always get through every problem."

== Track listing ==
1. "Cut the Rope" – 1:51
2. "God Knows" – 3:52
3. "Clean Town" – 3:43
4. "Down in the Past" – 3:58
5. "You Can't Steal My Love" – 5:30
6. "Added Family" – 4:18
7. "Annie's Angle" – 3:04
8. "If I Leave You" – 2:53
9. "Ringing Bells" – 2:36
10. "This Dream Is Over" – 3:24
11. "White Wall" – 3:51
12. "All My Senses" – 4:13
13. "Kingdom & Glory" – 4:16
14. "Next to Be Lowered" – 3:45
- US bonus tracks
1. "Clean Town" (video)
2. "God Knows" (video)
3. "Down in the Past" (video)
- Japan bonus tracks
1. "Your Lover's Nerve" (B-side)
2. "Jeanette" (previously unreleased)
- Limited edition bonus tracks
1. "Son of Dad" (previously unreleased) – 4:39
2. "Telephone Song" (previously unreleased) – 4:01

=== Limited edition bonus disc ===
1. "Intro" – 1:13
2. "Cut the Rope" (Live) – 0:41
3. "Sweet Ride" (Live) – 3:01
4. "Paralyzed" (Live) – 4:24
5. "If I Leave You" (Live) – 2:59
6. "Added Family" (Live) – 4:15
7. "The Band" (Live) – 3:56
8. "White Wall" (Live) – 3:10
9. "Motown Blood" (Live) – 3:28
10. "Mr. Moon" (Live) – 4:41
11. "You Can't Steal My Love" (Live) – 6:31
12. "Annie's Angle" (Live) – 2:36
13. "Chi Ga" (Live) – 2:06
14. "Down in the Past" (Live) – 5:32
15. "God Knows" (Live) – 4:46
16. "Sheepdog" (Live) – 5:29

== Personnel ==
Mando Diao

- Björn Dixgard - vocals, guitars
- Gustaf Noren - vocals, guitars, organ, percussion
- Carl-Johan Fogelklou - bass, backing vocals, organ
- Samuel Giers - drums, percussion, backing vocals

Additional musicians

- Mats Björke - keyboards (tracks 2,4,5,6,10,11,12,14)
- Patrik Heikinpieti - percussion (tracks 7,9,12)
