= Give Me Fire! =

Studio album by Mando Diao
- Released: 13 February 2009
- Recorded: 2008 at Studio De la Santa & Redline Studio, Stockholm
- Genre: Indie rock, garage rock
- Length: 71:36
- Label: Universal Records
- Producer: The Salazar Brothers & Mando Diao

Mando Diao chronology
Never Seen the Light of Day (2007)	Give Me Fire! (2009)	The Malevolence of Mando Diao 2002-2007 (2009)

Give Me Fire! is the fifth studio album by Swedish band Mando Diao, produced by Salla Salazar of hip-hop group The Latin Kings and his brother Masse. The album was released in Sweden on 13 February 2009 and in the United States on 31 May 2011.

One of Mando Diao's roadies knew the hip hop producing brothers and introduced Gustaf Norén to them. Norén says he originally approached The Salazar Brothers as he is a massive Latin Kings fan and wanted to get an autograph, but the visit ended with a recorded song. After sitting on the song for a while he played it for the other members of the band and they decided to record more tracks with Salle & Masse.

Björn Dixgård says that the band has been inspired by movies and television with this album and cites Quentin Tarantino and Twin Peaks. He also says that the producers' record collection has been a source of inspiration as well.

This album is a danceable album with a strong focus on drums, bass and percussion. The final mix of the album was done in Los Angeles. Mastering was done by Mats "Limpman" Lindfors at Cuttingroom in Stockholm. It reached number one on the Swiss, the Austrian and the German album charts, while reaching number 2 in Sweden, only beaten by Bruce Springsteen's Working on a Dream.

The band played a special version of the album's first single entitled "Fight with Somebody" live at Arena AufSchalke in Gelsenkirchen for Wladimir Klitschko's fight versus Ruslan Chagaev on 20 June 2009.

Ahead of its UK release on 6 November 2009, Give Me Fire! was available in full on the UK music site ClashMusic.com alongside a photo gallery of the band on tour.

== Track listing ==
No.	Title	Length
1.	"Blue Lining, White Trenchcoat"	4:02
2.	"Dance with Somebody"	5:18
3.	"Gloria"	4:17
4.	"High Heels"	3:48
5.	"Mean Street"	4:32
6.	"Maybe Just Sad"	4:05
7.	"A Decent Life"	1:45
8.	"Give Me Fire"	4:01
9.	"Crystal"	6:11
10.	"Come On Come On"	4:13
11.	"Go Out Tonight"	4:53
12.	"You Got Nothing on Me"	5:07
13.	"The Shining / Leave My Fire"	19:22

=== Differences with United States release ===
- "Alone with Molly/In the Valley" (8:00) is featured as track 6 instead of "Maybe Just Sad".
- "The Shining" is (3:17) instead of (19:22).
- An additional track, "Nothing Without You" (3:41), is listed as track 14.

== Charts ==
=== Weekly charts ===
Weekly chart performance for Give Me Fire!
Chart (2009–2011)	Peak position
Austrian Albums (Ö3 Austria)	1
German Albums (Offizielle Top 100)	1
Dutch Albums (Album Top 100)	38
Swedish Albums (Sverigetopplistan)	2
Swiss Albums (Schweizer Hitparade)	1

=== Year-end charts ===
Year-end chart performance for Give Me Fire!
Chart (2009)	Position
German Albums (Offizielle Top 100)	17
Swedish Albums (Sverigetopplistan)	80
Swiss Albums (Schweizer Hitparade)	38
