= Bring 'Em In (Mando Diao album) =

Studio album by Mando Diao
- Released: 23 September 2002 (Sweden); 26 August 2003 (USA)
- Recorded: Sweden, 2001–2002
- Genre: Garage rock
- Length: 37:58
- Label: EMI, Majesty (Europe); Mute Records (USA)
- Producer: Ronald Bood and Mando Diao

Mando Diao chronology
The Braley Geshmore	Bring 'Em In (2002)	Hurricane Bar (2004)

Singles from Bring 'Em In
- 1. "Motown Blood"; 2. "Mr Moon"; 3. "The Band"; 4. "Sheepdog"; 5. "Paralyzed"

Professional ratings
Review scores
Source	Rating
AllMusic	3.5/5 stars
Pitchfork Media	(8.0/10)

Bring 'Em In is the debut album by the Swedish band Mando Diao, released 2002 in Sweden. In 2003 the album was released as both a CD and an LP internationally, and was well received by critics.

The Japan release of the album adds three bonus tracks, shuffled amongst the original track listing. In 2005, a limited edition of the album was released, adding a second disc of B-sides and demos.

== Singles and EP releases ==
The album spawned several singles in Sweden, "Motown Blood", "Mr Moon", "The Band", "Sheepdog" and "Paralyzed." Internationally, "Sheepdog" and "Paralyzed" were selected as the only singles.

Motown Blood EP was released in 2002 in Sweden by EMI Music Sweden as the first release from the band Mando Diao. The title track, "Little Boy Jr", and "Lady" later appeared on the band's first album, Bring 'Em In, while "A Picture of Them All" was only included on the Japanese version of the album, as a B-side on the Swedish Paralyzed EP and on the B-side compilation The Malevolence of Mando Diao 2002-2007.

"Mr Moon" was the debut single of the band and reached No. 37 on Swedish charts. "The Band" is about a fight between the band's two singers. It was written when singer-songwriter Gustaf Norén wanted to leave the band and move away from their hometown of Borlänge, Sweden. Björn Dixgård, the band's other singer-songwriter, wrote the chorus of the song to Norén after their fight to reveal his side of the argument. Norén returned to the band after hearing Dixgård's song. The band reconciled, and Norén wrote the verses to the song. "The Band" was released as a single in 2002. The B-side, "Driving Around" was released later on the Swedish Paralyzed EP and the Japanese single "Sheepdog".

The third single, "Sheepdog", failed to chart in Europe upon its initial release. The single was released in Japan as an EP with enhanced content. In 2004 the single was released as a 7" in the UK. Its B-side "How We Walk" was also released on the Paralyzed EP in Sweden and the US.

== Track listing ==
All songs by Björn Dixgård and Gustaf Norén.

- Regular edition
1. "Sheepdog" 3:35
2. "Sweet Ride" 2:03
3. "Motown Blood" 2:02
4. "Mr. Moon" 3:29
5. "The Band" 3:19
6. "To China with Love" 5:02
7. "Paralyzed" 4:09
8. "P.U.S.A." 2:38
9. "Little Boy Jr" 2:55
10. "Lady" 2:32
11. "Bring 'em In" 2:13
12. "Lauren's Cathedral" 4:01
- Japanese version
1. "Chi Ga" (The Band B-Side)
  Between "P.U.S.A." and "Little Boy Jr"
2. "A Picture of 'Em All" (Motown Blood EP B-Side])
3. "She's So" (B-Side)
  Between "Lady" and "Bring 'Em In"
- Limited edition bonus disc
1. "A Picture Of 'Em All" (Motown Blood EP B-Side)
2. "She's So" (B-Side)
3. "Chi Ga" (The Band B-Side)
4. "Driving Around" (The Band B-Side)
5. "And I Don't Know" (Sheepdog B-Side)
6. "How We Walk" (Sheepdog B-Side)
7. "Sheepdog (Acoustic)" (Sheepdog B-Side)
8. "Little Boy Jr (Live) (B-Side)
9. "P.U.S.A." (Alternate Version)
10. "Sweet Ride" (Demo)
11. "Mr. Moon" (Demo)
12. "The Band" (Demo)
13. "Next to Be Lowered" (Demo)
14. "Deadlock" (Previously Unreleased)
15. "Lauren's Cathedral" (Demo)
16. "Sadly Sweet Mary" (Previously Unreleased)
17. "Suffer Pain And Pity" (Previously Unreleased)
18. "Major Baby" (Previously Unreleased)
19. "White Wall" (Demo)
