= Infruset =

Studio album by Mando Diao
- Released: 31 October 2012 (Sweden); 2 November 2012 (GER, AUT, SWI)
- Genre: Indie rock
- Language: Swedish
- Label: Universal Records
- Producer: Björn Olsson

Mando Diao chronology
Greatest Hits Volume 1 (2012)	Infruset (00000000)	Ælita (2014)

Infruset is the sixth studio album by Swedish band Mando Diao and the band's first album in their native language, Swedish.

In 2011, on the occasion of Swedish poet Gustaf Fröding's (1860–1911) hundredth death year, Gustaf Norén was asked to set one of his poems to music. The beauty and honesty of Fröding's poetry as well as his eccentric and anguished way of living was appealing to the band.

Fröding's poetry is telling stories about the beauty of nature, about love and life's challenges. Gustaf Norén and Björn Dixgård chose ten of his poems; the album's recording took place in an old barn that was transformed into a studio, and was finished after a few days only.

The songs are slow and melancholic ballads. The band is using acoustic guitars and piano as main instruments; drums, bass and strings are providing the smooth and gentle background. The main focus is on Fröding's words, instruments and voices are emphasizing the melancholy within the lyrics.

Linnéa Dixgård, sister of Björn Dixgård, performs the song "Titania".

On 28 October 2012, the first public performance of Infruset was celebrated as cinema event with broadcasts in cinemas and theaters in Sweden, Germany and Switzerland. The premiere consisted of two parts – a biography of Gustaf Fröding and interviews with band members, and the live performance of the new songs.

Infruset has turned out to be the band's most successful album in Sweden. It has won a Swedish Grammis award and been certified 4× Platinum in Sweden. Due to their success, the band was awarded with the Swedish Rockbjörnen, a fan award, as best live group in 2013. The album has been in Swedish charts for 97 weeks from November 2012 until September 2014 and is the fourth in the list of "best albums of all times" in Sweden. The single Strövtåg i hembygden remained in Swedish radio top ten charts for 100 weeks in October 2014.

== Track listing ==
The listed tracks are:

No.	Title	Length
1.	"Den självslagne"	1:50
2.	"En sångarsaga"	6:37
3.	"Infruset"	5:23
4.	"I ungdomen"	3:22
5.	"Snigelns visa"	3:52
6.	"Strövtåg i hembygden"	4:08
7.	"Men"	2:56
8.	"En ung mor"	3:00
9.	"Titania"	3:24
10.	"Gråbergssång"	3:08

== Infruset gold edition ==
A special gold edition was released with 19 tracks, including the 10 original tracks, and 9 additional tracks (including two bonus tracks and seven "demo versions" from the track list) as follows:

=== Bonus tracks ===
- 11. "Säv säv Susa (bonus track)
- 12. "Dagg" (bonus track)

=== Demo versions ===
- 13. "En Sångarsaga" (demo version)
- 14. "Den Självslagne" (demo version)
- 15. "Snigelns visa" (demo version)
- 16. "Infruset" (demo version)
- 17. "Men" (demo version)
- 18. "Strövtåg i hembygden" (demo version)
- 19. "Titania" (demo version)

== Charts ==
Infruset became an immediate success in Sweden – one week after the album's release it reached number one on the Swedish Albums Chart and was certified gold in the country. It is also the band's first album to enter the Norwegian Albums Chart.

=== Weekly charts ===
Chart (2012)	Peak position
Norwegian Albums (VG-lista)	33
Swedish Albums (Sverigetopplistan)	1
Swiss Albums (Schweizer Hitparade)	97

=== Year-end charts ===
Chart (2012)	Position
Swedish Albums (Sverigetopplistan)	1
Chart (2013)	Position
Swedish Albums (Sverigetopplistan)	3
Chart (2014)	Position
Swedish Albums (Sverigetopplistan)	42

== Certifications ==
Certifications for Infruset
Region	Certification	Certified units/sales
Sweden (GLF)	4× Platinum	160,000^{‡}
^{‡} Sales+streaming figures based on certification alone.
