= Mando Diao =

Rock band from Borlänge, Sweden

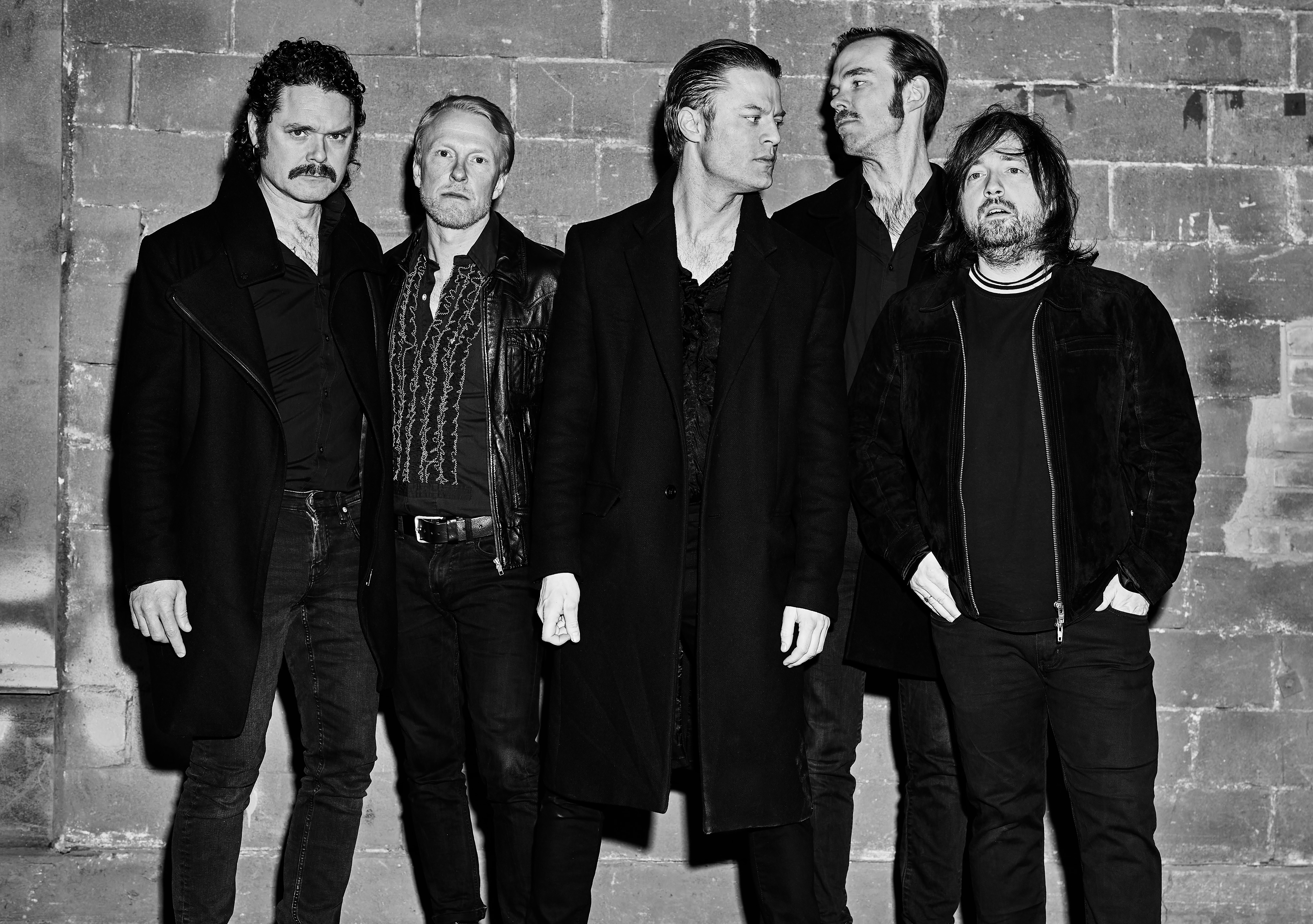
- Mando Diao in 2023

Background information
- Origin: Borlänge, Dalarna County, Sweden
- Genres: Alternative rock; indie rock; pop rock; garage rock revival; post-punk; dance-punk
- Years active: 1999–present
- Labels: Universal; Nettwerk; Mute; EMI; Majesty; Playground Music Scandinavia
- Members: Björn Dixgård; Carl-Johan Fogelklou; Daniel Haglund; Patrik Heikinpieti; Håkan Sörle
- Past members: Samuel Giers; Mats Björke; Gustaf Norén; Jens Siverstedt
- Website: www.mandodiao.com

Mando Diao is an alternative rock band from Borlänge, Sweden. The band got their breakthrough with the release of the album Hurricane Bar. Their main fan base is in Sweden, Germany, Austria, Switzerland and Japan. Band members are Björn Dixgård (vocals, guitar), Carl-Johan Fogelklou (bass), Daniel Haglund (keyboard) and Patrik Heikinpieti (drums).

== History ==
=== Early years (1999–2002) ===
The roots of Mando Diao date back to 1999 when Björn Dixgård (vocals, guitar) and Daniel Haglund (keyboard) played in a band called Butler, which they had founded in the middle of the 1990s. In 1996, Gustaf Norén (vocals, guitar), joined the band. In 1999, Carl-Johan Fogelklou (bass, backing vocals) and Samuel Giers (drums) became members and completed the original band. The current line-up decided to take the project more seriously. Björn Dixgård and Gustaf Norén locked themselves up in a summer house and spent 14 months writing songs. They claim the Beatles as their original source of inspiration. Allegedly, Gustaf joined the band after he and Björn had talked all night about this band. The two renamed their band Mando Diao, a name that appeared to Björn Dixgård in a dream in which a man came up to him and shouted "Mando Diao!".

Mando Diao made their first public performances in the clubs of their hometown Borlänge in 1999. A local writer described them in an article as the best unsigned band he had ever seen. This was soon followed by a record deal with EMI Sweden.

=== First breakthrough (2002–05) ===
The release of their debut album Bring 'Em In in 2002, and of their first single "Sheepdog" made the band popular in Sweden; the 1960s and 1970s music style and sound as well as the singers´ voices were soon seen as the "typical" Mando Diao sound by their fans. Gustaf Norén once compared Bring 'Em In to music by The Kooks, the Small Faces and The Kinks, declaring his band's music best and even better than many albums by The Beatles or The Rolling Stones.
The band began touring Sweden and other Scandinavian countries together with local bands as The Hellacopters or Kent.

Daniel Haglund left the band in 2003, due to some minor disputes, and was replaced by Mats Björke.

=== International success (2005–11) ===
With every album release, the band's international success increased; in 2007 Mando Diao appeared for the first time as headliner on a music festival, the Live Earth concert in Hamburg.

After the recording of Above And Beyond - MTV unplugged, Samuel Giers left the band at the beginning of 2011. Since September 2011, Mando Diao is supported by Patrik Heikinpieti (drums) and Daniel Haglund (guitar, keyboard).

=== Swedish album Infruset (2012) ===
In 2011, Gustaf Norén and Björn Dixgård began working on poems written by the Swedish poet Gustaf Fröding, and setting them to music. The result, their first album in Swedish, Infruset, was highly rated and appreciated all over Europe even before the official release . On 28 October 2012, the world premiere was broadcast as a live cinema event - Mando Diao live på bio in theaters and cinemas in Sweden, Germany and Switzerland.

Infruset has turned out to be the band's most successful album in Sweden: it has won a Swedish Grammis award, sold four times platinum in Sweden. Due to their success, the band was awarded with the Swedish Rockbjörnen, a fan award, as best livegroup in 2013. The album has been charting on the Swedish Albums Chart for 101 weeks from November 2012 until June 2015 and is Sweden's 9th all-time best-charting album. The single "Strövtåg i hembygden" remained in the Swedish radio top ten charts for 127 weeks in May 2015.

=== New influences and reorientation (since 2012) ===
On 23 April 2014 Mando Diao's seventh studio album Ælita was released in Sweden; the international release was on 2 May 2014. The first single, "Black Saturday", was released in Sweden on 11 January 2014. The new synth rock sound has led to many disputes amongst fans of the band and critics. The Russian synthesizer "Aelita" has been the source and inspiration for this album, leading away from the former music style.

On 18 November 2014, keyboard player Mats Björke officially left the band. His main focus is on working as producer in his own studio.

=== Projects (2015) ===
On 16 October 2014, "Love Last Forever", the official song for the ski world championship 2015 in Falun, featuring Maxida Märak, a young Swedish-Sámi artist and, who by her singing and wearing Sámi clothes while performing this song is raising awareness for the minority problems in Sweden, has been presented to the public. On 15 February 2015 "Love Last Forever" was performed during the opening ceremony in Falun.

With their new song "Leave No Trace" (March 2015) Mando Diao are supporting Låt Östersjön Leva - a project under the patronage of World Wildlife Fund for Nature (WWF); the issue is the protection of the wildlife and the heavily polluted Baltic Sea.

Björn Dixgård and Gustaf Norén, who emphasized the importance of all kinds of art, have supported the annual street art and music festival 164 festivalen by KFUM in Stockholm on 30 April 2015.

=== New era (2015) ===
On 3 June 2015, Gustaf Norén and Mando Diao separated. Norén was replaced by Jens Siverstedt on guitar and vocals.

=== Albums (2017–2023) ===
On 12 May 2017, Mando Diao released their eighth studio album, Good Times. The first single was released on 7 April 2017.

On 18 October 2019, BANG was released as Mando Diao's ninth studio album, continuing the band's rock history.

On 12 June 2020, Mando Diao returned to the Swedish language with I Solnedgången - once again revisiting the poems by Gustaf Fröding, as well as adding lyrics written by Björn Dixgård's parents.

2022 saw the band back on the road promoting I solnedgången in the Nordics as well as releasing a string of EPs leading up the band's 11th studio album Boblikov's Magical World, released on 29 April 2023. Håkan Sörle was introduced as the band's new guitarist on the show's following the album release.

== Recordings ==
In September 2002, their first album Bring 'Em In was released in Sweden. It contains early demo versions of their songs, partly recorded in the basement of keyboardist Daniel Haglund. In 2003, the album was released internationally by MUTE label, along with their debut single Sheepdog.

As of 2004, the band is hailed enthusiastically by the music press as one of the most sanguine newcomer bands of the year. Their second album Hurricane Bar was released in March 2004 and became an immediate international success. Their third album, Ode to Ochrasy, was released on 24 August 2006 and again was praised by the international music press, being unanimously described as the band's best album. By the end of 2006, the band released a DVD called Down in the Past, a documentary of the band's history, accompanied by rare interviews, concert snippets, backstage videos and unreleased songs. Ode to Ochrasy was released in the UK through the Nettwerk label on 2 April 2007, in a previously unreleased format including 4 bonus tracks. On 26 October 2007 the band released their fourth album Never Seen The Light Of Day.

Their fifth album, Give Me Fire, was released on 13 February 2009. The album's first single, Dance with Somebody, was released on 9 January 2009 and became the most sold single and most popular song of Mando Diao so far. The Malevolence Of Mando Diao 2002 - 2007 is a collection of B-sides and previously unreleased songs and was released on 12 October 2009. On 12 November 2010, the recording of their MTV Unplugged performance, Above And Beyond - MTV Unplugged, was released as CD and DVD. In December 2011, the band published Ghosts&Phantoms, a Christmas calendar for download, containing 24 non-released songs. Due to the calendar's success, Ghosts&Phantoms was released as vinyl LP limited edition. Mando Diao's Greatest Hits Volume 1 album was released on 6 January 2012, representing a collection of the band's best known songs.

Infruset, was released on 31 October 2012. It is the band's first album in their mother tongue, ten poems of Swedish poet Gustaf Fröding set to music. The album Infruset Guld, containing new Swedish songs and studio versions, was released on 5 June 2013.

A new album called Ælita was released in April 2014. The single "Black Saturday" was released in Sweden on 11 January. In contrast to earlier records of the band, Ælita belongs to the electronic rock genre. The album also features the cover shot for a gay magazine. This album has been released in Auro 3D immersive sound.

== Touring ==
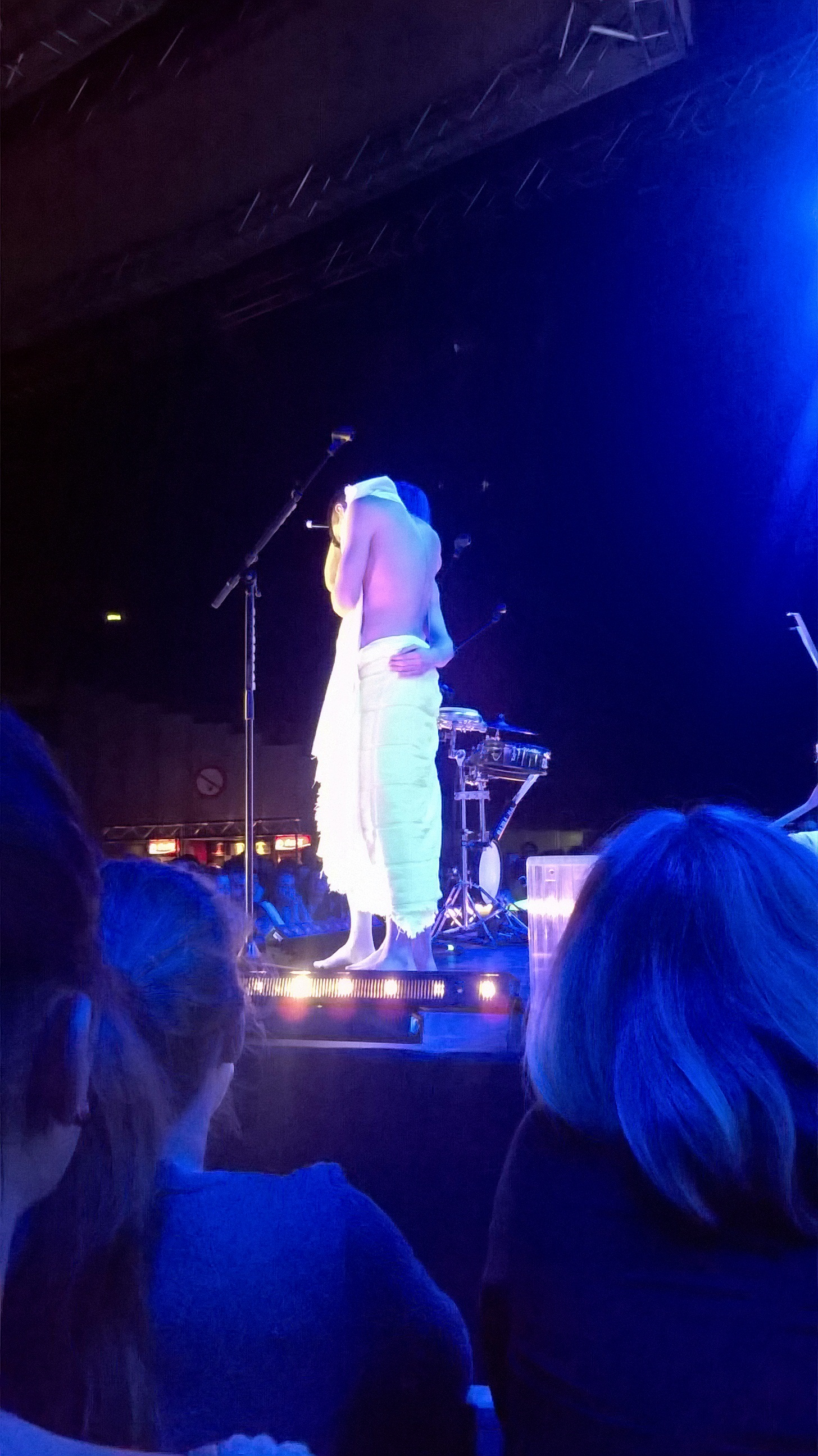
Mando Diao in Vienna performing "If I don't have you" - Aelita tour 2014

Mando Diao has been touring all over the world, though their biggest following is in Germany, Japan, and their homeland Sweden. In 2004/2005, they started a tour with appearances at big music festivals in Germany, Austria and Hungary. The band supported The Bravery on their tour in 2005, along with the Los Angeles band The Colour. On their 2006 European tour, they were supported by Razorlight and Johnossi, and for the British leg of the tour they were a joint support act for the Dirty Pretty Things along with Larrikin Love.

At the end of January 2007, Mando Diao were widely covered in the Swedish media because of an incident at their live concert on 27 January 2007. They were performing at the Amplified festival at Norrlands Opera House in Umeå when a part of the floor the audience was standing on collapsed, leaving at least 25 fans hurt. Five people were taken to the hospital with injuries such as broken arms and legs. According to the management of Norrlandsoperan, the hall had been checked, but they had never thought the floor, consisting of several moveable parts on concrete girders over a three-meter-deep (9.8 ft) hole, wouldn't hold the 170 people in the room, since the fire department had given them approval for 800 people. After this unfortunate event, Mando Diao stayed in Umeå in case they could do anything to help the injured fans. They also visited the hospitalized fans personally.

Mando Diao appeared on 29 April 2007 at the Coachella Valley Music and Arts Festival and on 7 July 2007 they performed at the German leg of Live Earth in Hamburg. Since the summer of 2007, Mando Diao has had support from a horn section consisting of renowned Swedish jazz musicians Nils Janson and Nils Berg.

Björn Dixgård toured Europe solo during the end of 2007.

On 3 November 2008 the band played one US date for the "Give Me Fire" tour with the Capshuns and We Barbarians at the Troubadour in Los Angeles.

On 2 September 2010 they recorded an MTV Unplugged concert at Union Film-Studios in Berlin, featuring guest appearances by Daniel Haglund, Ray Davies, Klaus Voormann, Juliette Lewis and Lana Del Rey. The concert was released on CD and DVD in late 2010.

Following the unplugged album, an acoustic tour was started in October 2011, with concerts taking place in Germany, Switzerland and Luxembourg.

In the summer of 2012, Mando Diao had appearances at four open air festivals in Croatia, Italy, Czech Republic and Hungary.

Mando Diao toured Sweden in the winter of 2013 and a Swedish summer tour (Folkparksturné) followed in the summer of 2013.

In 2014, there were appearances at open air festivals in Spain, Germany, Switzerland, Austria, Netherlands and Sweden. In November 2014, an autumn tour including Sweden, Germany, Luxembourg, Netherlands, Switzerland and Austria, took place.

== Caligola ==
As of late 2011, Björn Dixgård and Gustaf Norén have a new side project with the Salazar Brothers, called Caligola. The project's first single, "Sting of Battle", was released on 27 December 2011, followed by the first album, Back to Earth, on 24 February 2012. The second single "Forgive Forget" was certified gold in Germany in May 2012.

In 2012, they appeared on the 10th track of Paul van Dyk's album Evolution, titled "If You Want My Love".

== Discography ==
- 2002: Bring 'em In
- 2004: Hurricane Bar
- 2006: Ode to Ochrasy
- 2007: Never Seen the Light of Day
- 2009: Give Me Fire!
- 2012: Infruset
- 2014: Ælita
- 2017: Good Times
- 2019: Bang
- 2020: I Solnedgången
- 2023: Boblikov's Magical World

== Band members ==
Current members

- Björn Dixgård - vocals, guitar (1999–present)
- Carl-Johan Fogelklou - bass, backing vocals (1999–present)
- Daniel Haglund - keyboards, organ (1999–2003; 2011–present)
- Patrik Heikinpieti - drums, percussion (2011–present)
- Håkan Sörle - guitar, backing vocals (2023–present)

Former members

- Gustaf Norén - vocals, guitar (1999–2015)
- Samuel Giers - drums, percussion (1999–2011)
- Mats Björke - keyboards, organs (2004–2014)
- Jens Siverstedt - guitar, backing vocals (2015–2022)

Timeline

== See also ==
- Swedish pop music
