= Never Seen the Light of Day =

Studio album by Mando Diao
- Released: 22 October 2007
- Genre: Rock
- Length: 41:06
- Label: EMI
- Producer: Björn Olsson

Mando Diao chronology
Ode to Ochrasy (2006)	Never Seen the Light of Day (2007)	Give Me Fire! (2009)

Professional ratings
Review scores
Source	Rating
Svenska dagbladet	5/6 stars

Never Seen the Light of Day is the fourth studio album by Swedish band Mando Diao. The album was produced by Björn Olsson and engineered by Patrik Heikinpieti. It was recorded in 2007 while the band were on an exhaustive tour of the world. Frontman Björn Dixgård stated in an interview that the band was dissatisfied with their management and tired of the tediousness of the studios so they recorded the album independently in a small studio with producer Björn Olsson. The album was titled Never Seen the Light of Day because the band believed that the album might not be released, and thus would not see the light of day.

The album was preceded by a single, "If I Don't Live Today, I Might Be Here Tomorrow", on 24 September 2007. The songs are said to be calmer and more sensitive than the band's usual style. A limited edition of the album was released (on the same day as the regular edition) in a special digipak.

The cover for the album (and the accompanying single) bears a strong resemblance to the covers used by Morrissey and the Smiths for many of their releases.

== Track listing ==
1. "If I Don't Live Today, Then I Might Be Here Tomorrow" – 2:00
2. "Never Seen the Light of Day" – 4:12
3. "Gold" – 3:54
4. "I Don't Care What the People Say" – 1:51
5. "Mexican Hardcore" – 4:37
6. "Macadam Cowboy" – 1:42
7. "Train On Fire" – 2:52
8. "Not A Perfect Day" – 2:54
9. "Misty Mountains" – 2:24
10. "One Blood" – 6:42
11. "Dalarna" – 7:54

== Personnel ==
Mando Diao

- Björn Dixgard – vocals, guitars
- Gustaf Noren – vocals, guitars
- Samuel Giers – drums, percussion
- Mats Björke – keyboards
- C-J – bass

Additional musicians

- Johan Andersson
- Fru Palm
- Nadja Jahlert
- Lina Molander
- Karin Hagström
- Olga Lantz
- Elin Sydhagen
- Calle Noren
- Fedrik Wennerlund
- Björn Olsson
- Hans Asteberg
- Pontus Ottestig
- Mikael Fahleryd
- Stefan Bellnas
- Livet Nord
- Erik Drougge
- Brita Linmark
- Jonas Franke-Blom

Recording personnel

- Patrik Heikinpieti – Recording at Rekord Studios and at Cosmos Studios, Stockholm
- Hans Asteberg – Mixing, Recording at Sehr Schön, Orust
- Björn Olsson – String arrangements, Engineering, Mixing, Recording at Sehr Schön, Orust
- Henryk Lipp – Engineering
- Dragan Tanaskovic – Mastering at Bohus Mastering, Kungalv
- Gustaf Girnstedt – String arrangements

Artwork

- Fredrik Wennerlund – Artwork and collages
- Pernilla Wahlin Noren – Collage drawings
- Matt Wignall – Band photo
