= Katana (disambiguation) =

Katana are traditionally-made Japanese swords.

Katana may also refer to:

== Arts, entertainment and media ==
- Katana (band), Swedish heavy metal band
- Katana, a martial arts web series on Strike.TV

=== Fictional characters and entities ===
- Katana (DC Comics), a DC Comics fictional character
- Katana, a character from Gargoyles animated TV series and comic books
- Katana, a character from the anime series Coyote Ragtime Show
- General Katana, a character from the film Highlander II: The Quickening
- Katana, a flagship in Star Wars novel Dark Force Rising

== People ==
- Randy Katana (born 1965), trance musician from Sint Maarten
- Mohamed Katana (born 1999), Kenyan footballer
- Stanislav Katana (born 1992), Ukrainian footballer
- Suvad Katana (1969–2005), Bosnian footballer
- John Katana, leader of Kenyan band Them Mushrooms
- Katana Chance (born 1990), American professional wrestler and gymnast

== Places ==
- Katana Electoral District, former electoral district in Sri Lanka
  - Katana Divisional Secretariat
- Katana (village), Phillaur, Jalandhar District of Punjab State, India
- Qatana, place in Syria, formerly spelled Katana
- Qatana District, District in Syria

== Technology ==
- Boss Katana, an instrument amplifier series
- Sanyo Katana, a mobile phone
- Katana, a development name for the Dreamcast home video console
- Katana (photocopier), a photocopier manufactured by Ricoh
- Katana, a forage harvester machines by Fendt
- Katana class engines, by Masten Space Systems
- Fender Katana, a guitar
- Project Katana, Microsoft Open Web Interface for .NET software
- Katana, lighting and look development software by The Foundry Visionmongers
- Creative Labs Sound Blaster Katana soundbar
- Kata-Ana, terms coined by Charles Howard Hinton for directions of extra coordinate axis in four-dimensional space

== Transportation ==
- Diamond DA20 Katana, a light aircraft
- Terzi T30 Katana, aerobatic aircraft
- UP Katana, a paraglider by UP International
- Suzuki Katana, a motorcycle
  - Suzuki Katana AY50, a scooter
- Suzuki Katana, Indonesian version of Suzuki Jimny
- Enigma (yacht), formerly Katana, a superyacht

== See also ==
- Kitana (disambiguation)
- Katanga (disambiguation)
- Catania, a city in Sicily
- Qatana, a city in Syria
- Qatanna, a Palestinian town in the West Bank
