= New Spring =

2004 novel by Robert Jordan

- Cover of New Spring expanded novel, showing Moiraine and Lan
- Author: Robert Jordan
- Cover artist: Darrell K. Sweet
- Language: English
- Series: The Wheel of Time
- Genre: Fantasy
- Publisher: Tor Books (USA)
- Publication date: 6 January 2004
- Publication place: United States
- Media type: Print (hardback and paperback)
- Pages: 304
- ISBN: 0-7653-0629-8 (Hardcover) ISBN 0-7653-4545-5 (Paperback)
- OCLC: 53099006
- Dewey Decimal: 813/.54 22
- LC Class: PS3560.O7617 N49 2004
- Preceded by: The Strike at Shayol Ghul
- Followed by: The Eye of the World

New Spring is a fantasy novel by American author Robert Jordan, a prequel in the Wheel of Time series. New Spring consists of 26 chapters and an epilogue.

== Background to publication ==
"New Spring" was originally published as a novella in the speculative fiction anthology edited by Robert Silverberg entitled Legends: Short Novels by the Masters of Modern Fantasy, released on 25 August 1998, just before the 1998 publication of The Path of Daggers (Book 8 of The Wheel of Time). Jordan later expanded the novella into a standalone novel (though of significantly shorter length than typical Wheel of Time books), which was then published by Tor Books in January 2004, between the 2003 publication of Crossroads of Twilight (Book 10) and the 2005 publication of Knife of Dreams (Book 11).

The New Spring novel was originally conceived of as the first in a trilogy of prequel novels. The second and third were to focus on Tam serving in the Illianer army and finding Rand, and Moiraine and Lan's journeys and discoveries to reach the Two Rivers just before the events of the first novel. Jordan's original plan was to write the trilogy before books 11 and 12 of the main series, but he was disappointed with New Spring's reception and decided to postpone this until after the main series was completed. However, his death on 16 September 2007—before the completion of the final novel in the series—makes this highly unlikely.

The first paperback edition of New Spring, released on 13 June 2005, gave readers the first look at Knife of Dreams (Book 11), as it featured an advance excerpt of part of the prologue of Knife of Dreams.

== Plot summary ==
Twenty years before the beginning of the series, Aes Sedai Gitara Moroso, the Keeper of the Chronicles, Foretells that the Dragon has been reborn. Moiraine Damodred, Siuan Sanche, and the Amyrlin Seat Tamra Ospenya are the only people to witness it. Tamra decides to give a bounty to every woman who gave birth in the camps around Tar Valon during the last week to get a list of babies who could possibly be the Dragon Reborn. Initially, Moiraine and Siuan go with the other Accepted to record names of candidates for the bounty, but the following day are told to spend their time copying some of the less-legible lists, which gives them the opportunity to create their own list of babies who could be the Dragon Reborn.

Tamra orders Moiraine to give a letter to Aes Sedai Kerene Nagashi asking her to meet the Amyrlin. Other Aes Sedai receive similar summons, leading Moiraine and Siuan to believe they are being sent out to search for the Dragon Reborn. The sisters who had been summoned leave Tar Valon, and after, Tamra is found dead.

After Moiraine and Siuan are raised to Aes Sedai, Moiraine leaves Tar Valon to search for the Dragon Reborn herself. She travels to the city of Canluun, where she meets Merean Redhill (Tamra's Mistress of Novices) and the legendary Aes Sedai Cadsuane Melaidhrin. Siuan meets her there and informs her that all the Aes Sedai Tamra sent out of the Tower are dead, leading them to believe the Black Ajah, a secret faction sworn to the Dark One, is attempting to thwart their hunt for the Dragon Reborn.

As the Aiel War ends, Lan rides to Canluun with his companion Bukama, where he meets a friend of his called Ryne. Ryne tells them that Lan’s carneira (first lover) Edeyn Arrel, intends to raise Malkier’s banner of the Golden Crane, summoning the nation’s remaining people to ride back to try to reclaim their home. The three decide to ride to Edeyn in Chachin to disuade her.

Moiraine, also riding from Canluun to Chachin, encounters Lan's group on the road. She initially keeps her distance, following them from behind as she is suspicious of them. She meets the group, and claims the right of a woman alone to be escorted to Chachin to meet one of the mothers on her list. They agree, though Lan is suspicious of her and believes that she has been sent by Edeyn.

The group arrive at Chachin. Moiraine meets with Siuan again, who has located the next mother on their list, Ines, in the Aesdaishar Palace. Lan, Bukama and Ryne immediately go to the Aesdaishar Palace where they meet Brys, Prince-Consort to Queen Ethenielle of Kandor. Moiraine enters the palace and uses her noble lineage to get her and Siuan a room there.

Lan meets Edeyn, who attempts to persuade Lan to become the King of Malkier, though she fails, and tells him that she plans for him to marry her daughter Iselle, in which Lan has little choice as, with no living relatives, his carneira has the right to arrange his marriage.

In the Palace, Moiraine is avoiding encountering Lan. She runs into Merean in the Palace and, suspicious she may be Black Ajah, Moiraine finally talks to Lan and asks him and Bukama to spy on Merean for her. Iselle asks Moiraine to enroll her at the White Tower but Moiraine dismisses her. Bukama later tells Siuan that Merean had a meeting with Brys.

Learning that Edeyn intends to marry Lan to Iselle soon, Lan searches for Bukama so they can flee. As he does so, his feet are pulled from under him with the One Power and he falls down a flight of stairs. A servant then tells Lan that Bukama has been stabbed, and he finds Bukama dead in his room. Angry, Lan goes to find Moiraine and tells her what has happened.

Lan blames Bukama’s death on Aes Sedai schemes. Moiraine, now sure Merean is of the Black Ajah, realises that everyone’s in danger. They rush to find Merean, and reach a large balcony where they find Ryne and Merean, who has trapped Iselle, Brys and Diryk (the Queen’s son) with Air. They discover Iselle brought the other two to Merean believing she would take her to the White Tower afterwards, that Ryne is a Darkfriend, and that he killed Bukama for spying on Merean. A fight ensues, and Lan kills Ryne and Moiraine kills Merean, but not before Merean kills Brys, Diryk, and Iselle.

Moiraine incinerates Merean’s and Ryne’s corpses, as the White Tower would be disgraced if the Black Ajah were found to be real. Siuan finds that Ines’ son was born in a farmhouse, and so cannot be the Dragon Reborn. They realise that Merean’s target was Diryk as they thought his luck might be because he was the Dragon Reborn. This gives them hope, as they realise the Black Ajah have less information about the Dragon Reborn’s identity than them.

They decide that Siuan will return to White Tower and use the Blue Ajah’s spy network to gather intel regarding the Black Ajah and the Dragon Reborn’s identity while Moiraine continues searching. Moiraine finds Lan and asks him to be her Warder. Lan agrees, and she bonds him.

== Graphic novel ==
It is also the first of Jordan's works to be adapted to graphic novel format. Issue #1 was published in July 2005. It ran eight issues total. It was produced by DB Pro, who previously adapted "The Legend of Huma" by Richard A. Knaak and "The Hedge Knight" by George R. R. Martin and published by Red Eagle Entertainment.

The comics are adapted by Chuck Dixon, drawn by Mike S. Miller, colored by Etienne St Laurent, edited by Ernst Dabel, lettered by Artmonkeys, with design by Bill Tortolini.

All eight issues were collected and re-released together as a single graphic novel in January 2011. It includes extra bonus material of developmental art, script pages, and correspondence between Jordan and Dixon.

Issue #	Issue title	Book chapters covered	Release date
1	"The Hook"	1, 2	July 2005
2	"Practice"	3–5	August 2005
3	"Shreds of Serenity"	6–8	September 2005
4	"It Begins"	9–11	November 2005
5	"Business in the City"	12–14	December 2005
6	"The Deep"	15–18	April 2009
7	"Pond Water"	19–22	July 2009
8	"The Evening Star"	23-26, Epilogue	May 2010
