= Kantana (disambiguation) =

Kantana is a Thai production company. Kantana may also refer to:

- Kantana language
- Kantana Institute, an educational institute in Thailand founded in 2010

== See also ==
- Katana (disambiguation)
