= The Gathering Storm (novel) =

2009 novel by Robert Jordan and Brandon Sanderson

- Original cover of The Gathering Storm featuring Rand al'Thor with Aviendha in front of a burnt out manor.
- Author: Robert Jordan and Brandon Sanderson
- Cover artist: Darrell K. Sweet (US)
- Language: English
- Series: The Wheel of Time
- Genre: Fantasy
- Publisher: Tor Books, Orbit Books
- Publication date: October 27, 2009
- Publication place: United States
- Media type: Print (hardcover and paperback), audiobook, e-book
- Pages: 783 (hardcover)
- ISBN: 0-7653-0230-6
- OCLC: 318422996
- Preceded by: Knife of Dreams
- Followed by: Towers of Midnight

The Gathering Storm is a fantasy novel by American writers Robert Jordan and Brandon Sanderson, the twelfth book in the series The Wheel of Time. It was incomplete when Jordan died on September 16, 2007, from cardiac amyloidosis. His widow Harriet McDougal and his publisher Tom Doherty chose Sanderson to continue the book.

Jordan originally intended to finish the series in a single volume titled A Memory of Light. However, when Sanderson began writing the book, it became clear that a single volume would be too large to print. The expected final book was split into three volumes: The Gathering Storm, Towers of Midnight, and A Memory of Light. The books would be published a year apart with the first volume, The Gathering Storm, published on October 27, 2009; a week earlier than originally announced. Upon its release, it immediately rose to the No. 1 position on The New York Times hardcover fiction Best Seller list, making it the fifth consecutive Wheel of Time book to achieve this feat.

The three books comprise what can be considered Jordan's final vision of the series. In the foreword, Sanderson states that they can be thought of as "the three volumes of A Memory of Light or as the final three books of The Wheel of Time. Both are correct." He also comments on the differing writing style, suggesting that it could be compared to different film directors directing the same script. The Gathering Storm consists of a prologue, 50 chapters, and an epilogue.

== Plot summary ==
The series' storyline has been leading up to the "Last Battle" (Tarmon Gai'don)—a fight between the forces of Light and Shadow. According to prophecy in the series the primary protagonist Rand al'Thor, as the Dragon Reborn, will "fight the [battle]", and must be present for the forces of Light to have a chance at winning and stopping the being known as the Dark One, the primary antagonist, from escaping his prison.

The Gathering Storm follows many plot threads but focuses on two characters, Rand al'Thor and Egwene al'Vere. While it follows al'Thor's attempts to unite and rally the world's forces for the Last Battle, it also addresses his struggle with his sanity, caused by the corruption of his mind from the use of the male half of the One Power. The unification of the White Tower, the headquarters of the female users of the One Power known as Aes Sedai, is addressed from al'Vere's perspective, as well as the exposure of the Black Ajah, a secretive and opposing faction within the story. While the stories of other main characters such as Perrin Aybara and Mat Cauthon are briefly touched upon, they have little bearing on the main plot line. Some main characters such as Elayne Trakand and Lan Mandragoran do not appear at all, but are referred to.

=== Synopsis ===
==== Rand al'Thor ====
As Rand's story begins, he is restoring order in the nation of Arad Doman while searching for Graendal, one of the Dark One's favored servants known as the Forsaken. The Aes Sedai work with Rand to interrogate Semirhage, another Forsaken captured at the end of Knife of Dreams. After being freed by her allies, Semirhage is given a Domination Band, an item used to control male channelers, and locks it around Rand's neck. She and Black Ajah sister Elza Penfell use it to make him torture and attempt to kill his lover, Min Farshaw. Unable to channel, he reaches out and inexplicably accesses the True Power, a different power normally only granted by the Dark One, using it to free himself and kill Semirhage and Elza. After this, he resolves to make himself harder and emotionless. He banishes his adviser Cadsuane Melaidhrin for not securing the Domination Band, promising to kill her if he sees her face again.

Rand meets with the Seanchan, a civilization that invaded the continent earlier in the series. Their leader Tuon rejects Rand's offer of a truce after sensing a dark aura that emanated from Rand after he channeled the True Power. Following the meeting, Tuon declares herself Empress and prepares a surprise attack against the White Tower.

Graendal's hiding place is traced to a remote palace. Confirming her presence, Rand uses the Choedan Kal, a powerful magical artifact, to eliminate the entire building with balefire, a magic that wipes the target from time. This horrifies Min and Nynaeve al'Meara and they turn to Cadsuane for help. Giving up on saving Arad Doman from the Seanchan and starvation, Rand returns to the city of Tear.

Nynaeve, under the instruction of Cadsuane, locates Tam al'Thor, Rand's father, who meets with Rand in an attempt to break his emotional isolation. Rand becomes angry when he learns that Tam was sent by Cadsuane, nearly killing his father before fleeing in horror at what he had almost done. Rand Travels to the Seanchan-held city of Ebou Dar, intending to destroy their entire army, but he becomes reluctant to act after seeing how peaceful the city is. Nearly mad with rage and grief, he Travels to the top of Dragonmount, the location where he killed himself in a past life. Angry at the futility of life bound to the Wheel, he uses the Choedan Kal to draw enough power to destroy the world. Lews Therin, a voice in Rand's head from his past life, suggests that by being reborn one has the opportunity to do things right. Agreeing, Rand turns the power of the Choedan Kal against itself, destroying it. Rand is finally able to laugh again.

==== Egwene al'Vere ====
The second main plot thread follows Egwene al'Vere, leader of the rebel faction of Aes Sedai. After her capture by the White Tower in the previous book, Egwene works to undermine Elaida a'Roihan's rule and mend the strife it is causing in the White Tower. She is initially granted freedom of the tower as novice, but after publicly denouncing Elaida, Elaida names her a follower of the Dark One, and orders her imprisonment. When Elaida fails to prove her accusation, Egwene is released.

Egwene returns to her room to find Verin Mathwin, who announces that she is of the Black Ajah. Taking advantage of a loophole in the oath Verin had sworn that she could not betray them "until the hour of my death", she fatally poisons herself, allowing her to use her last hour to reveal everything she has learned to Egwene. Verin explains that although she was forced to swear to them or face death, she used the position to research the Ajah. She gives Egwene a journal detailing the group's structure and nearly every member before succumbing to the poison.

When the Seanchan attack the White Tower, its fractured state prevents an effective defense. Many Aes Sedai are captured or killed until Egwene, leading a group of novices, succeeds in driving them off. Siuan Sanche, Gawyn Trakand, and Gareth Bryne mount a rescue of Egwene. They find her so exhausted that she cannot protest when they extract her against her orders. After awakening in the camp, she argues that they may have ruined her chances to gain credit in the Tower for the defeat of the Seanchan.

Egwene begins to expose the Black Ajah among the rebels, requiring every sister to re-swear her allegiances. Fifty sisters are exposed and executed, while twenty are able to escape. Taking advantage of the weakened White Tower defenses following the Seanchan raid, the rebels prepare an immediate attack. Just before the attack is mounted, the Tower Aes Sedai announce that Elaida was captured in the Seanchan raid, and that they would have Egwene as their leader, the Amyrlin Seat. The rebels return and they begin rebuilding the Tower.

== Writing ==
=== Jordan's illness and death (2005–2007) ===
"It seems to me that another part of doing honor to an author who is no longer with us is knowing when to write "The End" and cease the production of work in his world. It was abundantly clear to me that he wanted the series to be finished; if it had not been clear, I would never have undertaken this work."

— Harriet McDougal on continuing the series

Under the pen name Robert Jordan, James Oliver Rigney, Jr. began writing the intended final book, A Memory of Light, before the release of the previous book Knife of Dreams in 2005. Scheduled for publication by Tor Books in 2009, it was intended to conclude the series, which began in 1990 with The Eye of the World, originally intended as a series of four or five books. According to Forbes, Jordan had intended for it to be the final book "even if it reaches 2,000 pages." After Jordan fell fatally ill in December 2005 from a rare disease, cardiac amyloidosis, he still intended to finish at least A Memory of Light, and thus the main story arc, if the "worse comes to worst." Later he made preparations in case he was not able to finish the book. "I'm getting out notes, so if the worst actually happens, someone could finish A Memory of Light and have it end the way I want it to end." Shortly before his death, Jordan made a performance of the final book in a two and a half hour session to his wife and cousin, Wilson W. Grooms, Jr. Grooms stated in a later blog post "he became the Gleeman and told the bones of it ALL to Harriet and me!"

The book was not completed at the time of Jordan's death on September 16, 2007. His widow Harriet McDougal and his publisher, Tor Books president Tom Doherty made the decision to have the book completed posthumously, with McDougal saying, "I am sad to see the series end. But I would be far more distressed to leave it unfinished, incomplete and dangling forever."

On December 11, 2007, four months after Jordan's death, it was announced that McDougal had chosen Brandon Sanderson to finish the final book in the series, although the decision itself had been made the preceding month. Sanderson had been chosen partly because McDougal had read and liked his novels, and partly because of a eulogy he had written for Jordan. McDougal later expanded on her reasons, saying, "I do think [he] has a natural feeling for the ethical and moral issues of life."

=== Brandon Sanderson (2007–2009) ===
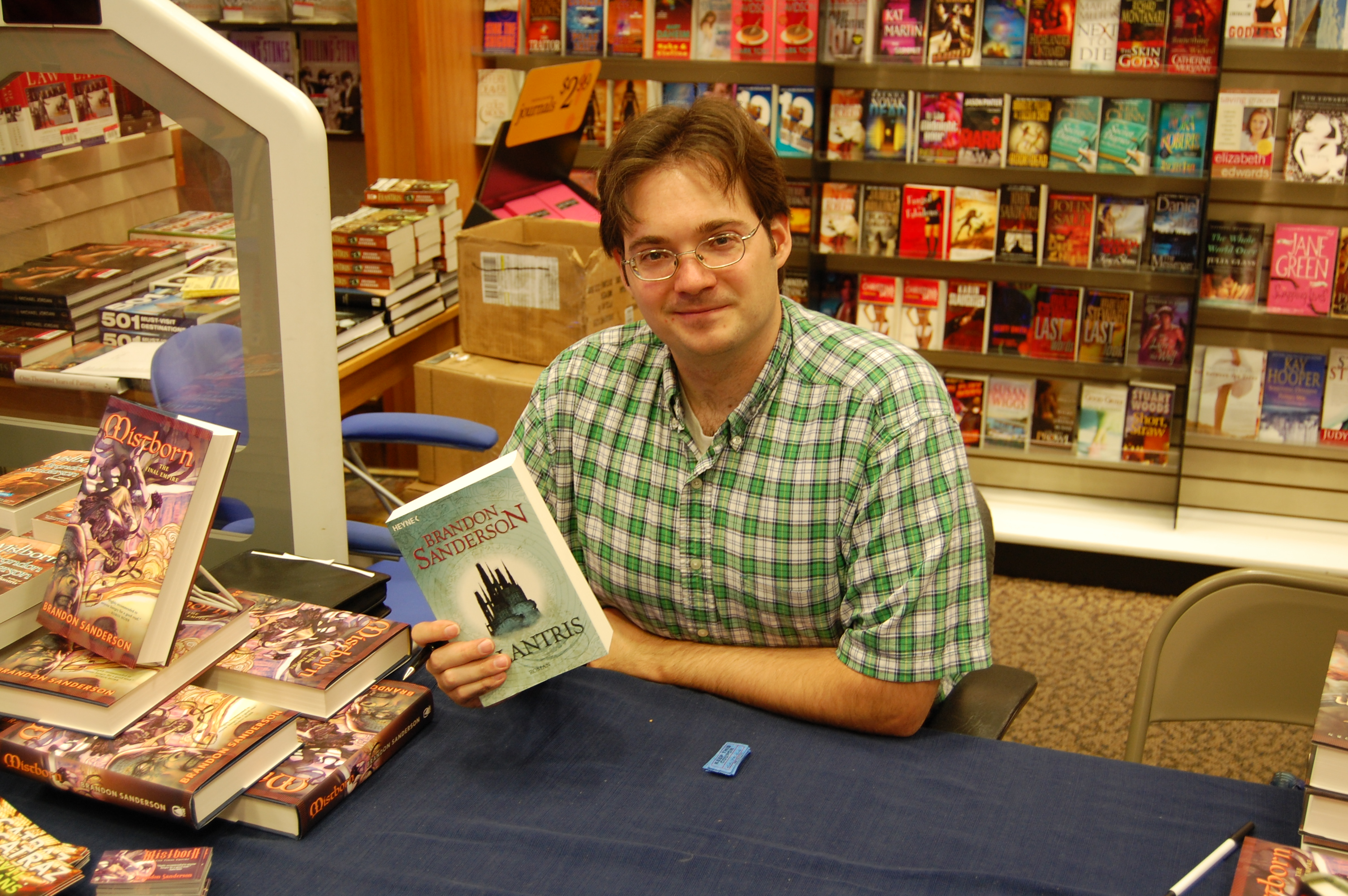
Brandon Sanderson was chosen to continue the book after Jordan's death

Brandon Sanderson was devastated by the news of Jordan's death; he had been a fan of the series since he was 15 years old and he cited Jordan as an inspiration. He was known for the novel Elantris and the Mistborn series at the time he was chosen. He did not want to imitate Jordan's style as he felt it would "turn into parody."

In an interview with Sci Fi Wire, Sanderson stated it was a great honor to be given the chance to complete the series but conceded he was unable to fill Jordan's shoes. Some parts of the book were nearly finished by Jordan, while others had only a couple of paragraphs to describe a twenty-page scene, but he described Jordan's notes as "amazing." He later elaborated that "the amount of material [Jordan] left behind is what makes this book possible." Speaking to The Guardian, he stated that although some people wouldn't like the book, and any failures would be blamed on him, "I say that I win because I get to be part of this." Through February 2008 Sanderson reread the entire series, posting his impressions of each book on his blog. The reread lasted until March 2008, at which point he "began to grasp the daunting nature of this book," with so many plot lines that needed to be resolved.

When writing the book Sanderson was assisted by Maria Simons, Jordan's assistant before his death and "right arm", and Alan Romanczuk, the series continuity manager, together known as "Team Jordan". Sanderson eventually dedicated the book to them, writing that "without [them] this book wouldn't have been possible."

Sanderson was originally working to a target of 200,000 words, later 250,000 words and by April 2008 up to 400,000 words. By the end of October 2008 the 400,000 estimate was still in effect. Sanderson later estimated the final length of A Memory of Light to be at least 750,000 words. Information emerged on the Internet pertaining to the book, with a draft cover suggesting it was to be split into multiple volumes. On March 30, 2009, Tor Books confirmed A Memory of Light was to be split into three volumes, and that the first volume, The Gathering Storm, would be released on November 3, 2009. However, this date was later changed to October 27, 2009, a week earlier than planned.

Although Jordan himself had promised only a single book, according to Sanderson neither Jordan's widow nor Doherty believed he could achieve this. Sanderson claimed that he could not do the story and characters justice with a single volume, so a split was inevitable. The decision was made to split the final book into three separate volumes, rather than two, so that a reasonably sized and unfractured volume could be released at the promised November 2009 date. Sanderson has stated that had the book remained as a single volume, it would not have been able to be released before November 2011, and likely would have been so large (around 2,000 pages) that it would be unpublishable.

On the split, Sanderson stated that without it he would have had to "railroad the story from climax to climax" and would sacrifice aspects even of major characters, eventually deciding that "The Wheel of Time deserved better."

The first volume was originally intended to be titled A Memory of Light: Gathering Clouds. The other volumes had working subtitles of Shifting Winds and Tarmon Gai'don for the second and third installments respectively. At the point the title A Memory of Light was dropped because book stores were worried it would be confusing, Sanderson decided the subtitle Gathering Clouds was "too generic, too basic" to be used as a title on its own. McDougal decided upon The Gathering Storm based on suggestions from Doherty. Sanderson states he considers the name to be "one of the more bland Wheel of Time titles."

=== Release (2009) ===
You may think of The Gathering Storm and its followers as the three volumes of A Memory of Light or as the final three books of The Wheel of Time. Both are correct.

— Sanderson in the foreword to The Gathering Storm.

Tor published several samples of The Gathering Storm leading up to its release. The first and second chapters were released for free on September 4 and 23. An e-book of the prologue, "What the Storm Means", was released for purchase on September 17, 2009. Before the release, the final titles of the last two books were also revealed to be Towers of Midnight and A Memory of Light for the 13th and 14th books respectively. Sanderson felt using the title A Memory of Light for the final book was "the best way to honor Mr. Jordan's wishes."

The Gathering Storm was released on October 27, 2009, with an initial print run of one million books. Sanderson supported the release with a 25 city book signing tour, with McDougal attending some events. The first event in the tour was a midnight release party in Provo, Utah with several hundred fans of the series attending. An unabridged audiobook was released, produced and read by Kate Reading and Michael Kramer, who have so far produced all the audiobooks for the series.

== Reception ==
The Gathering Storm, like the previous four books in the series, entered the top of The New York Times Best Seller list for hardcover fiction for the week of November 6, 2009; it ended Dan Brown's The Lost Symbol's seven-week reign. It dropped to the fourth position after one week. The book sold well in the United Kingdom; BookScan records 13,017 sold copies in the first week of sale.

Upon the release of the book, the reception was positive. It was agreed that, compared to other books in the series, the pace was faster. Many subplots were resolved, something Zack Handlen writing for The A.V. Club found satisfying, saying that the book had "a blessed willingness to tie up loose ends," something he felt Jordan had been unwilling to do. In a positive review, Seth Bracken of Deseret News explained that the pace is jarring but it also "creates a sense of urgency." Reviewers noted that Sanderson's style comes through in the novel. Handlen felt Sanderson's prose "lacks some of the descriptive punch" compared to Jordan's. Michael Mason-D'Croz writing for the Lincoln Journal Star went on to say Sanderson's "voice comes through in certain ways", describing the book as the "ultimate fan fiction."

In a review of the audio book, AudioFile magazine were positive, saying the narrators bring "intensity and passion" to the series. The audio book was also a finalist in AudioFile's The Audies 2010 awards in the sci-fi and fantasy category.

== Themes ==
There are several themes based on current world events and issues such as torture. Co-author Brandon Sanderson, who was chosen to complete the book partially because of his “natural feeling” for ethical and moral issues, has admitted in an interview with Wired that these were on his mind but he was not intentionally making a political allegory. Going on to say "fantasy is, at its very core, inherently representative." He also described laughter as a theme for the book, with the main character himself being unable to laugh, "We’ve got the terrible laughter and the full, joyful laughter, and poor Rand's silence in the middle."
