= A Voice in the Dark (song) =

Single by Blind Guardian

from the album At the Edge of Time
- Released: 25 June 2010 (Germany)
- Genre: Power metal, speed metal, thrash metal
- Length: 15:48
- Label: Nuclear Blast
- Songwriters: Hansi Kürsch, André Olbrich

Blind Guardian singles chronology
"Another Stranger Me" (2007)	"A Voice in the Dark" (2010)	"Twilight of the Gods" (2014)

"A Voice in the Dark" is a single by Blind Guardian from their ninth studio album, At the Edge of Time. It was released on 25 June 2010 in Germany and 6 July 2010 in North America.

== Reception ==
Metal Reviews wrote: "You get three very excellent and high quality Blind Guardian songs to tide you over until the new album comes out."

== Track listing ==
1. "A Voice in the Dark" – 5:45
2. "You're the Voice" – 4:43 (John Farnham Cover)
3. "War of the Thrones" (acoustic version) – 5:20

== Charts ==
Chart (2010)	Peak position
Germany (GfK)	62

== Personnel ==
- Hansi Kürsch - vocals
- André Olbrich - guitar
- Marcus Siepen - guitar
- Frederik Ehmke - drums
