= Windfinder =

Windfinder may refer to:

- Atha'an Miere, a fictional group of people in Robert Jordan's series of fantasy novels The Wheel of Time
- Windfinder.com, a worldwide weather service for windsurfers, kitesurfers, sailors and other water sports enthusiasts
