= EOTW =

EOTW or TEOTW may refer to:

- The Eye of the World (tEotW), a novel by Robert Jordan
- End of the world, survivalist terminology
