= Storm of War =

Terms such as storm(s) of war and the storm(s) of war have been used in multiple contexts throughout history:

- IL-2 Sturmovik: Cliffs of Dover, a video game initially known as Storm of War: Battle of Britain
- The Storm of War, a 2009 non-fiction book chronicling WWII
- Storms of War, a 2012 album by Swedish heavy metal band Katana

== See also ==
- "Hail, Columbia", a popular song prominently using the line
- "We shall fight on the beaches", an iconic speech prominently using the line
