= Knife of Dreams =

2005 novel by Robert Jordan

- Original cover of Knife of Dreams featuring Gaul, Perrin Aybara and Gerard Arganda facing down Aes Sedai Galina Casban, with maps of Malden's area on the table.
- Author: Robert Jordan
- Cover artist: Darrell K. Sweet
- Language: English
- Series: The Wheel of Time
- Genre: Fantasy
- Publisher: Tor Books (U.S.) & Orbit Books (UK)
- Publication date: October 11, 2005
- Publication place: United States
- Media type: Print (Hardback & Paperback)
- Pages: 784 (U.S. & UK hardback edition)
- ISBN: 0-312-87307-7 (U.S. hardback edition) & ISBN 1-84149-163-2 (UK hardback edition)
- OCLC: 60742113
- Dewey Decimal: 813/.54 22
- LC Class: PS3560.O7617 K58 2005
- Preceded by: Crossroads of Twilight
- Followed by: The Gathering Storm

Knife of Dreams is a fantasy novel by American author Robert Jordan, the eleventh book in his series The Wheel of Time. It was the last book which Jordan wrote completely before his death in 2007, with Brandon Sanderson finishing the series afterwards based on Jordan's notes. It was published by Tor Books in the U.S. and Orbit in the UK and released on October 11, 2005. Upon its release, it immediately rose to the #1 position on the New York Times hardcover fiction bestseller list, making it the fourth consecutive Wheel of Time book to reach the #1 position on that list. Knife of Dreams is 784-pages long, including a glossary. It has a prologue, 37 chapters, and an epilogue.

== Pre-publication information ==
The prologue to Knife of Dreams, entitled "Embers Falling on Dry Grass", was sold by the Scribner imprint of Simon & Schuster as an ebook on July 22, 2005, three months before the publication of the book itself.

Part of the prologue was first made available in the paperback edition of New Spring (released on June 13, 2005); upon the release of the full prologue as an eBook, this partial excerpt was made available online.

Additionally, a promotion at Amazon.com allowed those who preordered Knife of Dreams from August 10 to October 10, 2005 to immediately download at no additional cost the first chapter of the book, entitled "When Last Sounds".

== Plot summary ==
This volume of The Wheel of Time depicts several distinct plots. Unusual Trolloc attacks, the dead walking, ripples in the fabric of the world and other events seem to indicate that the Last Battle is drawing near; several characters using different evidence confidently state that Tarmon Gai'don is close at hand.

=== Prologue ===
- A confrontation between Galad Damodred, half-brother of Elayne Trakand and Gawyn Trakand on his father's side and of Rand al'Thor on his mother's side, and Eamon Valda, Lord Captain Commander of the Whitecloaks, which ends with Galad obtaining a Heron-mark sword and rank of the slain Lord Captain Commander.
- General Rodel Ituralde's campaign in Tarabon and Arad Doman against the Seanchan.
- the High Lady Suroth of the Seanchan is informed of the death of the Seanchan Empress, implicitly by the hand of the Forsaken Semirhage.
- Aes Sedai plots in the White Tower
- Perrin Aybara's meeting with Black Ajah Aes Sedai Galina Casban and his plan of attack on the Shaido Aiel
- the immediate aftermath of Egwene al'Vere's capture by Aes Sedai loyal to Elaida

=== Mat Cauthon ===
Mat travels into Altara, and Moiraine Damodred is located in the custody of the Aelfinn and Eelfinn. Attempting to escape Altara, Mat meets Talmanes, who has brought a large number of Mat's personal army (the Band of the Red Hand), which contends against a Seanchan force sent to kill Tuon, using fireworks as artillery. After a series of debates, Tuon marries Mat, giving him the Seanchan title 'Prince of the Ravens' ostensibly to assure a marriage of convenience. Thereafter, Tuon returns to Ebou Dar to destroy the treacherous High Lady Suroth and assume command proper of the Seanchan.

=== Rand al'Thor ===
Rand arranges a meeting with the Daughter of the Nine Moons to negotiate a truce; but a large-scale battle against a horde of 100,000 Trollocs and Myrdraal ends almost disastrously, when Lews Therin (Rand's alter-ego) seizes control of saidin. Thereafter, Rand forges a truce with Lews Therin. The meeting with Tuon comes to a grisly end upon Rand and crew discovering Semirhage, disguised, in her place. In the ensuing battle, Semirhage is captured at the cost of Rand's own left hand and reveals that his mental disorder, which allows him to communicate with his past self, is almost universally fatal.

=== Perrin Aybara ===
Perrin disperses the Shaido threat and rescues his wife Faile using an alliance with Seanchan Banner-General Tylee Khirgan. To overcome the large number of Shaido Wise Ones, they lace the Shaido water supply with Forkroot herbs, which impedes channeling the One Power. Rand's adoptive father Tam arrives with reinforcements from the Two Rivers. In the course of the battle, Perrin's protege Aram dies while attempting to kill him. In the rescue of Faile, the Aiel Rolan is killed by Perrin, although he and other Aiel had helped Faile and her friends during captivity, unknown to Perrin. Sevanna is captured and the Shaido, defeated and disgraced, are led by Therava back to the Aiel Waste, with the Black Sister Galina Casban in tow.

=== White Tower Siege ===
Egwene is captive in the White Tower, but keeps in contact with the rebel Aes Sedai through Tel'aran'rhiod. Despite harsh disciplining, she spreads rumors and doubt in the White Tower about Elaida's suitability as Amyrlin. Both the rebels and the White Tower send Aes Sedai to the Black Tower to bond Asha'man, with the rebels doing so after Rand offered to counter the number of loyalist Aes Sedai bonded to Asha'man.

=== Others ===
Loial is married and speaks to the Ogier of his stedding (which is the name given to areas that Ogier call home, like a village) that they must assist the human armies. Then, Loial and his mentor Elder Haman wield axes during the Trolloc attack. Lan Mandragoran rides to Shienar to fight; but Nynaeve al'Meara takes him to the coast of the Aryth Ocean at World's End in Saldaea; from there, she goes herself to recruit Lan's scattered countrymen.

Galad Damodred kills Eamon Valda for allegedly killing Queen Morgase of Andor and becomes the leader of the Whitecloaks, and then, in his capacity as their leader, he determines to fight alongside Rand's followers. Elayne Trakand becomes Queen of Andor. Mazrim Taim meets with a group of Red Ajah from the White Tower and agrees to their proposition: since Sisters were taken and bonded against their will by certain Asha'man, an equivalent number of Black Tower initiates should be bonded by sisters.

== Release details ==
- 2005, U.S., Tor Books ISBN 0-312-87307-7, Pub date 11 October 2005, hardback (First edition)
- 2005, UK, Orbit ISBN 1-84149-163-2, Pub date 11 October 2005, hardback
- 2005, UK, Orbit ISBN 1-84149-228-0, Pub date 5 October 2006, paperback
