= Khatanga =

Khatanga may refer to:

- Khatanga, Russia, a rural locality (a selo) in Krasnoyarsk Krai, Russia
- Khatanga Airport, an airport in Krasnoyarsk Krai
- Khatanga (river), a river in Krasnoyarsk Krai, Russia
- Khatanga Gulf, a gulf at the Taymyr Peninsula
- Khatanga, West Bengal, a gram panchayat in West Bengal, India

== See also ==
- Katanga (disambiguation)
