= The Wheel of Time =

Series of fantasy novels by Robert Jordan

- Cover of The Eye of the World (1990)
- Created by: Robert Jordan
- Original work: The Eye of the World (1990)
- Owner: Tor Books (Macmillan)
- Years: 1990–present

Print publications
- Books: The World of Robert Jordan's The Wheel of Time (1997); The Wheel of Time Companion (2015); Origins of The Wheel of Time (2022)
- Novels: The Eye of the World (1990); The Great Hunt (1990); The Dragon Reborn (1991); The Shadow Rising (1992); The Fires of Heaven (1993); Lord of Chaos (1994); A Crown of Swords (1996); The Path of Daggers (1998); Winter's Heart (2000); Crossroads of Twilight (2003); New Spring (2004); Knife of Dreams (2005); The Gathering Storm (2009); Towers of Midnight (2010); A Memory of Light (2013)
- Short stories: "The Strike at Shayol Ghul" (1996); "New Spring" (1998); "River of Souls" (2013); "A Fire Within the Ways" (2019)
- Comics: New Spring (2005, 2009–2010); The Eye of the World (2010–2013); The Great Hunt (2023–present)

Films and television
- Television series: The Wheel of Time (2021–2025)

Games
- Traditional: The Wheel of Time Collectible Card Game (1999)
- Role-playing: The Wheel of Time Roleplaying Game (2001)
- Video game: The Wheel of Time (1999)

Audio
- Soundtrack: A Soundtrack for the Wheel of Time (1999)

The Wheel of Time is a series of high fantasy novels by the American author Robert Jordan, with Brandon Sanderson as co-author of the final three books. Originally planned as a trilogy, the series, which began with The Eye of the World (1990), came to span 14 volumes, in addition to a prequel novel and three companion books. Jordan died in 2007 while working on what was planned to be the twelfth and final volume in the series. He prepared extensive notes, enabling Sanderson to complete the final book, which grew into three volumes: The Gathering Storm (2009), Towers of Midnight (2010), and A Memory of Light (2013).

The series draws on numerous elements of both European and Asian mythologies, most notably the cyclical nature of time found in Buddhism and Hinduism; the metaphysical concepts of balance, duality and a respect for nature found in Taoism; the dualistic concepts of God and Satan which is the foundation of Zoroastrianism; and the concepts of Watchers from Judaism.

The Wheel of Time is known for its length, detailed imaginary world, magic system, and large cast of characters. The eighth through fourteenth books each reached number one on the New York Times Best Seller list. After its completion, the series was nominated for a Hugo Award for Best Novel. As of 2021, the series has sold over 90 million copies worldwide, making it one of the best-selling epic fantasy series since The Lord of the Rings. Its popularity has spawned comic book adaptations, a collectible card game, a video game, a roleplaying game, and a soundtrack album. A television adaptation, The Wheel of Time, aired for three seasons on Amazon Prime Video, from 2021 to 2025.

== Setting ==
=== The One Power and the Aes Sedai ===
The series is set in the Third Age of a fantasy world in which the pattern of human existence is determined and maintained by the Wheel of Time, a cosmic embodiment of eternal return. The Wheel spins the Pattern of the Ages, manifest in both the physical world and human destiny, using the lives of men and women as its threads. Individuals with the power to influence and change the Pattern are called ta'veren. The Wheel is rotated by a magical force called the One Power. The ability to access and wield the One Power is known as channeling, and only women can do this safely. Artifacts called angreal amplify the One Power, with sa'angreal being the most potent, and ter'angreal limited to specific functions.

A matriarchal order called the Aes Sedai, made up of female channelers, are both respected and feared across the world. Their stated goal is to use their skills to serve and protect humanity, but they are also preparing for the inevitable, prophesized return of a malevolent entity they call the Dark One. The leader of the Aes Sedai, known as the Amyrlin Seat, rules from the White Tower in the city of Tar Valon. The order is divided into seven disciplines, or Ajahs: the Blue Ajah are dedicated to the pursuit of justice and inevitably intrigue, possessing extensive spy networks; the Brown Ajah are dedicated to the preservation of knowledge and history; the Gray Ajah are dedicated to mediation and politics; the Green Ajah are warriors trained in battle and strategy; the Red Ajah monitor the use of the One Power by outsiders; the White Ajah are concerned with logic and truth; the Yellow Ajah are mistresses of healing; and a secret eighth faction, the Black Ajah, pose as members of other Ajahs but serve the Dark One. The few men born with the ability to channel ultimately go mad, so the Red Ajah hunt male channelers and "gentle" them, or cut them off permanently from the One Power, ever aware of the danger they represent. With the exception of the Red Ajah, an Aes Sedai may choose to bond magically with a Warder, a male protector. The link bestows the Warder with heightened senses, strength, stamina and resistance to injury.

=== Geography and cultures ===
The primary continent depicted in the series consists of three regions: the Westlands, Shara far to the east, and the Aiel Waste in between. The Aiel Waste is separated from the Westlands by a vast mountain range known as the Spine of the World. Connecting these three areas in the north is the eastern part of the Great Blight, a once-verdant land mass that has been corrupted by the Dark One's influence. It stretches far west across the Aryth Ocean and borders the north of the continent of Seanchan. South of the Westlands is the Sea of Storms, and the small continent known as the Land of the Madmen. The Westlands contain 14 nations, including Andor, Cairhien, Illian, Shienar and Tear, as well as four major city-states: Falme, Far Madding, Mayene and Tar Valon. Other notable cities include Caemlyn, the capital of Andor, and Fal Dara, the northernmost city in Shienar. Two Rivers is a region in Andor which includes the village Emond's Field, home of five of the series' main characters. Shara, which extends much further south than either the Westlands or the Aiel Waste, is separated from the rest of the continent by the Cliffs of the Dawn and the Great Rift. Shara remains mysterious to outsiders, who are only allowed to enter walled-off towns to trade. The world in which the series is set is sometimes called "Randland" by fans, referring to lead character Rand al'Thor.

Map of the fictional world of The Wheel of Time

The Seanchan are a vast and powerful empire whose civilization has developed at a distance from the primary continent of the series. Their culture enslaves female channelers, who they believe are too dangerous to be free. Such channelers, known as damane, are collared with a ter'angreal called an a'dam, which allows women known as sul'dam to harness and control their channeling power. As the Seanchan invade, they use the a'dam to enslave any Aes Sedai they can. Also opposing the Aes Sedai are the Children of the Light, or Whitecloaks, a quasi-religious, militarized order bent on destroying anyone who channels the One Power, believing they are servants of the Shadow. In Shara, channelers are known as Ayyad, and isolate themselves in special communities. The females, who secretly control the monarchy, cultivate a bloodline of channelers by using male Ayyad as uneducated breeding stock and executing them by age 21.

The Aiel are a fierce warrior race who live in the Three-fold Land, called the Aiel Waste by outsiders, an inhospitable desert region located between the Westlands and Shara. They are tall, with characteristic pale eyes, and red or blond hair. There are 12 Aiel clans, plus the extinct Jenn Aiel, who built the city of Rhuidean, a repository of Aiel history and culture. The Maidens of the Spear are an all-female warrior society among the Aiel. Female Aiel who can channel the One Power or navigate Tel'aran'rhiod, the World of Dreams, do not join the Aes Sedai, instead becoming known as Wise Ones. The Aiel await a prophesied "Chief of Chiefs", whom they call the Car'a'carn, who will unite and rule all the clans.

The Ogier are a hirsute, wide-featured and immensely tall and strong species of humanoid known for their proficiency in woodwork and masonry. Though physically intimidating, they are peaceful, intelligent and interested in historical and genealogical study. The Ogier also possess a unique ability called treesinging, whereby they stimulate the growth and healing of trees and plants by singing to them. They live in sanctuaries called steddings, in which the One Power is inaccessible. After the Breaking of the World, male channelers who sought sanctuary with the Ogier thanked them by creating the Ways, a series of paths through an alternate dimension that connected Ogier communities. Stone doorways called Waygates, placed outside each stedding, were used to travel long distances quickly. In the millennia that followed, however, the Ways were corrupted by a malevolent force known as the Machin Shin, or Black Wind, which attacks travelers.

The Tinkers, or Tuatha'an, are a nomadic group of people who travel continuously and widely in brightly colored wagons, believing this is the only way to remain safe. They follow the pacifistic Way of the Leaf, which eschews violence. The Tuatha'an's main purpose has evolved to searching for "The Song", lost during the Breaking of the World, which they claim they will know when they find it. Once part of the Aiel tribe, they broke off due to their pacifistic beliefs. The Sea Folk, or Atha'an Miere, are dark-skinned people with complex customs who live on ships and on islands in the Sea of Storms. They only appear on the mainland to trade goods, and Sea Folk porcelain sculptures, delicate and graceful objects of art, are highly prized by mainlanders. Unknown to any but the Atha'an Miere, the fabled porcelain is created by the Amayar, a group of island dwelling people protected by the Sea Folk as a solemn duty since the Breaking of the World. The Amayar adhere to the Water Way, a pacifistic way of life akin to the Way of the Leaf practiced by the Tuatha'an.

=== The Dark One ===
Humans seduced by promises of power and immortality to serve the Dark One are known as Darkfriends. The increasing influence of the Dark One has also introduced an array of creatures called Shadowspawn. Trollocs are brutal, humanoid monsters with animal senses who kill with pleasure and eat all meat, including humans. They are led by the Myrddraal, or Fades, terrifying and deadly creatures without eyes who can disappear in shadow but will not cross running water. Appearing human and designed to target channelers, gholam are constructs which possess superhuman strength, are impervious to harm and immune to the One Power, and feed on blood. Gray Men, or the Soulless, are humans who have sacrificed their souls to become drab assassins with the ability to pass completely unnoticed. Draghkar are flying, vampiric creatures that devour the souls of their prey. Darkhounds are otherworldly, doglike beasts the size of small horses, with acidic, poison saliva. They regenerate when wounded or dismembered, and can only be destroyed by balefire, a weapon of the One Power which erases the target from existence, retroactively through time.

The most significant minions of the Shadow are the Forsaken, a group of male and female channelers from the Second Age, or the Age of Legends, who are among the most powerful to have ever lived. Calling themselves "Those Chosen to Rule the World Forever", they pledged their loyalty to the Dark One in exchange for power and immortality. In turn, the Dark One granted them access to the True Power, his exclusive equivalent of the One Power which is not divided by gender, and is more chaotic. Use of the True Power manifests as saa, black flecks moving across the eyes of the channeler, increasing in number in tandem with increased channeling. The more powerful among the Forsaken vie to be raised above the others to the position of nae'blis, the Dark One's second-in-command. The thirteen Forsaken—Aginor, Asmodean, Balthamel, Be'lal, Demandred, Graendal, Ishamael, Lanfear, Mesaana, Moghedien, Rahvin, Sammael and Semirhage—were imprisoned with the Dark One at Shayol Ghul at the end of the Second Age. Three thousand years later near the end of the Third Age, the Aes Sedai learn that the prophesied channeler known as the Dragon has been reborn, signaling that a final battle with the Dark One is coming. The Seven Seals of the Dark One's prison have weakened, and the Forsaken begin to reenter the world, presenting a new threat and paving the way for their master.

=== Backstory ===
In the backstory of the series, the Wheel of Time and the universe were forged at the dawn of time by a deity known as the Creator, simultaneously imprisoning its antithesis, the Dark One. The One Power itself is divided into both male (saidin) and female (saidar) halves, and originally both genders could wield it. In the Age of Legends, the Aes Sedai was made up of both men and women who could channel. An Aes Sedai experiment inadvertently drilled what would become known as the Bore into the Dark One's prison, and his influence began to seep out into the world. In response to the threat of his eventual release, the Wheel produced the Dragon, Lews Therin Telamon, a channeler of immense power. Lews eventually rose to command the Aes Sedai and their allies in the struggle against the Dark One's forces. Seven Seals were created, made of an unbreakable substance called cuendillar, to be used as focus points to reseal the Dark One's prison for good. Lews and a host of 113 male channelers managed to imprison the Forsaken with their master, but at the moment of victory, the Dark One was able to taint saidin, driving male channelers insane. Lews killed his friends and family, and then himself. Other male channelers devastated the world with earthquakes and tidal waves, an event called the Breaking of the World, before destroying themselves. The female Aes Sedai guided humanity out of this dark time, living in the shadow of a prophecy that the Dark One would break free from his prison and the Dragon would be reborn to fight him once more. And though the Dragon Reborn is humanity's only hope against the Dark One, he would break the world a second time in the process.

== Plot ==
In The Eye of the World (1990), the arrival of a mysterious noblewoman to the remote village of Emond's Field in the Two Rivers precedes an attack on the town by a force of humanoid monsters called Trollocs. The woman reveals herself to be Moiraine Damodred, one of the Aes Sedai, and warns that the servants of the Dark One are seeking one of three young men from the village: Rand al'Thor, Perrin Aybara and Matrim Cauthon. They leave with Moiraine and her companion, the Warder Lan Mandragoran, and are joined by Egwene al'Vere, in whom Moiraine sees a potential Aes Sedai; the gleeman Thom Merrilin; and later the Wisdom Nynaeve al'Meara, a healer who learns she can also channel the One Power. They are pursued by increasing numbers of Trollocs, led by deadly, eyeless Fades, and are separated fleeing the cursed, abandoned city of Shadar Logoth. At the Eye of the World, a sacred pool of untainted saidin, Rand's defeat of the Forsaken Aginor and Ba'alzamon convinces Moiraine that he is the prophesied Dragon Reborn.

From then, the story expands and protagonist Rand, as well as the other characters, are frequently split into different groups, pursuing different missions or agendas aimed at furthering the cause of the Dragon Reborn, sometimes thousands of miles apart. Broadly speaking, the original group of characters from the Two Rivers make new allies, gain experience, and become figures of some influence and authority. As they struggle to unite the western kingdoms against the Dark One's forces, their task is complicated by rulers of the nations who refuse to give up their authority and by factions such as the Children of the Light, who do not believe in the prophecies, and the Seanchan, the people of a long-lost colony of Artur Hawkwing's empire across the western ocean who have returned, believing it is their destiny to conquer the world. The Aes Sedai also become divided between those who believe the Dragon Reborn should be strictly controlled and those who believe he must lead them into battle as he did in the earlier war. As the story expands, new characters representing different factions are introduced; although this expansion of the narrative allows the sheer scale of the growing struggle to be effectively depicted, it has been criticized for slowing the pace of the novels and sometimes reducing the appearances of the original or main cast to extended cameos.

By the sixth novel, Lord of Chaos (1994), it has become clear that the Last Battle, triggered when the Dark One is able to exert its influence directly on the world once more, is imminent, as only three Seals (keys to the Dark One's prison) are intact. Once the remaining Seals break, the Dark One will be free to touch the world. The Last Battle, Tarmon Gai'don, is depicted in the fourteenth and final novel in the series, A Memory of Light (2013).

== Novels ==
No.	Title	Author(s)	Release date	Pages (1st edition)	Word count	Audio length	ISBN
1	The Eye of the World	Robert Jordan	15 January 1990	688	310,874	29h 57m	978-0-312-85009-8
2	The Great Hunt	Robert Jordan	15 November 1990	624	258,203	26h 34m	978-0-312-85140-8
3	The Dragon Reborn	Robert Jordan	15 October 1991	624	242,016	24h 48m	978-0-312-85248-1
4	The Shadow Rising	Robert Jordan	15 September 1992	704	341,730	41h 13m	978-0-312-85431-7
5	The Fires of Heaven	Robert Jordan	15 October 1993	704	342,005	36h 27m	978-0-312-85427-0
6	Lord of Chaos	Robert Jordan	15 October 1994	720	391,159	41h 32m	978-0-312-85428-7
7	A Crown of Swords	Robert Jordan	15 May 1996	720	285,958	30h 24m	978-0-312-85767-7
8	The Path of Daggers	Robert Jordan	20 October 1998	528	222,185	23h 25m	978-0-312-85769-1
9	Winter's Heart	Robert Jordan	7 November 2000	625	238,423	24h 12m	978-0-312-86425-5
10	Crossroads of Twilight	Robert Jordan	7 January 2003	624	264,200	26h 04m	978-0-312-86459-0
0	New Spring	Robert Jordan	6 January 2004	336	121,816	12h 38m	978-0-7653-0629-6
11	Knife of Dreams	Robert Jordan	11 October 2005	783	313,674	32h 19m	978-0-312-87307-3
12	The Gathering Storm	Robert Jordan and Brandon Sanderson	27 October 2009	784	294,492	32h 58m	978-0-7653-0230-4
13	Towers of Midnight	Robert Jordan and Brandon Sanderson	2 November 2010	861	325,636	38h 23m	978-0-7653-2594-5
14	A Memory of Light	Robert Jordan and Brandon Sanderson	8 January 2013	912	352,686	41h 47m	978-0-7653-2595-2

In 2002, The Eye of the World was repackaged as two volumes with new illustrations for younger readers: From the Two Rivers, including an extra chapter (Ravens) before the existing prologue; and To the Blight with an expanded glossary. In 2004, the same was done with The Great Hunt, with the two parts being The Hunt Begins and New Threads in the Pattern.

== Development ==
=== Writing and conception ===
Jordan started writing The Eye of the World in 1984 and did not finish it until late 1988 or early 1989, with characters and storylines changing considerably during the writing process. One early version of the story centered on an older man who discovered relatively late in life that he was the 'chosen one' who had to save the world. However, Jordan deliberately decided to move closer to the tone and style of J. R. R. Tolkien's The Fellowship of the Ring and made the characters younger and less experienced. Once this decision had been made, writing proceeded much more easily and Jordan completed the second volume, The Great Hunt, at roughly the same time the first book was published. According to fantasy author Brandon Sanderson, Jordan originally planned the series as a trilogy.

Jordan wrote full-time at breakneck speed for the next several years until he completed the seventh volume, A Crown of Swords, at which point he slowed down, delivering a book every two years. Fans objected when he took some time off to expand a short story into a prequel novel called New Spring, so he decided to shelve his plans for additional prequels in favor of finishing off the last two volumes in the series. He rejected criticisms of the later volumes of the series slowing down in pace in order to concentrate on minor secondary characters at the expense of the main characters from the opening volumes but acknowledged that his structure for the tenth volume, Crossroads of Twilight (where he showed a major scene from the prior book, Winter's Heart, from the perspective of the main characters that were not involved in the scene), had not worked out as he had planned. Knife of Dreams, the eleventh volume, had a much more positive reception from critics and fans alike and Jordan announced the twelfth volume, which he had previously announced would have the working title A Memory of Light, would conclude the series. According to Forbes, Jordan had intended for it to be the final book "even if it reaches 2,000 pages."

=== Jordan's death and completion by Sanderson ===
Jordan was diagnosed with the terminal heart disease primary amyloidosis with cardiomyopathy in December 2005, and while he intended to finish at least A Memory of Light even if the "worse comes to worst", he made preparations in case he was not able to complete the book: "I'm getting out notes, so if the worst actually happens, someone could finish A Memory of Light and have it end the way I want it to end."

With Jordan's death on 16 September 2007, the conclusion of the series was in question. On 7 December of that year, the publisher Tor Books announced that Sanderson was to finish A Memory of Light. Sanderson, a longtime fan of the series, was chosen by Jordan's widow Harriet McDougal partly because she liked Sanderson's novels and partly because of a eulogy he had written for Jordan. Jordan had prepared extensive notes, which enabled Sanderson to complete the final book.

On 30 March 2009, Tor Books announced that A Memory of Light would be split into three volumes, with Brandon Sanderson citing timing and continuity reasons. By his estimate in early 2009, the book would have taken several years to write and would have reached 800,000 words. McDougal doubted that Jordan could have concluded it in a single volume. The three volumes were published from 2009 to 2013, as The Gathering Storm, Towers of Midnight, and A Memory of Light, with the last book using Jordan's title.

=== After A Memory of Light ===
Prior to his death, Jordan had often discussed adding an additional two prequels and an 'outrigger' sequel trilogy. In a Q&A following the release of A Memory of Light, Sanderson ruled out the completion of these works; Jordan had left very little in the way of notes for these additional novels – only two sentences in the case of the sequel trilogy. Sanderson addressed the subject again in a 2023 blog post, and stated that writing additional Wheel of Time works would have gone against the wishes of Robert Jordan.

Two cut portions of A Memory of Light were released as short stories in the years following the release of the main book. These were published in Unfettered anthologies, part of a charitable endeavour to support authors and artists with medical debt. River of Souls, a canonical segment removed from the published book due to pacing, was released in the first volume in 2013. A Fire in the Ways, a non-canon alternate sequence of events around the climax of the final book, was included in the third volume in 2019. A glossary to the series, The Wheel of Time Companion, was released in 2015.

== Themes and influences ==
The Wheel of Time is a mix of modern and classic fantasy genre, specifically high fantasy. The book is set in a world that is simultaneously the distant past and distant future of the real world, as a result of time being cyclical rather than linear. The opening of the first book establishes the concept:

The Wheel of Time turns, and Ages come and pass, leaving memories that become legend. Legend fades to myth, and even myth is long forgotten when the Age that gave it birth comes again. In one Age, called the Third Age by some, an Age yet to come, an Age long past, a wind rose...

Jordan acknowledged the influence of J. R. R. Tolkien, including deliberately modelling the setting of the first chapters on the Shire in The Lord of the Rings. Concepts drawn from monotheistic religions include the duality between good and evil and between "Creator" (Light) and Shai'tan, "The Dark One" (Shaitan is an Arabic word that, in Islamic contexts, is used as a name for the Devil or Satan). Other influences include Arthurian legends, Norse mythology and Irish mythology, as well as real life history. In addition, Jordan also drew influences from Eastern mythology, which was rare for a Western fantasy series. The concept of a wheel of time was drawn from Hinduism. Versions of the concept include the Yuga cycle in Hinduism and Kalachakra in Buddhism. The series was also influenced by the concepts of reincarnation and balance, and the symbol of the Aes Sedai resembles the yin and yang. The series also draws inspiration from Leo Tolstoy's War and Peace.

Fate is an important theme to the series. The series explores in great detail the implications of a common fantasy premise, in which an ordinary boy on the verge of adulthood discovers he is fated to lead a major struggle. It also deals with the divide between fate and free will. Some major characters are ta'veren, who have exceptional abilities to influence the course of history in a tumultuous period, but even they can only go so far as permitted by "The Pattern" that is being set by the Wheel of Time.

The series also featured alternative portrayals of the role of gender in society. The nature of magic in its world means that only women can safely use it. This disparity influences the power dynamics at multiple levels of its societies, including familial, communal and political levels; many of its societies are ruled by women.

== Derivative works ==
=== Short stories ===
Jordan wrote two short stories within the franchise in the late 1990s. The first, "The Strike at Shayol Ghul", predates the main series by several thousand years. It was made available on the Internet and was later published in The World of Robert Jordan's The Wheel of Time. Jordan also wrote a short story entitled "New Spring", for the 1998 anthology Legends edited by Robert Silverberg. Jordan later expanded this into the stand-alone novel New Spring that was published in January 2004.

During Brandon Sanderson's work on A Memory of Light, two sections of the book were cut and later published as short stories in anthologies. The first, "River of Souls", was published in Unfettered: Tales by Masters of Fantasy (2013). The second, "A Fire Within the Ways" was published in Unfettered III in 2019. Unlike "River of Souls", "A Fire Within the Ways" is not considered canon.

=== Companion books ===
In November 1997, Tor Books published a companion book to the series, entitled The World of Robert Jordan's The Wheel of Time, which contains much hitherto unrevealed background information about the series including the first maps of the entire world and the Seanchan home continent. Jordan co-authored the book with Teresa Patterson. Jordan ruled the book broadly canonical but stated that it was written from the perspective of an historian within The Wheel of Time universe and was prone to errors of bias and guesswork.

On November 3, 2015, Tor published The Wheel of Time Companion: The People, Places, and History of the Bestselling Series was released in hardback format, written by Harriet McDougal, Alan Romanczuk, and Maria Simons. Alan Romanczuk and Maria Simons were Robert Jordan's editorial assistants. The book is an encapsulating glossary of the entire series. The authors began compiling material for the volume as early as 2005, and the final book was released after the series' conclusion.

On November 8, 2022, Tor published Origins of the Wheel of Time: The Legends and Mythologies that Inspired Robert Jordan, written by Michael Livingston. The book contains a brief biography of Robert Jordan and gives an account of how he came to write The Wheel of Time. It analyzes Jordan's influences, and how the real world and works of literature influenced or were referenced by the novels. In particular, it outlines the influences of Le Morte d'Arthur by Sir Thomas Malory, J. R. R. Tolkien's Legendarium, and The White Goddess by Robert Graves. One section lists various references to the real world contained within The Wheel of Time, both confirmed and speculated. The book also contains a foreword written by Harriet McDougal Rigney (Jordan's widow and editor), a few excerpts from early drafts of the texts, a deleted scene from The Eye of the World, and a revised map of the world based on Jordan's feedback on the map included in The World of Robert Jordan's The Wheel of Time. Many references are given linking assertions in the book to the collection of Jordan's personal notes contained at The Citadel in Charleston, South Carolina.

=== Comic books ===
The Wheel of Time comics
Book	Issues	Debut	Conclusion
New Spring	8	July 2005	June 2010
The Eye of the World	35	March 2009	March 2013
The Great Hunt	TBA	November 2023	

In 2004, Jordan sold the comic rights among others to Red Eagle Entertainment. Dabel Brothers began adapting the series in July 2005 starting with the prequel New Spring. The series initially ran on a monthly schedule, but then went on a three-year hiatus after the fifth issue. Red Eagle cited delays and changes to the creative team on the DB Pro end. The final three issues were ultimately completed and published in 2009–10. These ran concurrently with Dynamite Entertainment's The Eye of the World, which ran for a total of 35 issues between then and March 2013. The 43 New Spring and Eye of the World comics were later collected together and released as a series of six graphic novels, the last of which was released in February 2015.

When asked in a 2013 interview about whether the comics would continue their run, Harriet McDougal replied "Well, eventually, [we'll] do the whole thing, unless it stops selling in a dreadful way. In other words, I don't really know." The series would be inactive for a decade, but returned amid the wave of interest in the franchise during the run of the television series. An adaptation of The Great Hunt began serialisation in November 2023. A second volume of Great Hunt comics (issues #7-12) is earmarked for October 2027.

=== Games ===
There is a Wheel of Time MUD, identified as such or by the initialism WoTMUD, which is based on a world like that of the Wheel of Time but set in a time frame around 30 world years prior. It has been in operation almost continuously since 1993. Notably, the WoTMUD had gained written permission from the author to use his creation including all but major characters.

A computer game named The Wheel of Time was released in 1999. Over the course of the game, Aes Sedai must track down a robber following an assault on the White Tower, and prevent the Dark One from being released prematurely. She eventually learns of and executes a long-forgotten ritual at Shayol Ghul to ensure the Dark Lord remains sealed within the prison. While Jordan was consulted in the creation of the game, he did not write the storyline himself.

Starting in 1999, Precedence Entertainment released three sets of The Wheel of Time Collectible Card Game.

The Wheel of Time Roleplaying Game was released in 2001 from Wizards of the Coast using the d20 rules developed for the third edition of the Dungeons & Dragons game. The game had a single adventure module published in 2002, Prophecies of the Dragon. Shortly after the release of the adventure book Wizards of the Coast announced they would not be releasing any further products for the game. Robert Jordan cited some problems with the roleplaying game, such as storyline details in the adventure module that contradicted the books.

In early 2009 EA Games announced that they had bought the rights for a MMORPG, with the plan to publish it through the EA Partners-Program. The following year Obsidian Entertainment announced that they would be working on the project, for a PlayStation 3, Xbox 360, and PC release. However, the project was seemingly dropped around 2014.

In April 2025, iwot Studios (formerly Red Eagle Entertainment) announced an open-world action RPG in development for PC and consoles. The Montreal-based studio is led by Craig Alexander, former vice president at Warner Bros. Games, with a projected three-year development cycle.

=== Music ===
In 1999, A Soundtrack for the Wheel of Time was released, featuring music by Robert Berry and inspired by the books.

The German power metal band Blind Guardian have written two songs dedicated to the Wheel of Time series as part of their 2010 album At the Edge of Time: "Ride into Obsession" and "Wheel of Time". Swedish heavy metal band Katana also wrote a song, entitled "The Wisdom of Emond's Field", on their 2012 album Storms of War. The American power metal band Noble Beast, on their 2014 album of the same name, wrote a song entitled "The Dragon Reborn", in reference to Rand al'Thor. The American black metal band Shaidar Logoth takes its name from an adaptation of the city of Shadar Logoth, and lyrically expands on the character Padan Fain. The Austrian metal band Dragony, on their 2018 album "Masters of the Multiverse", released the song "Flame of Tar Valon", referencing the Amyrlin Seat. The Swedish metal band Freternia, on their 2019 album "The Gathering", released the song "Reborn", referencing the Dragon Reborn, Rand al'Thor. The American band Lyra wrote the song "The Sword That Could Not Be Broken", about the history of Manetheren, as well as the song "Betrayer of Hope", in reference to Ishamael. The Dread Crew of Oddwood produced the song "The Gleeman", which refers to Thom's battle with a Myrddraal in Whitebridge. The Scottish metal band Farseer, on their 2016 album "Fall Before the Dawn", released the song "Luck of the Joker", which references the most important events that happen to Matrim Cauthon during the whole series. The Swedish band Withered Beauty, on their self-titled album, released the song "He Who Comes with the Dawn" in reference to the Dragon. The name of the American Black Metal band Horn of Valere is also a direct reference to an artifact from the series. The Spanish power metal band Reveal, on their 2023 album "Still Alive", released the song "Dragon Reborn", referencing Rand al'Thor.. The power metal band Eons Enthroned, on their 2021 album "Into the Arcane", have several songs referencing many different fantasy stories, including "To Sheathe the Blade" in reference to Lan Mandragoran during the Last Battle; "Veins of Gold" in reference to the chapter of the same name, with Rand struggling with Saidin, and "Twisted Red Doorframe", referencing the ter'angreal with the title ..

In the tradition of the literature-inspired symphonic poem, American composer Seth Stewart produced a full-scale orchestral work entitled "Age of Legends", inspired by the eponymous era of myth and magic described throughout the Wheel of Time series. The orchestral piece was premiered and recorded in 2011 at the Beall Concert Hall.

=== Television and film ===
==== Early attempts ====
In a 2000 chat on CNN.com, Robert Jordan mentioned that NBC had purchased an option to do a miniseries of The Eye of the World. But he expressed doubts that the series would be made stating "key people involved in getting that contract together have left NBC." The series was optioned by Universal Pictures in 2008 for film adaptations, with plans to adapt The Eye of the World as the first film. Neither project ultimately emerged.

In February 2015, Red Eagle Entertainment paid air time to cable network FXX to air Winter Dragon, a low-budget 22-minute pilot for a potential The Wheel of Time series that allowed Red Eagle to hold on to the rights to the series. The pilot, based on the prologue to The Eye of the World, starred Max Ryan as Lews Therin Thelamon and Billy Zane as Ishamael and aired after midnight with no announcements or publicity. Harriet McDougal initially stated she was unaware of the show ahead of time, and that the film rights to The Wheel of Time were set to revert to the Bandersnatch Group, her company, a few days later on 11 February 2015. Her comments triggered a slander lawsuit with Red Eagle, which was ultimately dismissed during settlement talks that July. In an interview with io9, Red Eagle Entertainment's CEO Rick Selvage stated "it was more of an [issue of] getting it on the air." A spokesman for FXX stated that the channel was paid to air the show, but Selvage hinted that it was indeed produced with a future series in mind. "We think there's huge demand for the television series internationally, and we're looking forward to producing it and getting it out in the marketplace." On 29 April 2016, Harriet McDougal confirmed that the legal issues had been resolved and that a television series was in development.

==== Amazon Prime Video series ====
A new adaptation of the series was announced on 20 April 2017, produced by Sony Pictures Television in association with Red Eagle Entertainment and Radar Pictures, with Rafe Judkins as showrunner and executive producer. In February 2018, Amazon Studios announced a deal with Sony Pictures Television to co-develop the series for distribution on its streaming service Amazon Prime Video. The series was formally greenlit in October 2018. Principal photography for the first season began on 16 September 2019, was halted in March 2020 due to the COVID-19 pandemic, but had resumed by April 2021 and concluded in May 2021. On 20 May 2021, Amazon renewed the series for a second season ahead of the series premiere. The Wheel of Time premiered on 19 November 2021. Filming for the second season began on 19 July 2021, and concluded in February 2022. On 21 July 2022, ahead of the second-season premiere, Amazon renewed the series for a third season. The second season premiered on 1 September 2023, and combined elements from both The Great Hunt (1990) and The Dragon Reborn (1991), the second and third books in the series. The third season premiered on 13 March 2025 and combined elements of the third and fourth books, The Dragon Reborn (1991) and The Shadow Rising (1992). On May 23, 2025, Amazon canceled the series after three seasons; the third season had received a 97% approval rating on Rotten Tomatoes, up from 81% for the first season and 86% for the second.

==== Animated and live-action films ====
In July 2023, iwot productions (formerly Red Eagle Entertainment) and Squeeze Animation Studios announced The White Tower, a feature-length 3D animated film set before the events of the television series. The film, described as a YA action-adventure about a young girl learning magical powers, is written by Zack Stentz (Thor, X-Men: First Class). In October 2023, Jay Oliva (Batman: The Dark Knight Returns) was announced as director.

In December 2023, iwot productions announced The Age of Legends, the first in a planned trilogy of live-action films exploring the origins of the Wheel of Time universe. Set millennia before the novels, the film focuses on the emergence of the Dark One and the fall of the Forsaken. The film is directed by Kari Skogland (The Falcon and the Winter Soldier) from a screenplay by Zack Stentz, with Eva Longoria serving as executive producer.

== Reception ==
The eighth through fourteenth novels in the series each reached number one on the New York Times Best Seller list. After its completion, the series was nominated for a Hugo Award. As of 2021, the series has sold over 90 million copies worldwide, making it one of the best-selling epic fantasy series since The Lord of the Rings.

=== Fan culture ===
Many fans of The Wheel of Time attend Dragon Con, which had an exclusive Wheel of Time content track from 2001 through 2012. The Wheel of Time now has its own annual convention, JordanCon, which has been held annually in Atlanta, Georgia, since 2009. The 2020 convention was cancelled due to the COVID-19 pandemic. Instead, it took place over the Internet, some aspects being held through the use of the Zoom platform. The 2023 convention in April was the 15th anniversary of the founding of JordanCon.

A new convention titled WoTCon took place from 8–10 July 2022, in Dublin, OH. This convention was created to be dedicated to the world of The Wheel of Time in all media aspects: novels, social media, and the television series. The second convention took place 14–16 July 2023.
