= Katanga =

Katanga may refer to:

== Political entities ==
- Katanga Province, a former province of the Democratic Republic of the Congo
- State of Katanga, a breakaway state which existed from 1960 to 1963
  - Katanga Crisis or "Congo Crisis", a period of turmoil in the First Republic of the Congo from 1960 to 1965
- Haut-Katanga Province, a province of the Democratic Republic of the Congo, created in 2015
- History of Katanga, details of the region from early times, under Luba kingdom, Belgian rule, independent Congo

== Places ==
- Katanga, Dominican Republic, a section of Los Mina, founded by maroons from the Congo who fled French rule
- Katanga Plateau, a plateau in the Democratic Republic of the Congo
- Garenganze or Katanga in Central Africa, the home of the pre-colonial Yeke Kingdom of Msiri
- Katanga River, a river in Russia
- Katanga Slum, a settlement in central Uganda

== People ==
- Germain Katanga (born 1978), a Congolese militia leader
- Simon Katanga, a fictional character in the film Raiders of the Lost Ark

== Music ==
- Katanga, an album by saxophonist Curtis Amy

== Other uses ==
- 1817 Katanga, a main-belt asteroid
- Luba-Katanga language, a Bantu language spoken in the Democratic Republic of the Congo
- Katanga insurgency, an ongoing rebellion by a number of rebel groups in the Democratic Republic of the Congo

== See also ==
- Khatanga (disambiguation)
- Katana (disambiguation)
