= At the Edge of Time =

Studio album by Blind Guardian
- Released: 29 July 2010
- Recorded: 2009–2010
- Genres: Power metal; symphonic metal; progressive metal
- Length: 63:54
- Label: Nuclear Blast
- Producer: Charlie Bauerfeind

Blind Guardian chronology
A Twist in the Myth (2006)	At the Edge of Time (2010)	Beyond the Red Mirror (2015)

Singles from At the Edge of Time
- 1. "A Voice in the Dark" Released: 25 June 2010

At the Edge of Time is the ninth studio album by the German power metal band Blind Guardian. A two-CD version of the album was released, with the second disc containing eight tracks. The artwork for the album was created by Colombian artist Felipe Machado Franco. The album was released in Europe on 30 July 2010. A music video for "A Voice in the Dark" was released on 3 August 2010.

== Track listing ==
All music is composed by André Olbrich and Hansi Kürsch, except "You're the Voice" on the bonus CD, which was written by Andy Qunta, Keith Reid, Maggie Ryder and Chris Thompson.

No.	Title	Length
1.	"Sacred Worlds"	9:19
2.	"Tanelorn (Into the Void)"	5:58
3.	"Road of No Release"	6:30
4.	"Ride into Obsession"	4:47
5.	"Curse My Name"	5:49
6.	"Valkyries"	6:34
7.	"Control the Divine"	5:25
8.	"War of the Thrones"	4:55
9.	"A Voice in the Dark"	5:41
10.	"Wheel of Time"	8:56
Total length:		63:54

Japanese edition bonus tracks
No.	Title	Length
11.	"Curse My Name (Original)"	5:13
12.	"Valkyries (Extended)"	6:51
Total length:		75:58

Digipack bonus CD
No.	Title	Length
1.	"Sacred Worlds (Pre-production Version)"	6:49
2.	"Wheel of Time (Orchestral Version)"	8:55
3.	"You're the Voice (Radio Edit)" (John Farnham cover)	3:35
4.	"Tanelorn (Into the Void) (Demo Version)"	5:58
5.	"Curse My Name (Demo Version)"	4:41
6.	"A Voice in the Dark (Demo Version)"	5:40
7.	"Sacred (Video Clip)"
8.	"A Journey to the Edge of Time (Studio Documentary)"
Total length:		35:38

== Reception ==
Professional ratings
Review scores
Source	Rating
AllMusic	3.5/5 stars
Metal1	9.5/10
Lords of Metal	93/100
Danger Dog	4.5/5 stars
Metal Express Radio	8/10
Metal Hammer (GER)	6/7
Rock Hard	9/10

The album was named as "Album of the Month" in the August 2010 issue of Germany's Metal Hammer magazine.

At the Edge of Time was the first album in the band's history to climb to second place in the German Media Control Charts. It kept its place among the Top 10 for three straight weeks.

The album was particularly successful in the United States. Not only did it debut in the 108th position of the Billboard Top 200 chart but also became the No. 1 song on the Billboard Heatseekers chart. This marks the highest position that a Blind Guardian album had reached until then in the United States.

The album debuted at No. 18 on the Top Hard Music Albums chart and No. 108 on the Top 200 chart in Canada.

== Song information ==
- Sacred Worlds

An edited version of the original song "Sacred", which has a new orchestral intro and outro. It was written by Blind Guardian for the 2008 video game Sacred 2: Fallen Angel.

- Tanelorn (Into the Void)

Based on Michael Moorcock's The Eternal Champion series.

- Road of No Release

Based on Peter S. Beagle's The Innkeeper's Song.

- Ride into Obsession

Based on Robert Jordan's The Wheel of Time series.
(Hansi Kürsch: "An introduction to the main characters, the Dragon Reborn and the Dark Lord Ba'alzamon.")

- Curse My Name

Based on The Tenure of Kings and Magistrates, a political writing by John Milton where he legitimizes the killing of a king who didn't carry out his duties.

- Valkyries

Inspired by Norse mythology, especially Valkyries, as well as the perception of time.

- Control the Divine

Based on John Milton's Paradise Lost.

- War of the Thrones

Based on George R. R. Martin's A Song of Ice and Fire series.

- A Voice in the Dark

Based on George R. R. Martin's A Song of Ice and Fire series. It tells the story of Bran Stark, a key character in the series. This track was the first single from the album, and it is a small comeback to the band's original speed metal style.

- Wheel of Time

Based on Robert Jordan's The Wheel of Time series, focusing on (and through the viewpoint of) Rand al'Thor, the protagonist of the series.

== Personnel ==
Blind Guardian

- Hansi Kürsch – vocals
- André Olbrich – lead, rhythm and acoustic guitars
- Marcus Siepen – rhythm guitar
- Frederik Ehmke – drums, percussion, flute and bagpipes

Guest musicians

- Oliver Holzwarth – bass guitar

Additional personnel

- Felipe Machado Franco – cover artwork

== Charts ==
Chart (2010)	Peak position
Austrian Albums (Ö3 Austria)	9
Belgian Albums (Ultratop Wallonia)	67
Croatian International Albums (HDU)	7
European Albums	7
Finnish Albums (Suomen virallinen lista)	18
French Albums (SNEP)	48
German Albums (Offizielle Top 100)	2
Greek Albums (IFPI)	4
Italian Albums (FIMI)	19
Japanese Albums (Oricon)	29
Slovenian Albums	25
Spanish Albums (Promusicae)	47
Swedish Albums (Sverigetopplistan)	22
Swiss Albums (Schweizer Hitparade)	14
UK Independent Albums (Official Charts)	22
UK Rock & Metal Albums (Official Charts)	18
US Billboard 200	108

== Release history ==
Country	Release date
Russia	29 July 2010
Europe	30 July 2010
United States	24 August 2010
Japan	28 August 2010
