= Towers of Midnight =

2010 novel by Robert Jordan and Brandon Sanderson

- Final cover for Towers of Midnight featuring Mat Cauthon, Thom Merrilin and Noal Charin
- Author: Robert Jordan and Brandon Sanderson
- Cover artist: Darrell K. Sweet
- Language: English
- Series: The Wheel of Time
- Genre: Fantasy
- Publisher: Tor Books, Orbit Books
- Publication date: November 2, 2010
- Publication place: United States
- Media type: Print (hardcover and paperback), audiobook, e-book
- Pages: 863 (hardcover)
- ISBN: 978-0-7653-2594-5
- Preceded by: The Gathering Storm
- Followed by: A Memory of Light

Towers of Midnight is a fantasy novel by Robert Jordan and Brandon Sanderson. It is the sequel to the novel The Gathering Storm, and the 13th book in the Wheel of Time series.

The novel is the second part of A Memory of Light, Robert Jordan's projected final book. Because of the amount of material to cover, it was agreed by Jordan's wife, Tor Books and Brandon Sanderson to break the final book into three separate books. All three books are written by Sanderson with the aid of extensive notes left by the late Jordan. The title Towers of Midnight was proposed by Sanderson, replacing the working title of A Memory of Light: Shifting Winds. It was released on November 2, 2010 and is 328,000 words long. The book debuted at #1 on The New York Times Best Seller list.

== Pre-release information ==
On August 30, 2010, Tor Books, in conjunction with the release of Sanderson's 2010 novel, The Way of Kings, announced that Sanderson would hand out bumper stickers throughout his promotional book tour. Some of the bumper stickers contained a code which would unlock one page of the Towers of Midnight. Fans were able to guess the codes without receiving a bumper sticker and unlocked an entire chapter (Chapter 8). The final code was placed in Venice, Italy. The codes were the chapter names of Towers of Midnight. This event was promoted by Tor at Brandon Sanderson's request, and was able to generate an unexpectedly high amount of involvement from the fan community.

== Plot summary ==
=== Perrin Aybara and Egwene al'Vere ===
Moving through Ghealdan, Perrin Aybara and his followers encounter the Children of the Light, of whom Jaret Byar and Dain Bornhald accuse Perrin (correctly) of killing two of their colleagues. When Galad Damodred discovers his stepmother Morgase Trakand among the refugees, Galad and Perrin agree to a trial with Morgase as the judge under Andoran law. Perrin reveals his ability to speak with wolves and claims as his defense the fact that the two men killed his wolf friends; but Morgase judges Perrin guilty of "illegal killing" under an obscure law governing mercenaries. Perrin agrees to abide by Galad's ruling after Tarmon Gai'don; but Galad does not immediately pronounce sentence.

Faile Bashere and Berelain sur Paendrag agree that Berelain will publicly denounce the rumors that Perrin and Berelain were paramours during Faile's imprisonment; whereafter Berelain attaches herself to Galad. Nae'blis Moridin charges fellow Forsaken Graendal with killing Perrin; and he gives her a ter'angreal called a "dreamspike", one of two he possesses, that hinders both Traveling and movement in the real world, as well as the service of his minion Isam. Graendal orders Isam to plant the device so that Perrin's Asha'man Jur Grady and Fager Neald cannot form gateways, enabling her to destroy his forces with an army of Trollocs. Perrin enters into the dream world to remove it, but is attacked by Isam in the process. Despite superior numbers due to the wolves helping him, Isam's mastery of the dream world enables him to easily kill several wolves. Not wanting anyone else to be hurt, Perrin takes the dreamspike and lures Isam away, despite his movement being limited by the device, eventually reaching Tar Valon, with Isam in pursuit.

Egwene al'Vere plots to find the Forsaken Mesaana, while also dealing with a series of murders of Aes Sedai, but refuses to bond Gawyn Trakand as a Warder due to his disobedience; and when he confronts an intruder outside Egwene's chambers, it disrupts the wards she had set against Mesaana. Gawyn, while visiting Elayne in Caemlyn, learns that the murders are the work of 'Bloodknives', the Seanchan's assassins. Egwene arranges a meeting of the Hall of the Tower in Tel'aran'rhiod with the hidden agenda of drawing Mesaana into a trap while attending another secret meeting of Aes Sedai, Aiel Wise Ones, and Sea Folk Windfinders, to discuss cooperation among the channeling women of the three cultures. However, rather than simply spying on the Hall as intended, Mesaana and the Black Ajah immediately attack, causing a battle to ensue, with the dreamspike moved by Perrin keeping Mesaana from escaping. Mesaana attempts to hold Egwene with an a'dam; but Egwene's mastery of Tel'aran'rhiod enables her to break Mesaana's mind. Gawyn returns to Tar Valon to stop three Bloodknives from killing Egwene; whereupon Egwene awakens and bonds with Gawyn, whom she agrees to marry.

On the Tower grounds, Hopper and Perrin fight Isam, and Isam kills Hopper, forever ending any chance of a rebirth for the wolf. Perrin destroys the dreamspike by dropping it into a nightmare that has taken the form of a volcano. Perrin escapes from Isam by returning to the real world. Perrin feels compelled to forge a war hammer, and Neald discovers a Talent for creating a Power-forged weapon, resulting in a hammer that Perrin names Mah'alleinir, "he who soars" in the Old Tongue. Meanwhile, Galad's Children are unaware that they are about to be ambushed by the Trolloc army intended for Perrin. Perrin's army attacks first, destroying the Trollocs and saving the Children. Galad sets a light sentence for Perrin's crimes: he must make financial restitution to the families of the two slain men and he must fight in the Last Battle. Jaret Byar attempts to kill Perrin, but Byar is instead killed by Dain Bornhald, who no longer believed that Perrin killed his father Geofram due to the inability of Byar to give evidence in favor of the charge at the trial. Galad accepts Perrin's proposal to join Perrin's force and swears to remain under Perrin's command until the last battle is over.

The Dark One's hand, Shaidar Haran, blames Forsaken Graendal for the deaths of three Forsaken (Mesaana, Aran'gar, and Asmodean), and begins to punish her.

=== Mat Cauthon and Elayne Trakand ===
Mat Cauthon meets Andoran Queen Elayne Trakand in Caemlyn to discuss building "dragons" (artillery) to former Illuminator Aludra's specifications. They bargain over who gets to keep how many dragons, and Mat agrees to let Elayne borrow the foxhead ter'angreal he wears to block the One Power, so that she can make copies.

Elayne uses an angreal to weave a disguise, in an attempt to impersonate one of the Forsaken. She questions Black Sister Chesmal, but she is exposed after the arrival of Chesmal's Black Sisters Eldrith and Temaile, as well as the secretary of House Caeren's head Sylvase. She uses Mat's ter'angreal and a copy of it she made to defeat them, but after a surprise appearance by her Darkfriend former guard Doilen Mellar, she loses both medallions to him. In desperation, she uses the One Power to collapse the roof on him. She regains the original ter'angreal, but Mellar escapes with a copy.

Mat and Talmanes lure the gholam into a trap; after battling the creature into a burning building, Mat wounds it with Elayne's copies of his own medallion, and forces it into a Skimming gateway wherein he corners and pushes into the endless void, dooming to fall forever.

When Perrin and his group arrive, Morgase convinces Elayne to let Perrin administer the Two Rivers under Andoran rule. Elayne uses the dragons, and a promise of estates in Andor for Cairhienin nobles, to convince the Cairhienen to make her queen of Cairhien, uniting the kingdoms of Andor and Cairhien.

Mat, Thom Merrilin, and Noal enter the Tower of Ghenjei to rescue Moiraine Damodred, who has been thought dead since she fell through a ter'angreal portal while battling the Forsaken Lanfear. Guided by Mat's luck through an extra-dimensional labyrinth, the three ward off the cunning Eelfinn with fire, music and the threat of iron weapons. Upon finding her, Mat strikes a bargain with the Eelfinn for safe passage outside, offering them 'half the light of the world'-his left eye plucked mercilessly from its socket. Though they begin to leave, the snake-like Aelfinn chase after them, Mat having left them out of the prior bargain. Noal, revealing himself as the folk hero Jain Farstrider, offers to stay behind and buy the others time to escape. Driven to a dead end, hope seems dead, until Mat realizes his ashandarei polearm is their key to safe passage from the Tower, rending the walls and earning their freedom. Safe outside, Moiraine awakes to reveal herself severely weakened in the One Power due to her capture (though in possession of a supremely powerful angreal), and in love with Thom, who gladly reciprocates. As they share news of the world with her, they prepare to find Rand before the Last Battle is begun.

=== Rand al'Thor ===
Fresh from his soul-saving epiphany on the slopes of Dragonmount, Rand al'Thor proceeds to the world to fight the Dark One's touch, his positive demeanor righting the wrongs the Shadow had been allowed to perpetrate. Much to the surprise of all involved, he then embarks to the White Tower to deliver a stunning announcement to Egwene al'Vere, the Amyrlin Seat: he intends to shatter the remaining seals on the Dark One's prison in order to erect a more permanent replacement. Unable to convince him of the dangers, she concedes to meet him in one month's time at the Fields of Merrilor at his request. Desperate to delay what she could only believe was the doom of the world, Egwene hastens a plan to unite the nations of the world in hopes of stopping the Dragon's seeming madness.

After dispelling a pair of powerful Darkfriends within his own ranks of Tairens, he Travels with Min Farshaw to the ruined port of Bandar Eban, which he had abandoned to starvation and decay. His demeanor and influence brightened, he quickly proceeds to set the city right on its feet, feeding the hungry and raising the downtrodden. He then heads north to the beleaguered fortress of Maradon, the main city of Saldaea, seized by countless Shadowspawn descended from the Blight. Though bravely fought by forces commanded by famed general Rodel Ituralde, the forces of Light are hopelessly overwhelmed, the city on the brink of destruction. Enraged by the plight of the men he had nearly consigned to death, Rand places himself at the forefront of the Shadow's assault, and repels the horde of tens of thousands single-handedly with an unimaginable amount of the One Power. Unfortunately, he is unable to help the nations of Kandor and Arafel which also are overwhelmed by Shadowspawn.

He now prepares to parley with the forces of the nations gathered at the Fields of Merrilor, poised precipitously close to the Blight border, and the advent of Tarmon Gai'don. At the end of the book, while sleeping at the Fields of Merrilor, the night before the parley, Rand hears a scream in a dream of a woman he does not recognize. Her face is different but he knows she is Mierin Eronaile, also known as Lanfear. She begs him to help her escape from the torture but the wall falls away and she tumbles into darkness.

=== Aviendha ===
Meanwhile, finally allowed to undertake the final test to becoming a Wise One, Aviendha journeys through the Aiel Waste, making her way to the ancient city of Rhuidean. During her trek, a wandering Aiel named Nakomi visits her and asks to share her fire; after beginning an innocuous conversation, the mysterious woman muses to Aviendha about the fate of the Aiel, once their toh to the Dragon has been met. The question perplexes Aviendha, and worries her, as it seems the Aiel might lose purpose and meaning once the Last Battle was fought. After arriving in Rhuidean and passing the final trial of the crystal columns (a comprehensive history of the 'shame' of the Aiel, as seen through her ancestor's eyes), she attempts to learn more of the ter'angreal through which she had just passed by touching them. This inadvertently reveals to Aviendha what may be the future of the Aiel, where her own descendants begin a chain of events that would allow the Seanchan to overtake the wetlands, drive the Aiel into hiding, and systematically reduce them to pathetic scavengers, all knowledge of ji'e'toh abandoned, and finally driven to extinction. Faced with this crushing possibility, Aviendha leaves Rhuidean to find Rand, desperate for any chance to right this grim future.

=== The Black Tower ===
Mazrim Taim is ruling the black tower with an iron fist. Logain has been absent from the Black Tower for some time. Several of the Aes Sedai who have traveled to the tower originally sent by the leader of the Red Ajah have been given permission to bond some of the Soldiers and Dedicated; however, none have been bonded. The entirety of the Tower is guarded, entry and exit are strictly monitored, and the behavior of many Aes Sedai and Asha'man have changed significantly and disturbingly; some of Taim's most ardent detractors seem only to sing his praises, and behave as if in hollow imitation of themselves. Gateways fail upon construction, confining those within Tower grounds to the watch of Taim and his faithful. A small group of Soldiers and Dedicated, including Androl Genhald, Emarin, Jonneth, Canler and the Two Rivers Asha'man, denied the Dragon even though their skills may warrant it, take notice of the darkness that seems to grip the Tower and its inhabitants, and desperately try to glean Taim's intentions while managing their own escape to Logain and the Dragon Reborn.
