= Kitana (disambiguation) =

Kitana may refer to:

- Kitana, a Mortal Kombat character
- Cherie Roberts or Kitana Jade, an adult model

== See also ==
- Katana (disambiguation)
