= Wheel of time =

Religious and philosophical concept of cyclical, repeating epochs or ages

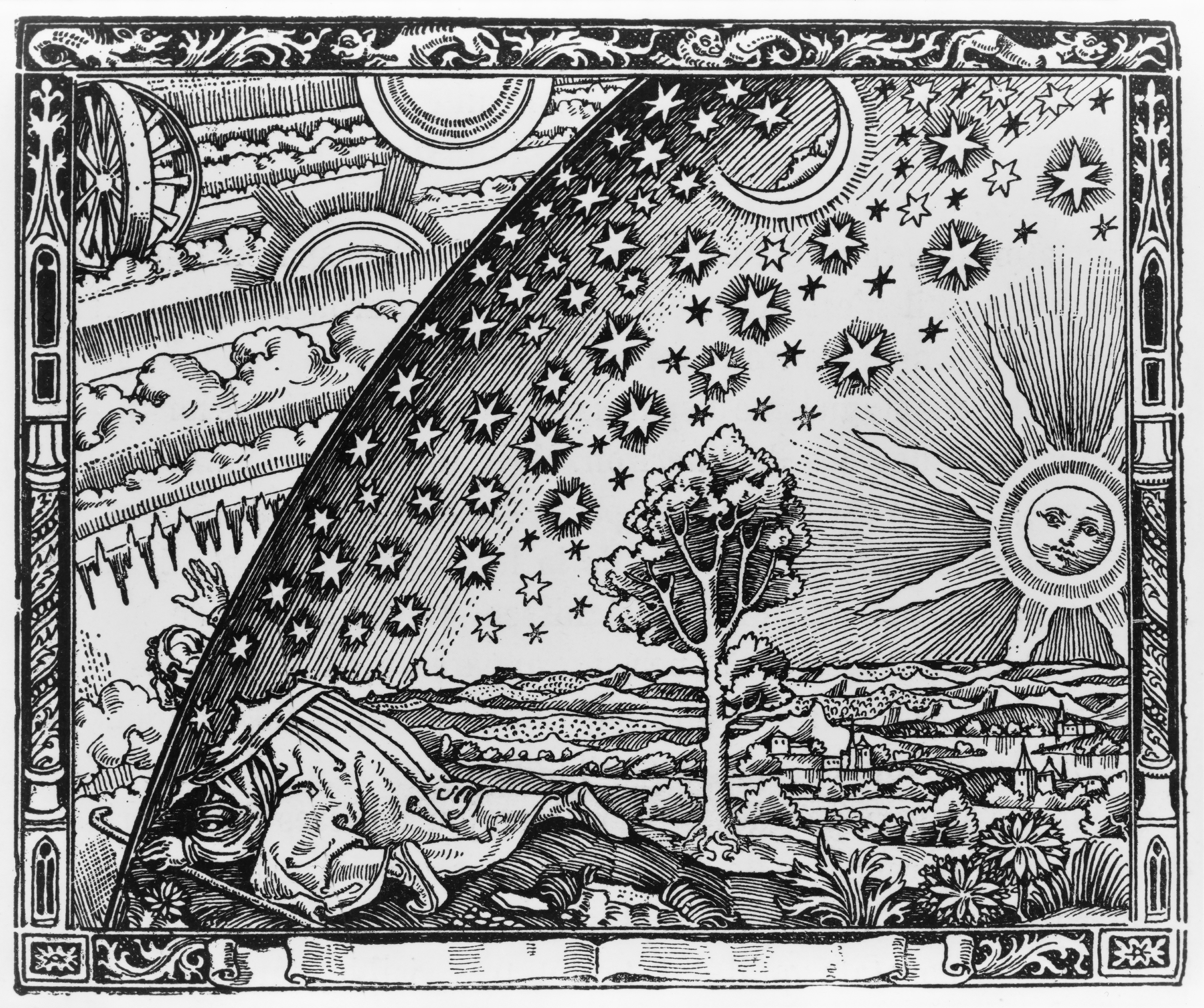
Camille Flammarion's L'atmosphere (1888)

The wheel of time or wheel of history (also known as Kalachakra) is a concept found in several religious traditions and philosophies, notably religions of Indian origin such as Hinduism, Jainism, and Buddhism, which regard time as cyclical and consisting of repeating ages. Many other cultures contain belief in a similar concept: notably, the Q'ero people of Peru, the Hopi people of Arizona, and the Bakongo people of Angola and Democratic Republic of the Congo.

== Ancient Africa ==
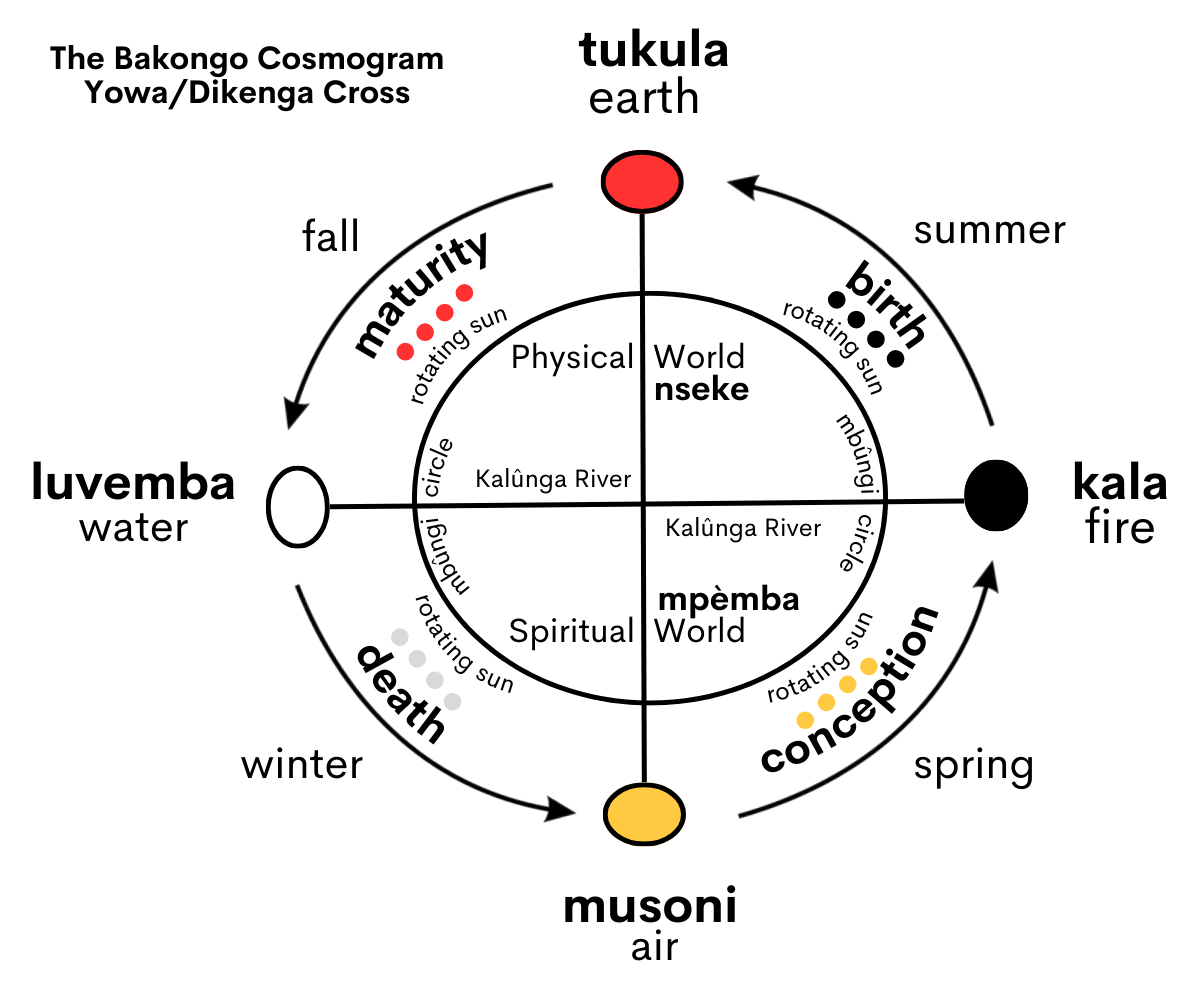
The Bakongo Cosmogram

In traditional Bakongo religion, the four elements are incorporated into the Kongo cosmogram. This sacred wheel depicts the physical world (Nseke), the spiritual world of the ancestors (Mpémba), the Kalûnga line that runs between the two worlds, the sacred river (mbûngi) that began as a circular void and forms a circle around the two worlds, and the path of the sun. Each element correlates to a period in the life cycle, which the Bakongo people also equate to the four cardinal directions and seasons. According to their cosmology, all living things go through this cycle.

- Mbûngi represents aether and is the void that exists before creation.
- Musoni time (South) represents air and is the period of conception that takes place during spring.
- Kala time (East) represent fire and is the period of birth that takes place during summer.
- Tukula time (North) represents earth and is the period of maturity that takes place during fall.
- Luvemba time (West) represents water and is the period of death that takes place during winter.

== Ancient Rome ==
The philosopher and emperor Marcus Aurelius saw time as extending forwards to infinity and backwards to infinity, while admitting the possibility (without arguing the case) that "the administration of the universe is organized into a succession of finite periods".

== Buddhism ==
The Wheel of Time or Kalachakra is a Tantric deity that is associated with Tibetan Tantric Buddhism, which encompasses all four main schools of Sakya, Nyingma, Kagyu and Gelug, and is especially important within the lesser-known Jonang tradition.

The Kalachakra tantra prophesies a world within which (religious) conflict is prevalent. A worldwide war will be waged which will see the expansion of the mystical Kingdom of Shambhala led by a messianic king.

== Hinduism ==
In Hindu cosmology, kala (time) is eternal, repeating general events in four types of cycles. The smallest cycle is a maha-yuga (great age), containing four yugas (dharmic ages): Satya Yuga, Treta Yuga, Dvapara Yuga and Kali Yuga. A manvantara (age of Manu) contains 71 maha-yugas. A kalpa (day of Brahma) contains 14 manvantaras and 15 sandhyas (connecting periods), which lasts for 1,000 maha-yugas and is followed by a pralaya (night of partial dissolution) of equal length, where a day and night make one full day. A maha-kalpa (life of Brahma) lasts for 100 of Brahma's years of 12 months of 30 full days (100 360-day years) or 72,000,000 maha-yugas, which is followed by a maha-pralaya (full dissolution) of equal length.

== Jainism ==
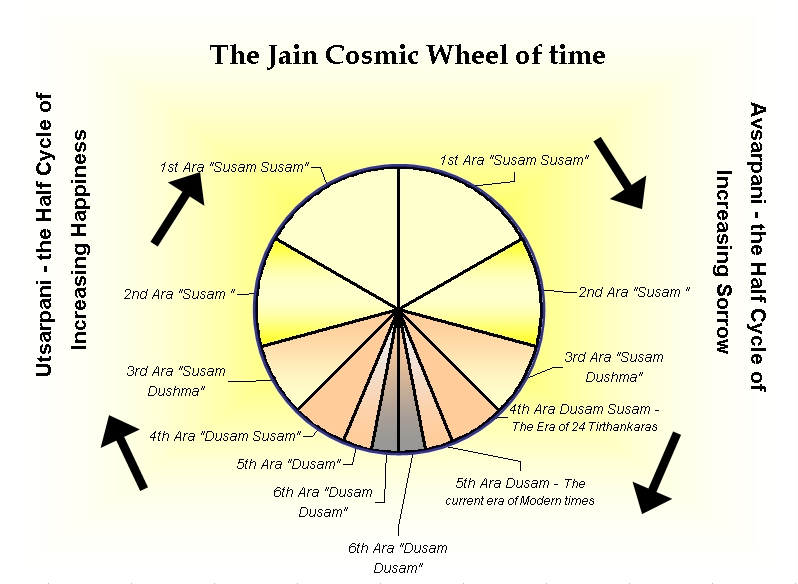
Kalachakras in Jainism

Within Jainism, time is thought to be a wheel that rotates for infinity without a beginning. This wheel of time holds twelve spokes that each symbolize a different phase in the universe's cosmological history. It is further divided into two equal halves having six eras in them. While in a downward motion, the wheel of time falls into what is known as Avasarpiṇī and when in an upward motion, enters a state called Utsarpini. During both motions of the wheel, 24 tirthankaras come forth to teach the three jewels or sacred Jain teachings of right faith, right knowledge, and right practice, then create a spiritual ford across the ocean of rebirth for humanity.

== Modern usage ==
=== Literature ===
In an interview included with the audiobook editions of his novels, author Robert Jordan has stated that his bestselling fantasy series The Wheel of Time borrows the titular concept from Hindu mythology.

The first chapter of every book in the series begins with the lines: "The Wheel of Time turns, and ages come and pass, leaving memories that become legend. Legends fade to myth, and even myth is long forgotten when the Age that gave it birth comes again."

== See also ==
- Eternal return
- Wheel of the Year
