= Suzuki Katana AY50 =

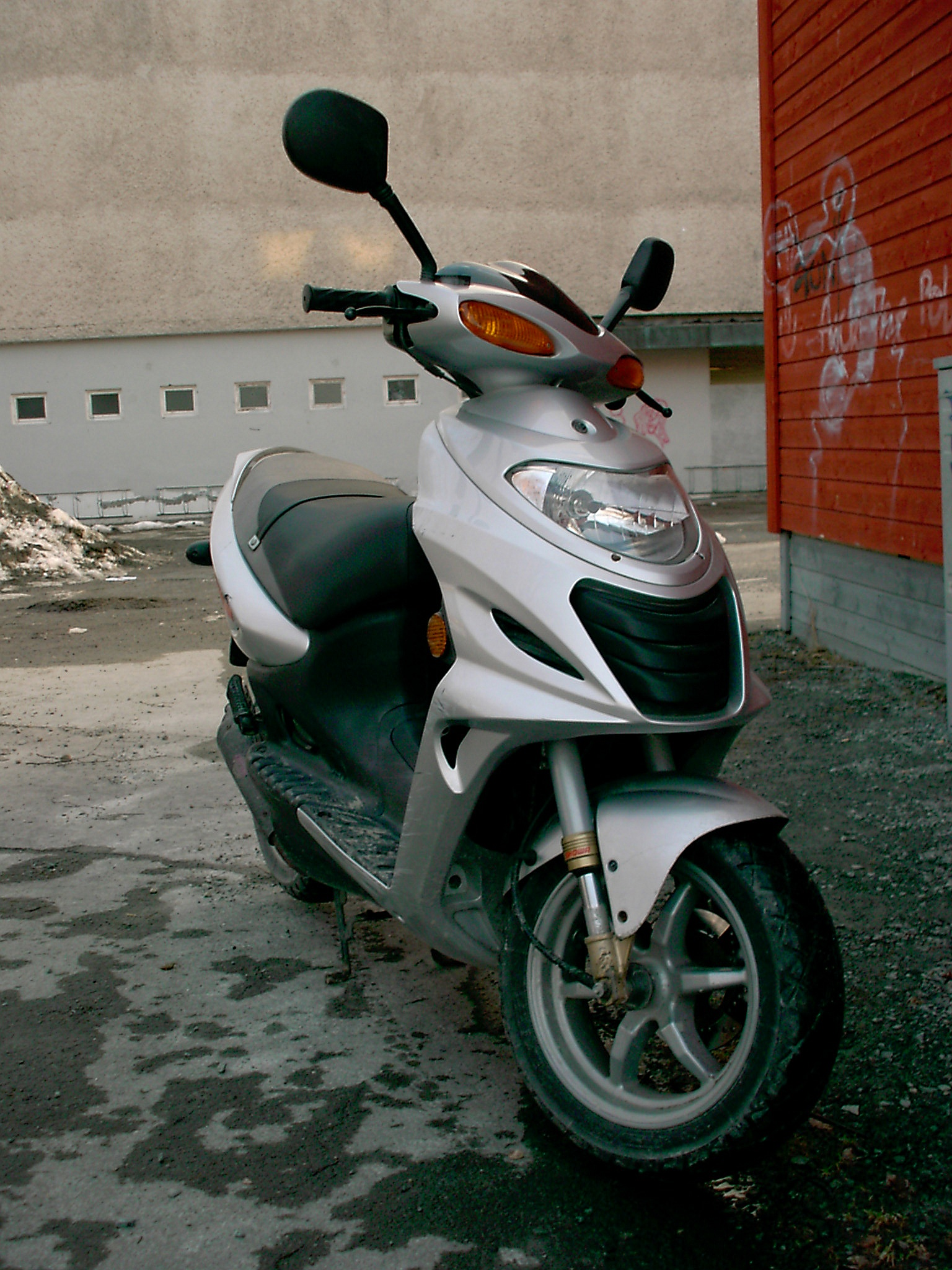
- 2001 Suzuki Katana AY50
- Manufacturer: Suzuki
- Production: 1997–2005
- Class: Moped
- Engine: 49 cc (3.0 cu in), two-stroke, air-cooled, single
- Ignition type: Kick and electric start
- Transmission: Continuously variable automatic transmission
- Brakes: Disc front, drum rear
- Tires: Front 120/70-12; Rear 130/70-12
- Wheelbase: 1,200 mm (47 in)
- Dimensions: L: 1,890 mm (74 in); W: 650 mm (26 in)
- Seat height: 790 mm (31 in)
- Fuel capacity: 6 L (1.3 imp gal; 1.6 US gal)

The Suzuki Katana AY50 is a 49cc scooter produced by Suzuki since 1997 and sold primarily in Europe. It is named after the early 1980s motorcycle of the same name. The designation "AY" indicates that it has a two-stroke engine (A) and that it is intended for use in urban areas (Y).

The scooter was widely criticised by the motorcycle press and enthusiasts of the classic motorcycle over the name as for damaging credibility of the Katana name.

== Design ==
Some of the parts used on the Katana are clearly inspired by racing, like the carbon-look Magneti-Marelli instruments and the Showa upside-down front suspension. A helmet can be stored in a space below the seat on the early models, the later facelift model had a plastic plate under the seat which was welded in position to stop a crash helmet being fitted under the seat because Honda said they would sue Suzuki as Honda patented the MET-IN design used firstly on the Honda SA50 vision met-in 50cc moped. These AY50 Scooters were manufactured by the Spanish.

== Specifications ==
The powerplant of the Katana is a two-stroke engine with a displacement of 49 cubic centimeters manufactured by a joint-venture between Suzuki and Franco Morini producing 2.43 kW. Being just below 50 cm^{3}, it is regarded as a moped in most countries. In addition to the air-cooled AY50, a liquid-cooled version designated the AY50R is produced. It had an inlet reduction and different exhaust throttle.

The engine of the AY50 is also used in the Suzuki Estilete UF50 and Zillion UX50.

As with most popular scooters and mopeds, many aftermarket modifications and replacement parts to increase acceleration and top speed exist. However, in most countries tuning of 50 cm^{3} vehicles will change their legal status to be a motorcycle rather than a moped, and an appropriate drivers licence and road registration is required to use them on public roads.
