= Beyond the Red Mirror =

Studio album by Blind Guardian
- Released: 30 January 2015
- Recorded: 2014
- Studios: Twilight Hall Studio, Grefrath, Germany
- Genres: Power metal; symphonic metal; progressive metal
- Length: 65:03; 70:54 (limited editions and vinyl versions); 76:42 (earbook version)
- Label: Nuclear Blast
- Producer: Charlie Bauerfeind

Blind Guardian chronology
At the Edge of Time (2010)	Beyond the Red Mirror (2015)	Legacy of the Dark Lands (2019)

Singles from Beyond the Red Mirror
- 1. "Twilight of the Gods" Released: 5 December 2014

Beyond the Red Mirror is the tenth studio album by the German power metal band Blind Guardian, released on 30 January 2015 through Nuclear Blast.

A concept album and a sequel to Imaginations from the Other Side's two tracks, "Bright Eyes" and "And the Story Ends", Beyond the Red Mirror has been described by singer Hansi Kürsch as "a story between science fiction and fantasy. [...] The two worlds described have changed dramatically for the worse since then. While there used to be several passages between the worlds, there is only one gate left now: The Red Mirror. It has to be found at any cost."

It is their first album without former session member Oliver Holzwarth on bass guitar since 1998's Nightfall in Middle-Earth, with Barend Courbois replacing him. "Twilight of the Gods" was released as a single to promote this album.

== Critical reception ==
Professional ratings
Review scores
Source	Rating
AllMusic	4/5 stars
Blabbermouth.net	9.5/10
Rock Hard	9.5/10
Lords of Metal	95/100
Metal1	10/10

Beyond the Red Mirror has received positive reviews. Ray Van Horn Jr. of Blabbermouth.net, who gave the album a rating of nine-and-a-half out of ten stated, "Previewing their tenth album Beyond the Red Mirror with the previously released Twilight of the Gods single, German power-symphonic metal maestros Blind Guardian capitalize on a long break with an encompassing and magical effort. For Beyond the Red Mirror, the band worked with three different worldwide choirs from Budapest, Prague and Boston, along with two full-scale orchestras bearing 90 members apiece. The results are as larger-than-life as the band intended, fleshing out a sci-fi and fantasy piece bridged to their 1995 album, Imaginations from the Other Side."

== Track listing ==
All lyrics are written by Kürsch; all music is composed by André Olbrich and Hansi Kürsch, except where noted.

I. The Cleansing of the Promised Land
No.	Title	Music	Length
1.	"The Ninth Wave"	Olbrich, Matthias Ulmer, Kürsch	9:28
2.	"Twilight of the Gods"		4:50

II. The Awakening
No.	Title	Length
3.	"Prophecies"	5:26
4.	"At the Edge of Time"	6:54

III. Disturbance in the Here and Now
No.	Title	Music	Length
5.	"Ashes of Eternity"		5:39
6.	"The Holy Grail"	Frederik Ehmke, Olbrich, Kürsch	5:59

IV. The Descending of the Nine
No.	Title	Music	Length
7.	"The Throne"	Olbrich, Charlie Bauerfeind, Kürsch	7:54

V. The Fallen and the Chosen One
No.	Title	Music	Length
8.	"Sacred Mind"		6:22
9.	"Miracle Machine"	Michael Schüren, Kürsch	3:03

VI. Beyond the Red Mirror
No.	Title	Length
10.	"Grand Parade"	9:28

=== Bonus tracks limited, vinyl, and earbook versions ===
"Chapter IV. The Mirror Speaks", which contains only one track, "Distant Memories", was put right between the two tracks "Chapter III. Disturbance in the Here and Now". This caused the second track from that chapter, "The Holy Grail", to end up in a new chapter, "V. Disturbance in the Here and Now (Reprise)". "Chapter IX. Damnation", which contains only one track, "Doom", is just a bonus epilogue chapter.

Some copies of the earbook came with a bonus vinyl disc, containing alternate versions of two album tracks.

IV. The Mirror Speaks
No.	Title	Length
6.	"Distant Memories"	5:51

IX. Damnation
No.	Title	Music	Length
12.	"Doom"	Marcus Siepen, Olbrich, Kürsch	5:48

Bonus 10" vinyl single
No.	Title	Length
1.	"Grand Parade" (Alternate Version)	9:26
2.	"Miracle Machine" (Alternate Mix)	3:04

== Lyrical references ==
- "Sacred Mind" may refer to Shangdu, the capital city of Kublai Khan's empire, particularly as referenced in Samuel Taylor Coleridge's poem "Kubla Khan". It could also be inferred to be about Xanadu, the large estate owned by the title character in the 1941 film Citizen Kane.
- The bonus track "Doom" was originally written for Nightfall in Middle-Earth. The version on this album has slightly rewritten lyrics to be able to fit the concept of this album better. It originally depicted Húrin being cursed by Morgoth, and traces of that idea appeared here while still showing what happened after "Grand Parade". "Doom" also appears on the 2018 deluxe edition of Nightfall in Middle-Earth with the original lyrics.

== Personnel ==
Blind Guardian

- Hansi Kürsch – vocals
- André Olbrich – lead, rhythm and acoustic guitars
- Marcus Siepen – rhythm guitar
- Frederik Ehmke – drums, percussion

Additional personnel

- Barend Courbois – bass
- Michael Schüren – piano
- Mattias Ulmer – keyboards, piano
- Thomas Hackmann, William "Billy" King, Olaf Senkbeil – the choir company
- Charlie Bauerfeind – production
- Felipe Machado Franco – cover and booklet artworks

Orchestras

- Hungarian Studio Orchestra Budapest (Peter Pejtsik – conductor)
- FILMharmonic Orchestra Prague (Adam Klemens – conductor)

Choirs

- Hungarian Studio Choir Budapest (Peter Pejtsik – conductor)
- FILMharmonic Choir Prague (Stanislav Mistr – conductor)
- Vox Futura Choir Boston (Andrew Shenton – conductor)

== Charts ==
Chart (2015)	Peak position
Austrian Albums (Ö3 Austria)	8
Belgian Albums (Ultratop Flanders)	84
Belgian Albums (Ultratop Wallonia)	118
Finnish Albums (Suomen virallinen lista)	14
French Albums (SNEP)	72
German Albums (Offizielle Top 100)	4
Hungarian Albums (MAHASZ)	33
Italian Albums (FIMI)	36
Japanese Albums (Oricon)	45
Scottish Albums (Official Charts)	54
Spanish Albums (Promusicae)	31
Swedish Albums (Sverigetopplistan)	34
Swiss Albums (Schweizer Hitparade)	10
UK Albums (Official Charts)	54
UK Independent Albums (Official Charts)	11
UK Rock & Metal Albums (Official Charts)	5
