= Mohamed Katana =

Kenyan footballer (born 1999)

Personal information
- Full name: Mohamed Katana Nyanje
- Date of birth: 24 December 1999 (age 26)
- Place of birth: Mombasa, Kenya
- Height: 1.70 m (5 ft 7 in)
- Position: Midfielder

Youth career
- 2013–2017: Aspire Academy
- 2017–2018: Sporting CP
- 2018: → Leixões (loan)

Senior career*
Years	Team	Apps	(Gls)
2019	Bandari		
2020	Isloch Minsk Raion	1	(0)
2021–2022	Vasalund	9	(0)
- * Club domestic league appearances and goals as of 31 December 2022

Mohamed Katana Nyanje (born 24 December 1999) is a Kenyan professional footballer. Besides Kenya, he has played in Portugal and Belarus.

== International career ==
Katana was called up to Kenya national football team for a friendly match against Zambia in October 2020, but did not debut, spending the game on the bench.
