= Winter's Heart =

2000 novel by Robert Jordan

- Original cover of Winter's Heart, showing Perrin Aybara leading Annoura, Balwer and Gaul
- Author: Robert Jordan
- Language: English
- Series: The Wheel of Time
- Genre: Fantasy
- Publisher: Tor Books (U.S.) & Orbit (UK)
- Publication date: November 7, 2000
- Publication place: United States
- Media type: Print (Hardback & Paperback)
- Pages: 781 (U.S. paperback edition) & 668 (U.S. hardback edition) & 640 (UK hardback edition)
- ISBN: 0-312-86425-6 (U.S. hardback edition) & ISBN 1-85723-984-9 (UK hardback edition)
- OCLC: 45066106
- Dewey Decimal: 813/.54 21
- LC Class: PS3560.O7617 W55 2000
- Preceded by: The Path of Daggers
- Followed by: Crossroads of Twilight

Winter's Heart is a fantasy novel by American author Robert Jordan, the ninth book of his series Wheel of Time. It was published by Tor Books and released on November 7, 2000. Upon its release, it immediately rose to the #1 position on the New York Times hardcover fiction bestseller list, making it the second Wheel of Time book to reach the #1 position on that list. It remained on the list for the next two months. Winter's Heart consists of a prologue and 35 chapters.

The book's title is a reference to the increasing coldness of Rand al'Thor's personality and to the return of winter following the reversal in the previous book, The Path of Daggers, of the unnatural heat caused by the Dark One's manipulation of the climate.

Winter's Heart was the first Wheel of Time book for which the prologue, entitled "Snow", was first sold as an ebook in advance of the physical release of the book. "Snow" was released by the Scribner imprint of Simon & Schuster in September 2000, two months before the publication of Winter's Heart.

== Plot summary ==
Many of the events of Winter's Heart take place simultaneously with the events of the next book, Crossroads of Twilight. Perrin Aybara and his followers pursue the Shaido Aiel who kidnapped his wife, Faile Bashere, while Elayne Trakand attempts to suppress rebellious nobles.

Mat Cauthon is trapped in the city of Ebou Dar in Altara, under Seanchan occupation. His escape is disrupted by a Seanchan noblewoman named Tuon, the heir to the Seanchan Crystal Throne; and Mat, having heard a prophecy of his own marriage to the Daughter of the Nine Moons, referring to Tuon herself, kidnaps her during his and his men's escape from the city.

Rand al'Thor is appointed a Warder by Elayne Trakand, Aviendha, and Min Farshaw; and later kills most of the Asha'man traitors in Far Madding. Lan also kills Toram Riatin in a duel. Caught by guards, Rand is imprisoned for a short time but is set free by Cadsuane and the other Aes Sedai. Rand and Nynaeve al'Meara Travel to Shadar Logoth. There, defended by Cadsuane Melaidhrin's Aes Sedai and loyal Asha'man against the Forsaken, Rand and Nynaeve use the Choedan Kal, two giant sa'angreal, to cleanse saidin of the Dark One's influence. In the process, Shadar Logoth, the access key to the female Choedan Kal, and the female Choedan Kal itself are destroyed.

== Release details ==
- 2000, U.S., Tor Books (ISBN 0-312-86425-6), Pub date November 7, 2000, hardcover (First edition)
- 2000, UK, Orbit (ISBN 1-85723-984-9), Pub date November 9, 2000, hardcover
- 2001, U.S., Tor Books (ISBN 0-312-87775-7), Pub date February ?, 2001, hardcover
- 2001, UK, Orbit (ISBN 1-84149-071-7), Pub date November 1, 2001, paperback
- 2002, U.S., Tor Books (ISBN 0-8125-7558-X), Pub date January ?, 2002, paperback
- 2003, U.S., Rebound by Sagebrush (ISBN 0-613-61150-0), Pub date July ?, 2003, hardcover (Library binding)

== Critical reception ==
For the Centre Daily Times, Jacob W. Michaels noted that, by this book, the series is "beginning to drag" due to the complexity of the story and the number of main characters. Despite entire chapters dedicated to backstory, one of the primary characters, rebel leader Egwene, is almost entirely ignored and separated from the plot, which Michaels complained was an ongoing trend of at least one overlooked character in each book in the series. He did say that the final scene of the book, which changed and recontextualized much of the prior works, was worth its entry in the series, but only for those already invested from reading the rest of the books.
