= The Eye of the World =

1990 high fantasy novel by Robert Jordan

- Original cover of The Eye of the World, prominently featuring Moiraine and Lan
- Author: Robert Jordan
- Cover artist: Darrell K. Sweet
- Language: English
- Series: The Wheel of Time
- Genre: High fantasy
- Publisher: Tor Books (U.S.) and Orbit (UK)
- Publication date: 15 January 1990
- Publication place: United States
- Media type: Print (hardback and paperback)
- Pages: 782 (U.S. hardback edition) & 685 (UK hardback edition)
- ISBN: 0-312-85009-3 (US hardback edition) & ISBN 1-85723-353-0 (UK hardback edition)
- OCLC: 19723327
- Dewey Decimal: 813/.54 20
- LC Class: PS3560.O7617 E94 1990
- Preceded by: New Spring
- Followed by: The Great Hunt

The Eye of the World is a high fantasy novel by American writer Robert Jordan and the first book in The Wheel of Time series. Published by Tor Books on January 15, 1990, it was initially released as a large paperback. The original unabridged audiobook is narrated by Michael Kramer and Kate Reading, with a later unabridged edition read by Rosamund Pike. The initial publication of The Eye of the World included a prologue and 53 chapters, with a subsequent re-release featuring an additional prologue titled Ravens. The book achieved both critical and commercial success. Critics lauded its tone and themes, while its similarities to The Lord of the Rings received both praise and criticism.

On January 2, 2002, The Eye of the World was re-released as two separate books, From the Two Rivers and To the Blight, targeting the young adult market with larger text and illustrations. From the Two Rivers included an additional prologue, "Ravens," focusing on Egwene al'Vere. The American Library Association included The Eye of the World on its 2003 list of Popular Paperbacks for Young Adults.

Following the release of The Wheel of Time television series, The Eye of the World appeared on The New York Times Best Seller list in January 2022 in the mass market category and reached number one on the audio fiction list.

== Plot ==
In the remote village of Emond's Field in the Two Rivers, the arrival of a mysterious noblewoman precedes an attack by Trollocs, humanoid monsters. The woman identifies herself as Moiraine Damodred, an Aes Sedai, and warns that servants of the Dark One seek one of three young men: Rand al'Thor, Perrin Aybara and Matrim Cauthon. They depart with Moiraine and her Warder, Lan Mandragoran, joined by Egwene al'Vere, whom Moiraine believes has Aes Sedai potential; the gleeman Thom Merrilin; and later the Wisdom Nynaeve al'Meara, a healer who discovers her ability to channel the One Power. Pursued by Trollocs, they seek refuge in the abandoned city of Shadar Logoth, where Mat steals a cursed dagger, becoming infected by the malevolent Mashadar.

Escaping the city, the travelers are separated. Rand, Mat, and Thom travel by boat to Whitebridge, where Thom is lost, allowing Rand and Mat to escape a Myrddraal, the eyeless creatures leading the Trollocs. In Caemlyn, Rand befriends an Ogier named Loial. Attempting to see the captured False Dragon, Rand meets Elayne Trakand, heir to Andor, and her brothers Gawyn Trakand and Galad Damodred. Rand is brought before Queen Morgase; her Aes Sedai advisor, Elaida; and Gareth Bryne, Captain-General of the Queen's Guard, and released, despite Elaida's warnings.

Egwene and Perrin are separately guided to Caemlyn by Elyas Machera, who communicates telepathically with wolves and claims Perrin shares this ability. They encounter the Tuatha'an, or Tinkers, and Aram, who expresses interest in Egwene and explains their belief in non-violence, The Way of the Leaf. The three encounter the Children of the Light, where Perrin kills two for killing a wolf and is sentenced to death. Moiraine, Lan, and Nynaeve rescue Egwene and Perrin, reuniting them with Rand and Mat. Moiraine decides Mat must go to Tar Valon to overcome Shadar Logoth's influence.

Loial warns Moiraine of a threat to the Eye of the World, a pool of Saidin untouched by the Dark One's influence, confirmed by dreams Mat, Rand, and Perrin have. The Eye of the World is protected by Someshta (the Green Man) and contains a seal on the Dark One's prison, the Dragon banner of Lews Therin Telamon, and the Horn of Valere. At the border of the civilized world, the group enters the Blight to protect the Eye. They meet the Green Man, who reveals the Eye, and are confronted by the Forsaken Aginor and Balthamel. Balthamel and the Green Man kill each other. Rand defeats Aginor and uses the Eye to decimate the Trolloc army and defeat Ba'alzamon. Moiraine concludes Rand is the Dragon Reborn, but withholds details of the final battle from the male members of the group except Lan.

== Two Rivers characters ==
- Rand al'Thor: A shepherd from the Two Rivers and, unknowingly, the Dragon Reborn. He was one of the three young men Moiraine identified as possibly being the Dragon Reborn. He, Mat, and Perrin are considered ta'veren. He can channel saidin, demonstrated by unconsciously healing Bela (his horse) while fleeing from Myrddraal and Trollocs. He also saved the forces of Fal Dara through his dreams. He is the (adopted) son of Tam and Kari al'Thor. He and Mat were separated from the group during the novel. Rand has dreams where he is confronted by the Dark One, who says Rand will either be an Aes Sedai puppet or die at the Dark One's hands if he refuses to serve. Rand refuses to be controlled. He is described as looking different from other Two Rivers townsfolk, with blue-grey eyes, "reddish" hair, extreme height, and the stubbornness common in the Two Rivers.
- Matrim Cauthon: A shepherd from the Two Rivers known for being a prankster and untrustworthy, except to his friends. He was one of the three young men Moiraine identified as possibly being the Dragon Reborn. He, Rand, and Perrin are considered ta'veren. He steals a dagger from Shadar Logoth, and is tainted by its evil. His ta'veren nature gives him luck. He has brown hair, brown twinkling eyes, and a mischievous nature.
- Perrin Aybara: A blacksmith from the Two Rivers and a "Wolfbrother," someone who can communicate with wolves and becomes more wolf-like in abilities, demeanor, and appearance, with "burnished golden" eyes that glow in the dark. He was one of the three young men Moiraine identified as possibly being the Dragon Reborn. He, Rand, and Mat are considered ta'veren. He and Egwene were separated from the group during the novel but later reunite with them. He is described as being very wide, with dark curly hair and eyes that turn gold as his abilities manifest. Perrin has a gentle personality and was thought of as slow due to his thoughtful nature.
- Egwene al'Vere: A woman from the Two Rivers, apprentice to Nynaeve al'Meara, and close to Rand al'Thor, Matrim Cauthon, and Perrin Aybara. Moiraine chooses her to train in Tar Valon because she has the "spark" to channel. She and Perrin were separated from the group during the novel but later reunite with them. She is described as being very pretty, with "huge brown eyes" and dark hair. Like many from the Two Rivers, Egwene is stubborn.
- Nynaeve al'Meara: A woman from the Two Rivers and the "Wisdom" of Emond's Field, the youngest ever chosen. She leaves to return Rand, Perrin, Mat, and Egwene to the village, but journeys with them when she realizes she cannot convince them and that she can channel. She, Moiraine, and Lan are separated from the rest of the group, during which time she develops feelings for Lan. She is described as having a temper and being headstrong and stubborn. She is shorter than most and has dark eyes and dark hair worn in a braid.

== Themes and allusions ==
Robert Jordan stated that he consciously intended the early chapters of The Eye of the World to evoke the Shire of Middle-earth in J. R. R. Tolkien's The Lord of the Rings. Despite their similarities, the two works differ in themes. Jordan and Tolkien created narratives that explored power, but The Eye of the World discussed how power can be deployed, whereas The Lord of the Rings focused more on its renunciation. Rand needed to wield his power to fight a war with the Dark One, a theme antithetical to Frodo's quest to destroy the ring of Sauron, a source of immense power that corrupted its wearer.

== Reception ==
PBS's The Great American Read named The Eye of the World "one of America's best-loved novels," ranking it #62 on their top 100 list.

== Release details ==
=== First printing ===
- 1990 (February), paperback. Tor Books, United States. ISBN 0-8125-0048-2
- 1990 (January 15), hardcover. Saint Martin's Press, United States. ISBN 0-312-85009-3
- 1990 (July 12), hardcover. Little, Brown, United Kingdom. ISBN 0-356-19068-4
- 1990 (July 12), hardcover. Orbit, United Kingdom. ISBN 1-85723-353-0
- 1992 (July 15), paperback. Orbit, United Kingdom. ISBN 1-85723-076-0

=== Reprinting ===
- 1993 (October), paperback. Tom Doherty Associates, United States. ISBN 0-812-51181-6
- 1995 (December), audio book. Gallant / Publishing Mills, United States. ISBN 1-879371-52-9
- 1999 (October), hardcover with library binding. Sagebrush, United States. ISBN 0-613-17634-0
- 2000 (September), paperback. Tor Books, United States. ISBN 0-8125-7995-X

=== Divided printing ===
In January 2002, Starscape Books released The Eye of the World in two volumes: From the Two Rivers (ISBN 0-7653-4184-0) and To the Blight (ISBN 0-7653-4221-9). ATOM, a British publishing house, printed both volumes (ISBN 1-904233-20-1 and ISBN 1-904233-19-8) the following March.
