= Katana (band) =

Swedish heavy metal band

Katana is a heavy metal band from Gothenburg, Sweden established in 2005. The 5-member includes Johan Bernspång on vocals, Patrik Essén (guitar), Susanna Salminen (bass guitar), Tobias Karlsson (guitar) and Anders Persson (drums). The name of the band Katana comes from Japanese katana, a backsword, because of Japanese influences on the band's music. They were signed with Listenable Records / Sony Music and managed by Gain / Magnus Lundbäck.

== Background and career ==
The group has been known as a member of the NWOSHM (New Wave of Swedish Heavy Metal). Both the title itself and the overall sound represented by it is akin to the previous NWOBHM (New Wave of British Heavy Metal).

The band earned the runner up status for the title in the Wacken Metal Battle in 2010.

Katana's debut album, titled Heads Will Roll, came out on January 28, 2011. Released by Listenable Records, it was produced by the band itself along with Andy LaRocque, an audio engineer and musician who had previously produced bands such as Dragonland, Lord Belial, and Sacramentum.

Sophomore release Storms of War came out on May 14, 2012. It was also released by Listenable Records.

On June 10, 2013, the group released a music video for the track "Yakuza", the visuals mixing a performance by the band with depictions of organized crime in action.

After being dropped from their label, the band independently distributed the album The Greatest Victory.

== Discography ==
=== Albums ===
| Year | Single | Peak position | Certification |
| Year | Single | SWE | Certification |
|---|---|---|---|
| 2011 | Heads Will Roll | 42 | |
| 2012 | Storms of War | 33 | |
| 2015 | The Greatest Victory | | |

=== EPs ===
- 2004: Blindfoldead
- 2005: Night Avengers
- 2006: Heart of Tokyo

=== Singles ===
- 2008: Rock 'N' Roll Disaster
- 2011: "Heart of Tokyo" (rerelease)
