= Billionaire Boys Club (disambiguation) =

The Billionaire Boys Club was a 1980s, Californian investment and social club run as a Ponzi scheme.

Billionaire Boys Club may also refer to:

- Billionaire Boys Club (1987 film), a 1987 TV movie about the club
- Billionaire Boys Club (2018 film), a 2018 film about the club
- Billionaire Boys Club (clothing retailer), a fashion brand established in 2003
