= Nafeez Ahmed =

British journalist, author and academic (born 1978)

- Born: 1978 (age 47–48)
- Education: University of Sussex
- Occupations: Journalist, author
- Website: nafeezahmed.net

Nafeez Mosaddeq Ahmed (/nəˈfiːz ˌmoʊzəˈdɛk ˈɑːmɛd/; born 1978) is a British investigative journalist, author and academic. He is editor of the crowdfunded investigative journalism platform INSURGE intelligence. He is a former environment blogger for The Guardian from March 2013 to July 2014. From 2014 to 2017, Ahmed was a weekly columnist for Middle East Eye, the London-based news portal founded by ex-Guardian writer David Hearst. He is 'System Shift' columnist at Vice covering issues around global systems crises and solutions. Ahmed is now Special Investigations Reporter at Byline Times.

As a filmmaker, Ahmed co-produced and wrote The Crisis of Civilization, and associate produced Grasp the Nettle, both directed by Dean Puckett. Ahmed's academic work has focused on the systemic causes of mass violence. His work applies systems theory to explore the intersection of multiple global crises, including climate, energy, financial, political, military, and others. He is also an adviser at the investigative journalism outlet Declassified UK.

== Education and career ==
Ahmed received an M.A. in contemporary war & peace studies and a DPhil (April 2009) in international relations from the School of Global Studies at Sussex University, where he taught for a period in the Department of International Relations. His Ph.D. thesis was a comparative analysis of Spanish and British colonisation of the Americas to uncover the processes that precipitated genocidal mass violence. He was a tutor at the Department of International Relations, University of Sussex, and has lectured at Brunel University's Politics & History Unit at both undergraduate and postgraduate levels, for courses in international relations theory, contemporary history, empire and globalization. From 2015 to 2018, he was visiting research fellow at the Global Sustainability Institute at Anglia Ruskin University's Faculty of Science & Technology.

Ahmed was previously founding executive director of the Institute for Policy Research & Development (IPRD) until 2013 when it ceased formal operation. The IPRD was a voluntary global network of scholars, scientists and researchers focused on 'Transdisciplinary Security Studies'. He is also founding convenor and principal author at Perennial, an IPRD project focusing on progressive Islamic theology. Perennial was co-founded by twenty-five Western Muslims to open up Islamic scholarly traditions to interdisciplinary analysis. The project was launched in 2016 on International Women's Day "to correct entrenched misreadings of Islam among Muslim and non-Muslim communities".

== Books ==
=== The War on Freedom and The War on Truth ===
Ahmed's first book, The War on Freedom: How and Why America was Attacked, September 11, 2001, published in 2002, was praised by the American essayist Gore Vidal in an essay published by The Observer in which Vidal described Ahmed's book as "the best and most balanced report" on 9/11.

Ahmed's later book, The War on Truth: 9/11, Disinformation and the Anatomy of Terrorism (2005), follows up from his first book, with a critical evaluation of the findings of the 9/11 Commission. In The War on Truth, he argues that the 9/11 attacks on New York City and Washington were facilitated due to US government relations with key state-sponsors of al-Qaeda in the Middle East and North Africa such as Saudi Arabia, Pakistan, Azerbaijan and many others.

Midwest Book Review reckoned Ahmed's book as an "informed and informative reading for anyone studying international terrorism, national security, and the clandestine machinery of Western power".

=== A User's Guide to the Crisis of Civilization ===
Ahmed's book, A User's Guide to the Crisis of Civilization: And How to Save It, received a notice in The Guardian which commented: "Ahmed could be charged with a certain ebullience in his delineating of potential catastrophe, which will necessitate 'the dawn of a post-carbon civilisation'. But his arguments are in the main forceful and well-sourced, with particularly good sections on agribusiness, US policies of 'energy security', and what he terms the 'securitisation' of ordinary life by western governments."

In The Oil Drum, Jeff Vail, a former US Department of Interior analyst specialising in energy infrastructure, "highly recommends" the book, concluding: "In the end, if the crisis of our modern civilization can be solved—or at least if the transition to whatever replaces it can be softened—then it will be through a syncretic understanding of the system of threats we face, such as that presented by Dr. Ahmed, that pave the way."

A review in Marx & Philosophy of Books criticises the book's approach to systems theory with regards to Ahmed's proposed solutions. Although the reviewer, Dr Robert Drury King, an assistant professor at Sierra Nevada College specialising in systems, acknowledges that "Ahmed draws convincingly and commandingly on a number of fields, including climate sciences, geology, monetary and financial economics, and systems theory, among many others. The impressive scope of the book owes to the fact that Ahmed is very deliberately a wide-ranging, interdisciplinary scholar" - he questions whether there is "a clear and feasible notion of systematicity" that is "applied methodologically to the resolution of the identified crises".

Following the publication of the book, Ahmed's chance meeting with filmmaker Dean Puckett led to the development of a feature documentary, The Crisis of Civilization. It was received positively by Hitcham Yezza, editor of Ceasefire magazine, for whom the "film is necessary viewing, not just for activists but for anyone who’s planning to hang around this planet for the foreseeable future".

== Recognition ==
Ahmed has twice been featured in the Evening Standard's list of the top 1,000 most influential Londoners, in 2014 and 2015. In 2013 and 2014, articles he wrote were listed by Project Censored on lists of important stories ignored or underreported by the mainstream media. He is a winner of the Routledge-GCP&S Essay Competition for his peer-reviewed journal paper critiquing conventional international relations approaches to global crises. In 2005, he testified in US Congress about his investigative work on the events leading up to 9/11, where he argued that Western states had undermined national security by using Islamist militant groups for geopolitical purposes in parts of Central Asia and the Middle East.

In 2018, Peter Oborne in the British Journalism Review described him as "one of the most courageous and interesting investigative reporters of our time" and "an expert on the environment and the war on terror ... His articles can make very uncomfortable reading for the media and political elite".

== Controversies ==
=== Disagreement with Christopher Hitchens over Gore Vidal ===
In Hitchens' 2010 essay in Vanity Fair about Gore Vidal's later writings, he also criticises Ahmed, whom Vidal drew for his 9/11 essay in The Observer. Hitchens wrote: "Mr. Ahmed on inspection proved to be a risible individual wedded to half-baked conspiracy-mongering."

Ahmed responded with a letter to the editor, published by Vanity Fair, asserting that Hitchens's article contained "major inaccuracies": "Hitchens's reduction of me to 'conspiracy-mongering' and as having a 'one-room sideshow' institute is contrasted by the fact that I'm an academic at the University of Sussex; my book, The War on Freedom, was used by the 9/11 commission; I've testified before the U.S. Congress; I've given evidence to a UK parliamentary inquiry; and my institute is advised by a board of 20 leading scholars.″ Ahmed followed up with a detailed critique of Hitchens' attack on both himself and Gore Vidal in a feature article published by The Independent on Sunday. He argued that:

the pre-9/11 intelligence failure was not simply because of a lack of reliable intelligence, or because intelligence bureaucracy was hopelessly incompetent (which it was and is), but ultimately because the Bush administration made political decisions that obstructed critical intelligence investigations and ongoing information-sharing that could have prevented 9/11. Those decisions were made to protect vested interests linked to US support of Islamist extremist networks like the Taliban and their state-sponsors, such as the Gulf kingdoms, rooted in Western oil dependency and intersecting financial investments. The inadequacy of the 9/11 Commission investigation, in this regard, is an open secret to many intelligence experts.

On the same day, The Independent on Sunday ran a news story on the whole episode, reporting that Ahmed "had not suggested there was a conspiracy [on 9/11], rather a 'dereliction of duty'", and that he had "used the word 'complicity' in a legal sense".

=== Discover magazine ===
In 2014, Discover published a blog article by Keith Kloor concerning Ahmed's Guardian article about a "NASA-sponsored" and funded study of the collapse of industrial civilisation. Kloor objected to the lack of independent responses to the paper, yet to be published at the time, from other scholars in the field. A second post by Kloor asserted that Ahmed had made an "uncritical appraisal" of the study. The story was reported internationally by other media outlets which incorrectly referred to the study reported by Ahmed as a "NASA study", although Ahmed's original Guardian report had not described it as such. In a statement, NASA commented that the collapse study "is an independent study by the university researchers utilizing research tools developed for a separate NASA activity. As is the case with all independent research, the views and conclusions in the paper are those of the authors alone."

In a follow-up clarification, Ahmed noted that the NASA statement had simply confirmed his original report, that NASA had funded an independent study specifically by financing the creation of the model it was based on.

At the time, Kloor also labelled Ahmed as a "doomer". A December 2013 blog post by Kloor asserts: "Once someone starts down this civilization-is-collapsing road, like Guardian blogger Nafeez Ahmed, it's hard to stop. If you want a tour guide to the apocalypse, Ahmed is your guy."

Ahmed rejected this characterisation of his work in his Guardian blog: "Rather what we are seeing ... are escalating, interconnected symptoms of the unsustainability of the global system in its current form. While the available evidence suggests that business-as-usual is likely to guarantee worst-case scenarios, simultaneously humanity faces an unprecedented opportunity to create a civilisational form that is in harmony with our environment, and ourselves."

=== Criticisms of 9/11 conspiracy theorists ===
In 2010, Jonathan Kay alleged that Ahmed is associated with the 9/11 truth movement; however, Ahmed has been critical of the 9/11 truth movement and has ridiculed 9/11 conspiracy theories.

According to Lance DeHaven Smith of Florida State University in American Behavioral Scientist journal, Ahmed catalogues "numerous defense failures on September 11, 2001" and raises questions about why the Pentagon "withheld from the 9/11 Commission evidence that military intelligence agents had uncovered the 9/11 hijackers' activities well in advance of September 2001." He cites Ahmed's work on 9/11 for making a major contribution to the systematic study of "State Crimes Against Democracy (SCADS)" that stands "in contrast to conspiracy theories": "The SCAD construct is designed to move beyond the debilitating, slipshod, and scattershot speculation of conspiracy theories by focusing inquiry on patterns in elite political criminality that reveal systemic weaknesses, institutional rivalries, and illicit networks".

On the fifth anniversary of the 9/11 terror attacks, Ahmed wrote a column for the Italian Left Magazine outlining outstanding questions that had not been sufficiently resolved by official inquiries. These included US geopolitical relationships with Islamist militants, intelligence failures, as well as questions about the official account of the collapse of the Twin Towers. But Ahmed firmly rejected the legitimacy of approaching these questions from "a prior ideological-conspiratorial agenda" and clarified: "The 9/11 families, and with them the wider public, have an elementary right to full answers to these basic questions. And I'm not about to offer you, the reader, an alternative all-explanatory theory, or a nice ready-made answer on a plate. I don't have one." In a further comment, he added: "... this article doesn't come from any particular preconceived ideological-theoretical agenda. It's only a catalogue of anomalies, consistent with a variety of explanations - so I'm establishing the need for further investigation and debate, not of any particular theory."

In another 2015 essay, Ahmed expressed more in-depth criticisms of the 9/11 truth movement, pointing out that reasonable questions about how the World Trade Center towers collapsed did not justify believing in controlled demolition or conspiracy theories. Instead he pointed to evidence of severe breaches of fire safety codes and removal of evidence raising "serious questions about corruption and cover up for vested interests - issues which continue to undermine national security to this day". He also dismissed the notion that evidence of controlled demolition could in itself automatically prove that the US government organised the 9/11 attacks:

"I'm on record as having stated several times that my stance on the WTC is not about conspiracy theory - I told a Channel 4 documentary on conspiracy theories some years ago that however the Twin Towers went down, no physical explanation proves an 'inside job.' Even if, and it's a big if indeed, it were proven beyond doubt that explosives were planted in the WTC, this in itself wouldn't prove that the US government perpetrated 9/11. There's a whole range of various scenarios consistent with this." He went on to add: "My position on 9/11 is pretty simple: I don't indulge in theory. I detest speculation. I particularly hate the very phrase 'inside job,' which is a meaningless bullshit euphemism... there is not a single alternative conspiracy theory of 9/11 blaming the state that does not itself contain holes and gaps. If you're going to point out the holes, gaps and anomalies in what the government says - and rightly so - have the balls to admit the holes in your own claims."

In The Independent in 2017, Ahmed argued that there is a strong case to investigate "the fact of systemic senior official negligence on 9/11, for which officials should be held accountable" and criticized those who dismiss such issues as "valiantly critiquing a straw-man conspiracy theory about 9/11". He further opined in his column at the New Internationalist, that these failures and omissions can be explained by the extent to which Western military and intelligence agencies have used Islamist terrorist networks "both to control strategic energy resources and to counter their geopolitical rivals", a strategy which he says to be well known to have occurred during the Cold War to counter the Soviet Union, but continued in the post-Cold War period.

== Bibliography ==
- The War on Freedom: How and Why America was Attacked, 11 September 2001: ISBN 0-930852-40-0, 400 pages, Progressive Press, 2002.
- Behind the War on Terror : Western Secret Strategy and the Struggle for Iraq: ISBN 0-86571-506-8, 352 pages Clairview Books, 2003.
- The War on Truth: 9/11, Disinformation, and the Anatomy of Terrorism: ISBN 1-56656-596-0, 459 pages, Olive Branch Press, 2005.
- The London Bombings: An Independent Inquiry: ISBN 0-7156-3583-2, 256 pages, Duckworth, 2006.
- A User's Guide to the Crisis of Civilization: And How to Save It: ISBN 978-0-7453-3053-2, Pluto Press, 2010.
- Zero Point, ISBN 978-1620075395, 348 pages, Curiosity Quills Press, 2014
- Failing States, Collapsing Systems: BioPhysical Triggers of Political Violence: ISBN 978-3319478142, 110 pages, Springer Publishing, 2016.
- Alt Reich: ISBN 9781916754140, 432 pages, Byline Books, 2025.

== Academic articles ==
- "The International Relations of Crisis and the Crisis of International Relations: From the Securitisation of Scarcity to the Militarisation of Society", Global Change, Peace & Security (Vol. 23, No. 3, October 2011)
- "Colonial Dynamics of Genocide: Imperialism, Identity and Mass Violence", Journal of Conflict Transformation & Security (Vol. 1, No. 1, April 2011) pp. 8–36
- "Overcoming Paralysis on Climate Change", Survival: Global Politics & Strategy (Vol. 53, No. 1, February–March 2011) pp. 203–206
- "Water, oil and demographics: The Arab world‟s triple crisis", Europe’s World: The Only Europe-Wide Policy Journal (Vol. 17, Spring 2011) pp. 121–123
- "Globalizing Insecurity: The Convergence of Interdependent Ecological, Energy and Economic Crises", Yale Journal of International Affairs (Vol. 5, No. 2, 2010) pp. 75–90
- "India and the Crisis of Civilization: Potential Impacts of Converging Ecological, Economic and Energy Catastrophes", India Economy Review (Vol. 7, March 2010) pp. 90–97
- "The Crisis of (Post) Modernity: The De-Sacralisation of the Social, the Death of Democracy, and the Reclamation of Islamic Tradition", Arches Quarterly (Vol. 3, No. 1, Summer 2009) pp. 25–32
- "Anglo-American World Order: 30 Years After the Islamic Revolution of Iran", Islamism Digest: Journal of the Centre for the Study of Terrorism (Vol. 4, No. 2, February 2009) pp. 14–19
- "Review – Purify and destroy: the political uses of massacre and genocide, by Jacques Semelin", International Affairs (Vol. 84, No. 4, July 2008) pp. 836–837
- "Terrorism and Western Statecraft", in Paul Zarembka (ed.), The Hidden History of 9-11-2002 (New York: Seven Stories Press, 2008) pp. 143–182
- "Structural Violence as a Form of Genocide: The Impact of the International Economic Order Archived 1 March 2017 at the Wayback Machine", Entelequia. Revista Interdisciplinar [Entelechy: Journal of Interdisciplinary Studies](University of Malaga, No. 5, Fall 2007) pp. 3–41
- "Terrorism and Western Statecraft: Al-Qaeda and Western Covert Operations After the Cold War", Research in Political Economy (Emerald: Vol. 23, 2006) pp. 149–188
- "UN Humanitarian Intervention in East Timor: A Critical Appraisal Archived 1 March 2017 at the Wayback Machine", Entelequia. Revista Interdisciplinar (University of Malaga, No. 2, Fall 2006) pp. 227–244
- "The Globalization of Insecurity: How the international economic order undermines human and national security on a world scale Archived 4 March 2016 at the Wayback Machine", Historia Actual [Contemporary History] (University of Cadiz, No. 5, 2004) pp. 113–126
- "The Discourse of Empire: United States National Security Strategies Since 1945", in Ronald Thoden (ed.), Terror und Staat: Der 11 September – Hintergrunde und Folgen: Goestregie, Terror, Geheimdienste, Medien, Kriege, Folter, Edition Zeitgeschichte (Berlin: Kai Homilius Verlag, 2004)
- "State Terrorism at the Dawn of the New American Century", Afterword to William Blum [former State Department official], ll libro nero degli Stati Uniti (Rome: Fazi Editore, 2003)
- "America and the Taliban: From Co-operation to War", Global Dialogue (Vol. 4, No. 2, Spring 2002) 7
- "Distortion, Deception and Terrorism: The Bombing of Afghanistan", International Socialist Review (No. 20, November/December 2001) pp. 36–44

== See also ==
- List of British Bangladeshis
