= The Severed Sun =

British horror film

- Film poster
- Directed by: Dean Puckett
- Screenplay by: Dean Puckett
- Produced by: Rebecca Wolff; Jude Goldrei
- Starring: Emma Appleton; Lewis Gribben; Toby Stephens; Barney Harris
- Cinematography: Ian Forbes
- Edited by: Paco Sweetman
- Music by: Brain Rays, James Forde Stewart and Thomas Michael Williams (Unknown Horrors)
- Production companies: BFI; BBC Film; iFeatures; Heatseeker Media; Lunar Lander Films; Grasp the Nettle Films
- Distributed by: Blue Finch Film Releasing
- Release dates: September 22, 2024 (Fantastic Fest); October 6, 2025 (United Kingdom)
- Running time: 80 minutes
- Country: United Kingdom
- Language: English

The Severed Sun is a 2024 British horror film that marks the feature debut of Dean Puckett. It is produced by Rebecca Wolff of Grasp the Nettle Films and Jude Goldrei of Lunar Lander Films. It stars Emma Appleton, Toby Stephens and Lewis Gribben.

The Severed Sun premiered at Fantastic Fest on September 22, 2024.

== Synopsis ==
A witch hunt takes its toll upon a small religious community following the unexplained death of a town member.

== Cast ==
- Emma Appleton as Magpie
- Toby Stephens as The Pastor
- Lewis Gribben as David
- Jodhi May as Andrea
- Barney Harris as John
- Oliver Maltman as Fred
- James Swanton as The Beast
- Eoin Slattery as Howard
- Zachary Tanner as Sam

== Production ==
=== Development ===
The film is loosely based on Puckett's 2018 short The Sermon. The film has developed slowly with Puckett keen to keep control of the project rather than cede to industry executives. The film has also been called I Feel Blood, Magpie, and The Heretic during its development. The film was developed as part of the BFI, BBC Film, and Creative UK's iFeatures program. The film has Rebecca Wolff of Grasp the Nettle Films and Jude Goldrei of Lunar Lander Films producing. The film was titled The Severed Sun when it received additional financing from newly the established Heatseeker Media for independent productions. It is set to be the first project delivered via the fund.

=== Filming ===
Filming took place on Bodmin Moor in Cornwall. Principal photography wrapped in June 2023.

=== Casting ===
The cast in 2021 was set to include Tuppence Middleton, Max Harwood, and Thomas Turgoose. By the 2023 production, the film featured Emma Appleton, Jodhi May, Lewis Gribben, Barney Harris, Oliver Maltman, James Swanton, and Toby Stephens.

== Release ==
Dark Sky Films released the film in the United States in theaters and on digital on 16 May 2025. The film had select Q&A screenings in the United Kingdom on 29 September, as well as a screening at the Exeter Phoenix on 3 October, before being released digitally in the country on 6 October, by Blue Finch Film Releasing.

== Reception ==
On the review aggregator website Rotten Tomatoes, 78% of 18 critics' reviews are positive.
