= Mint (TV series) =

British television series

- Genre: Crime drama
- Screenplay by: Charlotte Regan
- Directed by: Charlotte Regan
- Starring: Emma Laird; Lewis Gribben; Laura Fraser; Sam Riley; Lindsay Duncan; Ben Coyle-Larner
- Music by: Patrick Jonsson
- Country of origin: United Kingdom
- Original language: English
- No. of series: 1
- No. of episodes: 8

Production
- Executive producers: Theo Barrowclough; Jolyon Symonds; Tessa Ross; Juliette Howell; Charlotte Regan
- Producer: Angus Lamont
- Production companies: Fearless Minds; House Productions

Original release
- Network: BBC One
- Release: 20 April 2026 – present

Mint is a British crime drama series from Charlotte Regan for BBC One. The cast includes Emma Laird, Lewis Gribben, Laura Fraser, Sam Riley, Lindsay Duncan, and Ben Coyle-Larner. The series premiered on 20 April 2026 on BBC One.

== Cast and characters ==
- Emma Laird as Shannon
- Lewis Gribben as Luke
- Laura Fraser as Cat
- Sam Riley as Dylan
- Lindsay Duncan as Ollie
- Ben Coyle-Larner as Arran

== Production ==
Fearless Minds and House Productions produce the series which was commissioned by BBC One in February 2024. The eight-part series is written by Charlotte Regan. It is produced by Theo Barrowclough, Jolyon Symonds, Tessa Ross and Juliette Howell.

The cast was confirmed in March 2025 and filming began that month in Glasgow and Grangemouth in Scotland. It was distributed internationally by BBC Studios.

== Broadcast ==
The series premiered on 20 April 2026 on BBC One.
