= Barney Harris =

English actor (born 1996)

- Born: Barney Alexander Harris; 15 July 1996 (age 28); London, England, U.K.
- Education: Eton College
- Occupation: Actor, writer
- Years active: 2015 – present

Barney Alexander Harris (born 15 July 1996) is an English actor, writer and producer. He is best known for playing Mat Cauthon in season one of the Amazon Prime Video fantasy series The Wheel of Time.

== Early life and education ==
Harris was born in London to Jewish parents and educated at Eton College. He is the nephew of bookmaker Victor Chandler and great-grandson of William Chandler. He first discovered his passion for acting in a school production of Jerusalem, in which he played Johnny "Rooster" Byron, the role originated by Mark Rylance.

== Career ==
Harris made his television debut in the BAFTA-nominated BBC series The Hollow Crown, a series of television film adaptations of William Shakespeare's history plays. He appeared as Prince Edward opposite Benedict Cumberbatch and Sophie Okonedo.

His film debut was in Ang Lee's war drama Billy Lynn's Long Halftime Walk (2016) as an American soldier suffering with PTSD. The film stars Joe Alwyn, Kristen Stewart and Vin Diesel.

Following Lee's film, Harris appeared in the biographical crime drama Billionaire Boys Club (2018), opposite Ansel Elgort, Emma Roberts and Taron Egerton and in the BBC thriller Clique.

He was awarded a place on the UK Screen Stars of Tomorrow 2016 by Screen International, alongside Josh O'Connor and Florence Pugh. His first leading role came opposite FKA Twigs in Brighton Beach (2017).

In 2019, Harris was cast as Mat Cauthon in Amazon Prime Video's epic fantasy series The Wheel of Time, based on the novels by Robert Jordan. He was replaced by Dónal Finn for the second season. No official reason was given for the change, while critics praised his performance opposite Rosamund Pike in season 1. Forbes magazine stated "Barney Harris plays Mat Cauthon perfectly—both his charm and the darkness that begins to overtake him."

His next projects include the horror film The Severed Sun (2024); Desperate Journey, directed by Annabel Jankel; and the Netflix romantic-comedy film My Oxford Year, starring Sofia Carson and directed by Iain Morris.

== Filmography ==
=== Film ===
| Year | Title | Role | Notes |
|---|---|---|---|
| 2015 | All Roads Lead to Rome | Tyler | |
| 2016 | Billy Lynn's Long Halftime Walk | Sykes | |
| 2016 | Billionaire Boys Club | Izzy Samedi | |
| 2016 | Sweet Maddie Stone | Tike | short film |
| 2017 | Starboy | Yehud | short film, Best Actor Oxford Film Festival |
| 2017 | Brighton Beach | Danny | |
| 2017 | Melodie Saviour | Writer | short film |
| 2018 | A Brixton Tale | Charles | |
| 2018 | It's Me | He Aged 18 | |
| 2023 | Good Boy | Producer | |
| 2025 | The Severed Sun | John | |
| 2025 | A Desperate Journey | TBA | post production |
| 2025 | My Oxford Year | Ian | Netflix film |

=== Television ===
| Year | Title | Role | Notes |
|---|---|---|---|
| 2015 | The Hollow Crown | Prince Edward | 2 episodes |
| 2018–2019 | Clique | Barney | 6 episodes |
| 2021 | The Wheel of Time | Mat Cauthon | main role, season 1 |
