= Coveney =

Coveney may refer to:

- Coveney, Cambridgeshire, a village in Cambridgeshire, England, United Kingdom
- Ceara Coveney (born 1997), English actress
- Hugh Coveney (1935–1998), Irish politician
- John Coveney, Australian rugby league footballer
- Michael Coveney (born 1948), British theatre critic
- Patrick Coveney (1934-2022), Irish Roman Catholic prelate, papal nuncio to Greece
- Peter Coveney, physical chemist and science writer
- Simon Coveney (born 1972), Irish politician
