= The Wheel of Time (TV series) =

2021 American fantasy television series

- Genre: Action-adventure; Fantasy drama
- Based on: The Wheel of Time by Robert Jordan
- Developed by: Rafe Judkins
- Showrunner: Rafe Judkins
- Starring: See below
- Music by: Lorne Balfe
- Country of origin: United States
- Original language: English
- No. of seasons: 3
- No. of episodes: 24

Production
- Executive producers: Rafe Judkins; Rick Selvage; Larry Mondragon; Ted Field; Mike Weber; Darren Lemke; Marigo Kehoe; Sanaa Hamri
- Producer: Rosamund Pike
- Running time: 54–69 minutes
- Production companies: Radar Pictures; Iwot Pictures; Long Weekend; Little Island Productions; Amazon MGM Studios (Note: Credited as Amazon Studios for seasons 1 and 2); Sony Pictures Television (Note: Credited as Sony Pictures Television Studios for seasons 1 and 2)

Original release
- Network: Amazon Prime Video
- Release: November 19, 2021 – April 17, 2025

The Wheel of Time is an American fantasy television series developed by Rafe Judkins for Amazon Prime Video. The series is based on the book series of the same name by Robert Jordan. It features an ensemble cast led by Rosamund Pike.

The eight-episode first season premiered on Prime Video in November 2021. In May 2021, before the first season premiered, the series was renewed for a second season, which premiered in September 2023. The series was renewed for a third season in July 2022, over a year ahead of the debut of the second season. The third season premiered in March 2025. In May 2025, the series was canceled after three seasons.

The Wheel of Time received generally positive reviews from critics, and has been nominated for a Saturn Award.

== Premise ==
Moiraine Damodred, a member of the Aes Sedai, a powerful organization of women who can channel the One Power, seeks a group of four young people from the secluded village of Emond's Field in the Two Rivers, believing one of them is the reincarnation of the Dragon, an extremely powerful channeller responsible for the Breaking of the World. The Dragon Reborn is prophesied to either save the world from a primordial evil known as the Dark One or break it once more.

== Cast and characters ==
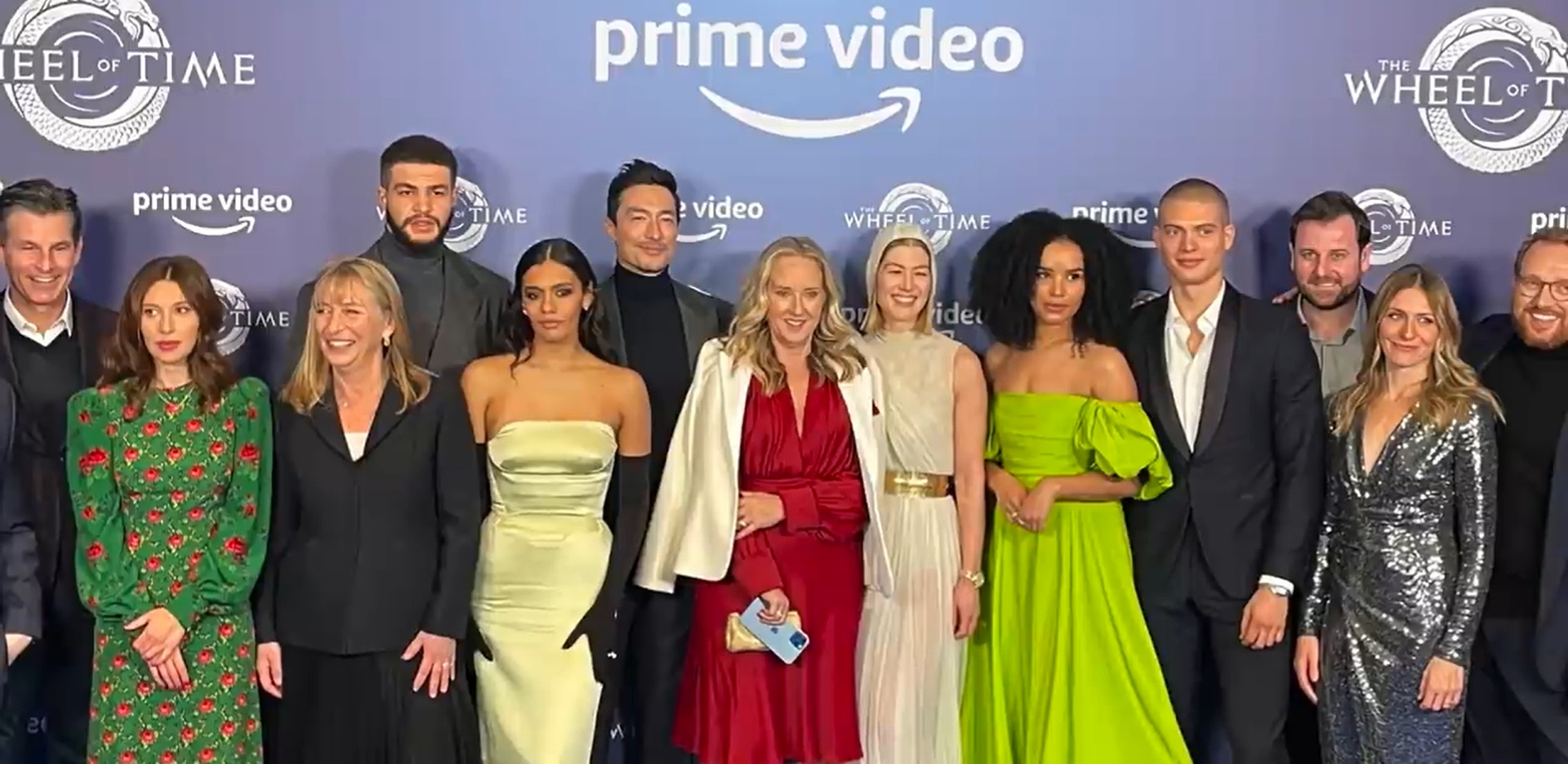
Cast at the 2021 London Premiere

=== Main ===
- Rosamund Pike as Moiraine Damodred, an Aes Sedai of the Blue Ajah who is searching for the Dragon Reborn
- Daniel Henney as al'Lan Mandragoran, Moiraine's Warder and companion
- Zoë Robins as Nynaeve al'Meara, the Wisdom, or healer, of Emond's Field
- Madeleine Madden as Egwene al'Vere, the daughter of the mayor of Emond's Field
- Josha Stradowski as Rand al'Thor, a shepherd from Emond's Field who comes to learn he is the Dragon Reborn
- Marcus Rutherford as Perrin Aybara, a blacksmith from Emond's Field
- Barney Harris (season 1) and Dónal Finn (season 2–3) as Mat Cauthon, a gambler from Emond's Field
- Kate Fleetwood as Liandrin Guirale, an Aes Sedai of the Red Ajah, later revealed to be Black Ajah
- Priyanka Bose as Alanna Mosvani, an Aes Sedai of the Green Ajah
- Hammed Animashaun as Loial, an Ogier who meets Rand in Tar Valon
- Sophie Okonedo as Siuan Sanche, the Amyrlin Seat, leader of the Aes Sedai
- Kae Alexander as Min Farshaw, a tavern keeper in Fal Dara who can see the Pattern
- Fares Fares as Ishamael (seasons 1–2; guest season 3), also known as Ba'alzamon, "the Betrayer of Hope" and "the Father of Lies", one of the Forsaken and the right hand of the Dark One
- Johann Myers as Padan Fain (season 2–3; recurring season 1), a traveling merchant and Darkfriend
- Álvaro Morte as Logain Ablar (season 2; recurring season 1), a male channeler claiming to be the Dragon Reborn
- Taylor Napier as Maksim (season 2–3; recurring season 1), one of Alanna's Warders
- Emmanuel Imani (season 2; recurring season 1) and Anthony Kaye (guest season 3) as Ihvon, one of Alanna's Warders
- Jennifer Cheon Garcia as Leane Sharif (season 2–3; guest season 1), an Aes Sedai and the Keeper of the Chronicles at the White Tower
- Meera Syal as Verin Mathwin (season 2–3), an Aes Sedai of the Brown Ajah who lives away from the White Tower
- Ceara Coveney as Elayne Trakand (season 2–3), the Daughter-Heir of the nation of Andor
- Natasha O'Keeffe as Lanfear (season 2–3), known as "the Daughter of the Night", a Forsaken who adopts the identity of Selene, an innkeeper in Cairhien, and develops a relationship with Rand
- Lindsay Duncan as Anvaere Damodred (season 2), a noblewoman in Cairhien and Moiraine's sister
- Jay Duffy as Dain Bornhald (season 2–3), a Whitecloak captain
- Ayoola Smart as Aviendha (season 2–3), an Aiel Maiden of the Spear who has left the Aiel Waste to search for the Car'a'carn, or prophesied leader of all Aiel clans
- Laia Costa as Moghedien (season 2–3), one of the Forsaken, also known as "the Spider"
- Olivia Williams as Morgase Trakand (season 3), the Queen of Andor and Elayne's mother
- Shohreh Aghdashloo as Elaida do Avriny a'Roihan (season 3), an Aes Sedai of the Red Ajah and chief advisor to Queen Morgase
- Isabella Bucceri as Faile Bashere (season 3), a Hunter of the Horn whom Perrin encounters in the Two Rivers.

=== Supporting ===
- Lolita Chakrabarti (season 1) and Rina Mahoney (season 3) as Marin al'Vere, Egwene's mother
- Michael Tuahine as Bran al'Vere (season 1), the innkeeper in Emond's Field and Egwene's father
- Michael McElhatton as Tam al'Thor (seasons 1–2), Rand's father, and a former soldier
- Naana Agyei Ampadu as Danya (season 1)
- Mandi Symonds as Daise Congar (seasons 1 & 3), a villager in the Two Rivers
- David Sterne (season 1) and Gregory Gudgeon (season 3) as Cenn Buie, a villager in the Two Rivers
- Juliet Howland as Natti Cauthon, Mat's mother
- Christopher Sciueref as Abell Cauthon (season 1), Mat's father
- Petr Simcák as Tom Thane (season 1)
- Litiana Biutanaseva as Bode Cauthon (seasons 1 & 3), Mat's sister
- Lilibet Biutanaseva as Eldrin Cauthon (seasons 1 & 3), Mat's sister
- Abdul Salis as Eamon Valda, a Whitecloak Questioner
- Stuart Graham as Geofram Bornhald (seasons 1–2), a Whitecloak captain
- Pearce Quigley as Master Hightower (season 1), a ferryman
- Alexandre Willaume as Thom Merrilin (seasons 1 & 3), a gleeman
- Clare Perkins as Kerene Nagashi (seasons 1 & 3), an Aes Sedai of the Green Ajah
- Izuka Hoyle as Dana (season 1), a barmaid
- Peter Franzén as Stepin (season 1), Kerene's Warder
- Daryl McCormack as Aram (seasons 1 & 3), a Tinker
- Narinder Samra as Raen (season 1), a Tinker
- Maria Doyle Kennedy as Illa (seasons 1 & 3), a Tinker
- Miguel Álvarez as the King of Ghealdan (season 1)
- Sandy McDade as Maigan (seasons 1–2), an Aes Sedai and Sitter of the Blue Ajah
- Guy Roberts as Uno Nomesta (seasons 1–2), a warrior of Shienar
- Amar Chadha-Patel (season 1) as Lord Yakota, a nobleman of Shienar
- Thomas Chaanhing as Lord Agelmar (season 1), ruler of Fal Dara
- Sandra Yi Sencindiver as Lady Amalisa (season 1), Lord Agelmar's sister
- Alexander Karim as Lews Therin Telamon (seasons 1–2), the Dragon who broke the world in attempting to seal away the Dark One
- Katie Brayben as Latra Posae Decume (seasons 1 & 3), an Aes Sedai of the Age of Legends
- Gregg Chilingirian as Ingtar Shinowa (season 2), a Shienaran warrior in command of the Shienarans hunting for the Horn of Valere
- Arnas Fedaravicius as Masema Dagar (season 2), a Shienaran warrior under Ingtar's command
- Gary Beadle as Elyas Machera (season 2), a tracker and wolfbrother
- Rima Te Wiata as Sheriam Bayanar (season 2), an Aes Sedai and Mistress of Novices in the White Tower
- Karima McAdams as High Lady Suroth (season 2), a Seanchan noblewoman who works for Ishamael
- Jessica Boone as Alwhin (season 2), a Seanchan woman serving Suroth
- Joelle as Joiya Byir (season 2–3), an Aes Sedai of the Gray Ajah and ultimately Black Ajah
- Julian Lewis Jones as Bayle Domon (season 2), a merchant and riverboat captain
- Heikko Deutschmann as Tomas (season 2), a Warder living with Verin and Adeleas
- Nila Aalia as Adeleas Mathwin (season 2–3), an Aes Sedai of the Green Ajah who lives with Verin and Tomas
- Daniel Francis as High Lord Turak (season 2), a high-ranking Seanchan nobleman in command of the Seanchan invasion
- Katie Leung as Yasicca (season 2), an Aes Sedai of the Brown Ajah, and a good friend of Verin
- Rachel Denning as Nyomi (season 2–3), an Aes Sedai of the Brown Ajah who is secretly part of the Black Ajah, and one of Liandrin's followers
- Will Tudor as Barthanes Damodred (season 2), a nobleman in Cairhien, and Anvaere's son
- Nyokabi Gethiaga as Ryma (season 2–3), an Aes Sedai of the Yellow Ajah
- Bentley Kalu as Basan (season 2), Ryma's Warder
- Xelia Mendes-Jones as Renna (season 2), a Seanchan sul'dam
- Hayley Mills as Gitara Moroso (season 2), an Aes Sedai who dies foretelling the rebirth of the Dragon to young Moiraine and Siuan
- Ragga Ragnars as Bain (season 2–3), an Aiel Maiden of the Spear
- Maja Simonsen as Chiad (season 2–3), an Aiel Maiden of the Spear
- Adrian Bouchet as Artur Hawkwing (season 2), a legendary king
- Luke Fetherston as Gawyn Trakand (season 3), a Prince of Andor and Elayne's elder brother
- Callum Kerr as Galad Damodred (season 3), a Prince of Andor and a skilled swordsman
- Nuno Lopes as Rahvin (season 3), a manipulative and powerful Forsaken masquerading as Lord Gaebril, Queen Morgase's consort and advisor
- Zenobia Kloppers as Amico Nagoyin (season 3), a member of the Black Ajah and a follower of Liandrin
- Olivia Popica as Jeaine Caide (season 3), a member of the Black Ajah and a follower of Liandrin
- Mi Hae Lee as Chesmal Emry (season 3), a member of the Black Ajah and a follower of Liandrin
- Olumide Olorunfemi as Ispan Shefar (season 3), a member of the Black Ajah and a follower of Liandrin
- Diêm Camille as Tsutama Rath (season 3), a sitter of the Red Ajah
- Cameron Jack as Sammael (season 3), a warmongering and aggressive Forsaken
- Nukâka as Bair (season 3), an Aiel Wise One and a dreamwalker
- Björn Landberg as Rhuarc (season 3), the chieftain of the Taardad clan and the husband of Bair
- Salóme Gunnarsdóttir as Melaine (season 3), an Aiel Wise One.
- Synnøve Macody Lund as Melindhra (season 3), a Malkieri woman raised by the Aiel
- Michael Lindall as Lord Luc (season 3), leader of a group of Hunters of the Horn in the Two Rivers
- Set Sjöstrand as Couladin (season 3), an Aiel warrior of the Shaido clan
- Natasha Culzac as Sevanna (season 3), an Aiel woman of great influence within the Shaido clan
- Judith Georgi as Sealdre (season 3), an Aiel Dreamwalker who lived after the Breaking ended
- Clare-Hope Ashitey as Alviarin Freidhen (season 3), an Aes Sedai of the White Ajah.
- Clare Dunne as Galina Casban (season 3), an Aes Sedai of the Red Ajah.

== Episodes ==
Season	Episodes	Originally released	
Season	Episodes	First released	Last released
1	8	November 19, 2021	December 24, 2021
2	8	September 1, 2023	October 6, 2023
3	8	March 13, 2025	April 17, 2025

=== Season 1 (2021) ===
The first season is based on The Eye of the World (1990), with elements from The Great Hunt (1990) and The Dragon Reborn (1991).

No. overall	No. in season	Title	Directed by	Written by	Original release date
1	1	"Leavetaking"	Uta Briesewitz	Rafe Judkins	November 19, 2021
Moiraine is an Aes Sedai, who can channel an elemental force called the One Power. Years past, the male half of the One Power was corrupted, driving male channelers insane, and Lews Therin Telamon, a channeler known as the Dragon, tore the world apart in his madness. Some Aes Sedai wish to eliminate male channelers, but Moiraine and her Warder Lan Mandragoran search for the Dragon's reincarnation to defeat the Dark One, a force of primordial evil. Their search leads them to the Two Rivers and four possible candidates—villagers Rand al'Thor, Perrin Aybara, Mat Cauthon, and Egwene al'Vere—whom they plan to take to the White Tower, the center of the Aes Sedai. Rand, besotted with Egwene, is disappointed that she intends to become the next Wisdom, a village leader and healer who cannot wed. Trollocs, beasts following the Dark One, ambush the Two Rivers. Nynaeve al'Meara, the current Wisdom, is taken, and Perrin accidentally kills his wife, Laila. Moiraine battles the Trollocs with the One Power and is injured. The four villagers reluctantly join Moiraine and Lan on their journey to keep the Trollocs away from their loved ones.
2	2	"Shadow's Waiting"	Uta Briesewitz	Amanda Kate Shuman	November 19, 2021
In a Whitecloak encampment, Eamon Valda burns an Aes Sedai. The Two Rivers villagers flee with Moiraine and Lan from pursuing Trollocs and a Fade. They flee across Taren's Ferry. To prevent the Trollocs from following, Moiraine uses the One Power to sink the ferry, incidentally killing the ferryman, disturbing the villagers. Along their journey, Egwene learns she has the potential to channel, Perrin encounters strange wolves, the villagers have disturbing dreams about the Dark One, and mistrust and tension between Moiraine and the villagers grow. Moiraine grows wearier and exhausted from her injury, and when Trollocs catch up, Lan makes the hasty decision to have them enter Shadar Logoth to escape. There the group is attacked by Mashadar, the evil darkness that inhabits the city. While they are separated and disoriented, Nynaeve is revealed to be alive and confronts Lan about the villagers.
3	3	"A Place of Safety"	Wayne Yip	The Clarkson Twins	November 19, 2021
Nynaeve escapes, outsmarts, and kills the Trolloc that captured her. The Two Rivers villagers are separated from Moiraine and each other, with Mat and Rand trekking across the wilderness in one direction, Egwene and Perrin in another, and an angry Nynaeve confronting Lan and an injured Moiraine, demanding to know the location of the villagers. Wolves follow Egwene and Perrin, who has a nightmare about the wolves and the Dark One. They find safety and rest with the Tuatha'an or Tinkers, a peaceful nomadic group. Mat and Rand argue about whether to go home or to the White Tower, with Mat showing darker tendencies that Rand dislikes. They encounter gleeman Thom Merrilin in a village, where he steals their gold but later rescues them from a Darkfriend. Nynaeve and Lan argue about the villagers and whether she should heal Moiraine. Eventually, Nynaeve concedes, using herbs to help the Aes Sedai while Lan scouts. Once Moiraine recovers enough to travel, they set out on the road and encounter Red sisters, including Liandrin, who have captured the self-proclaimed Dragon Reborn, Logain Ablar, a man who can channel the One Power.
4	4	"The Dragon Reborn"	Wayne Yip	Dave Hill	November 26, 2021
Moiraine is healed by the Aes Sedai and shown an imprisoned Logain, held by the continual channeling of several Aes Sedai. Liandrin and some Aes Sedai want to "gentle" Logain, permanently severing his connection to the One Power, but Moiraine believes he might be the Dragon Reborn. Egwene and Perrin travel with the Tinkers towards Tar Valon and learn that through "the Way of the Leaf" they have vowed never to use violence. Rand, Mat, and Thom stay the night with a rural family. Thom tells Rand that he suspects Mat may be able to channel, as his suspicious behavior resembles that of Thom's nephew Owyn, who could channel but killed himself after being gentled by Aes Sedai. That night, a Fade kills the family. Thom distracts it, allowing Rand and Mat to escape. Logain's army of followers arrives just as he uses the One Power to escape. Kerene Nagashi of the Green Ajah is killed protecting Moiraine and Liandrin from Logain's attack, while Lan's throat is slit. Nynaeve heals Lan and the injured Aes Sedai through a stunning display of the One Power. Liandrin and the Aes Sedai gentle Logain.
5	5	"Blood Calls Blood"	Salli Richardson-Whitfield	Celine Song	December 3, 2021
The Aes Sedai bury Kerene and Logain's army. Lan, Moiraine, Nynaeve, and the Aes Sedai travel to the White Tower of Tar Valon for a month. Moiraine warns Nynaeve of the Aes Sedai's political machinations. The Whitecloaks waylay Perrin, Egwene, and the Tinkers. With Aram's help, Perrin and Egwene initially escape, but are captured by Eamon Valda. Valda suspects Egwene can channel, torturing Perrin to force her to do so, but they escape when wolves attack the camp, seemingly connected to Perrin. Rand and Mat arrive at Tar Valon, where Rand continues to be disturbed by Mat's odd behavior. Rand meets Loial, an Ogier, who notes that Rand resembles a foreign Aiel and helps Nynaeve reunite with Mat and Rand. Logain is paraded around Tar Valon, laughing madly when he notices Rand and Mat watching. Lan and the other Warders console Stepin, Kerene's Warder. Moiraine and Alanna discuss Stepin's mental state, with Alanna warning Moiraine of Liandrin's motives and the impending return of the Amyrlin Seat. The following morning, Lan finds Stepin dead by suicide and serves as the primary mourner at his funeral, overcome with grief.
6	6	"The Flame of Tar Valon"	Salli Richardson-Whitfield	Justine Juel Gillmer	December 10, 2021
Siuan Sanche, the Amyrlin Seat, questions Liandrin for Logain's gentling and Moiraine for her 20 years of travel. Visiting Rand and Mat, Moiraine detaches Mat from the tainted dagger from Shadar Logoth. She has also found Egwene and Perrin. Maigan, a Blue Sitter, orders Moiraine to remain at the Tower, where she tries to hide her motives from Liandrin and asks Loial a favor. Moiraine and Siuan meet secretly, and the two lovers discuss their plan to find the Dragon Reborn. Moiraine takes a reunited Nynaeve and Egwene to meet the Amyrlin, where Egwene is awestruck and Nynaeve is suspicious. In the Hall of the Tower, Moiraine is exiled by Siuan in a ruse, allowing her to leave the Tower with the Two Rivers villagers. Moiraine gathers the villagers and Loial at a Waygate where they will travel to the Eye of the World to confront the Dark One and uncover who the Dragon Reborn is. Mat hesitates, so the other villagers, Loial, Moiraine, and Lan enter the Ways without him.
7	7	"The Dark Along the Ways"	Ciaran Donnelly	Amanda Kate Shuman & Katherine B. McKenna	December 17, 2021
The villagers who followed Moiraine into the Ways argue about returning for Mat but continue forward. Loial guides them along the Ways, which have been corrupted. The group encounters a Trolloc, which Egwene repels, but the One Power attracts Machin Shin (Black Wind), which provokes their deepest fears. Nynaeve repels Machin Shin with the Power, while Moiraine opens the Waygate to Fal Dara, to which they are followed by a man also in the Ways. Once there, they argue with Moiraine, who reveals whoever is not the Dragon would die if they reach the Eye of the World. Moiraine visits the seer Min Farshaw. Nynaeve and Lan (the heir to the lost kingdom of Malkier) have sex. Egwene and Rand reconcile. Rand recalls that Tam, who raised him, was present at the Battle of the Shining Walls and encountered a pregnant Maiden of the Spear, who died giving birth to Rand. In the Ways, Machin Shin taunted Rand that he is the Dragon, and he had channeled to escape both an earlier Darkfriend and the Trolloc. Rand and Moiraine leave Fal Dara to go to the Eye of the World, leaving the rest behind.
8	8	"The Eye of the World"	Ciaran Donnelly	Rafe Judkins	December 24, 2021
3000 years ago, the Amyrlin Seat warns Lews Therin Telamon of the dangers of his plan to imprison the Dark One. In the Blight, Moiraine gives Rand a sa'angreal, an ancient object to enhance his power to defeat the Dark One. At the Eye, Rand sees a vision of him and Egwene starting a family, which the Dark One tells him can come to fruition if he gives his power to the Shadow. The Dark One cuts Moiraine's connection to the One Power. As the Fal Dara army falls to an attack by thousands of Trollocs, five women – including Nynaeve and Egwene – channel against the attack and destroy the Trollocs. All but Egwene burn from excessive channeling. Egwene then heals Nynaeve. Perrin finds the Horn of Valere, which can summon history's greatest warriors. Padan Fain steals it, revealing he is a Darkfriend who visited the Two Rivers to find the five ta'veren. Rand resists the Dark One with the sa'angreal and fractures the unbreakable symbol he stood on. Fearing madness, Rand goes into hiding and asks Moiraine to remain secret. Lan finds Moiraine, who tells him this was not the Last Battle. In the west, great ships arrive, whose channellers generate powerful waves.

=== Season 2 (2023) ===
The second season is based on elements from both The Great Hunt and The Dragon Reborn.

No. overall	No. in season	Title	Directed by	Written by	Original release date
9	1	"A Taste of Solitude"	Thomas Napper	Amanda Kate Shuman	September 1, 2023
A group of Darkfriends meet, with Ishamael, the most powerful servant of the Dark One and one of the Forsaken, deciding to observe the Dragon Reborn, Rand Al'Thor, instead of killing him. Moiraine is staying with fellow Aes Sedai Adeleas and Verin, trying to gather information while dealing with the loss of her power. Meanwhile, Egwene and Nynaeve are training to become Aes Sedai in the White Tower. Egwene is determined to succeed but feels overlooked, while Nynaeve is struggling with a block that only allows her to channel when she is angry or afraid. Liandrin offers to train Nynaeve, but the other Aes Sedai are wary because Liandrin's previous teachings caused the deaths of novices. Perrin, Loial, and Elyas join a group of Shienarans led by Ingtar Shinowa to search for the Horn, which Padan Fain has stolen. Egwene and Nynaeve believe that Mat and Rand are dead, even though Liandrin has imprisoned Mat in the Tower at Moiraine's request and Rand is in hiding. Moiraine leaves to follow her plans alone but is attacked by three Fades. Lan tries to save her, but they are both injured. Verin and Adeleas intervene to rescue them.
10	2	"Strangers and Friends"	Thomas Napper	Katherine B. McKenna	September 1, 2023
Moiraine and Lan recover after the Fades' attack and prepare to leave for the White Tower, despite Moiraine's exile. While on their way there, Verin deduces that Moiraine found the Dragon Reborn and intends to serve him. Rand has gone into hiding at the Foregate in Cairhien, having been taken in by an innkeeper named Selene and begun a romantic relationship with her. He works at an asylum and manages to gain access to the False Dragon Logain, a patient there. At the White Tower, Liandrin pushes for Nynaeve to undergo testing to become Accepted, which would allow Liandrin, forbidden from teaching Novices, to train her. Alanna protests but leaves the Tower to aid Moiraine. Egwene befriends Elayne Trakand, the daughter-heir of Andor and newly arrived fellow Novice. Nynaeve follows Liandrin through a secret passage in the Tower and sees her caring for a sick man. Mat befriends Min, who Liandrin has also locked up; she has a vision of Mat spearing Rand, which she keeps to herself. Moiraine releases Lan from her service, claiming that he cannot protect her anymore, and has Alanna and her warders escort him to the Tower. Perrin and the Shienarans find the site of a massacre with a Fade nailed to a wall. They arrive at a small village, which is then attacked by a Seanchan force. Perrin, Loial, and the Shienarans are captured. The Seanchan leader Suroth arrives along with Ishamael.
11	3	"What Might Be"	Sanaa Hamri	John McCutcheon	September 1, 2023
Rand asks Logain to teach him how to control the One Power without going mad, but Logain agrees to help only if Rand brings him a bottle of Ghealdan wine, so Rand accompanies Selene to a party for Cairhienin nobles to get it. After Rand receives the wine, Logain reveals that the Power cannot be controlled. Later, Rand accidentally sets fire to Selene's inn with the One Power. Perrin and the Shienarans are commanded to swear fealty to the Seanchan. One of the Shienarans, Uno, refuses and is gruesomely executed, forcing the others to give in. Ishamael becomes interested in Perrin and encourages him to unleash his inner beast, but Elyas and a pack of wolves save him. Nynaeve undergoes her Accepted test, which involves facing trials inside ter'angreal Arches. However, she seemingly fails after choosing a life with Lan inside the Arches over becoming an Aes Sedai. Liandrin and the other Aes Sedai believe her to be dead, and Elayne has to comfort a grieving Egwene. Liandrin releases Mat, seemingly to comfort Egwene (which he opts not to do), but also has Min follow him. Inside the Arches, Nynaeve's life with Lan is ruined by a Trolloc attack, and she escapes back to the real world, where a shocked Egwene embraces her.
12	4	"Daughter of the Night"	Sanaa Hamri	Dave Hill	September 8, 2023
Moiraine arrives in Cairhien, where she meets Logain and offers to end his life if he first helps her train Rand. In the White Tower, Nynaeve has been raised as an Accepted following her trial in the Arches. Liandrin tells her of Perrin's capture by the Seanchan, provoking her, Egwene, and Elayne to sneak out of the tower to mount a rescue, only to be ambushed and captured by Liandrin. Perrin and Elyas look for the Shienarans and Loial. Perrin bonds with the wolf Hopper and learns that he is a Wolfbrother. Min is approached at an inn by Ishamael, who reveals that Liandrin works for him, and offers to rid her of her visions if she lures Mat to Cairhien. Alanna and her warders, who attempt to help Lan through his loss of the bond with Moiraine. Alanna finds a prophecy that reveals that the Forsaken Lanfear has returned to the world. Rand and Selene leave Cairhien for a trip to the countryside, where a Fade attacks them. Rand kills it with the One Power and confesses his love for Selene, who chooses to stay with him despite his ability to channel and reveals that she is also a channeler. Moiraine arrives, having been given Rand's location by her sister Anvaere, and stabs Selene, who she reveals is Lanfear. Rand and Moiraine flee as Lanfear starts to recover from seemingly mortal wounds.
13	5	"Damane"	Maja Vrvilo	Rohit Kumar	September 15, 2023
Perrin and Hopper leave Elyas to save Loial and the Shienarans. Perrin returns to the town where they were attacked, which has now been seized by Whitecloaks led by Dain Bornhald and Eamon Valda. Perrin saves Aviendha, a young Aiel woman they had imprisoned, and spares Bornhald's life in the ensuing battle. Aviendha pledges to help Perrin rescue the others as she owes him a life debt. Suroth is demoted for disobeying the orders of the Seanchan leader Turak. Ishamael gains Turok's favor by delivering him the Horn of Valere. Later, Suroth receives Nynaeve, Elayne, and Egwene as damane from Liandrin, who acts on Ishamael's orders. Elayne and Nynaeve escape and are taken in by Ryma, an Aes Sedai hiding in Falme while Egwene is left behind and is leashed. Verin arrives at the White Tower to investigate the disappearance of the three girls, leading her to evidence for the existence of the Black Ajah, Aes Sedai sworn to the Shadow. Rand and Moiraine escape Lanfear and take refuge with Anvaere and her son Barthanes. Moiraine has Rand enter Tel'aran'rhiod, the World of Dreams, hoping he might be able to learn Ishamael's aims. Rand is immediately captured in Tel'aran'rhiod by a waiting Lanfear.
14	6	"Eyes Without Pity"	Maja Vrvilo	Rammy Park	September 22, 2023
In the city of Falme, the sul'dam Renna employs physical and psychological torture in an attempt to break Egwene into a leashed damane. Damane are magic users in Seanchan society who spend their lives controlled by sul'dam through the use of an a'dam, a collar and leash made using the One Power. Meanwhile, Nynaeve and Elayne hide with Ryma in Falme and try to puzzle out how to open an a'dam. However, Nynaeve channels too much power during an attempt, alerting the Seanchan, who come for them. Ryma goes to fight the Seanchan alone to keep up the illusion of only one channeler and protect Elane and Nynaeve. Her warder is killed and she is captured as a damane. In Tel'aran'rhiod, Lanfear tries to convince Rand to join her by promising to protect him from Ishamael and showing him Egwene's location and dire circumstances. She also warns Rand that she will kill Moiraine if she sees them together. At the same time, Mat and Min arrive in Cairhien, and Rand and Mat meet in the Foregate to catch up. Rand tells Mat of Egwene's capture in Falme. However, Min warns Mat that Ishamael intends for him to go to Falme with Rand, where her vision shows him spearing Rand, causing Mat to avoid leaving with Rand by missing their meeting. Meanwhile, Siuan summons Moiraine for an audience after Lan warns her of Moiraine's actions. Rand is intercepted by Lan, Alanna, and her warders, who tell him they cannot let him leave.
15	7	"Daes Dae'mar"	Sanaa Hamri	Justine Juel Gillmer	September 29, 2023
Mat is kidnapped from Cairhien by Lanfear and taken to Ishamael in Falme. Ishamael gives him a tea that shows him visions of himself as a murderer. Nynaeve and Elayne figure out how to use the a'dam to capture a sul'dam after Loial tells them that only sul'dams can approach the kennels where Egwene is being held. Perrin and Aviendha meet two other Aiel warriors, Bain and Chiad, who join them on their journey to Falme. In Cairhien, Rand is captured by Siuan Sanche, who plans to use him as a weapon against the Dark One. Barthanes is exposed as a Darkfriend and given the task by Liandrin to kill Moiraine, but Anvaere discovers the plot and imprisons him. Lan learns from Logain that Ishamael did not cut off Moiraine's magic, but shielded it instead. Rand convinces Lanfear to help him get to Falme, and she attacks the Foregate to distract Siuan, enabling Moiraine and Lan to flee with Rand. Rand uses the One Power to cut the shield around Moiraine, allowing her to channel again. As they are about to leave Cairhien through a Waygate, Siuan confronts them but is attacked by Lanfear, who easily defeats her and opens the gate, allowing Rand, Moiraine, and Lan to depart for Falme.
16	8	"What Was Meant to Be"	Sanaa Hamri	Rafe Lee Judkins & Timothy Earle	October 6, 2023
Lanfear throws Moiraine and Lan out of the Ways outside of Falme. She transports herself and Rand into the city, where Rand kills Turak and his men; Ishamael learns of Rand's presence and realizes that this means Lanfear has betrayed him. Ishamael orders Padan Fain to deliver the cursed dagger from Shadar Logoth to Mat in an attempt to kill Rand, but Mat staves off the pull the dagger has on him and escapes craftily. The Whitecloaks, led by Dain and his father Geofram, attack Falme to try to eradicate the Seanchan. During the chaos, Ingtar, Loial, and Masema escape with the Horn of Valere and join the battle alongside Mat, Perrin, and the Aiel. Ingtar is killed. Egwene uses a second a'dam on Renna, forcing Renna to release her. Egwene then kills Renna by strangulation with the collar. Mat, backed into a corner, is forced to blow the Horn, summoning the Heroes of the Horn and turning the tide of the battle. Geofram kills Hopper, and Perrin, in a rage, kills Geofram. Rand, Egwene, Nynaeve, Perrin, and Mat reunite to confront Ishamael, who has Rand shielded from the One Power and tricks Mat into wounding Rand, fulfilling Min's prophecy. While Egwene and Perrin fight Ishamael, Moiraine frees Rand from the shield, allowing him to slay Ishamael, after which he is proclaimed the Dragon Reborn before the whole city. After the battle, Moghedien confronts Lanfear and informs her that all the Forsaken have been released.

=== Season 3 (2025) ===
The third season covers events from the fourth and fifth books, The Shadow Rising (1992) and The Fires of Heaven (1993).

No. overall	No. in season	Title	Directed by	Written by	Original release date
17	1	"To Race the Shadow"	Ciarán Donnelly	Justine Juel Gillmer	March 13, 2025
One month after the battle in Falme, Liandrin is summoned before the Hall of the White Tower, where Siuan exposes her as a member of the Black Ajah—Aes Sedai sworn to the Shadow. In support of Liandrin, several other sisters reveal themselves as Black Ajah, leading to a battle that results in many casualties, including one of Alanna's Warders, Ihvon. Liandrin and her group flee Tar Valon. Rand is expected to travel to Tear and claim Callandor, a legendary weapon intended for male channelers; but he resists. Egwene goes through the Arches and becomes an Accepted, but decides to follow Rand. At night, Moiraine allows Lanfear to covertly launch a series of attacks on the group, during which an unknown assassin nearly kills Nynaeve. When confronted, Lanfear reveals—to her shock—that the assassin, a Gray Man, was sent by another Forsaken. The next day, the group separates: Rand's party heads for the Aiel Waste, Perrin's group returns to the Two Rivers, while Nynaeve and Elayne remain in Tar Valon, as does Mat, who is plagued by foreign memories of the past. Elsewhere, Moghedien turns a captive Whitecloak into a Gray Man.
18	2	"A Question of Crimson"	Ciarán Donnelly	Katherine B. McKenna	March 13, 2025
In a flashback, Morgase Trakand, Elayne's mother, ruthlessly wins a succession war and ascends to the throne of Andor. In the present, she arrives at the White Tower, furious over Elayne's abduction and determined to take her home. Elayne, supported by Lord Gaebril, Morgase's consort, persuades Morgase otherwise. Morgase leaves behind her sons, Galad and Gawyn, as well as her advisor, Elaida—a Red Ajah with a strong rivalry with Siuan—at the Tower. Rand, Moiraine, Lan, Egwene, and Aviendha travel to the Aiel Waste, while both Egwene and Rand's dreams are constantly invaded by Lanfear. Egwene's nightmare leads her to a dream of Bair, an Aiel Wise One, before the group encounters Bair and her clan, the Taardad, at the outskirts of the Waste. In the Two Rivers, Perrin, Loial, Bain, and Chiad learn that the land is plagued by Trolloc attacks, and Whitecloaks, while hunting the monsters, occupy the Two Rivers. The group also meets Alanna and Maksim, who, mourning Ihvon's death, have sought refuge at the village. At the White Tower, Mat struggles with his past-life memories and learns the Aes Sedai cannot heal him. He also reconnects with Min, who now serves as Siuan's spy at the Tower.
19	3	"Seeds of Shadow"	Thomas Napper	Beverly Okhio	March 13, 2025
Lanfear meets her fellow Forsaken, Sammael and Rahvin—the latter, Lord Gaebril in disguise—to discuss a potential alliance. Unbeknownst to them, Rahvin is already in league with Moghedien. At the White Tower, Mat faces off against Galad and Gawyn in a duel, besting both princes with a simple quarterstaff. Siuan tasks Nynaeve and Elayne with hunting the Black Ajah. They fail to interrogate two captured Black sisters but discover a clue to Liandrin's whereabouts: her history with the city of Tanchico and an artifact stolen from the Tower similar to the Seanchan's a'dam. Nynaeve and Elayne set off to Tanchico with Mat, secretly followed by Min. Elaida tries to secure power for herself in the White Tower. In the Aiel Waste, Rand's group journeys to Rhuidean, an ancient city where Rand is prophesied to prove himself as the leader of the Aiel. In the Two Rivers, Perrin assumes leadership as the Whitecloaks, led by Dain Bornhald and Eamon Valda, look to arrest him for killing Dain's father, Geofram, in Falme. He also befriends Faile Bashere, who, along with Lord Luc, arrives at the village looking for the Horn of Valere. Liandrin and her group arrive in Tanchico, planning to assemble an artifact intended to enslave male channelers, which they plan to use on Rand, while Moghedien poses as their servant.
20	4	"The Road to the Spear"	Thomas Napper	Rafe Judkins	March 20, 2025
On the group's way to Rhuidean, Aiel Wise Ones suggest that Moiraine enter the city alongside Rand and take a trial that Wise Ones undergo. They also reveal that Aviendha, as a potential Wise One, must do the same. Aviendha reluctantly accepts her task, leaves, and ultimately passes her trial. Upon entering Rhuidean, Moiraine discovers Sakarnen, the female counterpart to Callandor, and begins the trial, during which she experiences multiple alternate futures where either she or Rand dies. During Rand's trial, he relives the lives of his ancestors, learning the history of the Aiel—during the Age of Legends, they were servants of the Aes Sedai who were sworn to pacifism and were sent to find a "place of safety" to protect Sakarnen after the Breaking of the World, but eventually broke their oaths, splitting up and becoming the warrior nation they are today. In the most distant memory, Rand sees Lanfear, an Aes Sedai scientist, as she drills a bore through reality, giving the Dark One access to the world. Rand passes the trial, receiving two dragon tattoos that mark him as the leader of the Aiel, and carries a half-conscious Moiraine out of Rhuidean.
21	5	"Tel'aran'rhiod"	Marta Cunningham	Ajoke Ibironke	March 27, 2025
At the White Tower, Siuan and Verin lay a trap for Elaida—who threatened to call a vote against the Dragon—to expose her as Black Ajah. She's attacked and nearly killed by a Gray Man, but Siuan and Leane save her. Just before reaching Tanchico, Nynaeve, Elayne, and Mat team up with Min, who is familiar with the city. Mat also discovers that Min foresaw his death by hanging in her visions. In the Two Rivers, Perrin, Faile, and the Aiel infiltrate the Whitecloak camp to rescue Mat's family, held captive there, leading to a battle. Alanna aids them and is nearly killed by Whitecloaks, but Maksim saves her. They save Mat's sisters, but his mother is burned at a stake by Valda. In the Aiel Waste, the group arrives at the home of the Taardad clan, and Aviendha begins shadowing Rand and teaching him about the Aiel culture as part of her Wise One training. Egwene practices walking in Tel'aran'rhiod, the World of Dreams, with the Wise Ones. Moiraine reveals to Lan what she saw in Rhuidean and, with Egwene's assistance, meets Siuan in a dream to warn that the Tower must follow Rand, not control him. In Rand's dream, Lanfear confesses her love for him, and they share a kiss, witnessed by Egwene, who's visiting the dreams of her loved ones.
22	6	"The Shadow in the Night"	Marta Cunningham	Rammy Park	April 3, 2025
In a flashback, teenage Liandrin kills her husband and escapes captivity with her newborn before being offered help by Ishamael. In the present, Liandrin kills Nyomi, one of her Black Ajah, on Lanfear's orders, while Moghedien kills another who was spying for Rhavin. Nynaeve, Elayne, Mat and Min scout Tanchico for clues on the Black Ajah and the artifact that could enslave a male channeler. Mat finds one of its parts, but Moghedien steals it from Nynaeve and Elayne after putting them under compulsion to extract information from them. The group also encounter Thom Merrilin, the gleeman who saved Rand and Mat from a Fade earlier. In the Aiel Waste, Egwene is confronted by Lanfear in Tel'aran'rhiod, while Rand and Moiraine discuss their next steps after Rhuidean. Later, Egwene and Rand have an emotional argument about Rand's relationship with Lanfear, but they are interrupted by an attack from Sammael and Aiel darkfriends. They defeat the attackers, but a young Aiel girl dies. Rand attempts to resurrect her with the One Power, but fails. In the Two Rivers, Perrin and Alanna recover from their injuries, while Padan Fain brings more Trollocs through the Ways. Posing as a Whitecloak, he allies with Dain, with the latter being unaware of his true nature.
23	7	"Goldeneyes"	Ciarán Donnelly	Dave Hill	April 10, 2025
Perrin, Alanna, Maksim, Bain, Chiad, and Faile assist the villagers of the Two Rivers in preparing for an imminent Trolloc attack while also accepting refugees from other regions, including Aram and the Tinkers. Perrin seeks help from the Whitecloaks, but Dain turns him down, even though Perrin offers to surrender himself to him in return. As the battle commences, Perrin and Maksim lead the charge, while Alanna and the village's channelers attack from a distance. After the invaders seem to retreat, Alanna is ambushed and severely wounded, and more Trollocs and Darkfriends force the villagers behind the walls. Aram kills a trolloc in self-defense, breaking the Way of the Leaf. Dain suddenly arrives with the Whitecloaks to help, having changed his mind. Padan Fain turns on him and lets his Trollocs through the gate. In the chaos, Valda attempts to kill the wounded Alanna, but is incinerated by Mat's sisters, who are able to channel. Meanwhile, Loial, Bain, and Chiad head to the nearby Waygate to prevent more Trollocs from entering. Unable to close the Waygate, Loial sacrifices himself to destroy it. Perrin defeats Fain but shows him mercy, compelling him to recall his army. Keeping his promise, Perrin allows himself to be arrested by Dain while the villagers proclaim him the Lord of the Two Rivers.
24	8	"He Who Comes with the Dawn"	Ciarán Donnelly	Justine Juel Gillmer	April 17, 2025
Nynaeve, Mat, Elayne, Min, and Thom enter the palace in Tanchico in search of the artifact. Elayne and Thom are attacked by one of the Black Ajah, but Elayne kills her. Stepping through an arch, Mat is transported to a mysterious realm where an Eelfinn, a fox-like creature, grants him three wishes and in exchange hangs him from the arch. Min saves Mat, but he finds he has lost some memories. Nynaeve faces off with Liandrin and overcomes her channeling block after Liandrin nearly kills her. Liandrin gets away with the artifact and makes a deal with Moghedien to enslave Rand. In the White Tower, Elaida effects a coup and is declared the Amyrlin Seat. Siuan is falsely condemned as a Darkfriend and executed. In the Aiel Waste, Moiraine plans to force an imprisoned Sammael to train Rand in channeling, but Sammael is murdered by Moghedien. Rand rejects Lanfear, prompting her to turn against him, ally with Rhavin, and position Couladin, leader of the Shaido clan, as a fake Car'a'carn. Moiraine and Lan fight Lanfear, with Moiraine emerging wounded but victorious and Lanfear, severely wounded, fleeing. Rand convinces the Aiel to follow him by revealing their history as oathbreakers and summoning rain in the dry Waste.

== Production ==
=== Background ===
In 2000, NBC optioned the screen rights to Robert Jordan's fantasy novel series The Wheel of Time but did not ultimately proceed with the production. In 2004, Jordan sold the film, television, video game, and comic rights to the series to production company Red Eagle Entertainment. In 2015, Red Eagle Entertainment paid air time to cable network FXX to air Winter Dragon, a 22-minute pilot for a potential The Wheel of Time series starring Billy Zane and Max Ryan that allowed Red Eagle to hold on to the rights to the project. Subsequently, the company sued Jordan's widow, Harriet McDougal, for her comments about the pilot; the lawsuit was settled in 2016. In April 2016, McDougal announced that a major studio was undergoing contract negotiations for production on a TV series.

=== Development ===
A new adaptation of the series was announced on April 20, 2017, produced by Sony Pictures Television in association with Red Eagle Entertainment and Radar Pictures. Rafe Judkins was expected to serve as showrunner for the series and executive produce alongside Rick Selvage, Larry Mondragon, Ted Field, Mike Weber, Lauren Selig and Darren Lemke. McDougal was set to serve as a consulting producer. By October 2018, the series had been in development for a year, and Amazon Studios had agreed to produce it. In January 2019, Judkins announced that two additional writers, Michael and Paul Clarkson, had joined the production's writing team. By April 2019, Kelly Valentine Hendry had been attached as casting director.

In June 2019, it was announced that Rosamund Pike, who portrays Moiraine Damodred, would also serve as a producer. Brandon Sanderson, who had completed the book series following Robert Jordan's death, was also confirmed to be serving as consulting producer along with McDougal. On various occasions, Sanderson wrote about his contributions to the production, which he described as "reading the scripts and offering feedback directly to Rafe, the showrunner". Judkins has said that Maria Simons, a long-time editorial assistant to Robert Jordan and McDougal, also provides feedback on scripts. The lead characters from Emond's Field were written as older than their book counterparts. The production team thought that television shows with seventeen-year-old lead characters could feel like young adult fiction, which was not a genre they felt was suitable for the series.

Uta Briesewitz was confirmed as the director of the first two episodes in February 2019. Salli Richardon-Whitfield was confirmed to be directing episodes five and six in November 2019, and Wayne Yip was confirmed to be directing episodes three and four in December. The director of episodes seven and eight, Ciaran Donnelly, was revealed in February 2020.

On May 20, 2021, Amazon renewed the series for a second season ahead of the series premiere. The script for the second season's first episode was posted in May 2021, six months before the series' premiere. Thomas Napper, Maja Vrvilo, and Sanaa Hamri have been reported to be directing episodes of the second season, with Hamri directing half of the season and serving as an executive producer. The second season combined elements from both The Great Hunt (1990) and The Dragon Reborn (1991), the second and third books in the series.

On July 21, 2022, ahead of the second-season premiere, Amazon renewed the series for a third season. The third season covers the fourth and fifth books, The Shadow Rising (1992) and The Fires of Heaven (1993). On May 23, 2025, Amazon Prime Video canceled the series after three seasons.

=== Casting ===
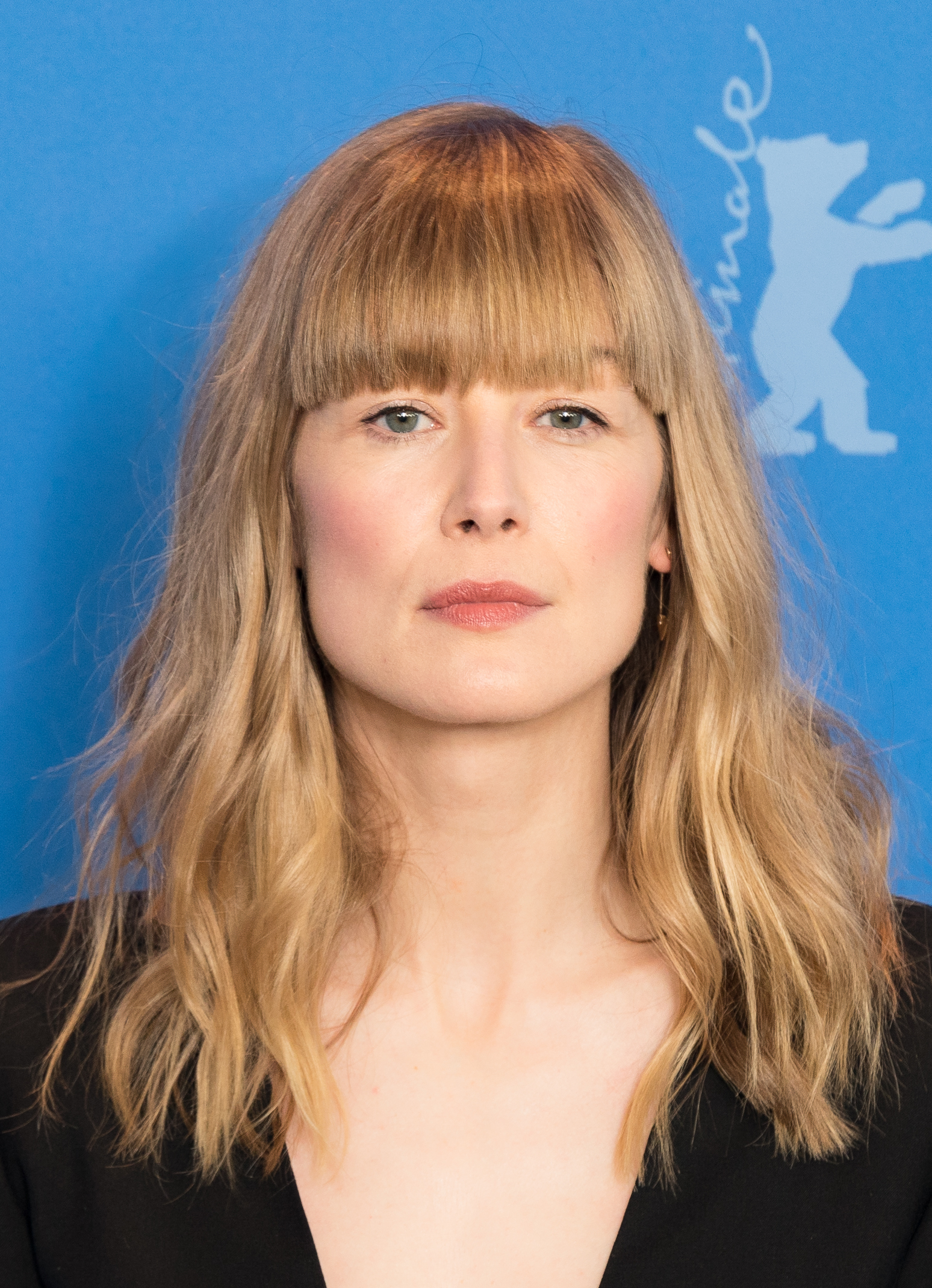
Rosamund Pike stars as Moiraine Damodred.

Rosamund Pike was cast as the lead Moiraine in June 2019. Further main cast members were announced in August 2019: Daniel Henney as Lan Mandragoran, Josha Stradowski as Rand al'Thor, Marcus Rutherford as Perrin Aybara, Zoë Robins as Nynaeve al'Meara, Barney Harris as Mat Cauthon, and Madeleine Madden as Egwene al'Vere. Michael McElhatton was announced to be playing Tam al'Thor in early November 2019. Irish actor Daryl McCormack was said to have been cast in an undisclosed role in mid-November 2019, later revealed to be the role of Aram. Several more main cast members were announced in December 2019: Alexandre Willaume as Thom Merrilin, Johann Myers as Padan Fain, Hammed Animashaun as Loial, Alvaro Morte as Logain Ablar, Priyanka Bose as Alanna Mosvani, Taylor Napier as Maksim, and Emmanuel Imani as Ivhon.

In January 2020, Kate Fleetwood posted on her Instagram page that she had been cast to play the role of Liandrin Guirale. In March 2020, Jen Cheon Garcia announced that she had been cast as Leane Sharif. In June 2020, eight additional roles were announced: Lolita Chakrabarti as Marin Al'Vere, Michael Tuahine as Bran Al'Vere, David Sterne as Cenn Buie, Christopher Sciueref as Abell Cauthon, Juliet Howland as Natti Cauthon, Mandi Symonds as Daise Conger, Abdul Salis as Eamon Valda, and Stuart Graham as Geofram Bornhald. In July 2020, Darren Clarke was revealed to be playing the role of Basel Gill. That same month, Maria Doyle Kennedy and Narinder Samra were cast as Illa and Raen, respectively. Sophie Okonedo as Siuan Sanche, Kae Alexander as Min Farshaw, Peter Franzen as Stepin, and Clare Perkins as Kerene Nagashi were all announced in August 2020.

In September 2021, it was announced that Barney Harris would not be returning for the second season and that Dónal Finn would be playing the role of Mat going forward. In October 2021, Ceara Coveney, Natasha O'Keeffe and Meera Syal joined the cast as series regulars for the second season, with Coveney confirmed to be playing the role of Elayne Trakand. In December 2021, three recurring cast members were announced: Guys Roberts as Uno Nomesta, Arnas Fedaravicius as Masema Dagar, and Gregg Chillingirian as Ingtar Shinowa. The role of Ingtar was originally to be played by Amar Chadha-Patel, but due to scheduling conflicts his role was changed to "Lord Yakota". Thomas Chaanhing was confirmed for the role of Lord Agelmar and Sanra Yi Sencindiver was confirmed for the role of Lady Amalisa. In April 2022, it was announced that Ayoola Smart would play the role of Aviendha.

In December 2024, it was reported that Shohreh Aghdashloo would be portraying Elaida a'Roihan in season three. The casting of Olivia Williams as Morgase Trakand, Luke Fetherston as Gawyn Trakand, Callum Kerr as Galad Trakand, and Nuno Lopes as Lord Gaebril was announced later that month.

=== Filming ===
==== Season 1 ====
Table reads with the cast had begun by early October 2019. Principal photography for the first season started on September 16, 2019. Filming in Prague was halted in March 2020 due to the COVID-19 pandemic but had resumed by April 2021 and concluded in May 2021. Jordan Studios in Prague, constructed for the production, served as the primary production base. Other filming locations included parts of the Czech Republic; Dubrovnik, Croatia; Segovia, Spain; Slovenia; and the Canary Islands. Judkins has said that shooting in the Canary Islands was intended to be more extensive, but "because of COVID-19 we were not able to do that. It had been scouted, so we sent our drone and visual effects teams to build where we were going to go into a 3D digital world that we could then put our actors into." In a behind-the-scenes video, Ciaran Donnelly, who directed the first-season finale, said that scenes taking place in the Blight were supposed to be shot on Gomera, but COVID restrictions prevented traveling there. He credited production designer Ondrej Nekvasil with designing an artificial forest that could be built in Jordan Studios as a replacement.

Filming in the Czech Republic qualified the production for the Czech Film Fund's incentive program, making available CZK 352 million (US $16.3 million) in incentives. Executive producer Marigo Kehoe said that "For us shooting here in the Czech Republic was the only choice". Filming in Slovenia similarly qualified the production for tax incentives of $314 thousand. Prague's Z Molu Es Kennel provided wolfdogs for the production between October 2019 and February 2020.

==== Season 2 ====
Filming for the second season began on July 19, 2021, and filming in Prague was scheduled to conclude by February 2022. Jindřichův Hradec, Calanchi Di Aliano, Ginosa, Letohrádek Hvězda, Barrandov Studios, CLA Studios in Ouarzazate, Morocco, Masseria Lo Spagnulo, Masseria Borzone, and Chateau Karlova Koruna were reported as filming locations, along with Jordan Studios in Prague. More than 500 of the production crew's 600 members are reported to be residents of the Czech Republic.

==== Season 3 ====
Filming for the third season began on April 17, 2023, in Czechia and South Africa. Filming concluded on March 22, 2024.

=== Music ===
Showrunner Rafe Judkins said that for the soundtrack he "did not want to be what the cliché is, i.e., typical, what one would expect of that genre". Composer Lorne Balfe instead referred to "a big hot pot of different styles" such as Balinese, Celtic, Southern, and Cajun, feeling that it was important to give the soundtrack more modern touches and "not to make it just traditional 'medieval folk music'". In incorporating the fictional language "Old Tongue" into the soundtrack, Balfe worked with a dialect and language coach to ensure lyrics were grammatically correct and had them written out phonetically for singers. He said that "when watching the show the vocals are the narrative of the scene... They're to do with actually supporting the storyline of the scene and the character's development."

The first of four albums for the first season, titled "The First Turn", was released on November 12, 2021, by Milan Records in digital, CD, and vinyl formats. The album contained fourteen tracks that were largely conceptual but contained key themes that spawned variations in the final score. Balfe said that "The score to this series is a re-imagination of fantasy music, doing away with the genre's reliance on large, traditional orchestras in favor of more modern colors while retaining the strong melodies and bold harmonies that fans can expect from such an epic."

On January 12, 2022, Balfe confirmed that he would be returning to score the second season. The Wheel of Time: Season 2, Volume 1 was released on September 8, 2023, and The Wheel of Time: Season 2, Volume 2 was released on September 22, 2023.

=== Visual effects ===
In early 2020, Julian Perry was attached to the series as Overall Visual Effects Supervisor. Special effects company Cinesite was revealed to be working on the visual effects of the series in April 2020. Additional VFX work was done by MPC Episodic, Outpost VFX, Automatik VFX, Union VFX, RISE, DNEG, Framestore, Scanline, Zelda VFX, and Ombrium VFX. In an interview, Perry discussed how the challenging nature of the show and a more limited post-production period resulting from the 2020 production halt required them to work with a large number of VFX studios to "help spread workload".

== Release ==
The series premiered on the streaming service Amazon Prime Video on November 19, 2021, with the first three episodes available immediately and the rest debuting on a weekly basis. The first two episodes premiered in theaters in London, UK, and select cities across the US on November 15, 2021, ahead of the streaming release of the first three episodes. The series was the most-watched Prime Video premiere of 2021 and among the most-watched Prime Video premieres on record; the premiere was also the most-pirated television program of the week. The series had "the greatest average audience demand in the US in the first 30 days after its premiere of any new series" in 2021. According to Nielsen, the first season accumulated 4.91 billion viewing minutes, making it the second-most watched season of a Prime Video original series on Nielsen's records.

The first volume in the book series, The Eye of the World, saw a spike in sales that has been attributed to the series release. For the week of November 28, 2021, it was the second-most sold book across all formats on Amazon.com. It also made the January 2022 The New York Times Best Seller list in the mass market fiction category list and was number one on the audio fiction list.

The second season premiered on September 1, 2023. The third season premiered on March 13, 2025.

== Reception ==
=== Critical reception ===
For the first season, review aggregator Rotten Tomatoes reports an 81% approval rating and an average rating of 7.0/10, based on 94 reviews. The critics' consensus reads, "The Wheel of Time's revolutions can be a bit creaky as it tries to stand out from other fantasy series, but it succeeds admirably in making Robert Jordan's epic approachable for the uninitiated." Metacritic, which uses a weighted average, assigned a score of 55 out of 100 based on 24 critics, indicating "mixed or average reviews".

For the second season, Rotten Tomatoes reports a score of 86% and an average rating of 7.45/10, based on 48 reviews. The consensus reads, "The Wheel of Time keeps spinning on a steady track in a rousing second season that deepens its characters." On Metacritic, the season holds a score of 67 out of 100 based on 10 critics, indicating "generally favorable reviews".

For the third season, Rotten Tomatoes reports a score of 97% and an average rating of 7.85/10, based on 65 reviews. The consensus reads, "Growing more confident in its execution while putting its best elements front and center, The Wheel of Time's third season is its best yet." On Metacritic, the season holds a score of 77 out of 100 based on nine critics, indicating "generally favorable reviews".

Ed Power of The Daily Telegraph gave the series 4 out of 5, writing: "In its early episodes this big Wheel has enough sweep, mystique and momentum to suggest that it can keep on turning and give Amazon the global hit it dearly craves." Keith Phipps of TV Guide gave the series 4 out of 5, writing: "Most importantly, it works as a piece of storytelling, creating an elaborate fictional universe but also reasons for viewers to care about that universe's fate and intrigue about what happens next." Lucy Mangan of The Guardian gave the series 3 out of 5, writing: "It's absolutely fine. It's got brio, it's got style and it's got enough portentous voiceover book-ending events to make everything feel high stakes." John Doyle of The Globe and Mail wrote that the series had "a certain charm in its depiction of ordinary people living in this beautiful but fraught place", but criticized it for what he described as "an overreliance on special effects and spectacle, to the point where you'd rather get back to the people involved". Preeti Chhibber of Polygon stated, "The Wheel of Time is a very strong start to a much-awaited series and created by someone who has a clear understanding of how adaptations can soar when complementing their source material rather than just copying it." Mini Anthikad Chhibber of The Hindu described watching the first two episodes of the series as "a fun experience", and praised the visuals and action.

Alan Sepinwall of Rolling Stone gave the series 2 out of 5, praising the show's visuals and writing that it "may bring in some fantasy fans starved for any morsel of magic and wonder", but added: "the whole thing is empty, if expensive, calories". Fiona Sturges of the Financial Times gave the series 2 out of 5, writing: "While there is enough violence and faux-mysticism to keep genre fans happy, convincing human interactions are harder to find." Chancellor Agard, writing for Entertainment Weekly, noted a lack of character development despite the series' overall watchability. Variety criticized the series for speeding through too much story. Brian Lowry of CNN described the series as "Amazon's poor-man's version of The Lord of the Rings", and wrote: "the characters simply don't possess enough pop to draw in those who don't come immersed in the mythology, and the special effects are uneven."

Writing about the second season, Helen O'Hara of Empire gave the season 4 out of 5, remarking that "the cast seem more comfortable now and the stakes ever higher in a smart, complicated adaptation that is taking worthwhile risks, while still holding on to what fans love about the books." Carly Lane, writing for Collider, gave the season 4 out of 5 and stated that "The Wheel of Time Season 2 continues to embrace the riches of its source material's lore and worldbuilding, diverting from the books when it makes the most sense to but never sacrificing depth of character and overarching plot." Following the season finale, Kathryn VanArendonk of Vulture wrote that "In its second season, the Amazon fantasy series Wheel of Time, based on the unending Robert Jordan novels that start out like a Lord of the Rings rip-off, is a TV series that has figured itself out."

As of July 2025, The Wheel of Time maintained strong audience engagement, with demand measured at approximately 27.8 times that of the average U.S. television series, according to Parrot Analytics.

=== Accolades ===
Awards and nominations received by The Wheel of Time
Year	Award	Category	Recipient(s)	Result	Ref.
2022	Saturn Awards	Best Streaming Fantasy Series	The Wheel of Time	Nominated	
2022	BAFTA Television Craft Awards	Special, Visual & Graphic Effects	Production team	Nominated	
2022	Hugo Awards	Best Dramatic Presentation, Short Form	Rafe Judkins, Dave Hill (for "The Flame of Tar Valon")	Nominated	
2022	Actors and Actresses Union Awards	Best Actor in an International Production	Álvaro Morte	Nominated	
2022	Irish Film & Television Awards	Best Director – Drama	Ciaran Donnelly	Nominated	
2022	Dragon Awards	Best Science Fiction or Fantasy TV Series	Rafe Judkins	Nominated	
2022	ReFrame Stamp	Gender-balanced hiring for Season 1	Production team	Won	
2024	ReFrame Stamp	Gender-balanced hiring for Season 2	Production team	Won	
2025	ARFF Pride Awards	Best Actress in a Series	Rosamund Pike	Nominated	
2025	ARFF Pride Awards	Best Supporting Actress in a Series	Sophie Okonedo	Nominated	
2025	Golden Trailer Awards	Best Fantasy Adventure (Trailer/Teaser) for a TV/Streaming Series	Amazon MGM Studios / Wild Card Creative Group (for "Season 3: Heroes")	Nominated	

=== Cancellation ===
The Wheel of Time was canceled in May 2025, after three seasons, with Amazon citing high production costs and viewership trends as contributing factors.

A global fan campaign titled #SaveWoT was subsequently launched to advocate for the continuation of the series. The movement included an online petition that garnered over 200,000 signatures, as well as crowdfunding efforts that funded digital billboards in cities including New York, London, and São Paulo. In June 2025, fans also flew an airplane banner over Amazon Studios' headquarters in Culver City. A fan-organized choir performance advocating for the show's renewal also took place outside Culver City Studios and was featured on the front page of the Culver City News. The campaign received coverage from several media outlets, and some cast members, including Pike, expressed public support for continuing the series. Outlets such as The Express Tribune reported that viewers expressed their disappointment across social media platforms, with some users threatening to cancel their Prime Video subscriptions in protest.

A number of media outlets and fans expressed concern over the timing and handling of the cancellation decision. According to The Verge, the third season of The Wheel of Time received some of the strongest critical reception of the series, yet was not renewed. Screen Rant reported that the cancellation also halted development of a potential prequel film trilogy based on the Age of Legends period, which had previously been discussed by showrunner Judkins.

Judkins stated he had not received a clear explanation for the cancellation and indicated the production team was "sad and uncertain" but hopeful the series "might find another home". Author Brandon Sanderson, who completed the original novels after Robert Jordan's death and served as a consulting producer on the series, said he "heard nothing for two months" prior to learning of the cancellation alongside the public. He described it as "a shame", stating that although he "had [his] problems with the show, it had a fanbase who deserved better than a cancellation after the best season". Sanderson also noted that his involvement was nominal, adding that he "won't miss being largely ignored" by the production team.

== Animated shorts ==
Six animated "Origins" shorts were released alongside the release of the first season which provide additional context about the show's fictional world. These three-minute videos are titled "The Breaking of the World", "The Fall of Manetheren", "The Greatest Warder", "Saidar, Saidin, Stone", "The White Tower", and "An Ogier's Longing". These shorts were written by Rammy Park and directed by Dan DiFelice with Judkins, Craig Muller, and Mike Weber serving as executive producers. Rupert Degas, Ida May, Steven Hartley, and Evelyn Miller served as narrators.

In writing the episodes, Park wanted each to be focused on concepts that tied in thematically with the main show, might be of interest to series newcomers, and that long-time readers of the books might like to see visually. After Muller and Weber approved each script, Judkins gave the final approval, ensuring that an episode did not spoil information the writers intend the main show to convey later on. Director Dan DiFelice said that he wanted to take full advantage of the animated medium and not "just take live action and paint over it", and that he wanted to capture a "certain grittiness, mood, and texture" in the art style and direction. His team consisted of a "huge team from MPC but then all these freelancers, globally".

During a panel at San Diego Comic-Con 2022, it was announced that more episodes of Origins would be released starting in August 2022. The first of these was to be focused on the character of Lan Mandragoran.
