= Generation Z (TV series) =

2024 British television series

- Written by: Ben Wheatley
- Directed by: Ben Wheatley
- Starring: Sue Johnston; Robert Lindsay; Lewis Gribben; Paul Benthall; Anita Dobson; Jay Lycurgo; Buket Komur; Viola Prettejohn; Johnny Vegas
- Country of origin: United Kingdom
- Original language: English
- No. of series: 1
- No. of episodes: 6

Production
- Executive producers: Ben Wheatley; Beth Willis
- Producers: Byron Archard; Alex Kazamia
- Production companies: The Forge; ZDF; All3Media

Original release
- Network: Channel 4
- Release: 13 October 2024

Generation Z is a 2024 British comedy horror television series, made for Channel 4 by Ben Wheatley, and featuring an ensemble cast.

In March 2025, Channel 4 cancelled the series after one season.

== Synopsis ==
An army truck overturns outside a care home in the fictional town of Dambury. The subsequent chemical leak seems to turn the OAP residents into zombies, attacking younger people from the town.

== Cast ==
- Viola Prettejohn as Finn, an outcast teenage girl who sets out to investigate the infection.
- Lewis Gribben as Steff, an anxious teenage boy who teams up with Finn who has feelings for him.
- Jay Lycurgo as Charlie, Steff's best friend and Kelly's boyfriend.
- Buket Kömür as Kelly, Charlie's girlfriend and Janine's granddaughter.
- Sue Johnston as Cecily, an elderly woman who is one of the first to be exposed to the Salvepurian virus.
- Robert Lindsay as Morgan, a scientist who secretly created Salvepurian and tries to stop it from spreading.
- Paul Benthall as Frank, an elderly man who becomes infected alongside Cecily. He is also Cecily's temporary love interest.
- Anita Dobson as Janine, Kelly's wild grandmother who gets infected after she is bitten where she becomes murderously careless and savage.
- Ava Hinds Jones as Billy, Charlie's older sister who is in the army.
- Robert James-Collier as Michael, Charlie's abusive stepfather.
- T'Nia Miller as Karen, Charlie's mother.
- Ellora Torchia as Gil Lonian, an MP in Westminster who tries to contain the damage within Dambury.
- Michael Smiley as Colonel Wrollen, an army colonel who secretly caused the Salvepurian truck to crash.
- Johnny Vegas as Jason, Kelly's father.
- Suzanne Ahmet as Lorraine, Kelly's mother.
- Sophie Leigh Stone as Wendy, Steff's deaf mother.
- Chris Reilly as Terry, Steff's dim-witted yet caring father.
- Rebecca Humphries as Jane, a young woman who gets bitten and infected.
- D’Angelou Osei Kissiedu as Kofi, a boy from London who sells drugs to help his sick mother.
- Ellie-Mae Siame as Maisy, Charlie and Billy's younger sister who becomes friends with Kofi. She is revealed to be Michael's biological daughter making her half siblings to Charlie and Billy.
- Robin Hill as Karl, a crime lord from London. Hill reprises his role from Wheatley's previous movie Down Terrace.
- Gareth Tunley as Jon, Karl's partner. Tunley also reprises his role from Down Terrace.
- John Hollingworth as Sgt Martin Parrenster, an army sergeant who looks for Billy after she runs away.
- Maanuv Thiara as Malcolm, Billy's best friend in the army.
- Garrick Hagon as Gabe, an elderly man who becomes infected.
- Mark Monero as Jim, a member of the Dambury Neighbourhood Watch.
- Bekir Aslan as Mike, a soldier who is killed when the Salvepurian truck he is driving crashes.
- Jack Maddison as Lahro
- Andrew Kazamia as Joseph
- Joss Carter as Ciaran
- Mark Rainsbury as Policeman Jones

== Episodes ==
No.	Title	Directed by	Written by	Original release date
1	"Episode 1"	Ben Wheatley	Ben Wheatley	October 13, 2024
On the outskirts of the town of Dambury, an army transport vehicle seemingly accidentally crashes which causes a chemical tanker to spill its contents. The chemical came from the apparently shutdown Kafferton Chemical Research Facility. Sunny Rise Retirement Home members Cecily and Frank are caught in the spill and are infected with a mysterious virus, turning them into zombies. The two infect the other members and kill the staff before retreating to Dambury Forest where Frank and Cecily are separated. The next day, the government quarantines the care home whilst Golden Uplands Retirement Home member Morgan investigates. In the woods, teenagers Charlie and Stef witness a zombie attack a woman named Jane where she is bitten and her dog is killed. Meanwhile Kelly, Charlie’s ex-girlfriend, brings food to her grandmother Janine who has been infected after she was bitten earlier by a zombie when she was taking her rubbish out. Eventually, Janine tries to eat Kelly but Stef and Charlie arrive and shoot Janine with a crossbow.
2	"Episode 2"	Ben Wheatley	Ben Wheatley	October 13, 2024
In Westminster, Gil Lonian orders Dambury to be isolated. Charlie and Stef hide Janine’s body in the woods while Kelly explains the incident to her parents. Meanwhile Jane’s bite takes effect and she becomes a zombie in the hospital. Charlie’s abusive stepfather Michael meets up with Kofi, a young boy from London who was supposed to have delivered him drugs but he claims that he was attacked in the woods and the attackers took the drugs. Michael calls Karl, Kofi’s boss who says he’ll come down to Dambury and sort the situation out. In the woods, soldiers Malcolm and Billy, the latter being Charlie’s older sister, find and kill a zombie but Malcolm is infected when Billy shoots the zombie dead and his blood splatters on Malcolm. Kelly and Charlie skip school so he can take her to where he left Janine but find that she is still alive and has moved herself with no memory of what happened the previous night. Frank and Cecily finally reunite after he saves her and the zombies from soldiers. At the army base, Malcolm succumbs to his infection and shoots a sergeant dead. He then tells Billy to gather her family and escape the area before the virus spreads. Billy escapes and Malcolm is shot dead. Stef shows the video of Jane being attacked to fellow student Finn who is aware of the infection and the two go to Jane’s mother’s house where they find Jane attacking her mother. The two break into the house and find Jane’s mother’s dead body. When Finn attacks Jane, she forgets about eating her mother and then strangely starts to burn up and eventually dies. Karl arrives in Dambury and tells Michael to pay him £5,000 in order to pay him back for the drugs. Charlie and Kelly find Janine’s body missing and Stef arrives with Finn to explain what is going on. Billy finds the zombies partying in the woods, to her shock and confusion. Janine attacks Jason, her son and Kelly’s father.
3	"Episode 3"	Ben Wheatley	Ben Wheatley	October 13, 2024
Cecily and the zombies show the impressed residents of Golden Uplands their newfound athletic abilities (it is also revealed that Morgan is an ex-boyfriend of Cecily). They then chase Morgan and bite him. Meanwhile Jason is hospitalised and the army take any recent patients to a temporary military ward. Finn takes Stef to see Morgan but the army shows up. Stef distracts them whilst Finn and Morgan hide. Stef’s parents arrive and pick him up and when they get home, Stef argues with his father Terry. Morgan explains to Finn that the chemical is called Salvepuerian, a “society killer” causing older members of the community to gain aggressive and regenerative traits and survive by eating flesh. He also explains that when used on younger people, it causes them to die quicker which explains June’s sudden death. Billy returns home to find that Michael is still there, much to her disappointment. Morgan uses an inhibitor serum to apparently slow his infection. Meanwhile, Janine retreats to the forest where she meets the other zombies and is accepted into the group. Stef returns to Golden Uplands and Finn leaves with him and the two discover the army rounding up some of the townspeople and imprisoning them in a coup. They then retreat with Charlie and Kelly to the woods where they meet up with Billy. After an argument, Stef walks off and Kelly ends up having sex with him when she tries to calm him down. The group then devise a plan to break the imprisoned townspeople out. During the escape, Kelly discovers that Jason has become a zombie and eaten Lorraine, his wife and Kelly’s mother. He then chases Kelly and ends up briefly attacking Finn. He tells Kelly to run before being shot dead. The group escape into the woods where Billy helps them escape. After escaping, Finn reveals that Jason bit her.
4	"Episode 4"	Ben Wheatley	Ben Wheatley	October 13, 2024
Frank reveals that he ate his son, daughter-in-law and grandson, much to Cecily’s shock and horror. Finn eventually turns into a zombie and tries to eat the others but is knocked out by Billy. After being tied up, Finn reveals to Charlie that Stef and Kelly had sex the previous night. Gil is given an option if the havoc caused by the virus is greatly increased: Operation Icarus, which means blowing up Dambury. Back in the woods, Cecily begins to feel remorse and guilt over zombies like Frank and Janine eating their descendants. Billy splits from the group to go and pick up her family while the group go to Morgan’s to sort out Finn. Billy returns home to find that Karl has invaded and holding Michael at gunpoint. She manages to get them out of the house and into a van before getting arrested by the army. Morgan deduces that Finn must eat his lower spleen in order to stop her from getting aggressive and trying to eat people. During the operation, Finn reveals to Stef that she has feelings for him. Afterwards, Stef finds out that their A-Levels are unfortunately back on. Meanwhile, Cecily and Janine fight which ends with Janine throwing Cecily off a cliff and appoints herself Cecily’s replacement as co-leader even though Frank shows some sadness. Gil becomes suspicious as to finding out that the army has been moving Salvepuerian across the country and theorises that an inside person deliberately caused the chemical spill. The army attempt to leave Dambury with Billy but are blocked off by soldiers at the barrier who also strip them of their weapons and other equipment. During the A-Levels, Finn throws up Morgan’s spleen and re-eats it. Suddenly, the zombies attack the school and kill multiple students and staff. They also nearly kill Stef who snaps over all the stress. Meanwhile, in Morgan’s cellar, a still-living Cecily enters and asks to be fed.
5	"Episode 5"	Ben Wheatley	Ben Wheatley	October 13, 2024
Stef’s home is burglarised and Terry is beaten. In the woods, Billy encourages the army to rearm themselves. Morgan finds out that Cecily has 24 hours before she becomes immobilised from the virus. Stef returns home to find his house looted and his parents missing. One of the zombies, Joe seemingly dies and the zombies bury him. Whilst Michael and Karen, Charlie’s mother, argue, Kofi and Maisy sneak off into the woods. Zombies then attack Stef’s house and the group retreat to Morgan’s while Stef stays behind to fight the zombies. The army break into the Dambury Museum and arm themselves with historic armour and weapons. Stef’s parents meet up with the neighbourhood watch. Finn, Kelly and Charlie meet Cecily who has had a change of heart and has generously donated her body to science. The neighbourhood watch meet up with Michael and Karen who are looking for Maisy and Kofi. Charlie finds Stef who feels inadequate. With zombies approaching, Stef tells Charlie to leave and willingly lets himself get bitten and infected. Karl then willingly joins the search for Kofi and Maisy as he has kids of his own. Meanwhile, Maisy and Kofi finds the drug bag which he was supposed to give to Michael, revealing that he lied but only because his mother had bronchitis and needed a new boiler. They also find a still-living Joe who briefly chases them but is killed by Charlie. During the search for her parents, Billy is bitten. Charlie brings Maisy and Kofi back to town where Michael finds out that Kofi lied about the drugs. Billy begins to turn increasingly aggressive. The neighbourhood watch launch an attack against the barrier surrounding Dambury leading to some townspeople getting killed. During the confusion, Michael attempts to steal Kofi’s drug-filled bag but Karen knocks him out only for Karl to take the drugs. Kelly finds out that Morgan worked at Kafferton and that he created the virus so that he could stop fighting altogether with fighting. He also reveals that his inhibitor serum is actually an antidote and that thanks to the kids, he was able to create the new cure and cures Finn. Meanwhile, Gil finds out that Colonel Wrollen signed the order for Operation Icarus and that he caused the spill to happen by shooting the tire of the truck causing it to crash as all part of a revenge plan to make the Armed Forces look like the heroes as they have been shoved aside and treated poorly by the government. He then shoots Gil dead and makes it look like a suicide.
6	"Episode 6"	Ben Wheatley	Ben Wheatley	October 13, 2024
Billy leads a militia throughout Dambury while Finn, Morgan, Kelly and Cecily try to get the cure out of antidote. Billy breaks into the police station with her army and find the sex offenders list. Terry ends up being shot in all the confusion and Cecily starts to find it difficult to move. Michael wakes up and walks back into Dambury. Finn, Morgan, Kelly and Cecily find Stef who Finn angrily beats for willingly becoming a zombie. During the fight, she accidentally breaks Stef’s cure. Charlie and Kelly reunite as everyone in Dambury gathers in the hospital where Morgan reveals the cure and that he created it. Billy’s militia enters the hospital and take custody of Morgan and Michael. They also take custody of an elderly man who shares the name of a convicted paedophile and force him to run a gauntlet where he is killed. Michael and Morgan are forced to run the gauntlet. Billy chooses Michael mostly due to him drunkenly molesting her when she was 18. Before he does, Michael reveals that he is Maisy’s biological father much to Billy’s anger and sadness. Despite this, she still commands Morgan to run the gauntlet. Meanwhile, the zombies claim more victims in the woods and take the town hall while Cecily seemingly dies from the final stages of the virus. Finn gives Stef her spleen to eat and he runs home where he bites a dying Terry to save him. As Morgan and Michael run the gauntlet, Kelly intervenes with a car and saves Morgan and Charlie while Karl distracts everyone with a gun and flees. Billy lets Michael go and bids farewell to her family before staying behind to fight at the town hall. Finn goes to Stef’s house where she finds that he has infected Terry. Kelly, Charlie and Morgan manage to escape Dambury with the cure and show the cure to Wrollen who refuses to call off the bomb. At the town hall, a battle ensures between the militia and the zombies while Janine and Frank chase and fight Billy. The bomb explodes killing 347 people, possibly including Billy and Janine. However, Finn, Stef, Stef’s parents, Charlie’s family, Frank and multiple townspeople and zombies survive. At Kafferton, Finn, Stef, Charlie and Kelly are introduced to a mysterious man who congratulates them for surviving and preventing the virus to spread further. The group request to go to a good university and for their families to be rehoused. Dambury’s destruction is blamed on gas explosions and the immobilised zombies are revealed to have turned into stone-like cocoons/shells. Stef is hospitalised, Charlie and Kelly are institutionalised and both end up at Manchester University. Meanwhile, in Dambury Forest, a young woman emerges from a stone-like cocoon/shell and hitches a ride on a truck leaving Dambury where she reveals herself as Cecily.

== Production ==
=== Development ===
Channel 4 commissioned a six-part zombie series set in a care home from Ben Wheatley in August 2019. With Wheatley writing and directing, George Faber was set as producer, with a concept of a diverse group of younger faces, with a marauding group of zombie pensioners, as a way to satirise post-Brexit Britain.

The series was produced in 2023 by The Forge, in association with ZDF and All3Media International. It was produced by Alex Kazamia. The executive producers were Ben Wheatley and Beth Willis.

On March 10, 2025, Channel 4 cancelled the series after one season.

=== Casting ===
In October 2023, the lead cast included Sue Johnston, Robert Lindsay, Lewis Gribben, Paul Benthall, Jay Lycurgo, Buket Komur, Viola Prettejohn and Ava Hinds Jones, alongside a wider ensemble cast featuring Johnny Vegas, Anita Dobson and Rebecca Humphries.

=== Filming ===
Filming took place in Wales in the autumn of 2023, with filming locations including around Torfaen, such as Fairwater, Coed Eva, Llanyrafon, Ponthir and Pontypool.

== Release ==
All six episodes of Generation Z premiered on 13 October 2024, available to stream for Channel 4+ subscribers. The series was available to stream for non-subscribers on 27 October 2024.
