= Somewhere Boy =

British television crime drama miniseries

- Genre: Crime; Drama; Mystery
- Created by: Pete Jackson
- Written by: Pete Jackson
- Directed by: Alex Winckler; Alexandra Brodski
- Starring: Lewis Gribben
- Composer: Paul Haslinger
- Country of origin: United Kingdom
- Original language: English
- No. of series: 1
- No. of episodes: 8

Production
- Executive producers: Murray Ferguson; Petra Fried; Emily Harrison
- Producer: Gavin O'Grady
- Production company: Clerkenwell Films

Original release
- Network: Channel 4
- Release: 16 October – 19 October 2022

Somewhere Boy is a British drama series filmed in South Wales, starring Lewis Gribben and written by Pete Jackson. It began airing on Channel 4 from 16 October 2022.

Filming locations include Cardiff and the Brecon Beacons.

In June 2023 the show aired in the US on Hulu.

== Plot ==
The series focuses on teenager Danny, who since his mother's fatal accident, has been isolated from the outside world by his father. When Danny realises that monsters do not exist, like his father has claimed, he questions his entire existence.

== Cast and characters ==
- Lewis Gribben as Danny
- Samuel Bottomley as Aaron
- Rory Keenan as Steve
- Lisa McGrillis as Sue
- Johann Myers as Paul
- Kieran Urquhart as Ash
- Austin Haynes as Young Danny

== Episodes ==
No. overall	Episode	Directed by	Written by	Original release date	UK viewers (millions) (Note: Excludes viewership through All4 and devices.)
1	Episode 1	Alex Winckler	Pete Jackson	16 October 2022	0.854
2	Episode 2	Alex Winckler	Pete Jackson	16 October 2022	0.731
3	Episode 3	Alex Winckler	Pete Jackson	17 October 2022	0.677
4	Episode 4	Alex Winckler	Pete Jackson	17 October 2022	0.511
5	Episode 5	Alexandra Brodski	Pete Jackson	18 October 2022	0.464
6	Episode 6	Alexandra Brodski	Pete Jackson	18 October 2022	N/A (<0.443) (Note: Not reported in the weekly top 50 programmes.)
7	Episode 7	Alexandra Brodski	Pete Jackson	19 October 2022	0.545
8	Episode 8	Alexandra Brodski	Pete Jackson	19 October 2022	0.449

== Reception ==
The series received positive reviews. Rebecca Nicholson in The Guardian gave the series a perfect five out of five stars. Anita Singh in The Telegraph also gave it five out of five stars, praising Gribben's performance and dubbing the show 'unforgettable'. Nick Hilton from The Independent gave the first episode four out of five stars.
