= Lewis Gribben =

Scottish actor

- Gribben in 2026
- Born: 10 October 1995 (age 31); Glasgow, Scotland
- Education: Queen Margaret University
- Occupation: Actor

Lewis Gribben (born November 1999) is a Scottish actor from Glasgow. He had the lead role in the 2022 British drama series Somewhere Boy shown on Channel 4 and subsequently won a Screen Daily rising star award and a Scottish BAFTA for best TV actor.

== Career ==
Gribben was born and raised in Glasgow. An only child, his mother started taking him to the Glasgow Citizens Theatre at age seven to help him interact more with other children. Diagnosed with autism and dyslexia, Gribben told The Scotsman that he has some life experience that helped him play the role of Danny in Channel 4 and Clerkenwell Films 2022 drama Somewhere Boy, about a teenage boy who on his father's death learns he has been given a distorted view of life since infancy.

As a teenager Gribben acted with a company called the Attic Collective before attending Glasgow Clyde College for two years, and then graduating in 2019 with a BA Hons Acting for Stage and Screen from Queen Margaret University in Edinburgh. A succession of small roles followed in films such as T2 Trainspotting and Get Duked!, and television series such as Silent Witness, Deadwater Fell, and Shetland, before he landed the lead role in Somewhere Boy. Following the success of Somewhere Boy he was named Screen Daily Rising Star 2022.

Gribben had roles in Masters of the Air for Apple TV and Chemistry of Death for Paramount+. In 2023 he started filming Ben Wheatley's comedy-horror series Generation Z.

== Personal life ==
Gribben still lives in Glasgow. He told The Guardian in 2022, "Every time I do anything in Scotland, they just say: 'Are you ever gonna come down to London?' Absolutely not."

== Filmography ==
Key
†	Denotes films that have not yet been released

=== Film ===
Year	Title	Role	Notes
2017	T2: Trainspotting	Dealer	
2019	Get Duked!	Duncan	
2019	Farmland	Charlie	Short film
2019	Our Ladies	Patient at Lourdes	
2020	Limbo	Stevie	
2020	Stray Dog	Boy	Short film
2021	The Iain Banks Appreciation Society	Tommy	Short film
2023	Ginny Reaper	Ghost William	Short film
2024	The Bird Feeder	Brian	Short film
2024	The Severed Sun	David	
2024	The Damned	Jónas	
2024	Krater	Stell (voice)	Short film
2026	How to Wash a Body, How to Cleanse a Soul	Jack	Short film
2026	The Perfect Strangers	Kieran	Short film
TBA	Bare	TBA	Filming

=== Television ===
Year	Title	Role	Notes
2020	Deadwater Fell	Dylan Denham-Johnson	Mini-series; 3 episodes
2021	Silent Witness	Simon Morton	2 episodes: "Bad Love: Parts 1 & 2"
2021	Shetland	Fraser Creggan	Series 6; 4 episodes
2022	Somewhere Boy	Danny	Main cast; 8 episodes
2023	The Chemistry of Death	Kevin Kinross	4 episodes
2024	Masters of the Air	Sgt. Robert Bixler	Mini-series; 2 episodes: "Part Three" & "Part Five"
2024	Generation Z	Stef	Main cast; 6 episodes
2025	Black Mirror	Younger Cameron Walker	Episode: "Plaything"
2026	Mint	Luke	4 episodes
2026	Blade Runner 2099 †	TBA	Upcoming mini-series; 6 episodes
