= Charlotte Regan =

British film director

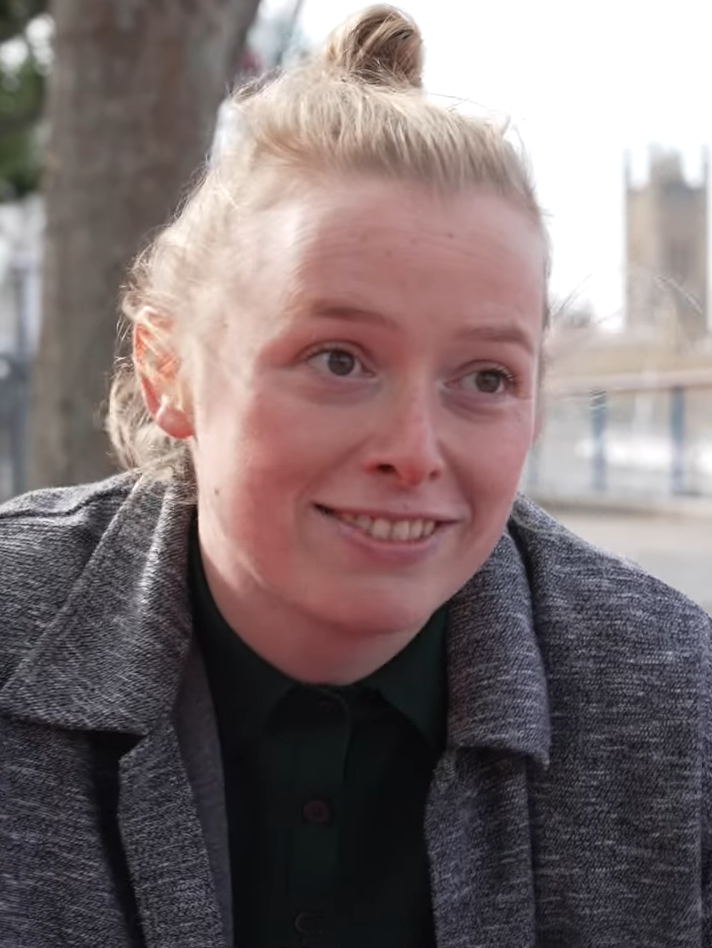
- Charlotte Regan in 2023
- Born: 19 June 1994 (age 32); Hackney, London, England
- Education: Ravensbourne University London
- Occupation: Film director
- Notable work: Scrapper
- Website: Official website

Charlotte Regan (born 19 June 1994) is a British film director. She has directed many music videos, and her short films have been shown at major international film festivals. In 2023, her debut feature film Scrapper won the Grand Jury Prize for the World Cinema Dramatic Competition at the 2023 Sundance Film Festival.

Regan's films are often characterised, as The Guardian describes, focusing "on working-class communities and characters." She has spoken in interviews of the barriers faced by working-class people in the film industry, and others' privilege.

== Biography ==
Regan was born in Hackney and raised in North London with her mother and grandmother. According to an interview with The Guardian, some of Regan's childhood was with her grandmother on an estate in Islington.

As a teenager, she also worked as a paparazzi photographer; photographing film sets such as Skyfall inspired her to become a filmmaker herself. She started filming music promos when she was 15, going on to direct more than 200 of them, including for Mumford & Sons ("Beloved") and for Stereophonics ("Fly Like an Eagle").

Regan graduated from Ravensbourne University London in 2016 with a Bachelor of Arts (BA) in Digital Film Production. Her first short film Standby (2016) premiered at the Toronto International Film Festival (TIFF). Set entirely in a police car, it went on to win a Sundance Ignite award and be nominated for a BAFTA. Her second short film Fry-Up was screened at the BFI London Film Festival, Sundance and Berlinale. Her third film, Dodgy Dave, played at Toronto (TIFF) and BFI London.

In 2017, Regan was talent-spotted by Michael Fassbender’s production company, Finn McCool Films. She then developed Scrapper, about a 12-year-old girl reunited with her father following the death of her mother. Scrapper premiered at the 2023 Sundance Film Festival, where it won the Grand Jury Prize for the World Cinema Dramatic Competition.
