= Ceara Coveney =

British actress (born 1997)

- Born: Ceara Jane Coveney; 8 August 1997 (age 29); Swindon, England
- Education: University of Northampton
- Years active: 2019–present

Ceara Jane Coveney (born 8 August 1997) is a British actress. On television, she is known for her role as Elayne Trakand in the Amazon Prime series The Wheel of Time (2023–2025).

== Early life ==
Coveney was born in Swindon and grew up "just outside". She has three older sisters, whom she followed into taking dance lessons, and a younger brother, Adam, who was born in 2002. Coveney graduated with a Bachelor of Arts (BA) in Acting from the University of Northampton in 2018.

== Career ==
Coveney made her television debut in 2022 playing Mia, a supporting role, in the second season of the Netflix series Young Wallander.

Announced in 2021, Coveney joined the cast of the Amazon Prime fantasy series The Wheel of Time for its second season in 2023 as Elayne Trakand. She reprised her role in the third season. Also in 2023, Coveney made her feature film debut in Hoard.

In 2026, Coveney had a recurring role in the second season of the Apple TV+ series Criminal Record as Jen and played Lucy Steele in Georgia Oakley's film adaptation of Sense and Sensibility.

== Filmography ==
=== Film ===
Year	Title	Role	Notes
2019	The Amazing World of Emma	Emma Marston	Short film
2021	The Track	Lucy	Short film
2023	Hoard	Leah	
2026	Sense and Sensibility	Lucy Steele	
TBA	Invertigo		

=== Television ===
Year	Title	Role	Notes
2022	Young Wallander	Mia	4 episodes (season 2)
2023–2025	The Wheel of Time	Elayne Trakand	Main role (seasons 2–3)
2026	Criminal Record	Jen	7 episodes
