= Billionaire Boys Club (2018 film) =

2018 film directed by James Cox

- Theatrical release poster
- Directed by: James Cox
- Written by: James Cox; Captain Mauzner
- Produced by: Cassian Elwes; Holly Wiersma
- Starring: Ansel Elgort; Taron Egerton; Emma Roberts; Kevin Spacey; Jeremy Irvine; Thomas Cocquerel; Rosanna Arquette; Cary Elwes; Judd Nelson; Barney Harris
- Cinematography: James M. Muro
- Edited by: Glen Scantlebury
- Music by: Joel J. Richard
- Production companies: Elevated Films; Armory Films
- Distributed by: Vertical Entertainment
- Release date: August 17, 2018 (United States)
- Running time: 108 minutes
- Country: United States
- Language: English
- Budget: $15 million
- Box office: $2.7 million

Billionaire Boys Club is a 2018 American biographical crime drama film directed by James Cox and co-written by Cox and Captain Mauzner. The film is about the social club and Ponzi scheme of the same name. The film stars Ansel Elgort, Taron Egerton, Emma Roberts, Kevin Spacey, Jeremy Irvine, Thomas Cocquerel, Rosanna Arquette, Cary Elwes, and Judd Nelson. The film is based on the real-life Billionaire Boys Club from Southern California during the 1980s, a group of rich teenagers who got involved in a Ponzi scheme and, eventually, murder. The story was previously made into a television film in 1987, which starred Judd Nelson as Joe Hunt. Nelson plays that character's father in the 2018 version.

Originally announced in 2010 and filmed in 2015, Billionaire Boys Club is one of the final works that Spacey filmed prior to numerous sexual misconduct allegations made against him in 2017, and the accusations directly affected the film's release schedule and marketing. The film was released in the United States through video on demand on July 17, 2018, prior to a limited release on August 17, 2018, by Vertical Entertainment, and was a commercial failure. The domestic opening weekend box office take of just $618, from 11 theaters, was the lowest of Spacey's career. The film was panned by critics, although Spacey's performance was praised.

== Plot ==
Led by their fellow preppie friend Joe Hunt, a group of wealthy young men in 1980s Los Angeles come up with a plan to get rich quick with a Ponzi scheme. The plan ends badly for all involved when Hunt and friend Tim Pittman end up murdering investor and con man Ron Levin.

== Cast ==
- Ansel Elgort as Joe Hunt, the group leader and a financial expert.
- Taron Egerton as Dean Karny, his school buddy and closest ally within the BBC, who eventually becomes a witness against him.
- Emma Roberts as Sydney Evans, the love interest of Hunt.
- Kevin Spacey as Ron Levin, a Beverly Hills high roller.
- Ryan Rottman as Scott Biltmore, Kyle's twin brother and one of the two handsome twins adopted by the owner of Maybelline, who first invested in the club.
- Jeremy Irvine as Kyle Biltmore, Scott's twin brother and one of the members of the Billionaire Boys Club.
- Thomas Cocquerel as Charlie Bottoms
- Bokeem Woodbine as Tim Pittman, a bouncer who becomes involved in the club's doings.
- Barney Harris as Reza "Izzy" Eslaminia, The Persian's son and Billionaire Boys Club member.
- Waleed Zuaiter as The Persian (real name Hedayat Eslaminia), Izzy's Father
- Suki Waterhouse as Quintana "Q" Bisset, the love interest of Karny.
- Billie Lourd as Rosanna Ricci, the love interest of Biltmore.
- Judd Nelson as Ryan Hunt, Joe's father
- Maurice Johnson as Detective
- Billy Slaughter as Loan Officer
- Rosanna Arquette as Debbie Evans, Sydney's mother
- Cary Elwes as Andy Warhol
- Justin Arnold as Carter
- Marc Mani as Dr. Marc Mani Jr.
- Carmen Illán as The Persian's wife

== Production ==
In May 2010, The Hollywood Reporter confirmed that James Cox would direct the crime thriller film Billionaire Boys Club, the true story of a group of rich young boys in Los Angeles during the early 1980s who started the Billionaire Boys Club to run a Ponzi scheme. Cox wrote the script in four months after an exclusive research of the events with his brother Stephen, who spent another four months on it. Cox gathered the material for the screenplay from court documents, oral transcripts, and published articles. He said, "as we were writing this, I thought, 'What if 'Wall Street' became 'Alpha Dog' halfway through?" Holly Wiersma would produce the film.

On October 29, 2015, Ansel Elgort and Taron Egerton joined the cast, with Elgort playing Joe Hunt, the group leader and financial expert, and Egerton playing Dean Karny, a pro tennis player. Captain Mauzner also co-wrote the script along with Cox, while producers on the film would be Wiersma and Cassian Elwes. The film would be financed by Armory Films, and Good Universe would handle the international sales. In November 2015, Kevin Spacey signed on to play Ron Levin, a Beverly Hills high roller, Emma Roberts was added to the cast to portray Sydney, Hunt's love interest and Suki Waterhouse was cast to play Quintana, Karny's love interest.

In December 2015, Variety reported that Judd Nelson, who originally played Joe Hunt in the 1987 miniseries Billionaire Boys Club, would play the role of Ryan Hunt, Joe's father. That same month, Ryan Rottman signed on to portray Scott Biltmore, one of the two handsome twins adopted by the owner of Maybelline, who first invested in the Club and Thomas Cocquerel joined the film. Bokeem Woodbine, Billie Lourd and Jeremy Irvine also joined the cast of the film, with Irvine playing Kyle Biltmore, one of the members of the Billionaire Boys Club, Lourd as Rosanna, his love interest, and Woodbine as a club bouncer who becomes involved in the club's doings.

Principal photography began in New Orleans on December 7, 2015. The film wrapped on January 25, 2016, with re-shoots set for November of the same year.

== Release ==
The film was initially released through video on demand on July 17, 2018, prior to a limited release in theaters on August 17, 2018, by Vertical Entertainment.

Despite allegations of sexual misconduct being made against Kevin Spacey in October 2017, Vertical Entertainment stated that they would be going forward with the release of the film:

We don't condone sexual harassment on any level and we fully support victims of it. At the same time, this is neither an easy nor insensitive decision to release this film in theatres, but we believe in giving the cast, as well as hundreds of crew members who worked hard on the film, the chance to see their final product reach audiences.

== Reception ==
=== Box office ===
Billionaire Boys Club grossed a total worldwide of $2.7 million and $1,349 in North America, against a production budget of $15 million. On its opening day in the United States, the film earned $126 from ten theaters, the worst opening for a film starring Kevin Spacey. TheWrap noted that the ten theaters where the film was shown were mostly located in areas which were not considered to be major markets, and that some of the theaters showing the film scheduled their screenings for off-peak times, such as early in the morning or late at night. The weekend total gross ended up at $618, with a final theater count of eleven.

=== Critical response ===
On the review aggregation website Rotten Tomatoes, the film holds an approval rating of 7% based on 15 reviews, with an average rating of 3.5/10. On Metacritic, the film has a weighted average score of 30 out of 100, based on 5 critics, indicating "generally unfavorable" reviews.

Mick LaSalle of the San Francisco Chronicle said that he has no doubt that "Spacey is very good at playing the bad guy" and that although only in a supporting role "dominates every moment of every scene in which he appears". LaSalle was unconvinced by the idea that Hunt made "bad decisions involving thousands [that] led to more bad decisions" but rather "the storm was of his own making" and concludes as his "life unravels, so does the movie". Eric Kohn at IndieWire called it a "wannabe Wolf of Wall Street" and said that it is "intermittently engaging as a B-movie" but "never finds a satisfying tone." John DeFore at The Hollywood Reporter called the film "a derivative bore" and accused it of being "creatively clueless" for "indulging in this period piece without finding some fresh critique".

=== Awards and nominations ===
Year	Award	Category	Nominated work	Result	Ref.
2019	Golden Raspberry Awards	Barry L. Bumstead Award	Billionaire Boys Club	Won	
