= Billionaire Boys Club (1987 film) =

- Original print ad for the miniseries
- Genre: Drama; Thriller
- Written by: Gy Waldron
- Directed by: Marvin J. Chomsky
- Starring: Judd Nelson
- Music by: Jorge Calandrelli
- Country of origin: United States
- Original language: English

Production
- Executive producer: Donald March
- Producers: Marcy Gross; Ann Weston
- Cinematography: Isidore Mankofsky
- Editors: Tom Pryor; William B. Stich
- Running time: 200 minutes

Original release
- Network: NBC
- Release: November 8 – November 9, 1987

Billionaire Boys Club is a two-part television film that aired on NBC in 1987. It told the story of the Billionaire Boys Club, and its founder, Joe Hunt, who was convicted in 1987 of murdering con-man Ron Levin. The film was written by Gy Waldron and directed by Marvin J. Chomsky.

== Cast ==
The film starred Judd Nelson as Hunt, Brian McNamara as Dean Karny, and Ron Silver as Ron Levin. Other cast members included Frederic Lehne, John Stockwell, Barry Tubb, Raphael Sbarge, Jill Schoelen, Stan Shaw, John Dye, and James Sloyan. Since criminal charges were pending against other Billionaire Boys Club members, the film changed their names.

== Synopsis ==
Joe Hunt and other boys are on trial.

Throughout the questioning and cross-examination the film flashes back to Joe Hunt being reunited with school friends and impressing upon them an idea of an investment firm called the BBC. Joe manages to win the boys over with two concepts: his idea that anything can be right through perspective and that the boys come from moneyed families who think they are too young or have insufficient mettle to access the family fortunes.

The BBC acts and dresses like professional businessmen, but their actual operations seem largely "all hat no cattle"; spending investors' funds on personal expenses. They manage to woo a scientist into signing over the marketing rights to an energy machine and seek investor Ron Levin into a partnership. Levin is skeptical, but gives Hunt an account to prove himself. Hunt manages to make several million dollars with this, and purchases a condominium in which all members of the BBC will work and live with the expected commission. Hunt also is introduced to a man named Booker, who also becomes a BBC member due to his expertise in hand-to-hand combat and firearms. However, Hunt is aghast when he learns the money he made for Levin was only on paper, and that he was being used by Levin in order to convince another firm into underwriting a sizeable loan for him. Hunt hatches a scheme to get Levin to sign over the promised money, then murder him.

Some time later, Hunt meets up with Dean Karny, his top employee of the BBC, and says that Levin is dead. Hunt recounts that he went to Levin for a business meeting, which was then broken up by Booker, pretending to be a debt collector for the Mafia who is after Hunt, to which the "debtor" Hunt would repay the "creditors" with the money owed him by Levin. After Levin writes a check to Hunt, he realizes too late both men intend to murder him. He is killed, then his corpse is dumped in a canyon in the California backcountry. Soon friends and family of Ron Levin contact the police about his disappearance. When it is discovered Levin had served time in prison for credit card fraud and wire fraud, the authorities chalk up Levin's missing status to fleeing those he flimflammed.

At a BBC party, Hunt is introduced to Masud Nabouti, a friend of a BBC member seeking membership himself. Masud, who was born in Iran, says his father, Birjan Nabouti, was an opium kingpin who made enemies with Ruhollah Khomeini, and seeks to take over his father's empire. Hunt recruits Booker and Karny in a plot to kidnap Birjan, torture him into signing over his assets to Masoud and the BBC, then murder him. Booker and Hunt impersonate delivery boys to gain access to the Nabouti residence, then lock Birjan in a steamer trunk and place it in a camper truck for transport to a safe house in upstate California. However, the kidnapping goes awry when Mr. Nabouti stops protesting and it is evident his oxygen is depleted in the trunk. Karny punches holes in the trunk for air, but seals them with duct tape upon hearing shouting, as Hunt orders it silenced as he is fearful passing motorists may be alerted to the shouting. Karny later opens the trunk, and finds an unconscious man while the odor of urine escapes. Joe, who is driving, orders CPR be given to Birjan Nabouti. Karny attempts this, but apparently fails and reports to Joe he is dead. While Joe is annoyed, he takes it in stride and, in a change of plans, dumps Birjan Nabouti's body in the same canyon he disposed of Ron Levin. Joe forges Birjan's signature in a conservatorship for Masud.

However, all is not well with Joe as investors are demanding to withdraw funds or close accounts. Some of the BBC members, disturbed by what they have done, start talking with each other about what Joe may do next. One boy tells his father, who immediately recommends legal help. Meanwhile, the authorities are trying to piece together Birjan's disappearance. When fraud is suspected, a last-minute injunction bars Masud from withdrawing any money from his father's Swiss accounts, most of which are closed or have low balances. When the police search the Levin residence for clues, they acquire a list detailing Joe's plans to murder Levin. In a meeting with outraged investors, Joe gets arrested, and the scene returns to the trial.

== Controversy ==
Hunt sued NBC in attempt to block the network from airing the film, alleging that it would prejudice potential jurors in his upcoming second murder trial. Hunt's suit was unsuccessful, and the film was broadcast. Brandon Tartikoff, the head of NBC entertainment, said that while he did not regret airing the film, the promos for it may have crossed the boundaries of good taste.

== Aftermath ==
Members of Hunt's family also voiced an objection. Hunt's brother-in-law Michael Olivier said the film "was biased against Joe before his trials were even complete, full of sensationalized hype, with blatant disregard for the documented facts in the case. Fictional storytelling is one thing, but this is a real person’s life. It’s irresponsible to mix the two in a way that negatively impacts our entire family.” The miniseries' factual inaccuracies include:

The second half of the movie presents the situation involving Hedayat Eslaminia as if law enforcement's version of his death was proven at trial. Actually, the prosecutors dismissed their case against all four defendants, including Joe Hunt, after Hunt established to the satisfaction of a majority of his jury that Dean Karny, the State's star witness, was solely responsible for Hedayat's death.

Though the film concludes that Pittman shot Ron Levin, a jury in 1988 rejected the State's theory that Jim Pittman shot Ron Levin, voting 10–2 to acquit Pittman.

Excluding the general background facts related to the BBC, the miniseries is almost entirely based upon the testimony of a single witness, Dean Karny. Yet, neither Dean Karny nor any other prosecution witness has ever claimed they personally witnessed the death of Ron Levin. Ignored by the producers of the NBC miniseries are eight witnesses with no ties to Hunt who came forward with their encounters with Ron Levin after he absconded from Beverly Hills in 1984.

== Awards ==
Billionaire Boys Club was nominated for four Emmys: Outstanding Miniseries, Outstanding Directing in a Miniseries or Special, Outstanding Writing in a Miniseries or Special, and Outstanding Supporting Actor in a Miniseries or Special for Ron Silver.

It was also nominated for two Golden Globes: Best Actor in a Miniseries or TV Movie (Judd Nelson) and Best Supporting Actor in a Miniseries or TV Movie (Brian McNamara).

== Home media ==
A&E Entertainment released the film on DVD September 23, 2008.

== Second adaptation ==
A 2018 theatrical film about the scheme was released featuring Kevin Spacey and Emma Roberts. Judd Nelson also starred in this film, this time playing Ryan Hunt, the father of Joe Hunt. The film was a commercial failure, largely due to sexual allegations against Kevin Spacey, a year prior to its release.

== See also ==
- American Psycho – both the novel and the 2000 film adaption similar in content
- Wall Street – 1987 film similar in content
- "Opportunities (Let's Make Lots of Money)" – cover of the popular Pet Shop Boys song featured in the film
