= Dean Puckett =

English filmmaker

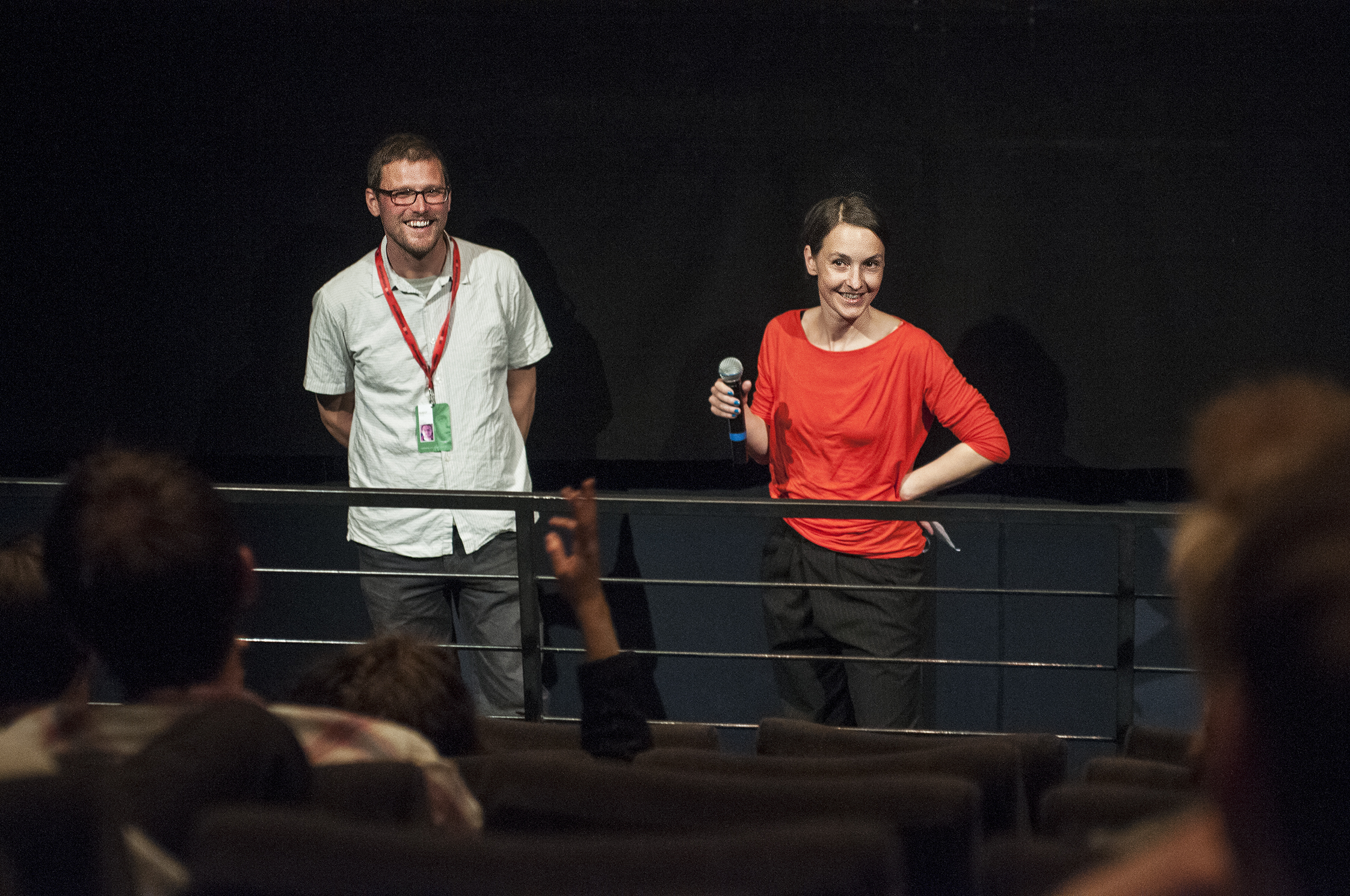
Dean Puckett (Director GRASP THE NETTLE) and Lotte Schreiber (moderator) in April 2014

Dean Puckett (15 January 1982) is an English filmmaker who studied at the Surrey Institute of Art and Design, in Farnham 2000-2003

Dean Puckett is a writer/ director and film lecturer at Falmouth University in Cornwall, England. He recently wrote and directed his debut feature THE SEVERED SUN, which was developed through iFeatures with BBC Films, Creative England and the BFI, and was funded by Screen Cornwall, with MPI Media handling sales. His short films have screened at festivals around the world and won a number of awards and Vimeo Staff picks. His short film THE SERMON (Funded by Creative England / BFI) was selected for festivals including Sitges, BFI Flare, Overlook, Palm Springs Shorts Fest and Hollyshorts, SATAN’S BITE won the Straight8 competition, and most recently THE DEVIL’S FOOTPRINTS was selected for festivals including FrightFest and Encounters Film Festival.He is currently developing a slate of feature film projects including SEAGULL, a vampire movie with BFI NETWORK, Rebecca Wolff & Early Day Films (BAIT), and ROT, A high octane body horror with Qwerty Films ( SEVERANCE, THE DUTCHESS, FLORENCE FOSTER JENKINS).

Dean is represented by Patrick Child at Independent Talent.

== Filmography ==
Documentaries

Honey At The Top - 2015

The AutistiX - 2015

Grasp The Nettle - 2013

The Crisis Of Civiliazaton - 2011

Short films

Circles - 2015

The Sermon - 2017

Satan’s Bite - 2017

Seagull - 2020

The Devil’s Footprints - 2023

Feature Films

The Severed Sun - 2024
