= Billionaire Boys Club =

Ponzi scheme

The Billionaire Boys Club, or BBC, was an investing and social club organized by Joseph Henry Hunt (born Joseph Henry Gamsky) in Southern California between 1983 and 1989. It was originally simply named "BBC", the initials of Bombay Bicycle Club, a restaurant Hunt had frequented as a young man in Chicago. The get-rich-quick schemes the group offered to clients disguised a Ponzi scheme.

The club enticed the sons of wealthy families from the Harvard School for Boys (now Harvard-Westlake School; not affiliated with Harvard University) in the Los Angeles area with get-rich-quick schemes. Due to the reputation of the organization for being composed of young, inexperienced men from moneyed families, it was jokingly referred to as the "Billionaire Boys' Club". Hunt himself came from a single-parent family in the lower-middle-class suburb of Van Nuys, and was able to attend the Harvard School only with the help of scholarships.

In 1984, Hunt was arrested for murdering Ron Levin, the group's main investor and himself a con artist, and Hedayat Eslaminia, the father of one of the club's members.

The story was recounted in a 1987 miniseries, a 2018 film and a 2025 CNN documentary series.

== Crime ==
The organization was a Ponzi scheme. Money contributed by investors supported lavish lifestyles for members of the club.

Hunt and club security director Jim Pittman were charged with the murder of Levin, a con artist who had allegedly swindled the BBC out of over $4 million. Levin's body was never found, and Hunt maintains that Levin, who was under criminal investigation and out on bail at the time of his disappearance, instead fled the country to escape prosecution.

BBC members Hunt, Pittman, Karny (before his immunity deal), Arben Dosti, and Reza Eslaminia were charged with the murder of Hedayat Eslaminia, Reza's father. They allegedly killed him to acquire his fortune, which was reputed to be $35 million (the senior Eslaminia was, in fact, nearly penniless).

When authorities began to investigate the murders, Dean Karny, the club's second-in-command and Hunt's best friend, turned state's evidence on both murders in return for immunity from prosecution on three different felony charges.

== Trials and convictions ==
During his trial for the murder of Levin, Hunt's defense attorney presented two witnesses, Carmen Canchola and Jesus Lopez, who testified that they saw Levin after his alleged murder, in September 1986 at a gas station in Tucson, Arizona. Canchola and Lopez identified pictures of Levin from multiple photographic lineups as the same man they had seen at the gas station. In 1987 a Southern California Court found Hunt guilty of Levin's 1984 murder and sentenced him to life in prison without the possibility of parole.

Pittman was unable to make $500,000 bail ($1.5 million today), so he was kept incarcerated through two Southern California trials for his active role in the murder of Levin. Both ended in hung juries. In 1988, before a third trial, prosecutors offered Pittman a deal, whereby he pleaded guilty to being an accessory to murder after the fact and possession of a concealed weapon, and was sentenced to time served, being the 3 1/2 years he was incarcerated since his 1984 arrest.

The trials for the murder of Hedayat Eslaminia were held in Northern California. With the testimony of accomplice Karny, both Dosti and Reza Eslaminia were convicted and sentenced to life imprisonment without parole. Dosti and Reza Eslaminia both were released on appeal using evidence from Hunt's second trial, and Hunt was also acquitted of the Eslaminia murder charge.

Hunt and Pitman's trials for murdering Levin had delayed their trials for murdering Eslaminia, with other pre-trial motions pushing Hunt's Northern California trial to 1992. Hunt acted as his own attorney during this trial and contended that star witness Karny had killed Eslaminia. The result was a hung jury, 8–4, in favor of Hunt's acquittal. Hunt is the only person in California legal history to represent himself in a capital case and not receive the death penalty. When prosecutors realized they likely could convict neither Hunt nor Pittman, they dismissed all charges against Hunt and Pittman in the murder of Eslaminia.

== Subsequent events ==
On May 20, 1993, a few months after all charges were dropped against him in the Eslaminia case, Jim Pittman admitted on the television program A Current Affair to have participated in the Levin murder, confessing that he was the one who shot Levin and bragging that he was now untouchable in court due to the restriction on double jeopardy. Pittman, granted release with time served in two murders, died of kidney failure in 1997, age 44.

The convictions of Dosti and Reza Eslaminia were overturned in 2000.

== Levin survival theory ==
Hunt maintains that Levin's con artistry extends to having faked his own death since no body was found in the case. At the time of his disappearance, Levin was free on bail and awaiting trial and Hunt's defense team argued that Levin left the country to escape a pending FBI investigation into his financial misdeeds.

After Hunt's conviction, eight witnesses came forward stating they had seen Ron Levin alive in various locations in 1986 and 1987, including Greece and Los Angeles. One witness, Nadia Ghaleb, who was acquainted with Levin, testified she saw him getting into a car on San Vicente Boulevard in West Los Angeles; another, Ivan Werner, who worked as a funeral director at Pierce Brothers Funeral Home in Westwood, testified that he saw Levin attending a funeral.

In his appeal, Hunt's defense counsel argued that key facts were withheld from jurors during his original trial for Levin's murder. These include Levin's "habit of writing large, worthless checks", his conversations with witnesses about plans to leave for New York or for Granada, Spain and a conversation with another witness requesting advice on how to dye his hair. Defense attorneys also pointed out that Levin had restructured his already-made bail arrangements to release his parents from liability and asked one witness for information about Brazilian extradition treaties. There was also a purchase made using Levin's American Express card on the day after the murder was thought to have taken place of underwear from the Brooks Brothers store in Los Angeles, where Levin was known to shop.

As of September 2018, Hunt's family has offered a $100,000 reward for evidence of Levin's whereabouts after June 6, 1984.

== Hunt's attempts to appeal his conviction ==
On the basis of multiple witness statements that Levin had been seen alive, and claims of ineffective assistance of counsel and judicial misconduct, Hunt sought to have his murder conviction overturned and get a new trial. Hunt's direct appeal was denied on July 12, 1996. In a federal habeas corpus hearing in 2004, Hunt's continuing effort to have his murder conviction overturned was revived, as the Ninth Circuit reversed a dismissal of his petition. But this appeal, too, was ultimately unsuccessful.

In June 2016, the Ninth Circuit affirmed the Central District of California's denial of Hunt's habeas corpus petition. In its affirmance, the court noted that "fairminded jurists could disagree" as to whether Hunt's trial lawyer was ineffective in his defense of Hunt, but cited the Antiterrorism and Effective Death Penalty Act of 1996's "doubly deferential lens" in its refusal to overturn the Central District's decision.

In January 2018, Hunt filed an application for commutation of his sentence, which would change it from life without possibility of parole to an indeterminate life term, which would give Hunt the opportunity to prove his rehabilitation before a parole board. The petition notes that in prison, Hunt "is a different person: a chapel assistant and law clerk", and "a voice for nonviolence". The petition also describes Hunt's in-custody record of conduct as "exceptional" and details his founding and facilitation of a men's spiritual group at the California State Prison in Sacramento where Hunt was imprisoned until 2012.

In September 2018, Hunt's family and friends launched the website FreeJoeHunt.com in support of his release. Blogs authored by Hunt, recounting his experience during the trial and since his imprisonment, regularly appear on the website. In October 2018, the Los Angeles Superior Court denied an additional habeas corpus petition.

== In popular culture ==
In 1987, NBC aired a miniseries based on the story of the Billionaire Boys Club, starring Judd Nelson as Joe Hunt, Brian McNamara as Dean Karny, and Ron Silver as Ron Levin.

On July 17, 2002, TruTV aired an episode of Dominick Dunne's Power, Privilege and Justice titled "Billionaire Boys Club", presented by author Dominick Dunne, which summarized the events surrounding the "club" and the kidnapping, murders, and trials. Investigation Discovery's Behind Mansion Walls revisited the case in the 2011 episode "Fatal Greed".

A feature film titled Billionaire Boys Club starring Ansel Elgort as Joe Hunt, Taron Egerton as Dean Karny, and Kevin Spacey as Ron Levin was released in 2018. Judd Nelson, who played Hunt in the 1987 miniseries, played Hunt's father.

The true-crime podcast series Hollywood & Crime, narrated by actor Timothy Olyphant, covered the subject in the summer of 2020.

The lyrics of the song "Things To Do Today" by the Chicago band Big Black are a verbatim to-do list entered as evidence in the BBC trial.

In 2025, CNN aired the four part television documentary series Billionaire Boys Club.

== See also ==
- Crime in Los Angeles
- List of murder convictions without a body
- Billionaire Boys Club (clothing retailer)
