= The Wheel of Time Roleplaying Game =

Tabletop role-playing game

The Wheel of Time Roleplaying Game is a role-playing game based on The Wheel of Time, an epic fantasy series by American author Robert Jordan.

== History ==
The team at Last Unicorn Games created the licensed role-playing game The Wheel of Time Roleplaying Game which was published in 2001 by Wizards of the Coast after they purchased Last Unicorn. The game was published in November 2001.

The game consists of two publications by Wizards of the Coast, a core rulebook published in October 2001 and an expansion, The Prophecies of the Dragon, which followed in April 2002. Shortly after the release of Prophecies of the Dragon, Wizards of the Coast confirmed that they would not be proceeding with any further expansions for the game. The roleplaying game rights have since reverted to the estate of Robert Jordan.

== The rulebook ==
The core rulebook is a 317-page large-format hardcover book. It was written and compiled by Charles Ryan, Steven Long, Christian Moore and Owen K.C. Stephens for Wizards of the Coast. Robert Jordan served as a creative consultant and contributed an introduction, in which he revealed that he used to serve as Dungeon Master in Dungeons & Dragons games played by his stepson Will and his friends. The book has a cover by Darrell K. Sweet, who also provides the covers for the novels, and maps by Ellisa Mitchell, who likewise provides cartography for the novels. A large number of artists provide full-color art throughout the book.

The rulebook is based on the D20 rules system used by the third edition of Dungeons & Dragons, also published by Wizards of the Coast, and follows a similar layout and format to the D&D core rulebooks. However, the term 'Dungeon Master' is not used (as this is reserved for D&D products only), being replaced by the more generic 'gamemaster' to refer to the player running the game.

=== Backgrounds and character classes ===
The game does not use different races, as in the novels there are only two sentient, naturally-evolved species, namely humans and Ogier (optional rules for playing an Ogier are provided). Instead, different backgrounds are provided which serve a similar function. These are Aiel, Atha'an Miere (Sea Folk), Borderlander, Cairhienin, Domani, Ebou Dari, Illianer, Midlander (principally a native of Andor but also Far Madding, Ghealdan, Murandy, Amadicia and northern Altara), Tar Valoner, Taraboner and Tairen.

The standard D&D character classes have been replaced by new ones: algai'd'siswai (Aiel spear-carrier), Armsman (soldier), Initiate (in the Aes Sedai or other-culture counterparts, or Asha'man), Noble, Wanderer, Wilder (untrained user of the One Power) or Woodsman (similar to a D&D Ranger). It is also possible to multiclass (having different levels in different classes).

The Wheel of Time Roleplaying Game also shares D&D 3rd Edition's use of prestige classes, which add additional abilities to the existing classes. The prestige classes used in the Wheel of Time Roleplaying Game are: Aes Sedai, Asha'man, Blademaster, Commander (military officer), Gleeman, Thief-Taker, Warder, Windfinder, Wise One and Wolfbrother.

=== Feats and skills ===
The use of Feats and Skills is similar to D&D 3rd Edition. However, specialist feats allowing the use of the One Power also exist. There are also special 'Lost Ability' Feats that can be used to replicate abilities in the books, such as talking to wolves (like Perrin Aybara and Elyas Machera), viewing the future (like Min Farshaw), dreamwalking, foretelling, and the ability to 'sniff' out violence (as Hurin, in The Great Hunt).

=== Other sections ===
There is a chapter discussing equipment and weaponry, a further chapter discussing how to run and play Wheel of Time Roleplaying Game adventures, and notes on using characters from the series as non-player characters. There is also an extensive chapter discussing rules for the use of the One Power (including how to handle male channellers and the threat of madness).

=== Setting and background information ===
There is a lengthy section about the setting and history of The Wheel of Time, much of which comes from the novels and The World of Robert Jordan's The Wheel of Time. However, there is information included which is unique to this product, including the exact circumstances under which countries such as the Borderlands, Cairhien, Illian, Tarabon, and Tear were founded during the War of the Hundred Years.

=== Maps ===
The book features re-drawn, full-color, and larger-scaled maps of the cities of Ebou Dar, Caemlyn, Cairhien, and Tar Valon. Maps of these cities previously appeared in the novels. The maps of Tanchico and Far Madding from the books are not reprinted. Of greater interest are the never-before-seen maps of the capital cities of Tear and Illian. There is also another map of the main continent, similar to the one found in the hardcovers of the later novels.

=== Introductory adventure ===
There is an adventure called 'What Follows in Shadow', set during the events of The Eye of the World, which features the adventuring party running afoul of Padan Fain during the procession of Logain Ablar through the city. The adventure ends with the adventurers lost in the Ways, ready for the events of The Prophecies of the Dragon adventure book.

== Web enhancement ==
A web enhancement for the game was released on the Wizards of the Coast website at the same time the book was published. This short downloadable file contained a few new Feats and channeling abilities, information on new NPCs, and background information on the countries of Ghealdan, Mayene, and Murandy (including new information on their histories not found elsewhere). This web enhancement is no longer available through the Wizards of the Coast website.

== Dragon Magazine ==
Dragon Annual #6 2001, included new content for the RPG. Two articles were presented in the magazine, content included beasts of the wheel of time and new hero templates for quick character creation.

== Prophecies of the Dragon ==
Prophecies of the Dragon is the only expansion to The Wheel of Time Roleplaying Game that was published. It is a 191-page large-format softcover book. It was written by Aaron Acevedo, Evan Jamieson, Michelle Lyons, James Maliszewski, Charles Ryan and Paul Sudlow for Wizards of the Coast. Again, cartography was handled by Ellisa Mitchell, and a new cover was produced by Darrell K. Sweet. Robert Jordan is listed as a creative consultant.

=== Concept ===
The concept behind the book is to provide a massive roleplaying campaign that runs alongside the storyline of the first six Wheel of Time novels. The campaign is broken into a series of five major episodes with a number of smaller 'mini-adventures' leading into the campaign or to serve as diversions between the main adventures. Robert Jordan has ruled the new information revealed in the book about certain characters (namely Mazrim Taim) non-canonical.

=== Mini-adventures ===
The mini-adventures are designed to get the players from wherever they ended up at the end of the 'What Follows in Shadow' adventure in the RPG core rulebook to where the longer campaign begins, on Toman Head, or to serve as interludes in the main campaign. The first mini-adventure, 'Howls in the Night', sees the players investigating a series of wolf attacks on a remote village. 'Escort Duty' has them escorting a wealthy merchant to the Murandian capital of Lugard. In 'Hunters for the Horn' reports emerge that the Horn of Valere can be found in the Hills of Kintara and the PCs are drawn into the search for the artifact. 'The Watchtower' sees the PCs taking on a Draghkar which has set up a lair in a watchtower overlooking the road from Tarabon to Arad Doman. 'My Secret Friend', set after the Seanchan invasion, has the PCs investigating the disappearance of a young boy who is trying to nurse a lopar back to health, and getting involved with Shadowspawn sent to spy on the Seanchan advance. 'I Want to Stay Single' has the PCs hired by the son of the mayor of Ostin Falls, a town on the border between Toman Head and Almoth Plain, who is evading an arranged marriage by investigating reports of fighting on Toman Head. This adventure can also act as a springboard into the main campaign.

=== The main campaign ===
The main campaign consists of five sequential, serialized adventures.

- 'Toman Head' has the adventurers employed by an Aes Sedai to investigate reports of unusual events taking place in the city of Falme. This adventure has the adventurers becoming involved in the climax of the novel The Great Hunt.
- 'Winter of Discontent' takes the adventurers from Falme to Arad Doman (where they run afoul of Jaichim Carridin and the Black Ajah) and then to Saldaea where they have to free the false Dragon Mazrim Taim from the Red Ajah, which results in Taim owing them a favor. This adventure takes place during the events of The Dragon Reborn and The Shadow Rising.
- 'The Two Rivers' features the adventurers pursuing the Black Ajah sisters south into the Two Rivers, where they become involved in the battle with the Trollocs and Children of the Light as detailed in The Shadow Rising. This is the first time the adventurers have to interact with major characters from the book, namely Loial and Verin Mathwin.
- 'The Ancient City' continues the journey, with the adventurers pursuing the Black Ajah sisters into the wilds south of Emond's Field and eventually to the ruined Manetheren city of Jara'copan, where the Black Ajah hopes to find a ter'angreal of enormous power called the Artifice of Brassion, a device which bestows upon an Aes Sedai powers only capable of normally when linking. Thus a single sister using the Artifice can sever or gentle any male channeler by herself. This episode is designed so that the adventurers cannot stop the Black sisters from securing the Artifice for use against Rand al'Thor.
- 'Dumai's Wells' has the adventurers pursuing the Black Ajah sisters to Cairhien, then becoming involved in the plot to kidnap Rand al'Thor by the White Tower delegation (as depicted in the novel Lord of Chaos). According to the adventure, it is the players who alert Mazrim Taim and the Asha'man to the threat to Rand and Taim, repaying the favor he owes them from earlier, takes them with him to the Battle of Dumai's Wells. Whilst the rest of the battle is being fought, the adventurers confront and defeat the Black Ajah sisters and capture or destroy the Artifice of Brassion.

The campaign concludes at this point. Given that the players will have likely reached the attention of Rand himself by the end of the campaign, it falls to the gamemaster to decide what adventures follow through the remainder of the novels.

=== Maps ===
Prophecies of the Dragon features a number of new maps, including the towns of Aturo's Orchard and Tobin's Hollow on Toman Head (all created for this book), plus the city of Falme and a general map of the western coast of the continent, stretching from Tanchico to Bandar Eban. The town of Denhuir in Saldaea is also shown. The map of the Two Rivers from The Eye of the World is reprinted in full color as well. Finally, there are maps showing the Battle of Emond's Field from The Shadow Rising and the Battle of Dumai's Wells from Lord of Chaos.

== Reviews ==
- Pyramid
- Black Gate #4
- Backstab #36
- Coleção Dragão Brasil
- Syfy
- Realms of Fantasy
