= Lanfear =

Fictional character in the Wheel of Time series

- The Wheel of Time character
- Natasha O'Keeffe as Lanfear in The Wheel of Time
- First appearance: Literature: The Great Hunt (1990); Television: The Wheel of Time; "Strangers and Friends" (2023)
- Last appearance: Literature: A Memory of Light (2013); Television: The Wheel of Time; "He Who Comes with the Dawn" (2025)
- Created by: Robert Jordan
- Adapted by: Rafe Judkins
- Portrayed by: Natasha O'Keeffe

In-universe information
- Aliases: Selene; Mierin Eronaile; Daughter of the Night
- Gender: Female
- Occupation: Researcher at the Collam Daan; TV series: Innkeeper (as Selene)
- Affiliation: Forsaken

Lanfear is a fictional character in the Wheel of Time fantasy novel series by American author Robert Jordan, and its television adaptation. She is introduced as the mysterious Selene in the 1990 novel The Great Hunt, and is later revealed to be Lanfear, one of the Forsaken, ancient servants of the malevolent Dark One. In the series, Lanfear is obsessed with Rand al'Thor, the reincarnation of Lews Therin Telamon, her lover from 3,000 years prior who had ultimately spurned her, before imprisoning her with the other Forsaken for the intervening millennia.

Lanfear is portrayed by Natasha O'Keeffe in the Wheel of Time television series adaptation, first appearing in the September 2023 episode "Strangers and Friends".

== Novels ==
Lanfear is introduced as the mysterious Selene in the 1990 novel The Great Hunt, and is later revealed to be Lanfear, one of the Forsaken, ancient servants of the malevolent Dark One. In the series, Lanfear is obsessed with Rand al'Thor, the reincarnation of Lews Therin Telamon, her lover from 3,000 years prior who had ultimately spurned her, before imprisoning her with the other Forsaken for the intervening millennia.

=== Description ===
Screen Rant called Lanfear "one of the most important villains" in the series. She is one of the most powerful of the Forsaken, ancient Aes Sedai who became servants of the Dark One during the so-called Age of Legends. In addition to the ability to channel the One Power, she possesses mastery of Tel'aran'rhiod, the World of Dreams. She is known for psychological torture, entering people's dreams and tormenting them. Multiple characters describe Lanfear as the most beautiful woman they have ever seen.

Originally known as Mierin Eronaile, Lanfear was in a romantic relationship with Lews Therin Telamon, a powerful male channeler known as the Dragon. As he learned the extent of her ambition and pursuit of power, Lews came to believe that she loved his strength in the One Power, and not him. Mierin was furious, jealous and resentful when Lews fell in love with Ilyena Moerelle Dalisar and married her. As a researcher at the Collam Daan, Mierin discovered a new Source of power. Unlike the One Power, which is divided between male and female channelers, this new Source could be wielded by both men and women. Not realizing that it was the Dark One's dangerous True Power, Mierin and her colleagues inadvertently drilled a bore into the Dark One's prison. Though he was not freed, his influence began to seep out into the world, corrupting it.

As the power of the Dark One's forces grew, Mierin reinvented herself as Lanfear, and pledged her loyalty to the Dark One in her lust for greater power. As one of his most powerful servants and unmatched within Tel'aran'rhiod, she also became known as the Daughter of the Night. She and the 12 most powerful of the Dark One's channelers joined as the Forsaken, and fought for the Dark One in the War of Power against Lews and his army of Aes Sedai. Lews led 99 male Aes Sedai in a surprise attack on Shayol Ghul, resealing the Dark One's prison and sealing Lanfear and the Forsaken with him in a timeless, dreamless sleep. Three thousand years later, the Seven Seals of the Dark One's prison have weakened, and the Forsaken begin to reenter the world, presenting a new threat and paving the way for their master.

Michael Ahr of Den of Geek noted that Lanfear is introduced as "a manipulative temptress and one of the most beautiful women in history". In the guise of Selene, Lanfear appears in The Great Hunt (1990) as a damsel in distress who transports Rand to another world simply so that he can "rescue" her, and she can ingratiate herself with him. In later novels, she uses her powers of disguise to become what Ahr calls "a much more complex villain". In The Dragon Reborn (1991), Rand rebuffs Lanfear's invitation to rule the world at her side in service of the Dark One, but she remains committed to getting him back. Lanfear exhibits a possessiveness of Rand and intolerance of his involvement with other women, a jealousy which drives her to attempt kill him in The Fires of Heaven (1993).

=== The Great Hunt (1990) ===
Lanfear as Selene, as depicted on the 2004 cover of The Hunt Begins, part one of The Great Hunt as repackaged in two volumes. Art by Charles Keegan.

In The Great Hunt (1990), a newly-written prophecy indicates that the Forsaken known as Lanfear walks the world again, seeking a new lover. Moiraine Damodred is concerned because 3,000 years before, Lanfear was the lover of the Dragon, Lews Therin Telamon, the male channeler of immense power responsible for the Breaking of the World. Moiraine is one of the few people aware that Rand al'Thor is the Dragon Reborn, the reincarnation of Lews, and therefore a likely draw for Lanfear. Rand is in pursuit of the Darkfriend Padan Fain, who has stolen the Horn of Valere, when he is transported to a distorted, alternate world by a Portal Stone. He and his companions come upon the mysterious Selene and rescue her from an attack by a strange beast called a grolm. She leads Rand and his party to another Portal Stone, encouraging him to channel to activate it. He reluctantly does so, returning them to the real world. Rand retrieves the Horn, and Selene suggests he keep it for himself, and she will stay with him forever. She is annoyed when he declines, saying the Horn does not belong to him. Selene continues to praise him and encourage him to seek glory, ultimately disappearing in Cairhien. Later in Falme, Min Farshaw finds an unconscious Rand, who has killed the Forsaken Ba'alzamon but allowed himself to be grievously wounded to do so. Selene appears and says to Min, "Lews Therin was and is mine, girl. Tend him well for me until I come for him."

=== The Dragon Reborn (1991) ===
Lanfear is all powerful in Tel'aran'rhiod, the World of Dreams, and visits Perrin Aybara and Mat Cauthon there as Selene in The Dragon Reborn (1991). Perrin dismisses her talk of pursuing glory for himself. Later, she is surprised to see him in the dream realm, having entered on his own, but as a wolfbrother he has power there as well. Lanfear warns Mat that he is important, and that the Aes Sedai will try to use him. She assures him she is not Aes Sedai or a follower of Ba'alzamon, and he needs to trust her if he wants to survive. Lanfear impersonates Else Grinwell and appears to Egwene al'Vere, Nynaeve al'Meara and Elayne Trakand to manipulate their investigation into the Black Ajah. In Tel'aran'rhiod, Perrin witnesses a meeting of Darkfriends, summoned there by Ba'alzamon, who is annoyed with their lack of progress. Selene reveals herself as Lanfear and confirms her loyalty to the Dark One, as she and Ba'alzamon criticize each other's plans and accomplishments.

=== The Shadow Rising (1992) ===
Lanfear appears to Rand as Selene at the Stone of Tear in The Shadow Rising (1992), and reveals her identity as one of the Forsaken. Impressed with how he has matured, she has come to claim him. Rand shocks both of them when memories from Lews surface that tell him she loves power more than she loves him. She has shielded him from being able to channel in her presence, but lays out her plans for him. The Forsaken Asmodean has agreed to teach him, before other Forsaken can come to destroy him. They fear that the Dark One will place Rand above them. Shadowspawn attack the Stone of Tear, including deadly, eyeless Fades; humanoid monster Trollocs; and Gray Men assassins. Lanfear reminds Rand of the power of the crystal sword Callandor while mocking his lack of training. Using the sword to generate a lightning storm, Rand destroys all of the remaining Shadowspawn at once. Rand travels to declare himself the prophesied messiah of the Aiel known as Car'a'carn, the "Chief of Chiefs", unknowingly accompanied by Lanfear and Asmodean in disguise as the peddler Keille Shaogi and the gleeman Jasin Natael. Lanfear is shocked when, in a confrontation with Asmodean, Rand severs Asmodean's connection with the Dark One. Rand's memories of Lanfear's backstory as the Aes Sedai researcher Mierin Eronaile in the Age of Legends are triggered. Mierin and several other Aes Sedai attempted to access what they believed was a new, untapped source of power, which turned out to be the essence of the Dark One. They inadvertently drilled what became known as the Bore into his prison, weakening the seals and allowing his influence to begin to seep out. In the present, Asmodean, shielded by Lanfear from using his full power, commits to training Rand.

=== The Fires of Heaven (1993) ===
In The Fires of Heaven (1993), Lanfear meets with the Forsaken Graendal, Rahvin and Sammael to discuss what can be done to bring Rand over to the Shadow. Subsequently, the news that Rand has slept with Aviendha, an Aiel Maiden of the Spear, sends Lanfear into a murderous rage, and she destroys the Darkfriend who told her. Lanfear confronts Rand and his companions at the docks in Cairhien, killing multiple bystanders with channeled waves of fire. Rand prevents her from killing Egwene and Aviendha, but they are badly injured, as are Moiraine and her Warder, Lan Mandragoran. Face to face with Rand, Lanfear finally decides to kill him when he swears he will never love a woman sworn to the Shadow. She declares, "If you are not mine you are dead", and overwhelms him thanks to an angreal bracelet, Rand's inability to harm a woman, and her own rage. Just as Rand is about to die, Moiraine intervenes, pushing Lanfear and herself through a twisted redstone doorway, a powerful ter'angreal which leads to the world of the foxlike Eelfinn. The doorway melts immediately, and Moiraine and Lanfear are presumed dead.

=== Towers of Midnight (2010) ===
In Towers of Midnight (2010), Rand sees Lanfear in a dream. She is screaming and begs him to help her escape from torture, but then vanishes.

=== A Memory of Light (2013) ===
In A Memory of Light (2013), Lanfear finally accepts that she has no hold over Rand, and that he never loved her. Consumed with a renewed hatred for Rand, she turns her attentions to Perrin. She helps him in his hunt of the creature Slayer, and other endeavors. She ultimately lays a weave of Compulsion on him, compelling him to kill Moiraine while Lanfear kills Nynaeve, giving Lanfear the opportunity to seize Callandor and kill Rand with it. Perrin, however, is able to circumvent the Compulsion and snap Lanfear's neck.

Brandon Sanderson, the co-author of the last three novels in the series after Jordan's 2007 death, said in 2023 that Lanfear survives this encounter. She allows herself to be presumed dead to avoid any repercussions from the victorious forces of the Light.

== Other works ==
The companion book The World of Robert Jordan's The Wheel of Time (1997) explains that Mierin and Lews had been lovers before he spurned her due to her unbridled ambition, and married Ilyena Moerelle Dalisar. All attempts to win him back failed, pushing her to join the Shadow for power, immortality and possibly another chance with Lews.

== Television adaptation ==
A television adaptation, The Wheel of Time, was announced by Sony Pictures Television in April 2017, and a series order by Amazon Prime Video was reported in October 2018. In May 2021, Amazon renewed the series for a second season ahead of the series premiere. Season one premiered in November 2021.

The casting of Natasha O'Keeffe in the role of Lanfear for season two was announced in October 2021. The second season premiered in September 2023, and O'Keeffe first appeared in the episode "Strangers and Friends". The third season premiered on March 13, 2025, and the series was canceled in May 2025.

=== Character ===
Michael Ahr of Den of Geek called Lanfear's introduction "a storytelling upgrade from page to screen" that "gives added agency to an important character." Though the character is still motivated by her desire to win over Rand al'Thor for herself and for the Dark One, Ahr explained that in the series, "the means she uses to accomplish that goal communicate a lot about her depth of character". Showrunner Rafe Judkins said of Lanfear, "We just tried to humanize her in every way we could because a lot of her stuff in the books is a little bit more straight-down-the-middle evil early on. By the end of the book series, you really come to understand who she is as a woman, which makes her lovable even when she's doing horrible things. We tried to bring that and put it all in season two."

In the series, Moiraine Damodred (Rosamund Pike) calls Lanfear "the most dangerous of the Forsaken". In "Daes Dae'mar", Lanfear is able to revive after her throat is slit by Moiraine, and she is subsequently depicted as more powerful than any of the Aes Sedai, including their leader, Siuan Sanche (Sophie Okonedo), known as the Amyrlin Seat. Lanfear is strong and ruthless, a master manipulator, and unhindered by the Three Oaths, which keep the Aes Sedai from lying, or using their powers to harm innocents. Though her fellow Forsaken, Ishamael (Fares Fares), is more powerful than she, Lanfear is willing to betray him to achieve her ambitions for herself and Rand (Josha Stradowski).

Unlike in the novels, Lanfear and Rand are shown to be in a sexual relationship. Initially posing as innkeeper Selene, Lanfear hopes to bind his loyalty and seduce him to the Shadow. Christian Holub of Entertainment Weekly wrote that "The unexpected romance blossoming between Lanfear and Rand ... was one of the most fun elements of season two." Judkins said:

Is [Lanfear] trying to recapture love with this man she loved three thousand years ago? Is she starting to fall for Rand, or does she hate Rand and only love the pieces of him that are Lews? That is so interesting and complicated ... In the books. I don't know if you ever believe Rand's going to be with Lanfear. But we felt like for that character to work in the visual medium of television, you needed to be able to believe that there's some chance that those two could end up together."

Stradowski said in 2023:

My secret hope is that Rand and Lanfear end up together ... that's quite different from the source material. But it's definitely an interesting idea that I think we're playing with, because she is one of the very few people that actually understands him, and also one of the very few people that doesn't really try to control him, or doesn't have a certain idea of who he needs to be. Of course, she has her agenda, [and] she brings this darkness out of him, but ... it's also that he brings out the light in her."

=== Storyline ===
==== Season 2 ====
In the season two episode "Strangers and Friends", Rand al'Thor is living in obscurity in Cairhien, knowing that as the Dragon Reborn, hunted by minions of the Dark One, his presence endangers his loved ones. He is romantically involved with the beautiful innkeeper Selene (O'Keeffe), from whom he hides his ability to channel the One Power. Rand and Selene sneak into a high society party in "What Might Be" and inadvertently meet Anvaere Damodred (Lindsay Duncan), the aristocrat sister of Moiraine Damodred, the Aes Sedai who picked Rand out of obscurity. Struggling to control the flow of the One Power through him, he accidentally burns down Selene's inn during the night. In "Daughter of the Night", Moiraine has become aware that Ishamael and Lanfear, two of the most powerful of the Dark One's Forsaken, have been freed from their magical captivity. Rand and Selene are attacked by a Fade, a horrifying, eyeless and deadly creature who serves the Dark One. Rand kills it with the One Power, and confesses his love for Selene. She chooses to stay with him despite his ability to channel, which is taboo for men. Just as Selene begins to reveal her own channeling abilities to Rand in bed, Moiraine arrives, given Rand's location by her sister Anvaere. She impales Selene and slits her throat, revealing to a shocked Rand that Selene is Lanfear. Rand and Moiraine flee as Lanfear begins to stir.

Rand and Moiraine evade Lanfear in "Damane", and take refuge with Anvaere. Ishamael, who is spearheading the efforts to free the Dark One from his prison, asks Lanfear if she will betray him, and she admits she probably will. Moiraine knows that Lanfear was in love with Lews Therin Telamon, the original incarnation of the Dragon, and considering she has not killed him during the months they have been together, Rand believes that the connection between him and Lanfear is real. Rand falls asleep and enters Tel'aran'rhiod, the World of Dreams, where Lanfear is all powerful, hoping to learn what she and Ishamael are planning. Upon entering, Rand finds himself immediately captured by a waiting Lanfear. In "Eyes Without Pity", Lanfear tries to convince Rand to join her by promising to protect him from Ishamael, and showing him that his ex-lover, Egwene al'Vere (Madeleine Madden), is a captive of the Seanchan in Falme. She also threatens to kill Moiraine if she sees Rand with her.

Rand is a captive of the Aes Sedai in "Daes Dae'mar", and persuades Lanfear to help him escape and get to Falme. She assaults the Foregate of Cairhien as a distraction, allowing Moiraine and her Warder Lan Mandragoran (Daniel Henney) to escape with Rand. They are tracked by Siuan Sanche, the Aes Sedai's Amyrlin Seat, before they can leave the city, but Lanfear ambushes Siuan, easily overcomes her, and opens a Waygate. In "What Was Meant to Be", Lanfear and Rand arrive in Falme, where Rand confronts and kills the Seanchan High Lord Turak (Daniel Francis) and his men. This alerts Ishamael to Rand's presence, and the realization that Lanfear has betrayed him. After Rand destroys Ishamael, Lanfear moves to make sure the rest of the Forsaken cannot be freed, but is confronted by the Forsaken Moghedien (Laia Costa). Lanfear is shocked to learn that Ishamael anticipated her betrayal, and already freed all of the remaining Forsaken.

==== Season 3 ====
In "To Race the Shadow", both Moiraine and Lanfear urge Rand to travel to the Stone of Tear to claim the sword Callandor, a powerful artifact which amplifies the One Power. Surrounded by his friends, Rand resists, so Moiraine allows Lanfear to covertly launch a series of magical attacks on the group to spook them into separating. An unknown assassin nearly kills Nynaeve, and a shocked Lanfear explains that the undead killer, a Gray Man, was sent by another Forsaken. It is later revealed that Moghedien possesses the unique power to create Gray Men. Lanfear continues to visit Rand in his dreams in "A Question of Crimson", and creates nightmares for Egwene in which Lanfear physically attacks her in the form of her Seanchan torturer, Renna, leaving wounds in the real world.

In "Seeds of Shadow", Lanfear meets with the Forsaken Rahvin (Nuno Lopes) and Sammael (Cameron Jack) to suggest an alliance among them against the dangerous Moghedien. A sulky Lanfear reveals to Rand that she could potentially break her oaths to the Dark One if they can kill him, which she indicates is possible if she uses the female-aligned sa'angreal Sakarnen in tandem with Rand wielding the male-aligned Callandor. In "The Road to the Spear", Rand undergoes a supernatural trial in Rhuidean to prove he is the Aiel messiah. He relives the lives of his ancestors, including those of the Aiel man Charn, who was in the service of Mierin Eronaile and witnessed the destructive breaking of the seals to the Dark One's prison. Meanwhile, Moiraine undergoes her own trial in Rhuidean, and discovers Sakarnen hidden there.

In "Tel'aran'rhiod", Lanfear attacks Egwene again in her dreams, and then visits Rand. He tells her he sees the goodness of Mierin in her, and she confesses that she is in love with him. They kiss. Egwene visits the happy dreams of all of her friends, and is horrified to find Lanfear with Rand. With Ishamael dead, Lanfear asserts her dominance over Liandrin Guirale (Kate Fleetwood) in "The Shadow in the Night", and warns her that Rahvin has likely approached one of her fellow Black Ajah. Lanfear visits Moiraine, reminding her to keep Egwene away from Rand. Though the Wise Ones Bair (Nukâka Coster-Waldau) and Melaine (Salóme Gunnarsdóttir) try to teach her to resist Lanfear in Tel'aran'rhiod, Egwene remains powerless against her. Lanfear lies to Egwene that Rand is aware she is assaulting Egwene.

Having learned of Lanfear's torture of Egwene, Rand rejects Lanfear in "He Who Comes with the Dawn", calling her power-hungry, jealous, petty and cruel. Enraged, she allies with Rahvin against him, and positions Couladin (Set Sjöstrand), leader of the Shaido Aiel, as a fake Car'a'carn to oppose Rand. Moiraine and Lan fight Lanfear, who is seriously wounded and flees.

=== Reception ===
Jamie Parker of Comic Book Resources noted that Lanfear has made a "huge impact" on the events of season two, and wrote that the series "has only further elevated an already spectacular character." He wrote that O'Keeffe "has truly captured the spirit of the character" adding that "Lanfear is supposed to be as terrifying as she is beautiful, and Prime Video have hit that mark perfectly."
