= A Crown of Swords =

1996 novel by Robert Jordan

- Original cover of A Crown of Swords, showing Rand al'Thor standing in Shadar Logoth
- Author: Robert Jordan
- Cover artist: Darrell K. Sweet; Tyler Jacobson (2013 Edition)
- Language: English
- Series: The Wheel of Time
- Genre: Fantasy
- Published: 1996 (Tor Books/U.S. and Orbit/UK)
- Publication place: United States
- Media type: Print (hardback & paperback)
- Pages: 881 (U.S. paperback edition) & 720 (U.S. hardback edition)
- ISBN: 0-312-85767-5 (US hardback edition)
- OCLC: 33819178
- Dewey Decimal: 813/.54 20
- LC Class: PS3560.O7617 C76 1996
- Preceded by: Lord of Chaos
- Followed by: The Path of Daggers

A Crown of Swords was the first Wheel of Time book for which the cover of the first paperback edition, shown here, did not use the same art as the hardcover edition.

A Crown of Swords is a fantasy novel by American author Robert Jordan, the seventh book of The Wheel of Time. It was published by Tor Books and released on May 15, 1996. A Crown of Swords consists of a prologue and 41 chapters.

== Plot summary ==
Cairhien

In the aftermath of the Battle Of Dumai's Wells, Rand al'Thor returns to Cairhien to find the noblewoman Colavaere has crowned herself Queen. Deposing and exhiling her, Rand begins a romantic relationship with Min Farshaw. While ruling in Cairhein, Rand is approached by the Aes Sedai Cadsuane, who reveals she knows Rand has been hearing voices and promises to guide him, whether he wishes for it or not.

Realising that his friend is in danger, Rand publicly "banishes" Perrin in a staged argument to hide his true mission: sending Perrin south to Ghealdan to deal with the Prophet (Masema Dagar) and bring the region under the Dragon Reborn's control.

Following a near-fatal attack by Padan Fain (where he is saved by Cadsuane and the Asha'man), Rand then marches on Illian with the Asha'man. He battles and destroys the Forsaken Sammael in Shadar Logoth, and accepts the crown of Illian—historically the Laurel Crown, now renamed the Crown of Swords.

Salidar

Egwene al'Vere and Siuan Sanche attempt to manipulate the Aes Sedai in Salidar against Elaida's Aes Sedai in the White Tower.

Investigating Myrelle Berengari, Egwene exploits the transfer of Lan Mandragoran's Warder bond from Moiraine to Myrelle, to force Myrelle and Nisao to swear fealty to her. Egwene then sends Lan south to reunite with Nyneave.

Ebou Dar

In the city of Ebou Dar in Altara, Elayne Trakand, Nynaeve al'Meara, Aviendha, and Mat Cauthon search for a ter'angreal, the Bowl of the Winds, to break the unnatural heat brought by the Dark One's manipulation of climate.

Following an attack by Moghedien, Nynaeve is saved by and reunites with Lan. Swearing their love for one another, Nynaeve finds that her block on channelling has been broken. Lan and Nynaeve are then married in a hasty ceremony.

The group locate the Bowl of the Winds. During the recovery, Mat saves Nynaeve from the Black Ajah and encounters the Gholam—a deadly shadowspawn immune to channeling—but repels it using his foxhead medallion. As Elayne, Nynaeve and the others flee the city with the Bowl, Mat stays behind to look for Olver. While searching, the Seanchan launch a surprise invasion of Ebou Dar. Mat is severely injured when a building collapses on him, leaving him trapped in the occupied city.

== Reception ==
Andy Butcher reviewed A Crown of Swords for Arcane magazine, rating it a 7 out of 10 overall, and stated that "The story has lost the sense of urgency and tension that made the first three so readable, and Jordan falls into the trap of spending too much time on unimportant details and minor sideplots. A Crown of Swords is still a cut above a lot of fantasy, but the pace needs to be picked up. It would probably help if Jordan set himself (and his readers) a goal by disclosing just how many books there will be in the series - at the moment you get the distinct impression that it could run forever, becoming more meandering and aimless as time goes by."

== Reviews ==
- Review [French] by Henri Lœvenbruck, Alain Névant, and Mydia Passevant (1996) in Ozone #3, Août/Octobre 96
- Review by Carolyn Cushman (1996) in Locus, #429 October 1996
- Review by Jim Seidman (1997) in SF Site, November 1997, (1997)
- Review by Joe Sherry (2024) in 2024 Hugo Voter Packet
