= List of The Wheel of Time characters =

Characters from season two of The Wheel of Time television series (2023). Center: Moiraine (Rosamund Pike). Clockwise from left: Egwene (Madeleine Madden), Nynaeve (Zoë Robins), Lan (Daniel Henney), Rand (Josha Stradowski), Perrin (Marcus Rutherford) and Mat (Dónal Finn).

The Wheel of Time is a series of high fantasy novels by American author Robert Jordan, which began with The Eye of the World in 1990. Jordan wrote the first 11 novels of the series, and the prequel novel New Spring (2004), before his death in 2007. The final three novels—The Gathering Storm (2009), Towers of Midnight (2010), and A Memory of Light (2013)—were co-written by American author Brandon Sanderson. The series features 2787 distinctly named characters.

The Wheel of Time follows the characters Rand al'Thor, Mat Cauthon, Perrin Aybara, Egwene al'Vere and Nynaeve al'Meara, teens from a remote village whose important destinies are recognized by Moiraine Damodred, a powerful member of the Aes Sedai. In this world, the pattern of human existence is determined and maintained by the cosmic Wheel of Time, which is rotated by a magical force called the One Power. Rand and his friends are among those, like the Aes Sedai, who possess the ability to channel, the term for accessing and wielding the One Power. As the series progresses, new characters join the ongoing struggle against the malevolent Dark One and his minions.

From 2021 to 2025, the first five novels were adapted into an Amazon Prime Video series, The Wheel of Time.

== Main characters ==
=== Rand al'Thor ===
Introduced in The Eye of the World (1990), Rand al'Thor is a sheep herder whose remote village Emond's Field, in the Two Rivers, is attacked by a horde of monstrous Trollocs. Rand and his friends flee with Moiraine Damodred, an Aes Sedai of the Blue Ajah who believes that one of them is the prophesied Dragon Reborn, the reincarnation of Lews Therin Telamon, a hero of the Age of Legends. The group is pursued by agents of a malevolent figure known as the Dark One, who seeks to seduce the Dragon to the Shadow, or destroy him. At the Eye of the World, Rand is exposed to a well of pure, uncorrupted saidin, the male half of the One Power. He finds himself able to channel it, and faces off against Aginor, one of the Dark One's most powerful servants, the Forsaken. Rand thus proves himself to be the Dragon Reborn, and is drawn into the millennia-long struggle against the forces of the Dark One.

The Amyrlin Seat Siuan Sanche, leader of the Aes Sedai, confirms Rand is the Dragon Reborn in The Great Hunt (1990), and Moiraine's Warder, Lan Mandragoran trains Rand in swordplay. During the hunt for the stolen Horn of Valere, Rand is transported to a distorted world where he meets the mysterious Selene, who helps him get back to the real world. Rand later defeats the High Lord Turak, leader of the Seanchan forces invading Falme, in single combat. In The Dragon Reborn (1991), Rand travels to the Stone of Tear and claims the crystal sword Callandor, a powerful sa'angreal, an artifact which amplifies the One Power. He learns that he is the son of Shaiel, an Aiel Maiden of the Spear, and Janduin, chief of the Taardad Aiel, in The Shadow Rising (1992). Selene reveals herself to be the Forsaken Lanfear, who was in love with Lews, and shares her plans to help him become all-powerful. In The Fires of Heaven (1993), however, the news that Rand has slept with the Aiel warrior Aviendha sends Lanfear into a murderous rage. She finally decides to kill Rand when he swears he will never love a woman sworn to the Shadow, but Moiraine intervenes. Rand's mother, Shaiel, is later revealed to be Tigraine Mantear, daughter of the then-Queen of Andor. In Lord of Chaos (1994), Rand founds the Asha'man, male counterparts to the Aes Sedai who are trained at the Black Tower, a converted farmhouse near Caemlyn. In A Crown of Swords (1996), Rand defeats the Forsaken Sammael and takes the crown of Illian.

In Towers of Midnight (2010), Rand conceives a controversial plan to shatter the remaining seals on the Dark One's prison in order to recreate a strong and uncorrupted one. Rand confronts the Dark One in A Memory of Light (2013), and they realize they must coexist because the Pattern requires them both. Logain Ablar breaks open the Dark One's prison, and Rand uses a unique weave of saidin, saidar and the Dark One's True Power combined, to first capture the Dark One, and then recreate his prison without flaw.

Rand is portrayed by Josha Stradowski in the Wheel of Time television adaptation.

=== Mat Cauthon ===
Matrim "Mat" Cauthon is a mischievous farm boy who, as a possible reincarnation of the Dragon, flees Emond's Field with Rand and his other friends in The Eye of the World. Chased by emissaries of the Dark One, the group shelters in the cursed city of Shadar Logoth, from which Mat takes a ruby dagger. The weapon, corrupted by the malevolent entity that has taken hold of the city, begins to taint Mat, debilitating his body and infusing him with hostility and paranoia. Mat joins the hunt for the stolen Horn of Valere in The Great Hunt, and eventually blows it to summon a group of legendary heroes from the dead to defeat the Seanchan forces invading Falme. Near death in The Dragon Reborn, Mat is freed from the taint of the dagger by the Aes Sedai at the White Tower in Tar Valon. In The Shadow Rising, the snakelike Aelfinn foretell that Mat will marry "the Daughter of the Nine Moons", and the foxlike Eelfinn grant him memories of his past lives before hanging him from the Tree of Life, leaving his neck forever scarred. He later founds Shen an Calhar, the Band of the Red Hand, and leads as its Marshal General. Mat escapes from Seanchan-occupied city of Ebou Dar in Winter's Heart (2000), kidnapping the High Lady Tuon, heir to the Seanchan Crystal Throne, when he learns she is known as the Daughter of the Nine Moons. He courts her in Crossroads of Twilight (2003) and they marry in Knife of Dreams (2005), with Mat gaining the title "Prince of the Ravens".

Mat is portrayed by Barney Harris in season one of the Wheel of Time television series adaptation, and by Dónal Finn in seasons two and three.

=== Perrin Aybara ===
Perrin Aybara, a blacksmith and woodworker in Emond's Field, is also possibly the Dragon Reborn, and leaves the village with his friends and Moiraine Damodred in The Eye of the World. Perrin and Egwene al'Vere are separated from the group as they flee the cursed city of Shadar Logoth, and meet the tracker Elyas Machera. Elyas informs Perrin that he is, like Elyas, a wolfbrother: a man able to communicate telepathically with wolves. Possessing golden, wolf-like eyes, wolfbrothers have heightened senses, strength and speed, and tend toward aggressive, animalistic behavior in battle. They also can navigate Tel'aran'rhiod, the World of Dreams.

Perrin is portrayed by Marcus Rutherford in the Wheel of Time television series adaptation.

=== Egwene al'Vere ===
Egwene al'Vere is the daughter of the mayor of Emond's Field, and romantically involved with Rand al'Thor in The Eye of the World. The Aes Sedai Moiraine Damodred recognizes in Egwene the "spark" of one who is able to channel the One Power, and Egwene joins the group fleeing the village to escape the Shadowspawn who are hunting the Dragon Reborn. She joins the White Tower of the Aes Sedai as a novice in The Great Hunt. She and Nynaeve al'Meara, her friend from Emond's Field and a fellow novice, hear news that Rand is in trouble in Falme. They sneak out of the White Tower, joined by novice Elayne Trakand and their friend Min Farshaw. In Falme, they are betrayed by Liandrin Guirale, an Aes Sedai of the Red Ajah, and handed over to the Seanchan High Lady Suroth to be enslaved. Nynaeve and Elayne escape, but Egwene is collared with an a'dam, a device used by the Seanchan to control channelers. A captive Min is helpless to intervene in Egwene's subsequent torture, but helps Nynaeve and Elayne rescue her.

Egwene is portrayed by Madeleine Madden in the Wheel of Time television series adaptation.

=== Nynaeve al'Meara ===
In The Eye of the World, Nynaeve al'Meara is the Wisdom, or healer, of Emond's Field. In the aftermath of the Trolloc attack, she tracks her friends and joins them on their journey, learning along the way that she can channel the One Power as well. She and Egwene al'Vere become Aes Sedai novices in The Great Hunt, but are lured away to Falme by the treacherous Liandrin Guirale. Nynaeve and fellow novice Elayne Trakand escape capture by the Seanchan, and eventually manage to rescue a captive Egwene. One of the most powerful channelers of her time, Nynaeve's skill with healing leads her to join the Yellow Ajah of the Aes Sedai. She eventually discovers methods for healing those who have been severed from the One Power. She marries the Warder Lan Mandragoran, King of Malkier.

Nynaeve is portrayed by Zoë Robins in the Wheel of Time television series adaptation.

=== Moiraine Damodred ===
In The Eye of the World, the arrival of Moiraine Damodred, an Aes Sedai of the Blue Ajah, to the remote village of Emond's Field precedes an attack by Trollocs. Moiraine warns that the servants of the Dark One are, as she is, seeking one of three young men from the village: Rand al'Thor, Perrin Aybara and Mat Cauthon. She and her companion, the Warder Lan Mandragoran, lead the trio and some others away to safety, but face danger along the way to the Aes Sedai's White Tower in Tar Valon.

Moiraine is portrayed by Rosamund Pike in the Wheel of Time television series adaptation.

=== Lan Mandragoran ===
al'Lan "Lan" Mandragoran is the Warder to Moiraine Damodred in The Eye of the World. They lead a trio of young men, one of whom Moiraine suspects is the prophesied Dragon Reborn, away from their small village with a horde of Trollocs, serving the Dark One, in pursuit. The greatest swordsman of the Third Age, Lan is also the King of Malkier by birth, though that country was lost to the Shadow when he was a child.

Lan is portrayed by Daniel Henney in the Wheel of Time television series adaptation.

=== Elayne Trakand ===
Elayne Trakand is the daughter and heir of Morgase Trakand, Queen of Andor, and Taringail Damodred. She is the sister of Gawyn Trakand, and the half-sister of Galad Damodred through his father. In The Eye of the World, Elayne meets Rand al'Thor in Caemlyn, the capital of Andor, when he falls off a wall into the palace garden. Elayne becomes a novice of the Aes Sedai in The Great Hunt, befriending Egwene al'Vere and Nynaeve al'Meara. They travel to Falme believing Rand needs their help, but it is a trap that ends with Egwene's capture and enslavement by the Seanchan High Lady Suroth. Elayne and Nynaeve manage to rescue her, with the help of Min Farshaw. A powerful channeler, Elayne becomes an Aes Sedai of the Green Ajah, and rediscovers the lost talent of creating ter'angreal, artifacts which amplify the One Power in specific ways.

Elayne is portrayed by Ceara Coveney in the Wheel of Time television series adaptation, first appearing in the 2023 episode "Strangers and Friends".

=== Min Farshaw ===
Elmindreda "Min" Farshaw is a clairvoyant whom Rand meets in The Eye of the World. She has the unusual ability to see visions and auras around people that predict future events in some way, though they are often subject to interpretation. Aware of Min's talents, which are unconnected to the One Power, Moiraine summons her to the White Tower of the Aes Sedai in The Great Hunt, where she meets Egwene al'Vere, Nynaeve al'Meara and Elayne Trakand.

Min is portrayed by Kae Alexander in the Wheel of Time television series adaptation, first appearing in the 2021 episode "The Dark Along the Ways".

=== Aviendha ===
Aviendha is an Aiel Maiden of the Spear who first appears in The Dragon Reborn. She and her party meet Egwene al'Vere, Elayne Trakand and Nynaeve al'Meara on their way to the Stone of Tear to find Rand al'Thor. Later in the series she bonded Rand as her Warder after she, Elayne, and Min agreed to love Rand together and respect one another. In the last battle she defeats Hessalam (formerly known as Graendal) and is one of only four people, who are fully aware, that Rand al'Thor did not die during the last battle.

Aviendha is portrayed by Ayoola Smart in the Wheel of Time television adaptation, first appearing in the 2023 episode "Damane". In the series, Perrin Aybara frees her from a cage she has been placed in by the Whitecloaks, but she proves herself more than capable of defending herself when she singlehandedly defeats a group of them unarmed.

=== Thom Merrilin ===
Thomdril "Thom" Merrilin is a traveling gleeman and adventurer, and former bard to Queen Morgase of Andor. In The Eye of the World, he is in the remote village of Emond's Field when it is attacked by a horde of Trollocs. He joins a group of young villagers who flee under the guidance of the Aes Sedai Moiraine Damodred and her Warder, Lan Mandragoran. Thom is presumed killed when he helps Rand al'Thor and Mat Cauthon escape by fighting a Fade, or Myrddraal, the deadly, eyeless creatures who lead the pursuing Trollocs. Thom is proven to be alive after all when he is reunited with Rand in The Great Hunt, and he helps Mat foil a plot to assassinate Elayne Trakand in The Dragon Reborn.

Thom is portrayed by Alexandre Willaume in the Wheel of Time television series adaptation, first appearing in the 2021 episode "A Place of Safety".

== Supporting ==
=== Logain Ablar ===
Logain Ablar is a powerful male channeler who believes himself to be the Dragon Reborn, but is deemed a False Dragon by the Aes Sedai and gentled (cut off from the One Power). He is later healed by Nynaeve al'Meara, and becomes a sworn ally to Rand al'Thor.

Logain is portrayed by Álvaro Morte in seasons one and two of the Wheel of Time television adaptation, first appearing in the 2021 episode "A Place of Safety".

=== Aginor ===
Aginor is one of the most devious Forsaken, powerful channelers who became servants of the Dark One during the Second Age, or the Age of Legends. He created the Dark One's army of Shadowspawn, including Myrddraal, Trollocs, Draghkar and gholam. Originally an amoral biologist, Aginor joined the Shadow so he could continue his forbidden genetic experiments. The Forsaken are ultimately imprisoned with the Dark One for millennia. Three thousand years later near the end of the Third Age, Aginor and the Forsaken Balthamel confront Rand and his companions in The Eye of the World. They have escaped their imprisonment, but the ordeal has left Aginor horribly disfigured, appearing impossibly ancient. He attempts to destroy Rand, but draws too much of the One Power and incinerates himself. Aginor is reincarnated as Osan'gar by the Dark One in Lord of Chaos.

=== Asmodean ===
Asmodean is a Forsaken, originally a composer and musician who joined the Shadow to achieve immortality and thereby gain the fame and recognition which previously eluded him. As one of the Forsaken, he actively punished his former musical rivals by maiming and rendering them unable to practice their art. In The Shadow Rising, Asmodean is enlisted by the Forsaken Lanfear to train Rand al'Thor in the use of the One Power, if she can convince Rand to accept. Asmodean pursues his own agenda, attempting to gain control of one of two powerful sa'angreal called the Choedan Kal. Warned by Lanfear, Rand thwarts his plan, and manages to sever Asmodean's connection with the Dark One. Asmodean, shielded by Lanfear from using his full power, commits to training Rand. He accompanies Rand on his travels and trains him diligently in The Fires of Heaven, but is killed by an unknown assailant just as he has resigned himself to siding with Rand against the Dark One.

=== Balthamel ===
Balthamel is a former historian who became one of the Forsaken for the promise of immortality. He ran an extensive spy network for the Dark One, and oversaw camps where humans were used to feed the carnivorous Trollocs. Balthamel and the Forsaken Aginor confront Rand and his companions in The Eye of the World. They have escaped their imprisonment, but the ordeal has left Balthamel horribly disfigured, with rotting skin and no longer able to speak. He burns Someshta, the Green Man, nearly to death, but Someshta uses the last of his life force to consume Balthamel with fungi and invasive plant life. Balthamel is reincarnated as Aran'gar, in a female body, by the Dark One in Lord of Chaos.

=== Faile Bashere ===
Zarine "Faile" Bashere is the daughter of Davram Bashere, one of the five "Great Captains", and a princess in line for the throne of Saldea. Introduced in The Dragon Reborn, she is on the hunt for the Horn of Valere when she meets Perrin Aybara on his long journey to Tear, and joins him in his quest. She becomes a key part of the core group that travels with Perrin, like Loial and Gaul, in the novels. Faile and Perrin fall in love, and marry in The Shadow Rising. Screen Rant calls Faile "a key figure in the books' political landscape."

Faile is portrayed by Isabella Bucceri in season three of the Wheel of Time television adaptation, first appearing in the 2025 episode "Seeds of Shadow".

=== Be'lal ===
Be'lal is one of the Forsaken, formerly a lawyer and close friend of Lews Therin Telamon who with him rediscovered the art of swordplay in battle. In The Dragon Reborn, Be'lal has escaped imprisonment and taken the identity High Lord Samon of Tear. He lures Rand al'Thor to the Stone of Tear, knowing that as the Dragon Reborn only Rand can retrieve the powerful sword Callandor. Rand claims it, and Be'lal battles him with his superior swordsmanship to take Callandor for himself. Moirane Damodred intervenes, destroying Be'lal with balefire.

=== Dain Bornhald ===
Dain Bornhald is a high-ranking officer of the Children of the Light, and the son of Geofram Bornhald. His father is killed by the Seanchan while fighting alongside Perrin Aybara against them, but Dain comes to believe that Perrin is responsible, and seeks revenge. He leads a legion of Whitecloaks to occupy the Two Rivers, purportedly to root out Darkfriends. Perrin and his friends arrive to drive them out, but the two forces are forced to work together against a Trolloc invasion.

Dain is portrayed by Jay Duffy in seasons two and three of the Wheel of Time television adaptation, first appearing in the 2023 episode "Damane". In the series, Dain witnesses Perrin kill his father during the Battle of Falme, and swears vengeance.

=== Anvaere Damodred ===
Anvaere Damodred is a noblewoman in Cairhien and the sister of Moiraine Damodred. She is mentioned briefly in the prequel novel New Spring (2004).

An expanded version of the character is portrayed by Lindsay Duncan in season two the Wheel of Time television adaptation, first appearing in the 2023 episode "What Might Be". Rand al'Thor and Selene infiltrate a society party, where Anvaere gives them inside information about other guests, and the queen of Cairhien herself. Moiraine appears on Anvaere's doorstep in "Daughter of the Night", after being away for many years, but is more focused on her need to find Rand in the city than with reconnecting with her sister. Though Moiraine is the elder sibling, thanks to the One Power she appears much younger than Anvaere, who is quick to remind Moiraine that she has weathered much adversity since last they met. And as the local spymaster, Anvaere is able to lead Moiraine to Rand in time for her to help him escape the Forsaken Lanfear. Moiraine and Rand take refuge with Anvaere and her son Barthanes Damodred in "Damane". A frank conversation with Anvaere prompts Moiraine to change plans and allow Rand to confront Lanfear, rather than keep running. In "Eyes Without Pity", Anvaere lashes out at Moiraine when she rebuffs Barthanes's earnest efforts to reconnect with his aunt. Later, Moiraine gives encouragement to Barthanes, who will soon be king thanks to his engagement to the queen of Cairhien. In "Daes Dae'mar", Anvaere eavesdrops on a private conversation between Barthanes and the Aes Sedai Liandrin Guirale, revealing they are secretly Darkfriends. Their master, the Forsaken Ishamael, wishes Barthanes to murder the troublesome Moiraine, and Anvaere herself if necessary to keep their secret. Barthanes acts on his instructions to kill Moiraine, but is deceived and finds himself locked in a cell by his disgusted mother. Though he protests that his allegiance to the Dark One has made their fortune, Anvaere has already reported his crime to the authorities and sealed his fate.

=== Barthanes Damodred ===
Barthanes Damodred is the High Seat of House Damodred and cousin to the former king of Carhien. In The Great Hunt, he invites Rand al'Thor to a party to gauge Rand's loyalties. Barthanes is secretly a Darkfriend, and passes a message from the duplicitous Padan Fain luring Rand to Falme. Barthanes is subsequently murdered by an agent of the Dark One.

A version of the character is portrayed by Will Tudor in season two of the Wheel of Time television adaptation, first appearing in the 2023 episode "Damane". In the series, Barthanes is the nephew of Moiraine Damodred, the son of her sister Anvaere, and is engaged to be married to Galldrain, the queen of Cairhien. A visiting Moiraine, long absent from the family and distracted by her Aes Sedai business, initially rebuffs Barthanes's efforts to reconnect in "Eyes Without Pity", but later has kind words for him. In "Daes Dae'mar", Barthanes meets with the Aes Sedai Liandrin Guirale, revealing they are secretly Darkfriends. Their master Ishamael wants Barthanes to kill the troublesome Moiraine, and his mother if necessary to keep the secret, but they are overheard by Anvaere. Barthanes acts on his instructions to kill Moiraine, but is deceived and finds himself locked in a cell by his disgusted mother. Though he protests that his allegiance to the Dark One has made their fortune, Anvaere has already reported his crime to the authorities and sealed his fate.

=== Galad Damodred ===
Galadedrid "Galad" Damodred is the half-brother of Elayne and Gawyn Trakand through his father, Taringail Damodred, and the half-brother of Rand al'Thor through his mother, Tigraine Mantear. In The Eye of the World, Galad and his siblings travel to Tar Valon, where he and Gawyn train as Warders while Elayne becomes one of the Aes Sedai. By The Fires of Heaven, Galad has joined the Children of the Light, also known as the Whitecloaks, and rises quickly in their ranks. In Knife of Dreams, he learns from Dain Bornhald that Eamon Valda, Lord Captain Commander of the Children of the Light, has raped and presumably murdered Galad's stepmother, Queen Morgase Trakand of Andor. Galad challenges Eamon to "Trial Under the Light", a trial by combat duel to the death. Galad defeats Eamon, and becomes Lord Captain Commander. His belief that the Whitecloaks should join forces with the Aes Sedai, whom the Children of the Light believe serve the Dark One, creates a schism in the order. Galad is opposed and betrayed by Rhadam Asunawa, High Inquisitor and leader of the Hand of the Light, a faction within the Children of the Light who use brutal interrogation methods to get confessions from suspected Darkfriends. Rhadam's fanaticism ultimately proves too much even for his followers, and he is executed as the Whitecloaks swear fealty to Galad.

The character, called Galad Trakand, is portrayed by Callum Kerr in season three of the Wheel of Time television series adaptation, first appearing in the 2025 episode "A Question of Crimson".

=== Dark One ===
The Dark One is a malevolent entity who, though imprisoned for millennia since the Wheel of Time was forged, plots to destroy it and remake the universe in his image. He employs a network of minions, most seduced by promises of power and immortality, to serve him toward this goal. The most notable of these are the Forsaken, powerful channelers imprisoned with him in the Second Age who begin to escape and reenter the world at the end of the Third Age.

In the Wheel of Time television adaptation, the Dark One is depicted as a charred figure with flames in his mouth and eyes in the season one episode "Shadow's Waiting". He seemingly appears to Rand al'Thor, Mat Cauthon, Perrin Aybara and Egwene al'Vere in their dreams, proving that despite being imprisoned he is able to reach out into the world. In the books, however, the charred figure from the characters' dreams is later revealed to be the Forsaken Ishamael.

=== Demandred ===
Demandred is one of the most powerful of the Forsaken, having turned to the Shadow due to his jealousy of Lews Therin Telamon's superiority. He served as the Dark One's top military general during Age of Legends. In the series, Demandred and his scheming are spoken of repeatedly, though the character appears only briefly until the final novel, A Memory of Light. He leads the forces of the Shadow in the Last Battle. The Aes Sedai Warder Lan Mandragoran attacks Demandred, killing him in single combat by letting Demandred stab him, then decapitating the Forsaken while his blade is thus engaged.

=== Padan Fain ===
Padan Fain is a traveling merchant who comes to the remote village of Emond's Field in The Eye of the World, just as it is attacked by a horde of fearsome Trollocs. Several local residents, whom the Trollocs were seeking, flee with the Aes Sedai Moiraine Damodred. Fain is a Darkfriend, a servant of the Dark One given otherworldly powers by the Forsaken Ba'alzamon so he may track Rand al'Thor, Mat Cauthon and Perrin Aybara, one of whom is believed to be the prophesied Dragon Reborn. The Dark One who seeks to seduce the Dragon to the Shadow, or destroy him. Having led the Trollocs to the village but failing in his mission, Fain is forced to join in the continuing pursuit by the Fades, or Myrddraal, the deadly, eyeless creatures who command the Trollocs.

Fain sees a chance to escape the Myrddraal when Rand's group evades capture by entering the cursed city of Shadar Logoth, where the Fades and Trollocs will not go. Once known as Aridhol, the city has been overtaken by a malevolent entity known as Mashadar. The spirit Mordeth, the former councilor of Aridhol who is now the avatar of Mashadar, lures Rand, Mat and Perrin to a cursed trove of treasure, from which Mat secretly takes a dagger. They leave the city, and the dagger begins to corrupt Mat's mind and body. Before Fain can follow, Mordeth recognizes in him a way to escape the city himself. But since the Dark One has touched and changed Fain's soul, Mordeth can only merge with Fain, not overtake him completely. Fain escapes Aes Sedai captivity in The Great Hunt, stealing both Mat's dagger and the powerful Horn of Valere in the process.

Fain is portrayed by Johann Myers in the Wheel of Time television series adaptation.

=== Graendal ===
Graendal is one of the Forsaken, a former psychologist obsessed with beauty and control. She is notable for her mastery of Compulsion, the use of the One Power to control other's minds. In the series, her plots with Sammael, Demandred and Aran'gar come to nothing, and she is punished with death for her failure to kill Perrin Aybara after being given the tools to do so by Moridin.

=== Liandrin Guirale ===
Liandrin Guirale is an Aes Sedai of the Red Ajah. In The Great Hunt, she lures Aes Sedai novices Egwene al'Vere, Nynaeve al'Meara and Elayne Trakand to Falme by telling them their friend Rand al'Thor is in trouble. Once there, they are betrayed by Liandrin, secretly a Darkfriend and member of the Black Ajah, and handed over to the Seanchan High Lady Suroth to be enslaved.

Liandrin is portrayed by Kate Fleetwood in the Wheel of Time television series adaptation, first appearing in the 2021 episode "A Place of Safety". She is depicted as harsh and dedicated to the Red Ajah goal of gentling all male channelers, but also a potentially helpful mentor to Nynaeve. She lures Nynaeve, Egwene and Elayne out of the White Tower in "Daughter of the Night", and takes them captive. In "Damane", she hands them over to Suroth to be enslaved.

Collider described Liandrin as "one of those characters that fans love to hate."

=== Ihvon ===
Ihvon is one of the two Warders who serve Alanna Mosvani, an Aes Sedai of the Green Ajah. He saves Perrin Aybara from a Myrddraal in The Shadow Rising.

Ihvon is portrayed by Emmanuel Imani in seasons one and two, and by Anthony Kaye in season three, in the Wheel of Time television series adaptation, first appearing in the 2021 episode "The Dragon Reborn". In the series, Ihvon, Alanna and her second Warder, Maksim, are depicted to be in a polyamorous relationship. Ihvon is killed by Liandrin when the Black Ajah flee the White Tower in "To Race the Shadow".

=== Ishamael ===
Ishamael is the most powerful of the Forsaken, and the only man known to be equal in power to Lews Therin Telamon and his reincarnation, Rand al'Thor. Originally named Elan Morin Tedronai, he joined the Shadow because he determined it was inevitable the Dark One would eventually triumph. He was bound to the Dark One's prison but, unlike the other Forsaken, remained able to walk the world periodically. When Lews is driven mad and murders his own family, Ishamael visits him and heals his mind so he will realize what he has done. He is frustrated when Lews commits suicide, cheating Ishamael of the opportunity to punish him further. Over the millennia, Ishamael emerged to manipulate human events and stoke conflicts, laying the groundwork for the Dark One's rise. Using the name Ba'alzamon, Ishamael invades the dreams of Rand, Perrin Aybara and Mat Cauthon in The Eye of the World. Rand is finally confronted by Ba'alzamon, who he believes is the Dark One himself, and successfully rebuffs him by channeling the One Power for the first time. In The Great Hunt, Ishamael as Ba'alzamon presides over a clandestine meeting which includes Forsaken, various Darkfriends and two Aes Sedai. Rand battles Ba'alzamon at Falme, wounding the Forsaken grieviously by allowing himself to be stabbed first. Ba'alzamon attacks Rand again in The Dragon Reborn, but Rand kills him using the powerful crystal sword Callandor. Ishamael is later reincarnated by the Dark One as Moridin.

Ishamael is portrayed by Fares Fares in the Wheel of Time television adaptation, first appearing in the 2021 episode "The Eye of the World", in which Rand and Moiraine Damodred mistake him for the Dark One. Rand appears to neutralize him, but only after Ishamael cuts Moiraine off from the One Power. In season two, Ishamael masterminds the plot to seduce Rand to the Shadow or destroy him. In "Daughter of the Night", he is revealed to have previously released the dangerous Forsaken Lanfear, who has already sought out Rand, the reincarnation of her ancient lover Lews. He employs the Aes Sedai Liandrin Guirale as his agent, and coerces Min Farshaw to lead Mat to Falme, where he is destined to kill Rand. Ishamael has also placed himself as a powerful advisor to the invading Seanchan, ingratiating himself to High Lord Turak, and outright controlling High Lady Suroth, who knows his true nature and fears him. In "What Was Meant to Be", Ishamael asks Rand to join him and the Shadow, or be killed. Rand refuses, and Ishamael uses illusion to deceive Mat into stabbing Rand with a cursed dagger. With help from his friends, Rand is able to rise up and slay Ishamael using a sword infused with the One Power.

Sean T. Collins of Vulture described the character as "Handsome, worldly, sophisticated ... and he's one of the most innovative big bads I've seen on genre television since the psychotically chipper Lalo Salamanca on Better Call Saul.

=== Lanfear ===
Lanfear is one of the most powerful of the Forsaken, and the most powerful female channeler among them. Originally known as Mierin Eronaile, she was in a romantic relationship with the Dragon, Lews Therin Telamon, but was eventually spurned by him for her unbridled ambition. She was imprisoned with the Dark One and the other Forsaken, but eventually escapes at the end of the Third Age and seeks out Rand al'Thor, the reincarnation of Lews.

Introduced in The Great Hunt as the mysterious Selene, she stages her rescue by Rand al'Thor, the reincarnation of Lews, from an attack by strange beasts called grolm in a distorted, alternate world. She then leads Rand and his party back to a Portal Stone that he uses to return to the real world. Lanfear is all powerful in Tel'aran'rhiod, the World of Dreams, and visits Rand and Mat Cauthon there as Selene in The Dragon Reborn. She is surprised to see Perrin Aybara in the dream realm, but as a wolfbrother he has power there as well, and eventually recognizes her as Lanfear. She impersonates Else Grinwell and appears to Egwene al'Vere, Nynaeve al'Meara and Elayne Trakand to manipulate their investigation into the Black Ajah. Lanfear appears to Rand as Selene in The Shadow Rising, and reveals her identity as one of the Forsaken.

Lanfear is portrayed by Natasha O'Keeffe in seasons two and three of the Wheel of Time television series adaptation, first appearing in the 2023 episode "Strangers and Friends". Initially posing as innkeeper Selene, Lanfear begins a romantic relationship with Rand, hoping to bind his loyalty and seduce him to the Shadow.

=== Loial ===
Loial is an Ogier who meets Rand al'Thor in Tar Valon in The Eye of the World, and becomes one of his most loyal and trusted friends. The Ogier are a hirsute, wide-featured and immensely tall and strong species of humanoid known for their proficiency in woodwork and masonry. Though physically intimidating, they are peaceful, intelligent and interested in historical and genealogical study. The Ogier also possess a unique ability called treesinging, whereby they stimulate the growth and healing of trees and plants by singing to them.

Loial is portrayed by Hammed Animashaun in the Wheel of Time television series adaptation, first appearing in the 2021 episode "Blood Calls Blood".

=== Elyas Machera ===
Elyas Machera is a tracker and wolfbrother, a man able to communicate telepathically with wolves. In The Eye of the World, he meets Perrin Aybara and Egwene al'Vere as they flee the cursed city of Shadar Logoth, and reveals to Perrin that he is also a wolfbrother. He later joins up with Perrin's army in Ghealdan, and serves as one of Perrin's closest advisors.

Elyas is portrayed by Gary Beadle in season two of the Wheel of Time television series adaptation, first appearing in the 2023 episode "A Taste of Solitude".

=== Maksim ===
Maksim is one of two Warders who serve Alanna Mosvani, an Aes Sedai of the Green Ajah, in the Wheel of Time television series adaptation. The character is a renamed version of Owein, Alanna's second Warder who is killed by Whitecloaks in The Shadow Rising.

Maksim is portrayed by Taylor Napier in the Wheel of Time television series adaptation, first appearing in the 2021 episode "The Dragon Reborn". In the series, Maksim, Alanna and her second Warder, Ihvon, are depicted to be in a polyamorous relationship.

=== Verin Mathwin ===
Verin Mathwin is an Aes Sedai of the Brown Ajah, introduced in The Great Hunt as part of the Amyrlin Seat Siuan Sanche's escort to Fal Dara.

Verin is portrayed by Meera Syal in seasons two and three of the Wheel of Time television series adaptation, first appearing in the 2023 episode "A Taste of Solitude".

=== Mesaana ===
Mesaana is one of the Forsaken, known for her widespread attempts to indoctrinate children into serving the Dark One. In the Third Age, she infiltrates the Aes Sedai White Tower, manipulating internal conflicts and monitoring the Amyrlin Seat Elaida a'Roihan. Mesaana also controls Alviarin Freidhen of the White Ajah, who serves the Amyrlin as Keeper of the Chronicles and secretly leads the Black Ajah Supreme Council within the White Tower. In Towers of Midnight, Egwene al'Vere lures Mesaana out of hiding and into Tel'aran'rhiod, where Egwene is able to break Mesaana's mind.

=== Moghedien ===
Moghedien is one of the Forsaken, known as a master schemer. She secretly joined the Shadow and operated an extensive spy network for the Dark One from within Lews Therin Telamon's own ranks. Originally named Lillen Moiral, she took the name Moghedien from a reclusive but deadly spider from the Second Age. Her mastery of Tel'aran'rhiod, the World of Dreams, rivals Lanfear's. In The Shadow Rising, a disguised Moghedien monitors Liandrin Guirale and the Black Ajah in Tanchico, and then uses Compulsion to subtly interrogate Elayne Trakand and Nynaeve al'Meara, who are investigating the Black Ajah. Moghedien battles Nynaeve and, finding that they are equally matched, slips away. Moghedien punishes Liandrin for insubordination by cutting her off from the One Power in The Fires of Heaven. She has recognized Birgitte Silverbow as the reincarnation of her enemy Teadra from the Age of Legends, and vows to finally get her revenge. Moghedien traps and badly injures Nynaeve and Birgitte in Tel'aran'rhiod, but is injured herself. In a subsequent encounter, Nynaeve subdues an overconfident Moghedien with an a'dam. Nynaeve siphons Moghedien's powers to help Rand al'Thor defeat the Forsaken Rahvin with balefire. Nynaeve and Elayne secretly keep Moghedien as their prisoner in Lord of Chaos. Though they should hand her over to the Aes Sedai for trial and execution, they believe the valuable knowledge they are getting from her about ancient weaves is worth the delay. Aran'gar, the reincarnation of Balthamel, later frees her.

Moghedien is portrayed by Laia Costa in seasons two and three of the Wheel of Time television series adaptation, first appearing in the 2023 episode "What Was Meant to Be". After Ishamael's defeat by Rand al'Thor, Lanfear plans to be rid of the other Forsaken by dropping the Seals they are bound to into the ocean. Lanfear is shocked to come face to face with Moghedien, who reveals that Ishamael has anticipated Lanfear's betrayal, and freed her and the remaining Forsaken. In "To Race the Shadow", Moghedien is shown to possess the unique ability to create soulless Gray Men, drab assassins with the ability to pass completely unnoticed.

=== Alanna Mosvani ===
Alanna Mosvani is an Aes Sedai of the Green Ajah, introduced in The Great Hunt as part of the Amyrlin Seat Siuan Sanche's escort to Fal Dara. She has two Warders, Ihvon and Owein.

Alanna is portrayed by Priyanka Bose in the Wheel of Time television series adaptation, first appearing in the 2021 episode "A Place of Safety". In the series, Alanna, Ihvon and her second Warder Maksim (a renamed version of Owein) are depicted to be in a polyamorous relationship.

=== Kerene Nagashi ===
Kerene Nagashi is an Aes Sedai of the Green Ajah who appears in the prequel novel New Spring, in which she is killed searching for the Dragon Reborn before the events of The Eye of the World.

Kerene is portrayed by Clare Perkins in season one of the Wheel of Time television series adaptation, first appearing in the 2021 episode "A Place of Safety".

=== Tuon Athaem Kore Paendrag ===
Tuon Athaem Kore Paendrag, High Lady Tuon, is Daughter of the Nine Moons and heir to the Seanchan Crystal Throne. In Winter's Heart, she is caught up in Mat Cauthon's escape from the city of Ebou Dar. Mat takes the opportunity to abduct her, as the Aelfinn seers have foretold that he will marry her. He courts her in Crossroads of Twilight, and they marry in Knife of Dreams. Tuon learns of the assassination of her mother, Seanchan Empress Radhanan Paendrag, and returns to Ebou Dar and enslaves the treacherous High Lady Suroth, who plotted Tuon's murder to secure the throne for herself. Tuon declares herself Empress Fortuona of the Seanchan.

=== Rahvin ===
Rahvin is one of the Forsaken, who takes up the alias Lord Gaebril in Andor. In The Dragon Reborn, he has succeeded Elaida a'Roihan as chief advisor to Queen Morgase Trakand. Mat Cauthon overhears him plotting to assassinate Morgase's daughter and heir, Elayne Trakand, and Mat's friends, Egwene al'Vere and Nynaeve al'Meara. Unable to tell Morgase, Mat decides to thwart the attempt himself. In The Fires of Heaven, Rahvin is Morgase's consort, and uses Compulsion to manipulate her and rule Andor through her. Kept in a confused and oblivious state by Rahvin, Morgase eventually learns that he has alienated her allies and surrounded himself with people loyal to him, and she escapes Caemlyn. She is later rumored to be dead, prompting Rand al'Thor to seek revenge. Rahvin lures Rand and his friends into a trap, and kills Mat, the Aiel Maiden of the Spear Aviendha and the Forsaken Asmodean with lightning. An enraged Rand confronts Rahvin directly. They are evenly matched, and their battle takes them into the World of Dreams. Having subdued the Forsaken Moghedien with an a'dam, Nynaeve siphons Moghedien's powers to attack Rahvin, giving Rand a chance to destroy Rahvin with balefire. The deaths of Mat, Aviendha and Asmodean are subsequently undone.

Lord Gaebril is portrayed by Nuno Lopes in season three of the Wheel of Time television series adaptation, first appearing in the 2025 episode "A Question of Crimson". Gaebril is the consort of Queen Morgase of Andor. He is revealed to be Rahvin, a Forsaken with a mastery of Compulsion, in "Seeds of Shadow".

=== Elaida a'Roihan ===
Elaida do Avriny a'Roihan is an Aes Sedai of the Red Ajah. In The Eye of the World, she is the advisor to Queen Morgase Trakand of Andor. Elaida later manages to depose and still Siuan Sanche, the Amyrlin Seat, and take her place as leader of the White Tower. Elaida's rule is troubled, as a schism forms among the Aes Sedai. She is also unknowingly being manipulated by Alviarin Freidhen of the White Ajah, who secretly leads the Black Ajah Supreme Council within the White Tower. She is ultimately captured by the Seanchan, and enslaved as a damane.

Elaida is portrayed by Shohreh Aghdashloo in season three of the Wheel of Time television series adaptation, first appearing in the 2025 episode "A Question of Crimson".

=== Sammael ===
Sammael is one of the Forsaken, a top military general in the Age of Legends who turned to the Shadow out of bitterness after Lews Therin Telamon was given supreme command of the forces of the Light. In The Dragon Reborn, Rand and his allies learn that Sammael rules Illian as Lord Brend. In The Shadow Rising, Sammael sends a force of Fades and Trollocs to attack Rand at the Stone of Tear, but the Forsaken Semirhage sends her own Shadowspawn to oppose Sammael's. Rand uses the crystal sword Callandor to destroy both forces with lightning. In A Crown of Swords, Rand battles Sammael in the cursed city of Shadar Logoth, where the Forsaken is destroyed by the malevolent entity Mashadar.

Sammael is portrayed by Cameron Jack in season three of the Wheel of Time television series adaptation, first appearing in the 2025 episode "Seeds of Shadow".

=== Siuan Sanche ===
Siuan Sanche is the Amyrlin Seat, the leader of the Aes Sedai, and formerly a member of the Blue Ajah. She is deposed and stilled, but later healed by Nynaeve al'Meara. Siuan becomes an advisor and mentor to Egwene al'Vere when she rises to the Amyrlin Seat.

Siuan is portrayed by Sophie Okonedo in the Wheel of Time television series adaptation, first appearing in the 2021 episode "The Flame of Tar Valon".

=== Semirhage ===
Semirhage is one of the Forsaken, a celebrated healer during the Age of Legends who also enjoyed inflicting sadistic torture. Given the choice of stopping this behavior or being severed from the One Power, she chose instead to join the Shadow. In the series, Rand al'Thor loses a hand to a fireball from Semirhage, who at one point manages to subdue him with a male a'dam. Rand eventually kills her with balefire.

=== Leane Sharif ===
Leane Sharif is an Aes Sedai of the Blue Ajah, and later the Green Ajah, who serves as Keeper of the Chronicles under the Amyrlin Seat Siuan Sanche. She is deposed and stilled, but later healed by Nynaeve al'Meara.

Leane is portrayed by Jennifer Cheon Garcia in the Wheel of Time television series adaptation, first appearing in the 2021 episode "The Flame of Tar Valon".

=== High Lady Suroth ===
Suroth Sabelle Meldarath, High Lady Suroth, is a Seanchan noblewoman and Darkfriend to whom Liandrin Guirale delivers the Aes Sedai novices Elayne Trakand, Egwene al'Vere, and Nynaeve al'Meara to be collared and trained as damane in The Great Hunt. After the assassination of Seanchan Empress Radhanan Paendrag, Suroth plots the murder of her daughter, Tuon Athaem Kore Paendrag, to secure the throne for herself in Knife of Dreams. Tuon escapes death and instead enslaves the treacherous Suroth before declaring herself Empress Fortuona of the Seanchan.

High Lady Suroth is portrayed by Karima McAdams in season two of the Wheel of Time television series adaptation, first appearing in the 2023 episode "Strangers and Friends".

=== Lews Therin Telamon ===
In the backstory of the series, Lews Therin Telamon is a hero of the Age of Legends known as the Dragon, the most powerful channeler of his time. As the leader of the Aes Sedai, which at that time was made up of both men and women, Lews conceived a risky plan to reseal the prison of the Dark One, whose influence had begun to seep out into the world. Lews and a host of 99 male channelers were successful, but at the moment of victory, the Dark One was able to taint saidin, the male half of the One Power, driving male channelers insane. Lews killed his friends and family, and then himself. Other male channelers devastated the world with earthquakes and tidal waves, an event called the Breaking of the World, before destroying themselves. The female Aes Sedai guided humanity out of this dark time, living in the shadow of a prophecy that the Dark One would break free from his prison and the Dragon would be reborn to fight him once more.

Three thousand years later in The Eye of the World, the Aes Sedai learn that the Dragon has been reborn, and investigate various candidates. But the Forsaken, the newly-freed servants of the Dark One, are also looking for the Dragon Reborn. He is revealed to be Rand al'Thor, and the Aes Sedai and the Forsaken each scheme to enlist him to their side of the coming conflict with the Dark One.

Telamon is portrayed by Alexander Karim in the Wheel of Time television adaptation, appearing via flashback in the season one finale "The Eye of the World" (2021), and the season two finale "What Was Meant to Be" (2023).

=== Gawyn Trakand ===
Gawyn Trakand is the son of Morgase Trakand, Queen of Andor, and Taringail Damodred. He is the brother of Elayne Trakand, and the half-brother of Galad Damodred through his father. Gawyn becomes the Warder of Egwene al'Vere.

Gawyn is portrayed by Luke Fetherston in season three of the Wheel of Time television series adaptation, first appearing in the 2025 episode "A Question of Crimson".

=== Morgase Trakand ===
Morgase Trakand is the Queen of Andor, and the mother of Elayne and Gawyn Trakand by Taringail Damodred. She is introduced in The Eye of the World, and in The Great Hunt is furious to find that her daughter and heir Elayne Trakand has disappeared from the Aes Sedai school at Tar Valon. In The Dragon Reborn, Lord Gaebril—secretly the Forsaken Rahvin in disguise—has succeeded Elaida a'Roihan as Morgase's chief advisor, and plots to assassinate Elayne. In The Fires of Heaven Rahvin is Morgase's consort and uses Compulsion to manipulate her and rule Andor through her. Kept in a confused and oblivious state by Rahvin, Morgase eventually learns that he has alienated her allies and surrounded himself with people loyal to him, and she escapes Caemlyn. She is later rumored to be dead. After a series of subsequent captures and escapes, Morgase is reunited with her step-son Galad Damodred, and then with Elayne.

Morgase is portrayed by Olivia Williams in season three of the Wheel of Time television series adaptation, appearing in the 2025 episode "A Question of Crimson".

=== High Lord Turak ===
Turak Aladon, High Lord Turak, is a Seanchan nobleman and royal commander of the Hailene, the Seanchan force sent to the Westlands to explore and ultimately conquer it. He is defeated in personal combat by Rand al'Thor as the Seanchan forces invade Falme.

Turak is portrayed by Daniel Francis in season two the Wheel of Time television adaptation, first appearing in the 2023 episode "Damane".

=== Eamon Valda ===
Eamon Valda is the Lord Captain Commander of the Children of the Light, and a blademaster. He schemes to have his predecessor, Pedron Niall, assassinated so that he may ascend to Lord Captain Commander. Valda next forces Queen Morgase of Andor to submit to his authority in writing, and then rapes her. Learning of these acts, Galad Damodred, Valda's subordinate and Morgase's adopted son, challenges Valda to a Trial Under the Light, an ancient and sacred form of trial by combat. After a brutal duel, Galad is victorious, killing Valda and succeeding him as Lord Captain Commander.

Valda is portrayed by Abdul Salis in the Wheel of Time television adaptation, first appearing in the 2021 episode "Shadow's Waiting". He is "as sadistic as he is zealous", and enjoys torturing Aes Sedai as he pursues his goal to exterminate all of them. Possessing a hatred for Perrin Aybara, Valda interrogates Mat Cauthon's mother, Natti, for information on Perrin's whereabouts, torturing and killing her when he believes she can channel. Mat's younger sisters, Bode and Eldrin, are the real channelers, and subsequently burn Valda alive with the One Power.

== Other ==
Logain's personal flag

Guaire Amalasan's personal flag

Flag of House Arawn

The Red Eagle of Manetheren, a banner carried by Perrin's forces

The Red Wolfhead Banner, another banner carried by Perrin's forces

Flag of House Bashere

Flag of the Band of the Red Hand, of which Mat is the leader

Flag of the Children of the Light, of whom Galad is the leader

Talmanes' con

Agelmar's personal flag

Flag used by the Panarch of Tarabon, Amathera's former position

The Golden Crane of Malkier, flown by Lan's force

Flag of House Mantear

Flag of House Marne

Flag of House Mitsobar

The Dragon Banner, one of the banners carried by Rand's forces.

The Banner of Light, another banner carried by Rand's forces.

Flag of House Saighan

Flag of House Sarand

Ingtar's personal flag

Mattin Stepaneos' personal flag

Dobraine's con

Flag of House Trakand

Elayne's personal flag

Gawyn's personal flag

Flag of the Younglings, of whom Gawyn is the leader

The Traitor's Banner, which is flown by Saldaeans who feel they have betrayed their oaths, including Yoeli

=== A ===
- Jonan Adley: Early recruit of the Black Tower killed when Rand al'Thor loses control of Callandor in Altara.
- Dermid Ajala: Blacksmith of Tear.
- Lelaine Akashi: Aes Sedai, Sitter, and First Selector of the Blue Ajah.
- Nalesean Aldiaya: Deceased commander of the Band of the Red Hand.
- Alivia: Former Seanchan damane, and the most powerful female channeler alive.
- Katerine Alruddin: Black Ajah sister formerly of the Red Ajah. She is killed in Tel'aran'rhiod by Egwene al'Vere.
- Doesine Alwain: Aes Sedai of the Yellow Ajah. She is part of the group of Aes Sedai using the Oath Rod to reveal sisters of the Black Ajah in the White Tower. Doesine is killed in the Last Battle.
- Guaire Amalasan: A previous False Dragon who conquered nearly half of the Westlands in the War of the Second Dragon. He was defeated by Artur Hawkwing, and gentled by the White Tower.
- Merana Ambrey: Aes Sedai of the Grey Ajah.
- Amys: Aiel Wise One. One of Aviendha's and Egwene's primary mentors.
- Setalle Anan: Former Aes Sedai of the Brown Ajah who becomes an innkeeper in Ebou Dar.
- Sashalle Anderly: Aes Sedai of the Red Ajah, stilled by Rand and healed by Damer Flinn.
- Estean Andiama: Lieutenant-General in the Band of the Red Hand, he commands the cavalry of the Murandy contingent, particularly three banners of horse.
- Rianna Andomeran: Black Ajah sister formerly of the White Ajah, held prisoner in a stedding.
- Anlee: Aes Sedai and former Sitter of the Blue Ajah.
- Aram: A young Tuatha'an (tinker) who joins with Perrin after renouncing the pacifistic Way of the Leaf, having seen other tinkers killed by Trollocs. He is later manipulated by Masema Dagar into believing Perrin is one of the Shadowspawn. Aram is portrayed by Daryl McCormack in seasons one and three of the Wheel of Time television adaptation.
- Naean Arawn: Andoran noblewoman who attempts to claim the Lion Throne after Morgase's disappearance, but is arrested and imprisoned by Dyelin. She is later freed by Arymilla and forced to support her claim to the throne. Naean is taken prisoner by Elayne Trakand after Arymilla's attack on Caemlyn is foiled, and is stripped of all lands and titles. Elayne later offers Naean new lands in Cairhien.
- Lyrelle Arienwin: Aes Sedai and Sitter of the Blue Ajah.
- Saerin Asnobar: Aes Sedai and Sitter of the Brown Ajah. She was part of the group of Aes Sedai using the Oath Rod to reveal sisters of the Black Ajah in the White Tower.
- Rhadam Asunawa: High Inquisitor and leader of the Hand of the Light, a faction within the Children of the Light who use brutal interrogation methods to get confessions from suspected Darkfriends. His fanaticism ultimately proves too much even for the other Children, and he is executed to make way for Galad Damodred to become Lord Captain Commander.
- Edesina Azzedin: Aes Sedai sister of the Yellow Ajah and former damane of the Seanchan.

=== B ===
- Bain: Aiel Maiden of the Spear and First-Sister to Chiad. Bain is portrayed by Ragga Ragnars in seasons two and three of the Wheel of Time television series adaptation.
- Bair: Wise One of the Haido sept of the Shaarad Aiel. She cannot channel, but is an experienced Dreamwalker. Bair is portrayed by Nukâka Coster-Waldau in season three of the Wheel of Time television adaptation, first appearing in the 2025 episode "A Question of Crimson".
- Sebban Balwer: Secretary and spymaster to Perrin Aybara, former spymaster for Pedron Niall of the Children of the Light.
- Teslyn Baradon: Aes Sedai of the Red Ajah who is briefly enslaved as a damane by the Seanchan.
- Narenwin Barda: Aes Sedai of the Yellow Ajah.
- Duhara Basaheen: Black Ajah sister formerly of the Red Ajah, she is eventually killed by Aviendha.
- Davram Bashere: One of the five "Great Captains", born in Saldaea. He commands the Army of the Light in Caemlyn in the Last Battle, in which he dies.
- Adelorna Bastine: Aes Sedai and Captain-General of the Green Ajah.
- Sheriam Bayanar: Black Ajah sister formerly of the Blue Ajah. As the Mistress of Novices, she is charged with managing their progress. She later becomes Egwene's Keeper of the Chronicles, until she is discovered and purged. Sheriam is portrayed by Rima Te Wiata in season two of the Wheel of Time television adaptation.
- Myrelle Berengari: Aes Sedai sister of the Green Ajah and Captain-General for the rebels.
- Falion Bhoda: Black Ajah sister formerly of the White Ajah, she is eventually killed by Aviendha.
- Nesune Bihara: Aes Sedai sister of the Brown Ajah.
- Jesse Bilal: Aes Sedai and First Chair of the Brown Ajah.
- Geofram Bornhald: Lord Captain of the Children of Light and father of Dain Bornhald. He captures Egwene al'Vere and Perrin Aybara, and is ultimately killed by Seanchan at Falme while fighting alongside Perrin. Geofram is portrayed by Stuart Graham in seasons one and two of the Wheel of Time television adaptation.
- Erian Boroleos: Aes Sedai of the Green Ajah.
- Silviana Brehon: Aes Sedai of the Red Ajah. Former Mistress of Novices and Keeper of the Chronicles to Egwene.
- Gareth Bryne: One of the five "Great Captains", originally from Andor. He is the suspected paramour of Queen Morgase, and Warder to Siuan Sanche. He commands the Army of the Light in Kandor in the Last Battle, in which he dies.
- Joiya Byir: Aes Sedai of the Gray Ajah, and secretly a member of the Black Ajah. A skilled political manipulator and negotiator, Joiya is involved in the instruction of novices and Accepted at the White Tower. In The Dragon Reborn, Joiya and twelve other Black Ajah sisters flee the White Tower following the Battle of Falme, stealing a number of ter'angreal. She is captured at the Stone of Tear by Nynaeve al'Meara, Egwene al'Vere, and Elayne Trakand, with help from Mat Cauthon. In The Shadow Rising, Joiya and fellow captive Amico Nagoyin are killed by Slayer during a Trolloc attack on the Stone. Joiya is portrayed by Joelle in seasons two and three of the Wheel of Time television adaptation, first appearing in the 2023 episode "A Taste of Solitude". In the series, Joiya is a Sitter in the Hall of the Tower. She reveals herself as Black Ajah during Liandrin's attack on the White Tower in "To Race the Shadow", but is captured before she can escape. In "Seeds of Shadow", Joiya provides false information during interrogation. In "Tel'aran'rhiod", Elaida tortures Joiya for the names of remaining Black Ajah members, but before she can reveal them, a Gray Man assassin kills her and attacks Elaida, who is saved by Siuan Sanche and Leane Sharif. Joiya's death by Gray Man is original to the television adaptation.

=== C ===
- Jeaine Caide: Aes Sedai of the Black Ajah, and formerly of the Green Ajah. Jeaine is portrayed by Olivia Popica in season three of the Wheel of Time television series adaptation. In the series, she accompanies Liandrin to Tanchico, and is killed by Elayne Trakand with balefire.
- Gaidal Cain: A Hero of the Horn, known as the lover and companion of Birgitte.
- Adine Canford: Aes Sedai of the Blue Ajah.
- Canin: Captain of the ship Darter
- Taril Canler: Asha'man in the Black Tower, loyal to Logain Ablar.
- Anaiya Carel: Aes Sedai sister of the Blue Ajah. She is killed by Aran'gar.
- Carlomin: Tairen Lord who is Banner-General in the Band of the Red Hand. He leads a banner of cavalry in Altara.
- Galina Casban: Aes Sedai of the Black Ajah, and formerly Highest of the Red Ajah. She is portrayed by Clare Dunne in season three of the Wheel of Time television series adaptation.
- Romanda Cassin: Aes Sedai of the Yellow Ajah, and Sitter and First Weaver in the Tower. She dies in the Last Battle.
- Merilille Ceandevin: Aes Sedai of the Grey Ajah.
- Noal Charin: Member of the Band of the Red Hand and a Hero of the Horn, also known as legendary traveler "Jain Farstrider".
- Chiad: Aiel Maiden of the Spear and First-sister to Bain, she is the love interest of Gaul. Chiad is portrayed by Maja Simonsen in seasons two and three of the Wheel of Time television series adaptation.
- Rafela Cindal: Aes Sedai of the Blue Ajah.
- Serancha Colvine: Head Clerk of the Gray Ajah.
- Reanne Corly: Member of The Kin, secretly the protectors of many angreal and ter'angreal, including the Bowl of the Winds, in A Crown of Swords.
- Couladin: The leader of the Shaido Aiel and a false Car'a'carn. Couladin is portrayed by Set Sjöstrand in season three of the Wheel of Time television series adaptation.

=== D ===
- Theodrin Dabei: Aes Sedai of the Brown Ajah.
- Zerah Dacan: Aes Sedai of the White Ajah.
- Nisao Dachen: Aes Sedai of the Yellow Ajah, whose Warder is Sarin Hoigan.
- Mistress Daelvin: Innkeeper of the Golden Stag in Maerone.
- Masema Dagar: Shienaran warrior under Ingtar Shinowa who is present when Rand al'Thor defeats Ishamael at Falme. He becomes a wandering preacher known as the Prophet of the Dragon, announcing the arrival of the true Dragon Reborn. Followed by an army of zealots who rape and pillage in Rand's name, Masema eventually descends into madness, and comes to believe that Perrin Aybara is one off the Shadowspawn and must be executed. Masema is killed by Perrin's wife, Faile Bashere. Masema is portrayed by Arnas Fedaravicius in season two of the Wheel of Time television adaptation.
- Caraline Damodred: Cousin of Moiraine Damodred and wife of Darlin Sisnera, she is initially a rebel against Rand al'Thor.
- Raolin Darksbane: A previous False Dragon, gentled by the White Tower.
- Corlan Dashiva: Guise of Aginor while in the Black Tower.
- Latra Posae Decume: Aes Sedai of the Age of Legends, who in the 1996 short story "The Strike at Shayol Ghul" opposes Lews Therin Telamon's risky plan to reseal the prison of the Dark One, and unites all of the female Aes Sedai against it. Latra is portrayed by Katie Brayben in the Wheel of Time television adaptation, appearing via flashback in the season one finale "The Eye of the World" (2021), and the season three episode "The Road to the Spear" (2025). Ania Marson plays an older version of Latra in another flashback in "The Road to the Spear".
- Cetalia Delarme: Aes Sedai of the Blue Ajah. She is the former head of the eyes-and-ears for the Blue, and is killed by the Black Ajah.
- Talmanes Delovinde: Lord of Cairhien who leads the Altara contingent of three banners supplemented by a large group of crossbowmen. He is Mat's right-hand man in the Band of the Red Hand.
- Takima Deraighdin: Aes Sedai and Sitter for the Brown Ajah.
- Kumira Dhoran: Aes Sedai of the Brown Ajah. She is killed by Graendal in the Battle near Shadar Logoth.
- Bayle Domon: Captain of the ferryboat Spray who helps Mat Cauthon, Rand al'Thor and Thom Merrilin escape from Trollocs during their flight from Shadar Logoth. He is later captured by a Seanchan captain, Egeanin Sarna, who later marries and flees with him from the Seanchan. Bayle is portrayed by Julian Lewis Jones in season two of the Wheel of Time television adaptation. He sells Moiraine Damodred a poem found on one of the broken cuendillar Seals, which alerts her that Ishmael and Lanfear have escaped their prison.
- Norine Dovarna: Aes Sedai of the White Ajah.

=== E ===
- Eadyth: Aes Sedai and former Sitter and First Selector of the Blue Ajah.
- Egeanin Tamarath: Seanchan captain, known as Egeanin Sarna before being promoted to one of the Blood. She is later demoted and given the name Leilwin Shipless.
- Elswell: Aes Sedai of unknown Ajah.
- Renna Emain: A Seanchan sul'dam who takes command of an enslaved Egwene al'Vere. Renna is portrayed by Xelia Mendes-Jones in season two of the Wheel of Time television adaptation, first appearing in the 2023 episode "Eyes Without Pity".
- Chesmal Emry: Aes Sedai of the Black Ajah, formerly of the Yellow Ajah. She is ultimately killed by Elayne Trakand. Chesmal is portrayed by Mi Hae Lee in season three of the Wheel of Time television adaptation.
- Enkazin: Asha'man. Friend of Saml al'Seen from the Two Rivers.
- Demira Eriff: Aes Sedai of the Brown Ajah. She has one Warder, Stevan.
- Erith: Ogier, wife of Loial.
- Meidani Eschede: Aes Sedai of the Grey Ajah.

=== F ===
- Tarna Feir: Aes Sedai of the Red Ajah, who turns to the Shadow.
- Herid Fel: Historian and philosopher from Andor who is a mentor to Min Farshaw. Rand al'Thor consults Herid, who is a professor in Rand's school in Cairhein, on many esoteric topics. Herid is killed by a gholam to silence him.
- Dagdara Finchey: Black Ajah sister formerly of the Yellow Ajah.
- Damer Flinn: One of the oldest Asha'man, and the first to be tested for the ability. He is bonded as a Warder to Corele Hovian, and possesses the best male talent for healing, on par with Nynaeve al'Meara.
- Andaya Forae: Aes Sedai and Sitter of the Grey Ajah.
- Careane Fransi: Black Ajah sister formerly of the Green Ajah. She is killed by Vandene Namelle.
- Alviarin Freidhen: Aes Sedai of the White Ajah who becomes Keeper of the Chronicles under the Amyrlin Seat, Elaida a'Roihan. She secretly leads the Black Ajah Supreme Council within the White Tower, but is herself controlled by the Forsaken Mesaana. Alviarin is portrayed by Clare-Hope Ashitey in season three of the Wheel of Time television adaptation. In the series, she conspires with Elaida and her allies to depose Siuan Sanche and raise Elaida to Amyrlin Seat. Siuan is quickly stilled, falsely accused as a Darkfriend and sentenced to death. Alviarin personally performs the execution by beheading Siuan. Collider called Alviarin "one of the most detestable characters" in the novels.

=== G ===
- Ryma Galfrey: Aes Sedai of the Yellow Ajah, later enslaved by the Seanchan. Ryma is portrayed by Nyokabi Gethiaga in season two of the Wheel of Time television adaptation, first appearing in the 2023 episode "Damane".
- Gaebril: Alias of the Forsaken Rahvin.
- Gaul: Aiel Stone Dog. Companion of Perrin Aybara.
- Toveine Gazal: Aes Sedai and former Sitter of the Red Ajah. Bonded by Logain and Turned to the Shadow.
- Charl Gedwyn: Asha'man that was part of the plot to kill Rand al'Thor in Cairhien. Killed by Padan Fain/Mordeth.
- Marillin Gemalphin: Black Ajah sister formerly of the Brown Ajah.
- Androl Genhald: Asha'man in the Black Tower loyal to Logain Ablar. Extremely weak in the Power but with the Talent of making Gateways. Mutually bonded to Pevara Tazanovni.
- Basel Gill: Innkeeper of The Queen's Blessing in Caemlyn who strongly supports Queen Morgase Trakand. He accompanies her as she flees the city after being deposed. Basel is portrayed by Darren Clarke in season one of the Wheel of Time television adaptation. In the series, he is the proprietor of the Light's Blessing Inn in Tar Valon who helps Rand al'Thor and Mat Cauthon.
- Jur Grady: One of the original Asha'man recruits. Accompanies Perrin Aybara.
- Ailhuin Guenna: Wise Woman of Tear, provided shelter for Nynaeve, Elayne and Egwene.

=== H ===
- Merise Haindehl: Aes Sedai sister of the Green Ajah. Bonded the Asha'man Jahar Narishma as Warder.
- Shaidar Haran: Myrddraal. A principal agent of the Dark One.
- Morly Hardlin: One of the Asha'man in the Black Tower loyal to Logain Ablar.
- Faeldrin Harella: Aes Sedai sister of the Green Ajah. Killed in the Last Battle.
- Jurah Haret: Innkeeper of The Star in Tear.
- Bera Harkin: Aes Sedai sister of the Green Ajah.
- Yukiri Haruna: Aes Sedai and Sitter for the Grey Ajah. She was part of the group of Aes Sedai using the Oath Rod to reveal sisters of the Black Ajah in the White Tower.
- Artur Hawkwing: Full name Artur Paendrag Tanreall, general and emperor who conquered most of the story's world a thousand years before the Last Battle; similar to Genghis Khan and implied to be the source of the legends of King Arthur.
- Seaine Herimon: Aes Sedai and Sitter of the White Ajah. She was part of the group of Aes Sedai using the Oath Rod to reveal sisters of the Black Ajah in the White Tower.
- Eben Hopwil: Asha'man bonded by Daigian Moseneillin. Killed by Aran'gar as he attempts to shield his Aes Sedai from the Forsaken's attack.
- Corele Hovian: Aes Sedai of the Yellow Ajah. She bonded Asha'man Damer Flinn.
- Hurin: A 'thief-taker' in service of the King of Shienar. Has the gift of "smelling" violence. Accompanied Rand al'Thor in the world of the Portal Stones. Killed in the Last Battle.
- Hopper: Perrin Aybara's deceased wolf friend and mentor.

=== I ===
- Rodel Ituralde: One of the five 'Great Captains'. Fought the Seanchan in Arad Doman until being brought to the Saldaean front by the Dragon Reborn. Commanded the Army of the Light in Shayol Ghul during the Last Battle. Almost certainly Arad Doman's new monarch after the Last Battle.

=== J ===
- Agelmar Jagad: One of the five 'Great Captains', Shienaran, leads the Borderlander Army of the Light at Tarwin's Gap during the Last Battle.
- Eldrith Jhondar: Black Ajah sister formerly of the Brown Ajah. Killed by Doilin Mellar/Daved Hanlon.
- Janduin: Former Clan Chief of the Tardaad Aiel, and biological father of Rand al'Thor with Tigraine Mantear. Janduin is portrayed by Josha Stradowski, who also portrays Rand, in season three of the Wheel of Time television series in a flashback in the 2025 episode "The Road to the Spear".

=== K ===
- Welyn Kajima: Asha'man.
- Furyk Karede: Seanchan Banner-General of the Deathwatch Guard who leads the search for the High Lady Tuon in Crossroads of Twilight.
- Moria Karentanis: Aes Sedai and Sitter of the Blue Ajah. Also Black Ajah. Purged.
- Alliandre Maritha Kigarin: Queen of Ghealdan.
- Temaile Kinderode: Black Ajah sister formerly of the Gray Ajah. Killed by Doilin Mellar/Daved Hanlon.
- Tylee Kirgan: A general in the Seanchan army.
- Raefar Kisman: Asha'man that was part of the plot to kill Rand al'Thor in Cairhien.
- Mezar Kurin: Asha'man in the Black Tower loyal to Logain Ablar.

=== L ===
- Annoura Larisen: Aes Sedai of the Grey Ajah, advisor and companion to Berelain, First of Mayene. Burned out rescuing Galad from his battle with Demandred.
- Atuan Larisett: Black Ajah sister formerly of the Yellow Ajah.
- Amathera Aelfdene Casmir Lounault: Former Panarch of Tarabon. Love interest of Juilin Sandar.
- Haral Luhhan: Blacksmith of Emond's Field.

=== M ===
- Machin Shin, the "Black Wind"; a malevolent force occupying the Ogier's "Ways" between Waygates which steals the souls of those who touch it.
- Maigan: Aes Sedai of the Blue Ajah.
- Arel Malevin: Asha'man.
- Madresin Mandevwin: A Cairhienin. Banner-General in the Band of the Red Hand, he commands the crossbowmen temporarily attached to the Altaran cavalry contingent.
- Karldin Manfor: Asha'man. Bonded as Warder by Beldeine Nyram of Green Ajah. Killed by Sharans in the Last Battle.
- Tigraine Mantear: Daughter of Modrellein Mantear, Queen of Andor. Tigraine married Taringail Damodred and had a son, Galad Damodred. Following a prophecy from the Aes Sedai Gitara Moroso, she joins the Aiel as a Maiden of the Spear, taking the name "Shaiel'. She falls in love with Janduin, chief of the Taardad Aiel, but dies during the Aiel War after giving birth to their son, Rand al'Thor, on the slopes of Dragonmount. Tigraine is portrayed by Magdalena Sittova in the Wheel of Time television series adaptation, appearing via flashback in the season one episode "The Dark Along the Ways" (2021), and the season three episode "The Road to the Spear" (2025).
- Beonin Marinye: Aes Sedai of the Grey Ajah.
- Arymilla Marne: Andoran noblewoman. Put forward a claim to the Lion Throne following Morgase's disappearance. Attempted to conquer Caemlyn from Elayne, but was defeated and stripped of all lands and titles. Later offered new lands in Cairhien by Elayne.
- Joline Maza: Aes Sedai of the Green Ajah.
- Cabriana Mecandes: Aes Sedai of the Blue Ajah. Tortured and killed by Semirhage.
- Cadsuane Melaidhrin: Legendary Aes Sedai of the Green Ajah. Amyrlin Seat after the Last Battle.
- Melaine: An Aiel Wise One, portrayed by Salóme Gunnarsdóttir in season three of the Wheel of Time television adaptation.
- Melindhra: Aiel Maiden of the Spear who becomes Mat's lover in The Fires of Heaven. She attacks him and he kills her, realizing that she is a Darkfriend. Melindhra is portrayed by Synnøve Macody Lund in season three of the Wheel of Time television adaptation, first appearing in the 2025 episode "Seeds of Shadow". This version is Malkieri-born, raised by the Taardad Aiel. Revealed as a Darkfriend, she is sent by Lanfear to kill Lan, but spares his life and dies for breaking her Dark Oaths.
- Bonwhin Meraighdin: Aes Sedai of the Red Ajah who ruled as the Amyrlin Seat during the tie of Artur Hawkwing.
- Talene Minly: Black Ajah sister formerly of the Green Ajah.
- Atal Mishraile: Asha'man loyal to Mazrim Taim.
- Beslan Mitsobar: Heir to the throne of Altara, and later King. Friend to Mat Cauthon.
- Tylin Quintara Mitsobar: Former Queen of Altara. Mother to Beslan. Kept Mat Cauthon as her paramour. Killed by a gholam.
- Miyasi: Black Ajah sister formerly of the White Ajah.
- Ilyena Moerelle: Wife of Lews Therin Telamon and slain by him.
- Luthair Paendrag Mondwin: Son of Artur Hawkwing, who sailed across the Aryth Ocean and claimed the lands of Seanchan for his father's empire.
- Gitara Moroso: Aes Sedai advisor to Queen Mordrellen Mantear of Andor, and Keeper of the Chronicles to Tamra Ospenya. Dies from the strain of foretelling the rebirth of the Dragon. Gitara is portrayed by Hayley Mills in season two of the Wheel of Time television series adaptation, appearing via flashback in the 2023 episode "Daes Dae'mar".
- Fedwin Morr: One of the first Asha'man. Killed by Rand al'Thor as a mercy once Morr falls victim to the taint on saidin.
- Morvrin Thakanos: Aes Sedai sister of the Brown Ajah.
- Delana Mosalaine: Black Ajah sister formerly of the Grey Ajah. Balefired by Rand in the assault on Graendal's lair.
- Daigian Moseneillin: Aes Sedai of the White Ajah. Killed by Shaidar Haran.

=== N ===
- Kiruna Nachiman: Aes Sedai of the Green Ajah. Killed in the Last Battle.
- Malind Nachenin: Aes Sedai and former Sitter of the Green Ajah.
- Amico Nagoyin: Aes Sedai of the Black Ajah, formerly of the Yellow Ajah. She is portrayed by Zenobia Kloppers in season three of the Wheel of Time television adaptation.
- Aeldra Najaf: Aes Sedai of the Blue Ajah and Keeper of the Chronicles for Tamra Ospenya.
- Arlen Nalaam: Asha'man.
- Adeleas Namelle: Aes Sedai of the Brown Ajah. Sister to Vandene Namelle. Killed by Careane Fransi.
- Vandene Namelle: Aes Sedai of the Green Ajah. Sister to Adeleas Namelle. Killed by Chesmal Emry.
- Jahar Narishma: Asha'man loyal to Rand al'Thor. Bonded as Warder by Merise Haindehl.
- Berylla Naron: Aes Sedai of the Black Ajah, formerly of the Blue Ajah.
- Fager Neald: Asha'man of soldier rank. Accompanies Perrin Aybara in his mission to find Masema.
- Corianin Nedeal: Aes Sedai, Dreamer
- Ferane Neheran: Aes Sedai, Sitter and First Reasoner the White Ajah.
- Sarene Nemdahl: Aes Sedai of the White Ajah. She is more than beautiful and her warder's name is Vitalien. Compelled and used up by Hessalam during the Last Battle.
- Aludra Nendenhald: Aludra is an Illuminator originally from Tarabon. She created the Dragons and Dragon Eggs (Cannons and exploding cannonballs) with help from Mat Cauthon and Elayne Trakand.
- Varil Nensen: Asha'man.
- Pedron Niall: Former Lord Captain Commander of the Children of the Light. One of the five 'Great Captains'.
- Uno Nomesta: Veteran Shienaran warrior missing one eye, chosen to join the search for the Horn of Valere in The Great Hunt.
- Dafid Norley: One of the Asha'man in the Black Tower loyal to Logain Ablar.
- Nyomi: Diminutive Aes Sedai of the Black Ajah, formerly of the Brown Ajah. She is portrayed by Rachel Denning in seasons two and three of the Wheel of Time television adaptation. The character was created for the television series.
- Beldeine Nyram: Aes Sedai of the Green Ajah. Killed by Sharans in the Last Battle.

=== O ===
- Olver: Orphan and companion/adoptee to the Band of the Red Hand. Becomes Hornblower of the Horn of Valere.
- Daerid Ondin: Lieutenant-General in the Band of the Red Hand, he commands five banners of foot soldiers in the Murandy group.
- Faolain Orande: Aes Sedai of the Blue Ajah.
- Tamra Ospenya: Amyrlin Seat during the events of New Spring, formerly of the Blue Ajah. With Moiraine Damodred and Siuan Sanche, she is witness to Gitara Moroso's foretelling that the Dragon has been reborn. Tamra is tortured and killed by the Black Ajah.

=== P ===
- Berelain sur Paendrag Paeron: First (leading statesman) of Mayene. Romantically pursues Perrin Aybara aggressively until reaching an accommodation with his wife. Otherwise a cunning and intelligent politician and loyal ally to Perrin.
- Radhanan Paendrag: Seanchan Empress and mother of Tuon Athaem Kore Paendrag. Radhanan and her entire family except her chosen heir Tuon, are murdered by Semirhage, one of the Forsaken, before the events of Knife of Dreams.
- Birlen Pena: Black Ajah sister.
- Algarin Pendaloan: Tairen Lord with potential to be an Asha'man. Part of Logain's faction in the Black Tower, under the name "Emarin".
- Elza Penfell: Black Ajah sister formerly of the Green Ajah. Balefired by Rand.

=== R ===
- Tsutama Rath: Aes Sedai and former Sitter for the Red Ajah. Current Highest.
- Merean Redhill: Black Ajah sister formerly of the Blue Ajah. Mistress of Novices under Tamra Ospenya. Killed in Kandor by Moiraine Damodred.
- Reimon: A Tairen Lord. Banner-General in the Band of the Red Hand, he leads a banner of horse also in Altara.
- Rhuarc: Aiel clan chief, husband to Amys and her first-sister. One of Rand's primary allies among the Aiel, and in general. Fell under Hessalam's Compulsion. Killed by Aviendha in the Last Battle. Rhuarc is portrayed by Björn Landberg in season three of the Wheel of Time television adaptation, first appearing in the 2025 episode "A Question of Crimson".
- Manel Rochaid: Asha'man that was part of the plot to kill Rand al'Thor in Cairhien. Killed by Rand.
- Robb Solter: Soldier in Perrin's army.

=== S ===
- Colavaere Saighan: Cairhienin noblewoman. Conspired with Elaida's Aes Sedai to have Rand captured and transported to the White Tower so she could become Queen of Cairhien. Removed from power and stripped of all titles by Rand once he returned to the Sun Palace after being rescued. Committed suicide by hanging.
- Donalo Sandomere: Asha'man in the Black Tower loyal to Logain Ablar.
- Karale Sanghir: Black Ajah sister formerly of the Grey Ajah.
- Juilin Sandar: Thief-catcher of Tear.
- Elenia Sarand: Andoran noblewoman. Attempts to claim the Lion Throne following Morgase's disappearance, but is arrested and imprisoned by Dyelin. Later freed by Arymilla and forced to support her claim to the throne. Taken prisoner by Elayne after Arymilla's attack on Caemlyn is foiled, and stripped of all lands and titles. Later offered new lands in Cairhien by Elayne.
- Saml al'Seen: Asha'man native to Emond's Field.
- Edorion Selorna: A Tairen Lord. Banner-General in the Band of the Red Hand, he leads a banner of horse in Altara under Talmanes.
- Selucia: Shadow and Voice to Empress of Seanchan. Briefly Tuon's/Fortuona's Truthspeaker.
- Ispan Shefar: Aes Sedai of the Black Ajah, formerly of the Blue Ajah. She is portrayed by Olumide Olorunfemi in season three of the Wheel of Time television adaptation.
- Ingtar Shinowa: Shienaran nobleman and warrior who accompanies Rand on the hunt to reclaim the Horn of Valere, after it is stolen by Padan Fain in Fal Dara. Ingtar is killed by the Seanchan in Falme.
- Birgitte Silverbow: Hero of the Horn. Warder to Elayne Trakand. Killed in the Last Battle.
- Betse Silvin: F. Serving-maid in the Golden Stag. Mat dances with her VI-144.
- Slayer: A being born from the merged souls of Isam Mandragoran, cousin of Lan Mandragoran, and Luc Mantear, maternal uncle of Rand al'Thor. Slayer is a hunter for the Shadow, a master of Tel'aran'rhiod and enjoys killing wolves. He is killed by Perrin Aybara after lengthy rivalry.
- Masuri Sokawa: Aes Sedai of the Brown Ajah. She has one Warder, Rovair Kirklin.
- Someshta, the Green Man: Last of the Nym, a race of human-shaped plant creatures. He is the guardian of the Eye of the World who dies killing the Forsaken Balthamel.
- Carlinya Sorevin: Aes Sedai of the White Ajah. Killed during the fight in Tel'aran'rhiod against Mesaana.
- Sorilea: Aiel Wise One. Very weak in the Power, but arguably the most influential of all the Wise Ones.
- Fera Sormen: Black Ajah sister formerly of the White Ajah.
- Kairen Stang: Aes Sedai of the Blue Ajah. Killed by Aran'gar.
- Mattin Stepaneos den Balgar: King of Illian. Kidnapped by the White Tower under Elaida.
- Yurian Stonebow: A previous False Dragon who could channel.
- Aeldene Stonebridge: Aes Sedai of the Blue Ajah.
- Sulin: Aiel Maiden of the Spear, companion of both Rand and Perrin.

=== T ===
- Dobraine Taborwin: Cairhienin nobleman. Assists in the rescue of Rand from Elaida's Aes Sedai at Dumai's Wells. Later appointed steward of Cairhien by Rand.
- Mazrim Taim: Asha'man, False Dragon, and new Forsaken. M'Hael of the Black Tower. He used his position to secretly turn Asha'man to the Shadow. Killed by Egwene al'Vere in the Last Battle.
- Martyn Tallanvor: Guardsman-lieutenant loyal to Queen Morgase. After a lengthy and tumultuous courtship, Tallanvor marries Morgase while Perrin officiates.
- Samitsu Tamagowa: Aes Sedai of the Yellow Ajah. Her warder is named Roshan.
- Pevara Tazanovni: Aes Sedai and Sitter for the Red Ajah. Bonded to and Bonded by Androl Genhald. She was part of the group of Aes Sedai using the Oath Rod to reveal sisters of the Black Ajah in the White Tower.
- Therava: Shaido Aiel Wise One and master of former Black Ajah Aes Sedai Galina Casban.
- Tam al'Thor: Adoptive father of Rand al'Thor. Blademaster.
- Marris Thornhill: Black Ajah sister formerly of the Brown Ajah.
- Salita Toranes: Aes Sedai and former Sitter for the Yellow Ajah.
- Peral Torval: Asha'man part of the plot to kill Rand al'Thor in Cairhien. Killed by Padan Fain.
- Seonid Traighan: Aes Sedai of the Green Ajah.
- Nicola Treehill: Novice in training with the sisters in Salidar. Killed in Tel'aran'rhiod. Has the Talent of Foretelling.

=== V ===
- Chel Vanin: Former horse thief and poacher. The head scout for the Band of the Red Hand.
- Evin Vinchova: Asha'man in the Black Tower, Turned to the Shadow by Mazrim Taim. Tricked into (suicide) attacking his compatriots by Androl.

=== Y ===
- Yoeli: An officer in the Saldaean army.

=== Z ===
- Asne Zeramene: Black Ajah sister formerly of the Green Ajah. Killed by Sea Folk Windfinders.
