= The Fires of Heaven =

1993 novel by Robert Jordan

- Original cover of The Fires of Heaven, showing Mat, Rand, and Aviendha
- Author: Robert Jordan
- Cover artist: Darrell K. Sweet
- Language: English
- Series: The Wheel of Time
- Genre: Fantasy
- Publisher: Tor Books (U.S.) and [Orbit Books] (UK)
- Publication date: October 15, 1993
- Publication place: United States
- Media type: Print (Hardback & Paperback)
- Pages: 991 (U.S. paperback edition) & 704 (U.S. hardback edition)
- ISBN: 0-312-85427-7 (US hardback edition)
- OCLC: 29136140
- Dewey Decimal: 813/.54 20
- LC Class: PS3560.O7617 F57 1993
- Preceded by: The Shadow Rising
- Followed by: Lord of Chaos

The Fires of Heaven is a fantasy novel by American writer Robert Jordan, the fifth book in his series The Wheel of Time. It was published by Tor Books and released on October 15, 1993.

It is the first novel in the series to not involve an appearance by each of the three ta'veren from the Two Rivers, due to Perrin's absence. The Fires of Heaven consists of a prologue and 56 chapters.

== Plot summary ==
In Rhuidean, worried by news that Aiel from other clans join the cause of his enemy Couladin, Rand al’Thor confers with the Clan Chiefs who have recognised him as the Car’a’carn – Chief of Chiefs – on how to win over the four remaining Clans. Darkhounds attack and he kills them with balefire, a powerful weave that burns a person's thread backwards through the Pattern, undoing their past actions for a short time prior to being consumed by balefire. Egwene al'Vere continues to chafe under the instruction of Aiel Wise Ones, eager to learn faster than they think is wise, and Moiraine Damodred grows increasingly desperate to find her way into Rand's circle of trust.

In Tanchico, Nynaeve and Elayne set out for the White Tower—only to receive news that it has suffered a schism. Elaida, a Red sister and former advisor to Queen Morgase Trakand, has deposed and replaced the former Amyrlin Seat and ally of the Two Rivers friends Siuan Sanche.

Unwilling to accept an outsider as their prophesied hero, the Shaido and their allies follow Couladin across the Dragonwall to conquer the “treekillers” and wetlanders. Rand leads the seven Aiel Clans who have recognised him in pursuit and is followed in turn by the four undecided Aiel Clans. Along the way they are ambushed by Darkfriends and Shadowspawn but arrive in time to save the city of Cairhien and defeat the Shaido, in part thanks to the memories of long dead generals the Eelfinn have placed in Matrim Cauthon's mind. Couladin is killed in single combat by Mat, while Rand is attacked from afar by one of the Forsaken during the course of the battle.

As Rand establishes his control of Cairhien, a nation torn apart by scheming and war, he learns that the Forsaken Rahvin has deposed Queen Morgase who is presumed dead. Furious at himself for not acting sooner, Rand prepares to travel to Andor personally and kill Rahvin in revenge, but is delayed by Moiraine. Lanfear attacks Rand who is unwilling to fight back. Rand is saved by the sacrifice of Moiraine who foresaw Lanfear's attack. With Moiraine dead, Lan leaves to find the Aes Sedai whom his bond as Warder has transferred to.

Siuan, Leane and Min make their way to Salidar, where the Aes Sedai who have escaped the Tower after Elaida's coup have made a temporary base. Siuan subtly convinces Sheriam and the other Aes Sedai there that they must support Rand. Gareth Bryne follows shortly after, in pursuit of Siuan, and the Aes Sedai have him agree to help build an army for them.

Meanwhile, Nynaeve and Elayne seek out the rebel Aes Sedai accompanied by Thom and Juilin, discovering the forkroot herb that incapacitates channelers. Stuck in cities that are occupied by the Whitecloaks and with Elaida's agents trying to capture Elayne, they disguise themselves and join a travelling circus menagerie, performing acts through villages and towns. Despite Egwene warning Nynaeve through a dream about the dangers of the world of dreams, Nynaeve still visits Tel’aran’rhiod alone trying to work with Birgitte to track the Forsaken Moghedien. Eventually Moghedien traps Nynaeve and Birgitte in the world of dreams, and the pair narrowly escapes, at the cost of Birgitte being pushed into the waking world severely injured. Elayne bonds Birgitte as her Warder to help save her life.

The girls make their way to Samara, which is rife with troubles. Masema - who has named himself the prophet and taken over the city with zealous followers of the Dragon Reborn - and the Whitecloaks who have entered the town are on the brink of war. Nynaeve meets Galad there again, who has joined the Whitecloaks. Both he and Masema promise to help them get a ship to escape the city. After much trouble, Nynaeve, Elayne, Thom and Juilin, now accompanied by a band of Shienaran soldiers, make their way to Salidar.

Nynaeve confronts Moghedien in a dream again, but this time she is successful in ensnaring her with an a'dam. Finding out that Rand may be in danger, she drags the Forsaken along to help save him through the world of dreams.

Rand Skims to Caemlyn, where his forces enter a trap laid by Rahvin. Lightning bolts triggered by Rahvin kill Mat, Asmodean and Aviendha, which causes Rand to recklessly attack the Forsaken. His battle with Rahvin leads him into the world of dreams, where with the assistance of Nynaeve he destroys Rahvin with Balefire. Before waking, Nynaeve realises Moghedien is posing as a refugee in the rebel Aes Sedai camp and doses her with forkroot, allowing her to be captured in the real world.

Upon returning to the waking world, Rand discovers that his balefire undid the deaths of Mat, Aviendha and Asmodean. In the aftermath of the battle, Rand announces an amnesty on all male channelers, while Asmodean is killed by an unknown assailant.
