= Prophecies of the Dragon (The Wheel of Time Roleplaying Game) =

Prophecies of the Dragon is a 2002 role-playing game adventure published by Wizards of the Coast for The Wheel of Time Roleplaying Game.

== Plot summary ==
Prophecies of the Dragon is an adventure in which a campaign takes player characters from 1st to 7th level as they uncover and thwart a Darkfriend plot to sever the Dragon Reborn from the One Power.

== Reviews ==
- Pyramid
- Pyramid
- Backstab #8
- Campaign Magazine (Issue 5 - Sep/Oct 2002)
- Campaign Magazine (Issue 6 - Dec 2002/Jan 2003)
