= Natasha O'Keeffe =

British theatre and TV actor

- Born: Brighton, England
- Education: Royal Welsh College of Music & Drama
- Occupation: Actress
- Years active: 2008–present

Natasha O'Keeffe is a British actress. She is known for her roles as Abbey in the E4 series Misfits (2012–2013), Fedora in the ITV series Jekyll and Hyde (2015), Emilia Ricoletti in the Sherlock special "The Abominable Bride" (2016), Lizzie Shelby in the BBC series Peaky Blinders (2013–2022), and Lanfear in the Amazon Studios series The Wheel of Time (2021–2025).

== Early life ==
Born in Brighton to Irish parents from County Cavan, she was raised in Tooting, South London. O'Keeffe trained at the Royal Welsh College of Music and Drama, and starred in a number of their stage productions.

== Career ==
O'Keeffe first came to public attention in 2008, playing a member of the Royal Family who enjoys parties, one-night stands and drugs in the music video for "Falling Down", the last single released by Oasis before the band dissolved. That same year, she had a part in the feature film Abraham's Point.

In 2010 and 2012, O'Keeffe played Sadie in both seasons of BBC Three's drama series Lip Service, about a group of lesbians living in Glasgow, Scotland. In 2012 and 2013 she played Abbey Smith in the lead ensemble for the final two seasons of E4's comedy-drama Misfits, about a group of young offenders in a London community service program who obtain supernatural powers.

In 2013, O'Keeffe had a role in an episode of Law & Order: UK, and appeared in the feature films Filth and Svengali. In 2015, she starred as Fedora in ITV's TV series, Jekyll and Hyde. She also starred in a music video for Daughter's song "Numbers" as part of a series of films for the band's album Not to Disappear. In 2016, she appeared in the Sherlock special "The Abominable Bride" as the titular bride, Emelia Ricoletti.

From 2013 to 2022, O'Keeffe portrayed Lizzie Shelby in Peaky Blinders. She played Dr. Emma Grieves in the series Intergalactic in 2021. From 2017 to 2021, O'Keeffe played Charlotte Ross in the crime drama series Strike.

O'Keeffe portrayed Lanfear in the Amazon Studios fantasy series The Wheel of Time from 2023 to 2025.

== Filmography ==
=== Film ===
Year	Title	Role	Notes
2008	Abraham's Point	Sarah	
2011	If Found Please Return To	Her	Short
2013	Svengali	Natasha	
2013	Filth	Anna	
2013	A Little Place Off the Edgware Road	Wife	
2023	Widow Clicquot	Anne	
2024	Tyger	Maggie	Completed
2025	Whitetail	Jen	TIFF

=== Television ===
Year	Title	Role	Notes	Ref.
2010–2012	Lip Service	Sadie Anderson	Main role	
2012–2013	Misfits	Abbey Smith	Main role (series 4–5)	
2013	Law & Order: UK	Connie Moran	Episode: "Mortal"	
2013–2022	Peaky Blinders	Lizzie Shelby	Main role	
2014	Grantchester	Grace Heath	Episode "#1.6"	
2015	The Last Panthers	Kirsty Wilkinson	Recurring role	
2015	Jekyll and Hyde	Fedora	Main role	
2016	Sherlock	Emilia Ricoletti	Episode: "The Abominable Bride"	
2017–present	Strike	Charlotte Campbell	Recurring role	
2019	Rebellion	Agnes Moore	Miniseries	
2019	Temple	Chloe Myerscough	3 episodes (season 1)	
2021	Intergalactic	Dr Emma Grieves	Main role	
2023–2025	The Wheel of Time	Lanfear	Main role (seasons 2–3)	
2026	How to Get to Heaven from Belfast	Greta	Main role	

=== Music videos ===
Year	Title	Performer	Role
2008	"Falling Down"	Oasis	Royal Family member
2015	"Numbers"	Daughter	SAM
