= The Great Hunt =

1990 novel by Robert Jordan

- Original cover of The Great Hunt, showing Rand al'Thor holding the Horn of Valere in front of Selene and Loial
- Author: Robert Jordan
- Cover artist: Darrell K. Sweet
- Language: English
- Series: The Wheel of Time
- Genre: Fantasy
- Publisher: Tor Books (North American) and Orbit Books (UK)
- Publication date: November 15, 1990
- Publication place: United States
- Media type: Print (Hardback and Paperback)
- Pages: 706 (U.S. paperback edition) & 600 (U.S. hardback edition)
- ISBN: 0-312-85140-5 (US hardback edition)
- OCLC: 21902708
- Dewey Decimal: 813/.54 20
- LC Class: PS3560.O7617 G74 1990
- Preceded by: The Eye of the World
- Followed by: The Dragon Reborn

The Great Hunt is a fantasy novel by American author Robert Jordan, the second book of The Wheel of Time series. It was published by Tor Books and released on November 15, 1990. The Great Hunt consists of a prologue and 50 chapters. In 2004 The Great Hunt was re-released as two separate books, The Hunt Begins and New Threads in the Pattern.

The story features young heroes Rand al'Thor, Mat Cauthon, and Perrin Aybara, who join Shienaren soldiers in a quest to retrieve the Horn of Valere. At the same time, Egwene al'Vere, Nynaeve al'Meara, and Elayne Trakand go to the White Tower in Tar Valon to learn Aes Sedai ways. Finally, an exotic army invades the western coast.

== Plot summary ==
=== Prologue ===
Ba'alzamon presides over a clandestine meeting. In addition to Forsaken and Darkfriends, Ba'alzamon's known subordinates, the meeting includes two Aes Sedai and a Questioner of the Children of the Light. In this meeting, Rand al'Thor, Mat Cauthon, and Perrin Aybara are all mentioned.

=== The Hunt Begins ===
At Fal Dara in Shienar, following the events in The Eye of the World, Lan Mandragoran instructs Rand in sword fighting. Mat Cauthon's condition worsens through his psychic attachment to a parasitic dagger from Shadar Logoth. Padan Fain, the Darkfriend, is imprisoned. The Amyrlin Seat, Siuan Sanche, arrives, and identifies Rand al'Thor as the Dragon Reborn. At the same time, through their private conversations, it is revealed that the Amyrlin Seat and Moiraine Damodred have a secret plan for the Dragon Reborn and have been close friends for many years. Fain is subsequently freed by Darkforces who invade the castle in Fal Dara, stealing the Horn of Valere and the tainted dagger.

Rand, Perrin Aybara, and Mat accompany a Shienaran party southbound in pursuit, under the leadership of Lord Ingtar Shinowa and guided by a tracker named Hurin who can literally smell past violence. The Amyrlin departs for Tar Valon, taking Nynaeve al'Meara and Egwene al'Vere for Aes Sedai training. Moirane breaks off, unbidden, to seek answers. In Tar Valon, Nynaeve and Egwene befriend daughter-heir Elayne Trakand and the clairvoyant Min Farshaw. Nynaeve passes the test to become Accepted, a rank in the White Tower below Aes Sedai and above Novice.

Cover of The Hunt Begins

Rand, the Ogier Loial, and Hurin sleep near a stone. They wake up, separated from the Shienaran party, and transported to an alternative world similar to their own, but deserted and distorted. Rand suspects that he activated the stone by unconsciously channeling saidin in his sleep. (Rand's struggle to accept his channeling ability is a recurring element in the novel.) However, Egwene dreams of a woman standing over Rand while he sleeps, whose "eyes seemed to shine like the moon".

In this alternative world, Rand comes across a beautiful woman who is fighting off a creature unlike anything he's ever seen, but he ends up killing it. She says her name is Selene, she is from Cairhien, and appears to be a lady or even royalty. She says she also came to the strange world while sleeping and knows how to get back. One night, Rand meets Ba'alzamon in a dream and has a heron's image (the crest of his sword) branded into his palm in a fight. Selene explains how they can return by a different portal stone to their own world, ahead of Fain's and Ingtar's groups. When Fain does arrive, Rand and Loial sneak into his camp and retrieve the Horn and dagger. Still behind, and at a loss to explain Rand's disappearance, Lord Ingtar's group pursues Fain with the aid of Perrin, who uses his telepathic ability to communicate with wolves, which in turn can track Fain's Trollocs (the Dark One's bestial foot-soldiers).

Rand's party journeys to Cairhien, where Rand finds gleeman Thom Merrilin, whom he thought dead after the events in The Eye of the World. Rand and Loial are attacked by Trollocs and, during their escape, damage the Chapter House of the Illuminator's Guild, a society retaining knowledge of fireworks.

Rand receives unwanted, high-profile invitations from House Damodred and from the King. Hurin is attacked at the inn by Fain's forces, and the Horn and dagger are stolen once more. Ingtar's group arrives in Cairhien. Hurin traces the Darkfriends to Barthanes Damodred's manor. Using the now-valuable invitation, the path is traced further to a Waygate in the premises. However, they are prevented from pursuing by Machin Shin. Via Barthanes, Padan Fain tells them that he is taking the Horn to the port city of Falme in Toman Head. Thom's apprentice, Dena, is murdered for Thom's involvement with Rand.

=== To Toman Head ===
The invading Seanchan and their exotic beasts have occupied Falme. Fain gives the Horn to High Lord Turak of the Seanchan. Geofram Bornhald, leader of the zealous religious group Children of the Light, also known as the Whitecloaks, is preparing to attack the Seanchan.

Ingtar's group tries a different Waygate in a nearby Ogier stedding, but they find Machin Shin there too. Rand takes them via a portal stone instead, but they lose months. At the White Tower, Liandrin Guirale lures Egwene and Nynaeve, along with an accompanying Elayne and Min, to Toman Head via the Ways, handing them over to the Seanchan. Egwene is collared with an a'dam, a device used by the Seanchan to control channelers, while Min is held hostage. Nynaeve and Elayne escape.

Elayne and Nynaeve rescue Egwene from the Seanchan and attempt to flee the city. Meanwhile, Ingtar, Rand, Hurin, Mat, and Perrin enter Falme and retrieve the Horn and dagger, during which Rand slays Turak. Ingtar reveals himself as a Darkfriend, but redeems himself when he dies fighting. However, the Whitecloaks attack the Seanchan, leaving Rand's group trapped perilously between the advancing lines. Mat blows the Horn of Valere, summoning dead heroes, including Artur Hawkwing. The banner of the Dragon Reborn is unfurled, and they ride to battle against the Seanchan.

Ba'alzamon appears, and he and Rand fight, the duel projected into the air above Falme. Rand allows himself to be stabbed with Ba'alzamon's staff, giving him an opening to stab Ba'alzamon through the heart with his heron-mark sword.

With the battle over and the Seanchan defeated, Rand is found by Min and hauled into a bed to recuperate. Selene arrives, touches the sleeping Rand, reveals herself to be the Forsaken Lanfear, and disappears. When Rand awakens, he finds Ingtar's army under the dragon's banner, and they offer their pledge to him.
