= The Shadow Rising =

1992 novel by Robert Jordan

- Original cover of The Shadow Rising, featuring Rand, Mat, and Egwene in the Aiel Waste
- Author: Robert Jordan
- Cover artist: Darrell K. Sweet
- Language: English
- Series: The Wheel of Time
- Genre: Fantasy
- Publisher: Tor Books (U.S.)
- Publication date: September 15, 1992
- Publication place: United States
- Media type: Print (Hardback & Paperback)
- Pages: 1,007 (U.S. paperback edition) & 704 (U.S. hardback edition)
- ISBN: 0-312-85431-5 (US hardback edition)
- OCLC: 150103003
- Dewey Decimal: 813/.54 20
- LC Class: PS3560.O7617 S48 1992
- Preceded by: The Dragon Reborn
- Followed by: The Fires of Heaven

The Shadow Rising is a fantasy novel by American author Robert Jordan, the fourth book in his series The Wheel of Time. It was published by Tor Books and released on September 15, 1992. The unabridged audio book is read by Michael Kramer and Kate Reading.

At 393,823 words, The Shadow Rising is the longest book of The Wheel of Time while featuring fewer pages than Lord of Chaos. The Shadow Rising consists of 58 chapters. It is the only book in the main sequence of The Wheel of Time not to contain a prologue, although its first chapter fulfills much the same narrative purpose.

== Plot summary ==
Rand al'Thor has just claimed the crystal sword Callandor to prove himself the Dragon Reborn. He is approached by Lanfear who tells him of the Forsaken's plans. The fortress known as the Stone of Tear is stormed by Trollocs and Fades, sent by another Forsaken (Sammael), while a third, Semirhage, sends her followers into the Stone to oppose Sammael's forces. In defense, Rand uses Callandor to create a lightning storm killing all the Trollocs and Fades.

Rand then decides that he must travel to the Aiel Waste, to be acknowledged as the Aiel's prophesied leader. Before leaving, Rand, Mat Cauthon and Moiraine Damodred visit a ter'angreal that lets them talk to a mysterious snakelike race called the Aelfinn, who seemingly know the answer to any question. Mat learns from them that he must go to Rhuidean or die and also that he is destined to marry someone called "the Daughter of the Nine Moons". Egwene al'Vere and the Aiel woman Aviendha are summoned to the Aiel Waste, Egwene to learn Dreamwalking and Aviendha to become a Wise One. Thus, Rand, Mat, Moiraine, Egwene, and Aviendha all travel to the Aiel Waste.

Other characters in the Stone of Tear also learn that they must travel elsewhere. Perrin Aybara hears of trouble in The Two Rivers, his native region, and returns there accompanied by Faile Bashere, Loial and three Aiel warriors: Gaul, Bain and Chiad. Elayne Trakand, Nynaeve al'Meara, and Thom Merrilin depart to Tarabon to hunt the Black Ajah. Finally, Min Farshaw arrives in Tar Valon to report to the Amyrlin Siuan Sanche. Moving forward, The Shadow Rising follows four groups of characters in four plotlines.

=== Aiel Waste ===
Rand uses a portal stone to transport Mat, Egwene, Moiraine, and the Aiel from the Stone of Tear to the Aiel Waste, and are met by Taardad and Shaido Aiel.

Moiraine, Aviendha, Mat and Rand enter Rhuidean, the legendary forbidden city of the waste, where each enters a ter'angreal.

While inside his ter'angreal, Rand relives portions of his paternal ancestors lives (before and after the Breaking) and discovers the Aiel were once pacifists serving the Aes Sedai. Adherence to pacifism still lives on in the Tinkers, while others known as the 'Jenn Aiel' transported a large collection of angreal, sa'angreal and ter'angreal to Rhuidean. Rand emerges from the ter'angreal with dragon markings on both arms; proof that he is the Car'a'carn, the 'Chief of Chiefs' of the Aiel.

Mat enters his ter'angreal seeking more answers from the 'Aelfinn'. Instead, he encounters the foxlike 'Eelfinn' who bargain for gifts versus answering questions. Mat ignorantly requests several gifts from them: fluency in the Old Tongue, memories of his own ancestors, a spear called an ashandarei, and a medallion ter'angreal that protects against the One Power. Afterwards Rand finds Mat hanging from the Tree of Life (the price for the gifts he received). After his revival by Rand, Mat dons a black scarf to hide the scars around his neck.

Moiraine visits the three-hooped ter'angreal used by the Wise Ones, gaining limited knowledge of the future.

The Wise Ones task Aviendha with teaching Rand the Aiel customs as they travel to Cold Rocks Hold. They are met en route by Darkfriends and the Forsaken Lanfear and Asmodean disguised as merchants. After arrival at Al'cair Dal, both Rand al'Thor and Couladin of the Shaido Aiel claim to be the messiah 'He Who Comes With the Dawn'. To validate his claim, Rand reveals the secret history of the Aiel during the Age of Legends, but this incites an uproar among the Aiel. Rand prevents a riot by summoning a rainstorm to the Aiel Waste. Asmodean uses the momentary in-fighting amongst the Aiel as cover to seek out the ter'angreal access keys to the Choedan Kal (the most powerful sa'angreal ever created).

Rand chases Asmodean to Rhuidean where both simultaneously grasp the access key. The sudden power surge enables Rand to sever Asmodean's link to the Dark One (which marks Asmodean as a traitor to the rest of the Forsaken). Asmodean begrudgingly relents to teach Rand how to channel the One Power after Lanfear hobbles Asmodean's own access to it. Rand returns to Al'cair Dal to find most of the Aiel acknowledging him as the Car'a'carn.

=== The Two Rivers ===
Padan Fain drives the Children of the Light to the Two Rivers to exact vengeance on Rand.

The Shadow deploys Slayer, a mysterious and powerful agent together with a large host of Trollocs to kill Fain, endangering the Two Rivers.

Perrin's homecoming is dashed with tragedy when he learns Trollocs have killed his family. Perrin rallies new allies; Verin Mathwin, Alanna Mosvani, Aes Sedai searching for potential pupils, and the Tinker Aram (who has abandoned his people's pacifism) to fight the Trollocs. It is revealed later that Fain killed Perrin's family.

With the help of Tam al'Thor (Rand's adoptive father) and Abell Cauthon (Mat's father), Perrin convinces the people of the Two Rivers to fight for themselves. Perrin leads them against the Trollocs and earns the nicknames 'Lord Perrin' and 'Perrin Goldeneyes.'

Before the showdown with the Trollocs, Perrin marries Faile and tasks her with travelling to Caemlyn and asking Queen Morgase to lend soldiers in their fight.

The Children of the Light, led by Dain Bornhald, interject themselves and demand Perrin's arrest to try him for the murders of other Whitecloaks. Perrin agrees to give himself up if the Children will fight alongside the Two Rivers when the Trollocs attack.

Slayer is killing wolves in Tel'aran'rhiod but retreats when he is attacked and defeated by Perrin.

The Trollocs are defeated by the Two Rivers forces. The Children of the Light reneged on their agreement and sat out the battle, so Perrin and the Two Rivers folk force the Children to leave.

With his plans ruined, Fain departs for the White Tower.

=== Tanchico in Tarabon ===
Nynaeve and Elayne, along with Thom Merrilin and Juilin Sandar, are taken to Tanchico by the Sea Folk who reveal their own prophecies about Rand.

They meet Bayle Domon and Seanchan woman Egeanin. During their mission to smoke out the Black Ajah they also encounter Moghedien, one of the Forsaken. They discover that the enemy's goal is a male a'dam, held in the private collection of the Panarch Amathera, which they plan to use to control Rand.

Nynaeve and Elayne save Amathera from the Black Ajah and take the a'dam and a seal on the Dark One's prison from her palace.

Moghedien attacks and personally duels Nynaeve, finding that they are roughly equal in power. Nynaeve defeats Moghedien and shields her, but the Black Ajah cause a distraction with a balefire-creating ter'angreal, letting Moghedien escape. Finally, Nynaeve and Elayne send Domon and Egeanin to drop the a'dam overboard while far out to sea.

=== White Tower ===
Min continues to report to the Amyrlin and tries to avoid suspicion by taking the guise of Elmindreda, a giddy, empty-headed woman. She finds herself caught in a coup where Elaida and her supporters depose Siuan and Leane Sharif, her Keeper of the Chronicles, for secretly aiding Rand.

Siuan and Leane are both "stilled" (their ability to channel the One Power severed) and Elaida becomes the next Amyrlin.

Min frees Siuan and Leane, and all three are assisted in escape by Gawyn Trakand. Gawyn has joined the coup on Elaida's side, and killed several Siuan supporters, but Min convinces him to turn a blind eye to their escape as a personal favor to her. Logain Ablar, a former False Dragon who has been "gentled" (the male equivalent of "stilling") joins their escape from Tar Valon.
