= The Dragon Reborn =

1991 novel by Robert Jordan

- First edition cover showing Perrin Aybara and Mat Cauthon looking upon Rand al'Thor as he reaches for Callandor.
- Author: Robert Jordan
- Cover artist: Darrell K. Sweet
- Language: English
- Series: The Wheel of Time
- Genre: Fantasy
- Publisher: Tor Books (North America) and Orbit Books (UK)
- Publication date: October 15, 1991
- Publication place: United States
- Media type: Print (Hardback & Paperback)
- Pages: 624
- ISBN: 0-312-85248-7
- OCLC: 23900618
- Dewey Decimal: 813/.54 20
- LC Class: PS3560.O7617 D7 1991
- Preceded by: The Great Hunt
- Followed by: The Shadow Rising

The Dragon Reborn is a fantasy novel by American writer Robert Jordan, the third in his series The Wheel of Time. It was published by Tor Books and released on September 15, 1991. The unabridged audio book is read by Michael Kramer and Kate Reading. The Dragon Reborn consists of a prologue and 56 chapters.

== Plot summary ==
=== From the Mountains of Mist to Tear ===
Rand al'Thor, having been declared the Dragon Reborn by Moiraine Damodred, secretly goes to Tear to prove himself. Along the way he is hunted by Darkhounds and Darkfriends. Moiraine, Lan Mandragoran, the Ogier Loial, and Perrin Aybara follow him one step behind. Rand leaves a pattern of weddings and strange events in his trail. Perrin comes across an Aiel warrior that was captured and caged. He frees him, earning a friendship with Gaul, a Stone Dog, who will accompany Perrin on his travels. This event is witnessed by a hunter of the horn, Zarine Bashere (alias Faile), who joins the party as well.

Min reports to the Amyrlin Seat while Moiraine, Lan, Loial, Zarine and Perrin follow Rand. En route they battle Darkhounds and discover that the Forsaken Sammael rules in Illian.

=== From Tar Valon to Tear ===
Mat Cauthon is taken to Tar Valon by Verin Mathwin, Nynaeve al'Meara, Egwene al'Vere, Elayne Trakand and Hurin. Immediately after arrival in Tar Valon, Hurin departs to report to King Easar in Shienar. The Amyrlin Seat, Siuan Sanche, sets Nynaeve, Egwene, and later Elayne to hunting down the Black Ajah, and thus to Tear.

In the White Tower, through the use of a sa'angreal by Aes Sedai, Mat is healed of the corruptive influence of the ruby dagger from Shadar Logoth. Once healed, Mat defeats Galad Damodred and Gawyn Trakand in a practice sword battle using a quarterstaff. This wins him enough money to gamble with and purchase passage away from Tar Valon at which point he is approached by Nynaeve, Egwene, and Elayne to deliver a letter to her mother Queen Morgase. Mat reunites with Thom Merrilin and they travel to Andor, where Mat delivers the letter and learns of a plot by Queen Morgase's lover, Lord Gaebril, to murder Elayne. To prevent this, Mat pursues the killers to Tear.

=== Climax in the Stone of Tear ===
In Tear, Nynaeve, Egwene, and Elayne are betrayed by Juilin Sandar (under the influence of Liandrin) to the Black Ajah and imprisoned in the Stone of Tear, eventually rescued by Mat and a repentant Juilin. Faile falls into a trap meant for Moiraine and Perrin risks his life to rescue her. Rand and the Forsaken Be'lal duel in the Stone of Tear until Moiraine kills Be'lal with balefire. Ba'alzamon disables Moiraine and attacks Rand, whereupon Rand takes Callandor (a more powerful sa'angreal) and apparently kills Ba'alzamon; Moiraine argues that the Dark One, having no tangible body, is not represented by the dead man. Egwene, remembering a prophecy, instead deduces that the corpse is possibly Ishamael, Chief among the Forsaken. The Aiel in Tear conquer the Stone in loyalty to Rand.

== Notes ==
Among The Wheel of Time books, The Dragon Reborn stood out in that it only had a handful of chapters told from Rand al'Thor's point of view. Nearly all chapters are told from the perspectives of his friends and allies as they race to catch up to and help him. That said, his presence in the plot is ubiquitous; all major characters are either trying to help him or working against him.

== Release details ==
- 1991, USA, Tor Books (ISBN 0-312-85248-7), pub date 15 October 1991, hardcover (First edition)
- 1992, UK, Orbit Books (ISBN 1-85723-028-0), pub date 25 June 1992, paperback
- 1992, USA, Tor Books (ISBN 0-8125-1371-1), pub date ? October 1992, paperback
- 1992, USA, Gallant / Publishing Mills (ISBN 1-879371-29-4), pub date ? Nov 1992, audiobook (cassette)
- 1993, USA, Tor Books (ISBN 0-7653-0511-9), pub date ? September 2002, paperback
- 1995, UK, Orbit Books (ISBN 1-85723-065-5), pub date 31 December 1995, paperback
- 1999, UK, Orbit Books (ISBN 1-85723-024-8), pub date 6 May 1999 ?, hardcover
- 1999, USA, Rebound by Sagebrush (ISBN 0-7857-1633-5), pub date ? October 1999, hardcover
