= Robert Jordan bibliography =

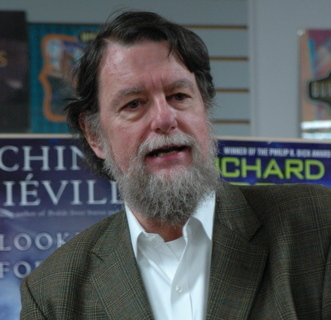
Jordan in 2005

Robert Jordan is the pen name of the American author James Rigney Jr. (1948–2007). He used several during his career, though Jordan was by far his most well known. To complicate matters, some reprints later used the more recognisable Jordan name alongside the original pen name in the format "Robert Jordan writing as…" This bibliography presents all works of Rigney's, sorted chronologically by their original pen name.

== As Reagan O'Neal ==
All O'Neal works were first published by Popham Press, Harriet McDougal's personal imprint.

Title	Year	Notes	Ref.
The Fallon Blood	1980		
The Fallon Pride	1981		
The Fallon Legacy	1982		

== As Jackson O'Reilly ==
Title	Year	Notes	Ref.
Cheyenne Raiders	1982	Rigney's only book not to be edited by Harriet McDougal; published under Tor's Forge imprint.	

== As Robert Jordan ==
All Jordan works were first published by Tor Books.

=== Conan the Barbarian ===
Title	Year	Notes	Ref.
Conan the Invincible	1982		
Conan the Defender	1982		
Conan the Unconquered	1983		
Conan the Triumphant	1983		
Conan the Magnificent	1984		
Conan the Destroyer	1984	Adaptation of the film. The ISBN application was filed before the film's title revision; some bibliographies incorrectly record King of Thieves as a distinct book.	
Conan the Victorious	1984		

Jordan also compiled a well-known Conan chronology; this was printed in the 1987 book Conan the Defiant by Steve Perry.

All of Jordan's Conan books were repackaged into collected volumes in the 1990s:

Title	Year	Publisher	Contents	Ref.
The Conan Chronicles	1995	Tor	Conan the Invincible, the Defender and the Unconquered	
The Conan Chronicles II	1997	Legend (UK)	Conan the Magnificent, the Triumphant, the Destroyer and the de Camp essay "Conan the Indestructible"	
The Further Chronicles of Conan	1999	Tor	Conan the Magnificent, the Triumphant and the Victorious	

=== The Wheel of Time ===
No.	Title	Year	Notes	Ref.
1	The Eye of the World	1990	Repackaged for younger readers as two volumes, From the Two Rivers (with a new prologue) and To the Blight	
2	The Great Hunt	1990	Repackaged for younger readers as two volumes, The Hunt Begins and New Threads in the Pattern	
3	The Dragon Reborn	1991		
4	The Shadow Rising	1992		
5	The Fires of Heaven	1993		
6	Lord of Chaos	1994	Locus Award nominee, 1995	
7	A Crown of Swords	1996		
8	The Path of Daggers	1998		
9	Winter's Heart	2000		
10	Crossroads of Twilight	2003		
0	New Spring	2004	Prequel. Expanded version of a 1998 short story.	
11	Knife of Dreams	2005		
12	The Gathering Storm	2009	Completed by Brandon Sanderson after Jordan's death	
13	Towers of Midnight	2010	Completed by Brandon Sanderson after Jordan's death	
14	A Memory of Light	2013	Completed by Brandon Sanderson after Jordan's death	

Short stories

Title	Year	Notes	Ref.
The Strike at Shayol Ghul	1996	Posted online, republished in The World of Robert Jordan's The Wheel of Time, 1997	
New Spring	1998	Published in Tor's Legends anthology, edited by Robert Silverberg, later expanded into full novel	
River of Souls	2013	Cut segments from A Memory of Light, completed by Sanderson. Published in Unfettered volumes.	
A Fire in the Ways	2019	Cut segments from A Memory of Light, completed by Sanderson. Published in Unfettered volumes.	

Encyclopedic works

Title	Year	Notes	Ref.
The World of Robert Jordan's The Wheel of Time	1997	Written in collaboration with Teresa Patterson	
The Wheel of Time Companion	2015	Based on Jordan's series and notes. Edited by Harriet McDougal, Alan Romanczuk, and Maria Simons	

Jordan's work was also adapted into a graphic novel series by Dabel Brothers, beginning in 2005. Only the first five issues of New Spring were published in Jordan's lifetime.

=== Warrior of the Altaii ===
Title	Year	Notes	Ref.
Warrior of the Altaii	2019	Written in the late 1970s and published posthumously	

== Other works ==
- Jordan claimed to have written dance and theatrical criticism under the name Chang Lung in the 1980s. He indicated in 1997 that only he had copies of it.
- Jordan also claimed to have worked as a ghostwriter; specifically for an international intrigue or thriller. He mentioned the book in 1993. The work likely predated The Wheel of Time given that in 2005 he stated he had written nothing else since 1984.

== Unpublished works ==
In 2012, Harriet McDougal donated a large volume of Jordan's material to the special collections of the College of Charleston. The library is in possession of several early unpublished works entitled John One-Eye, Morgan, April the 15th and You're a Nice Man or What Did I Do to Deserve That. These works are accessible to researchers, though some documents in the collection are restricted and will not be available for viewing until thirty years after his death (September 2037). Among the restricted folders is one entitled "From the Tale of Five Sisters".

== Jordan's proposed works ==
In his lifetime, Jordan spoke about several other works he planned on writing after the completion of The Wheel of Time's main sequence. As he died before its completion, these works were left unwritten.

=== The Wheel of Time side books ===
Jordan spoke several times about writing additional works in the setting of The Wheel of Time, but did not leave detailed notes. Brandon Sanderson, who completed the unfinished Wheel of Time conclusion, has ruled out writing these side books, noting it would have gone against Jordan's wishes.

=== Infinity of Heaven ===
In the early 1990s Jordan began discussing his next fantasy trilogy, to follow the completion of The Wheel of Time. It was initially planned as a single book entitled Shipwreck but Jordan later described it as two trilogies, with the second book titled Shipwrecked and the series titled Infinity of Heaven. He said that it would be a Shōgun-esque series about a man in his 30s who is shipwrecked in an unknown culture, which would be similar to Seanchan culture.

The main male character, who is shipwrecked there, comes from a place that might he considered a cross between Elizabethan England and the Italian city-states of the Renaissance with touches of the seventeenth century. I intend him to be a man in his thirties, a man of some experience and worldliness in his own culture (though this does him only occasional good where he finds himself), in contrast to Rand's innocence and naivete. The major female character is a noblewoman of the land where he is shipwrecked; by the law, whatever is cast up on the shores of her estates belongs to her: the ship, its cargo—its crew.

— Robert Jordan in a letter to Tom McCormick, December 1993

Jordan stated in 2005 that he had many ideas in his head and a good deal of it planned out but nothing yet on paper. There is a section among Jordan's contract records held by Charleston College marked Infinity of Heaven, dated 2004 and 2009.

=== Vietnam book ===
Jordan planned to write a book about his experiences in the Vietnam War as far back as the 1970s. He adopted various pen-names through his career; he planned to publish only this Vietnam text under his actual name. Jordan was concerned it was a difficult topic, stating that there were "…an awful lot of people who haven't come to grips with the war, what it did to them, how it changed them." By 2000 enough time had passed that he was doubtful about its cultural relevance, stating "If I wrote that Vietnam novel now, it would be a historical novel, and I'm not sure anybody's really interested anymore." He did however still intend to write it.
