= The Conan Chronicles II =

1997 collection of fantasy novels written by Robert Jordan

- Dust-jacket from the first edition
- Author: Robert Jordan
- Cover artist: Fred Gambino
- Language: English
- Series: Tor Conan Chronicles
- Genre: Fantasy novels
- Publisher: Legend Books
- Publication date: 1997
- Publication place: United Kingdom
- Media type: Print (hardback)
- Pages: 857 pp
- ISBN: 0-09-922492-5
- OCLC: 59658725
- Preceded by: The Conan Chronicles

The Conan Chronicles II is a collection of fantasy novels written by Robert Jordan featuring the sword and sorcery hero Conan the Barbarian, created by Robert E. Howard. The book was published in 1997 by Legend Books and collects three novels originally published by Tor Books.

== Contents ==
- Conan the Magnificent
- Conan the Triumphant, (includes the essay, "Conan the Indestructible", by L. Sprague de Camp)
- Conan the Destroyer

== Bibliography ==
- Brown, Charles N.; William G. Contento. "The Locus Index to Science Fiction (1984–1998)".
