= Tom Doherty =

U.S. publisher

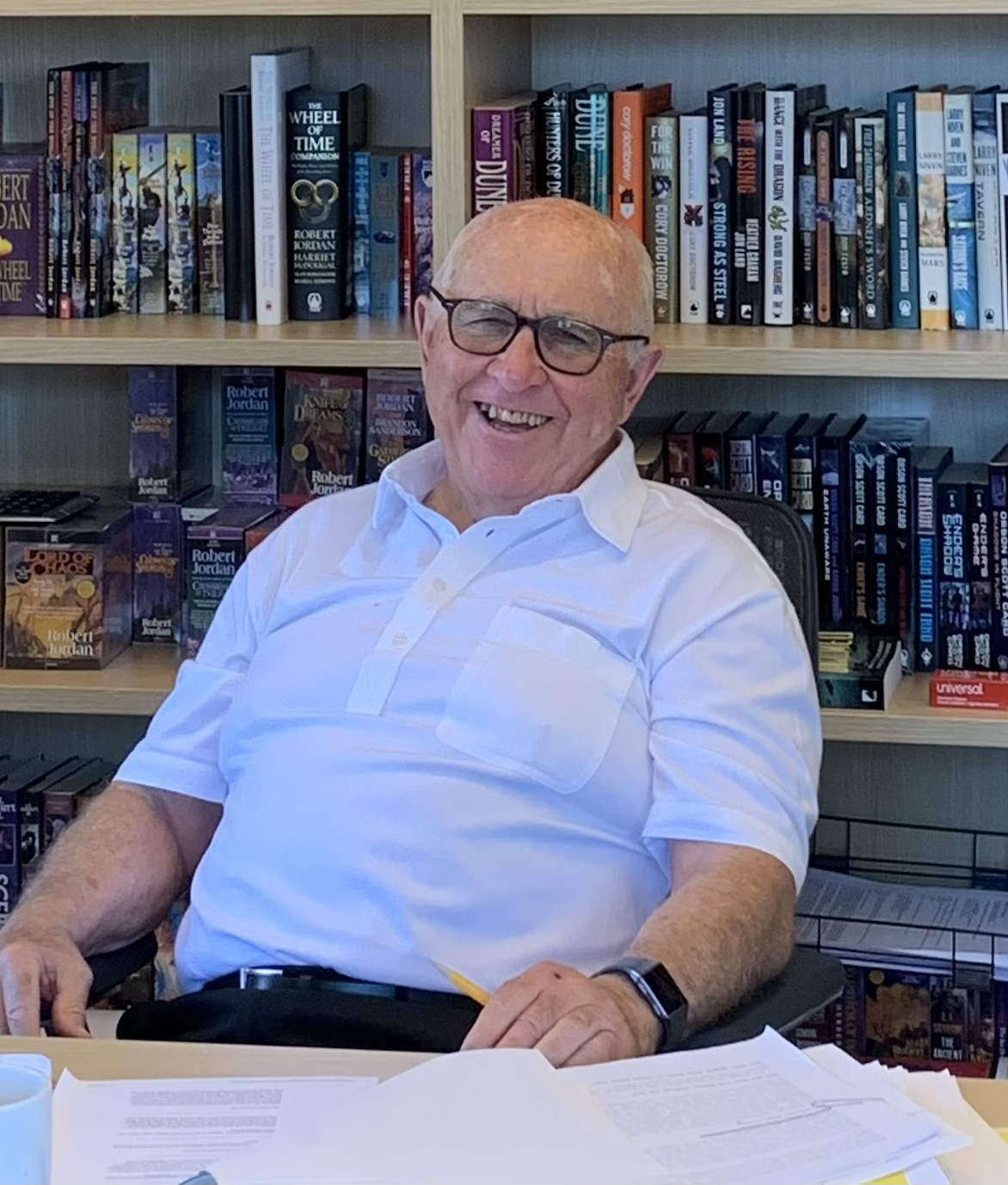
- Tom Doherty in his Tor office, 2019.
- Born: Thomas Doherty; April 23, 1935 (age 91); Hartford, Connecticut, U.S.
- Education: Trinity College (Connecticut)
- Occupations: Chairman, former President & Publisher
- Years active: 1958–present
- Employer(s): Tom Doherty Associates, Tor Publishing Group, Macmillan Publishers, Holtzbrinck Publishers
- Known for: Tor Books, The Wheel of Time

Thomas Doherty (born April 23, 1935) is an American publisher and the founder of the science fiction and fantasy book publisher Tor Books. He started as a salesman for Pocket Books and rose to be Division Sales Manager. From there, he went to Simon & Schuster as National Sales Manager, then became publisher of paperbacks at Grosset & Dunlap, including Tempo Books, in 1969. In 1975, he became publisher for Ace Books. In 1979, he left Ace to establish his own company, Tom Doherty Associates (TDA), publishing under the Tor Books imprint starting in 1980, which has grown to become the largest publisher of science fiction and fantasy in North America.

TDA became a subsidiary of St. Martin's Press in 1987; both are now separate divisions of Macmillan Publishers, ultimately owned by Holtzbrinck Publishers. Doherty continues as Chairman of Tom Doherty Associates (now Tor Publishing Group), publishing under the Tor, Forge, Tordotcom, Bramble, Starscape, Tor Teen, and Nightfire imprints.

== Biography ==
=== Early life and education ===
Thomas Doherty was born on 23 April 1935 in Hartford, Connecticut, to Thomas Aquinas Doherty (born 1914) and Elizabeth (née Story, born 1914). His father worked as an engineer for Pratt & Whitney during World War II and was part of the team that designed the United States' first jet engines. After the war, his father worked as a salesman and his mother as a post office clerk.

From an early age, he developed an interest in reading, especially science fiction. His mother and grandfather bought him a subscription to Astounding Science Fiction as soon as he could read independently, and he later branched out to reading similar magazines like Galaxy Science Fiction.

Doherty attended Marianapolis Academy (now Marianapolis Preparatory School) before enrolling at Trinity College (Connecticut). His major was initially chemical engineering, but he graduated in 1957 with a degree in philosophy after an abrupt change when he realised he did not want to pursue chemistry as a career. During college, he played guard in football, got tuition money as a "sub-rosa professional boxer", and was a member of the school’s Reserve Officer Training Corps.

=== Early career ===
After graduation, Doherty had initially planned to join the U.S. Air Force, but due to cutbacks in recruiting and being told he needed to lose weight to be a pilot, he was drafted into the U.S. Army and posted at Fort Polk in Louisiana. He spent two years there as an FDC artilleryman and doing a lot of reading in his spare time. His enjoyment of literature prompted him to search for a job in publishing when he got out of the army.

Doherty was first connected to Mory Solomon, vice-president of sales for Pocket Books through his father, who was now vice-president of Robbins Floor Products, Inc., a company doing work in Solomon's building. While Pocket did not employ him directly, he was given a job on recommendation as a sales rep working in the Boston north area for one of their national distributors, Select Magazines. This proved to be short-lived, however, as they were forced to let him go after only seven months due to the loss of a major contract. After being offered a local sales job for Pocket in Philadelphia, he moved to the city.

=== Pocket Books and Simon & Schuster (1958–1969) ===
Doherty progressed through various promotions in sales positions at Pocket Books, from salesman, to district manager, regional manager, divisional manager and national sales manager. In 1966, Pocket was acquired by Simon & Schuster and Doherty worked out of the New York office. At the time, S&S was also the distributor of Ballantine Books, and Tom became their sales manager. He became friends with Ian Ballantine and his wife Betty Ballantine. Working closely with the pair, he learned a great deal about publishing and editing, considering them "pioneers" in science fiction. During this time, they also published the works of J. R. R. Tolkien, proving that fantasy could be a best-selling genre.

=== Grosset & Dunlap (1969–1979) ===
After receiving a call from Harold Roth, a former executive vice-president of Simon & Schuster, now president of Grosset & Dunlap, Doherty could not resist the offer of changing from sales manager to publisher. In his new position, he headed Tempo, a Young Adult line. In 1971, he hired Harriet McDougal as editor in chief. In 1974, Roth persuaded their parent company, Filmways, to purchase Ace Books, one of the leading science fiction publishers, and the mass market publisher of Frank Herbert's Dune series. Doherty became head of both imprints with McDougal as editorial director. In 1977, he hired Jim Baen to head up the Ace science fiction/fantasy program. Also in 1977, McDougal returned to her home town of Charleston to found her own small publisher, Popham Press, which would be distributed by Ace, although she continued to do some editing work for Doherty. While there, she discovered author James Oliver Rigney Jr., more commonly known by his pen name Robert Jordan. In 1978, they published The Fallon Blood, Rigney's first novel, which became an immediate success.

=== Founding Tom Doherty Associates (TDA) ===
Following Roth's replacement as president to someone who Doherty found much more difficult to work with, he believed it was time for a change and decided to start his own company. Richard Gallen, who had funded McDougal's startup, provided the investment capital to found Tom Doherty Associates (now Tor Publishing Group) in 1979 and its first imprint, Tor Books, in 1980. Tor Books' first published book was released in November of that year. Both McDougal and Baen would come aboard as founding members of the editorial team.

== Tom Doherty Associates (1979–present) ==
=== 1979-1985 ===
In 1980, Doherty negotiated a mutually beneficial arrangement with Stan Reisner, a former colleague and then president of Pinnacle Books. According to Doherty, "the real value of a publishing company was not much more than the sum of the talents, the staff and the authors they would publish". To this end, Reisner would handle warehousing, paper, printing and binding, while retaining volume benefits, while Doherty and TDA would get a better base contract and concentrate on attracting the best talent.

Movie tie-ins for Flash Gordon and Popeye were rushed out by the end of 1980. In 1981, Tor published 54 books. Their first original novel, Forerunner by Andre Norton, came out in May of that year.

Doherty believed that to first achieve the goal of recruiting the best people, he needed to figure out "win-win" situations, which included being flexible about place, time and method of work. Doherty hired Harriet McDougal with the agreement she could work from her home in Charleston, bringing author James Rigney with her. David G. Hartwell, also working from home, brought in authors such as Gene Wolfe, Eric Van Lustbader, L. E. Modesitt Jr., and others. Hartwell also believed his specialist knowledge in science fiction would enable Tor to more effectively sell foreign rights in the genre. Doherty and he agreed upon a mutually profitable contract to expand Tor's rights outside of North America. Ben Bova, then a recipient of multiple Hugo Awards for editing, came to Tor to have more time to write his own novels. These were published by Tor, where Bova further acquired and edited other authors.

Building of the success of Rigney's The Fallon Blood under Ace, Tor would publish sequels, The Fallon Pride (1981) and The Fallon Legacy (1982). Following the 1982 Arnold Schwarzenegger movie Conan the Barbarian, Rigney would write seven Conan books between 1982-1984 under the pen name Robert Jordan. And when Rigney wanted to write his own fantasy series, Doherty signed him to a six-book contract in 1984 for what would become The Wheel of Time.

In 1983, Doherty contracted Orson Scott Card to write a sequel to his short story Ender's Game, Speaker for the Dead. Instead, Card wanted to expand his short story into a novel. Doherty trusted the relatively unknown Card and agreed a contract on the same terms as Speaker for the Dead. The novel Ender's Game, was published by Tor Books in 1985.

Also in 1983, Doherty became a co-founder and partner of Baen Books, when Pocket Books offered Jim Baen the chance to start his own science fiction line to compete with Ace, Del Rey and Tor. Doherty counteroffered by creating a line for Pocket to distribute. Initial capital was provided by Dick Gallen, who also funded TDA.

=== 1985-2007 ===
In 1985, Tom Doherty Associates' distributor Pinnacle Books went bankrupt. After large checks to creditors bounced, Doherty decided to go public to raise capital in order to pay off the debts. He received offers from both Simon & Schuster and St. Martin's Press, but ultimately decided to accept the latter offer in 1987, despite it being $2 million less, because it allowed Tom Doherty Associates to maintain autonomy.

By the mid-1980s, Doherty had moved Tor Books beyond its startup phase and was establishing it as a major force in American science fiction and fantasy publishing. Ender's Game became Tor’s first major hit, winning both the 1986 Hugo Award for Best Novel and the 1985 Nebula Award for Best Novel and becoming a best-seller, while its sequel, Speaker for the Dead, was similarly successful, winning the 1987 Hugo Award, the 1986 Nebula Award, and the 1987 Locus Award for Best Science Fiction Novel. In 1988, Tor was awarded the Locus Award for Best Publisher, an award it would go on to win every year in an unbroken record until 2024.

The first volume of The Wheel of Time, The Eye of the World, was published in January 1990, with the second volume, The Great Hunt, following later that same year. Doherty had backed the series, under Rigney’s pen name of Robert Jordan, with several unusual launch decisions, issuing The Eye of the World in trade paperback, pushing the third volume into a major hardcover promotion, and supporting the books with an extensive giveaway campaign that included 5,000 advance copies of the first novel and about one million sample copies of its opening section. It would become one of Tor’s major successes for the next two decades.

Doherty's daughters became involved at TDA during this period of growth. Kathleen began in special sales in 1985 and would found Tor Classics in 1986, engaging Wallmart to sell over 15 million special editions created as part of a literacy program. In 2007, both Kathleen and Doherty would be publicly recognised by the Committee on Ways and Means for enhancing and providing literacy programs throughout the US. Linda, later Linda Quinton, joined the company in 1986 as vice-president of marketing after first working at Dell and Bantam. Doherty described her role as critical to the growth of the company. She later headed the Forge imprint from 2016 until 2026.

The editorial team under Doherty was expanded, including Patrick Nielsen Hayden, Teresa Nielsen Hayden, and Robert Gleason, while the scope and focus was widened and refocused under new imprints. These included Tor Classics, (1986), Orb (1992), Forge (1993), and Starscape and Tor UK (both 2003). By 2007, Doherty had built a list whose growing prestige was reflected in repeated Hugo recognition for both Tor books and Tor editors, with further Best Novel wins, finalist placements, and editorial victories across the 1990s and 2000s. By the late 2000s, Tor was being described as the world's largest science-fiction publisher.

=== 2008–2018 ===
Although TDA already had an online presence before 2008, the launch of Tor.com in July 2008 marked a significant digital turn in Doherty's later career. In 2012, he made Tor and Forge ebooks DRM-free, removing digital-rights-management restrictions on purchased ebooks, and in 2014 he presented the new Tor.com ebook line as a way for science fiction and fantasy to reclaim the novella as a commercial form.

In 2011, Doherty and a group of science fiction authors attended a panel discussion between ten scientists from the Goddard Center for Astrobiology (GCA) entitled “Science Fiction & Science Fact: Extraterrestrial Life”. This coincided with a partnership between NASA's Goddard Space Flight Center and Tor-Forge authors with the aim of developing "NASA-inspired works of fiction" by linking Tor-Forge authors with agency scientists.

Doherty also remained closely involved with authors' work. Brandon Sanderson later said that, when Harriet McDougal was considering who might complete The Wheel of Time after Robert Jordan's death, Doherty had read both Elantris and Mistborn and specifically sent Mistborn to her; Sanderson subsequently completed the series for Tor, with A Memory of Light published in 2013. John Scalzi likewise described his 2015 multi-book agreement with Tor as a long-term partnership built around stability and planning, while Cory Doctorow treated Doherty's DRM-free policy as consistent with a publishing philosophy based on conversation and community rather than technical lock-in.

The results of those decisions were visible in the company's awards profile. Tor published Redshirts, which won the Hugo Award for Best Novel in 2013, while Tor.com titles, or those of the later tordotcom and other imprints of TDA, became increasingly prominent in the Hugo Award for Best Novella.

=== Chairman Emeritus (2018-present) ===
In March 2018, Doherty stepped down as president of Tom Doherty Associates. Fritz Foy was appointed president and publisher of Tom Doherty Associates. Foy retired in April 2021 and was succeeded by Devi Pillai as president and publisher of Tom Doherty Associates.

In August 2022, Tom Doherty Associates was rebranded as Tor Publishing Group. As of July 2025, Doherty continues in the capacity of "Chairman Emeritus", employed by Macmillan/Tor in an advisory capacity.

== Awards and recognition ==
Doherty has received awards and recognition for his work in publishing across a number of genres, including science fiction, fantasy, westerns, and thrillers.

Award	Year	Awarding body	Notes
Skylark Award	1993	New England Science Fiction Association	Awarded to those who "contributed significantly to science fiction, both through work in the field and by exemplifying the personal qualities which made the late "Doc" Smith well loved by those who knew him."
Lifetime Achievement Award	2005	World Fantasy Convention	Presented to individuals for "outstanding service to the fantasy field."
Raymond Z. Gallun Award	2006	The Science Fiction Forum and I-CON	Awarded for lifetime achievement for "outstanding contributions in the genre of science fiction."
Lariat Award	2007	Western Writers of America	First Lariat awarded to an individual. By this date, Tor had published fourteen Spur Award–winning novels.
Silver Bullet Award	2007	International Thriller Writers	First publisher to receive the award, recognizing outstanding achievement in the promotion and advancement of literacy.
Solstice Award	2009	Science Fiction and Fantasy Writers of America	Second recipient of this award given to those who have made "a significant impact on the science fiction or fantasy landscape, and is particularly intended for those who have consistently made a major, positive difference within the speculative fiction field."
Stephen R. Donaldson Award	2011	International Association for the Fantastic in the Arts	Only awarded seven times since 1997, it recognises exceptional support and service to IAFA.
Harris Collection Literary Award	2014	Brown University	Recognizes "leaders in the creative community for their outstanding contributions to American literature". Awarded jointly to George R. R. Martin the same year.
L. Ron Hubbard Lifetime Achievement Award	2016	Writers & Illustrators of the Future Foundation	
Thriller Legend Award	2017	International Thriller Writers	Inaugural recipient of this award "created to extend a special thank you to those who’ve made an extraordinary contribution to International Thriller Writers. People who’ve shown consistent and unwavering support."
Publisher of the Year	2018	The Strand Magazine	First recipient
Robert A. Heinlein Award	2024	Heinlein Society	Awarded "in recognition of Mr. Doherty's work in bringing the inspiring books of hundreds of authors writing about our future in Space to public awareness". Doherty is the only publisher to have been given the award.

In 2007, Doherty was honored with a proclamation from Charles B. Rangel, Chairman of the Committee on Ways and Means of the House of Representatives of the United States Congress, for outstanding leadership to enhance and provide literacy programs throughout the nation.

== Personal life ==
Doherty married Barbara Jean Slocum (born 1934, died 1996). The couple had three children: Thomas, Linda, and Kathleen.

In 1992, Doherty married Tatiana Pashina Doherty. They live in New York City.
