= Conan the Triumphant =

Book by Robert Jordan

- Cover of the first edition
- Author: Robert Jordan
- Language: English
- Series: Conan the Barbarian
- Genre: Sword and sorcery
- Publisher: Tor Books
- Publication date: 1983
- Publication place: United States
- Media type: Print (Paperback)
- Pages: 280
- ISBN: 0-8125-4234-7

Conan the Triumphant is a fantasy novel by American writer Robert Jordan, featuring Robert E. Howard's sword and sorcery hero Conan the Barbarian. It was first published in trade paperback by Tor Books in October 1983, and was reprinted in 1991; a regular paperback edition followed from the same publisher in April 1985 and was reprinted in January 1987, May 1991, and February 2011. The first British edition was published in paperback by Sphere Books in November 1985; a later British edition was published in paperback by Legend Books in April 1997. The novel was later gathered together with Conan the Magnificent and Conan the Destroyer into the hardcover omnibus collection The Conan Chronicles II (Legend, April 1997), and was later gathered together with Conan the Magnificent and Conan the Victorious into the hardcover omnibus collection The Further Chronicles of Conan (Tor Books, October 1999).

== Plot ==
Conan guides his army of mercenaries into Ianthe, the capital of Ophir, where they become entangled in the chaos ensuing from the death of King Valdric. The factions of Antimides, Valentius, and Lady Synelle (Countess of Asmark) all contest for the throne. Synelle is secretly a sorceress and the high priestess of a nearly-forgotten demon god known as Al’Kiir. Al’Kiir was imprisoned within the depths of a mountain, called Tor Al’Kiir, centuries before by a mage named Avanrakash. However, Synelle plans on releasing him by providing Al'Kiir a "bride" through human sacrifice and enlisting his power in obtaining the throne.

Conan comes to Synelle's attention after he buys an idol of Al’Kiir, which she believes can be used in reviving her god. She plans on obtaining the idol, sending various agents to steal it, and bewitching the Cimmerian into enlisting in her service. This attachment is complicated by Conan's interest in Julia, a young noblewoman reduced to trulldom, and his old rival, a female bandit named Karela the Red Hawk, one of many thieves Synelle has hired to steal the idol.

Ultimately, Synelle's true colors are revealed. In the depths of Tor Al’Kirr, she and her priestess attempt to sacrifice Karela to raise the demon. Conan and his company battle her forces and the Cimmerian wins—just too late. Al’Kiir is raised but takes Synelle instead of his intended victim. When the demon turns its attention towards Karela, Conan seizes the Staff of Avanrakash and spears the creature. At its unearthly screams, Synelle's defenders flee. Both Al'kiir and the captive sorceress harden into stone as the mountain begins to rumble. Conan and his men flee, putting as much distance as they can between themselves and the mountain before it erupts in a pillar of flame resembling the staff.

In the aftermath, the victorious army of Valentius marches onto Ianthe. The remnants of the Free Company, sidelined, break up, each going their separate way. Conan urges Karela to go to Argos with him, but she refuses, preferring her free life instead being mastered by the Cimmerian. He proceeds south alone. Meanwhile, Synelle is rescued from the destroyed mountain and brought back to life by Thoth-Amon.

== Reception ==
Don D'Ammassa notes "The ending is rather weak in this one and there are a few too many coincidences."

Preceded by Conan the Unconquered	Tor Conan series (publication order)	Succeeded by Conan the Magnificent
Preceded by Conan the Defender	Complete Conan Saga (William Galen Gray chronology)	Succeeded by Conan the Guardian
