= The Conan Chronicles (Robert Jordan) =

1995 collection of fantasy novels by Robert Jordan

- Dust-jacket from the first edition
- Author: Robert Jordan
- Language: English
- Series: Tor Conan Chronicles
- Genre: Sword and sorcery
- Publisher: Tor Books
- Publication date: 1995
- Publication place: United States
- Media type: Print (hardback)
- Pages: 510 pp
- ISBN: 0-312-85929-5
- OCLC: 32312110
- Dewey Decimal: 813/.54 20
- LC Class: PS3560.O7617 A6 1995
- Followed by: The Further Chronicles of Conan

The Conan Chronicles is a collection of fantasy novels by American writer Robert Jordan, featuring the sword and sorcery hero Conan the Barbarian created by Robert E. Howard. The book was published in 1995 by Tor Books and collects three novels previously published by Tor.

== Contents ==
- Conan the Invincible
- Conan the Defender
- Conan the Unconquered
