= Conan the Unconquered =

Book by Robert Jordan

- Cover of the first edition.
- Author: Robert Jordan
- Cover artist: Kirk Reinert
- Language: English
- Series: Conan the Barbarian
- Genre: Sword and sorcery
- Publisher: Tor Books
- Publication date: 1983
- Publication place: United States
- Media type: Print (Paperback)
- Pages: 286
- ISBN: 0-523-48053-9

Conan the Unconquered is a fantasy novel by American writer Robert Jordan, featuring Robert E. Howard's sword and sorcery hero Conan the Barbarian. It was first published in paperback by Tor Books in April 1983 and reprinted on a number of occasions. The first British edition was published by Sphere Books in February 1988. The first trade paperback edition was published by Tor in 1991. It was later gathered together with Conan the Invincible and Conan the Defender into the omnibus collection The Conan Chronicles (Tor Books, 1995).

== Plot ==
An evil sorcerer Jhandar wishes to raise an army of undead slaves, and his meddling with chaos brings him into conflict with Conan, who must battle his deadly ninja henchmen who can kill with a touch, and retrieve a weapon from a dent in reality created by the sorcerer's earlier botched experiments. A whirlwind of adventure ensures.

== Reception ==
Reviewer Ryan Harvey feels "[t]he book has a feeling of comfort food: neither challenging nor surprising, but providing decent sword-and-sorcery entertainment." He considers Jordan's writing style "like an over-imitation Howard," but "isn't bad despite its flawed approach to evoking old pulp prose ... [and] it still moves forward steadily and takes the reader along with it." He identifies "[o]ne of the book's biggest weaknesses [as] its women. They're basically trivial."

Don D'Ammassa notes "This was pretty good but a chunk of the climax involves one of [Conan's] companions whose staff turns out to be magic ... a convenient development just as it appears that Conan will fail."

Preceded by Conan the Defender	Tor Conan series (publication order)	Succeeded by Conan the Triumphant
Preceded by Conan the Victorious	Complete Conan Saga (William Galen Gray chronology)	Succeeded by "The Hand of Nergal"
