= Conan the Defender =

Novel by Robert Jordan

- Cover of the first edition.
- Author: Robert Jordan
- Language: English
- Series: Conan the Barbarian
- Genre: Sword and sorcery
- Publisher: Tor Books
- Publication date: 1982
- Publication place: United States
- Media type: Print Paperback

Conan the Defender is a fantasy novel by American writer Robert Jordan, featuring Robert E. Howard's sword and sorcery hero Conan the Barbarian. It was first published in trade paperback by Tor Books in December 1982, followed by a regular paperback edition in December 1983. The book was reprinted by Tor in February 1991 and September 2009. The first British edition was published by Legend in September 1996. It was later gathered together with Conan the Invincible and Conan the Unconquered into the omnibus collection The Conan Chronicles (Tor Books, 1995).

== Plot summary ==
The book opens around noon in the mansion of Albanus the wizard, Vegentius the Commander of the Golden Leopards (the bodyguard regiment of Nemedia's Kings), Demetrio Amarianus (a landowner), Constanto Melius (a noble), and Sephana Galerianus (the rejected mistress of King Garian).

They are gathered to plot the usurping of the Dragon Throne of the kingdom of Nemedia. During their meeting, Albanus demonstrates magic to placate and wow his guests by summoning a fire elemental to destroy one of his servants. The conspirators are impressed by this and desire to have some magical devices of their own: "As a token that [they] are all equals." Melius chooses a sword imbued with the skills of six master swordsmen. The sword grants its wielder sword mastery.

Moving the focus of the novel to Conan, it describes how the city of Belverus in Nemedia is unsafe, the tariffs exorbitantly high, starvation rampant, sedition brewing, and King Garian's ineffectiveness as a ruler. In reality, Albanus is busy funding and controlling all the unrest in Nemedia as a means of focusing hatred on King Garian. Conan is attacked in Belverus by Melius, who it later turns out was driven insane and "possessed" in a fashion by the tortured spirits in the magical sword which Albania gave him. Albanus didn't know that the blade could cause such madness.

Conan is rescued by the town guard who finds, to their horror, that they have just slain a noble.

Conan picks up the blade and wraps it with the hopes of selling his weapon for a few pieces of silver. Shortly thereafter, Conan meets up with Hordo, a friend of his from several previous and mostly unsuccessful quests who is now a smuggler. Hordo tries to get Conan a job as a smuggler as well but is punished by his boss for not being cautious enough (exposing a smuggler fetches a high bounty). Hordo decides to quit his job and join Conan in his mercenary venture.

Hordo is often used as a foil to Conan, contrasting the intelligence of Conan to Hordo's less sophisticated thought process and abilities of perception. The pair visit a tavern where Conan's fortune is foretold by an old man. The same fortune appears on the first page of the first mass-market printing. The first part of the prophecy comes true, as Conan thwarts an attempt by a lady patron of the tavern to pickpocket him.

Leaving the tavern, Conan and Hordo noticed they are being followed by what turns out to Ariane, a poet and patron at an inn called the Sign of Thestis. Suddenly, the three are attacked by an army of foot soldiers. Soon, all of the foot soldiers are slain. both Hordo and Conan spend the night at the Sign of Thestis, telling stories of their adventures. Conan learns that the patrons (including Ariane and Sephano, a sculptor) are plotting an uprising against the king along with Taras, and the mercenaries he's hiring, to aid in his coup.

Conan and Hordo are soon attacked by more armed murderers. Conan realizes someone is out to kill him, though he knows not who. It turns out later to be Albanus trying to recover the magic sword and cover up all traces of it. Upon returning to the inn, Conan sells his mystical sword to Demetrio, an agent of Albanus, for fifty gold marks. Conan uses the money from his sword to start his own free company of mercenaries and teaches them horse archer techniques unknown to the Nemedian forces.

The next time he returns to Belverus, Conan receives a message that he should meet Hordo at the Sign of the Full Moon. The patrons are worried that they may be betrayed, but Conan removes their fears by vowing he'll never betray them. At the Sign of the Full Moon, Conan is ambushed and attacked by assassins. He is also pursued by the Belverus town guard who have also been paid off by Albanus. The message was fake.

The next day, Ariane sets up a meeting for Conan with Taras to see if Conan can be hired for the uprising. It turns out Taras is not hiring mercenaries and intends to kill Conan as per Albanus'brequest. Their attempt is thwarted and the assassins are all killed by Conan. Ariane, having followed Conan, sees the butchery and believes that Conan has betrayed them. The horse archer skills get Conan's company a job in the Nemedian military and Conan a room within the palace, much to the dismay of Vegentius the conspirator. Conan winds up practicing his sword skills with King Garian and besting Garian each time.

Meanwhile, Albanus has captured Stephano the sculptor, and forced him to create a likeness of King Garian. Conan is asked by the king to deliver a letter to Albanus. While at the palace, Conan sees Stephano and later tells Ariane where Stephano has gone. Ariane goes to find Stephano at the wizard's mansion but is captured and hypnotized by Albanus. During a walk through the palace grounds, Conan and Hordo come across Vegentius wrestling with his men in tests of strength. Seeing Conan, he challenges him. Conan defeats him after a long battle where the two giants trade blows that would fell a normal man. Conan now recognizes Vegentius as one of the men who plotted against the king and attempted to kill Conan in an ambush the other evening.

Shortly afterward, King Garian summons Conan to his throne room. The king wants Conan to deliver a message to Lord Albanus because he must borrow money from him because the kingdom is running out of money. Conan takes this opportunity to tell him of Valentius's plans to see the king dethroned. King Garian, listens to him and then assures Conan that Valentius has been loyal to him and not to worry. As Conan and his free company ride through the city to leave, Hordo tells him of strange changes where people have been clearing the streets as if afraid of something or given orders to do so.

Conan arrives at Albanus' mansion. where he's questioned at sword point by the lord's guards of his intent. Conan grows suspicious when the guards and staff don't treat a royal messenger with hospitality. While waiting, Conan sees a drunken Stephano in the courtyard below. Furious that the gods would send Conan, the man he wanted dead, to deliver a message and taunting him, Albanus sets his plan in motion. Fortunately, Ariane breaks free from her enchantment and warns Conan about the wizard's true motives.

== Reception ==
Reviewer Ryan Harvey considers this, Jordan's second Conan story, "a lesser novel" than the first, Conan the Invincible, but "can recommend [it] as a satisfying if flawed" entry in the series. He finds "much to enjoy in Conan the Defender, noting that "Jordan has the writing chops to pull off the story," which "makes for a good read" and "reads easily. The pages fly past, even away from the furious action." He praises the author's "action set-pieces [as] some of the best and most clearly described from any pastiche author, and he comes up with clever combat ideas." Harvey finds the palace-storming finale "exciting" and "enjoyable" and notes that "Jordan even manages to toss in a snappy plot twist that genuinely surprises." He also considers the heroine Ariane "a refreshing change from the 'helpless wench' or 'tough warrior woman' cliché [who] has realism to her found infrequently in this kind of tale."

On the downside, "[t]he story bogs down in places where too many characters get involved in conspiracies ... a few of [which] never amount to much," and "[s]ome parts of the plot are never explained." Harvey feels "the novel's major flaw" is that "[f]or more than half of the book, Conan has scant reason to get involved," and "not until late in the book does [he] really find a place in the story." The author "provides no major 'turning point' or 'moment of realization' that seals Conan into the plot and gives him a strong direction." In regard to Jordan's style, Harvey criticizes "his occasional reliance on archaic English words that feel out of place."

Don D'Ammassa called the novel "One of the better Conan pastiches."

Preceded by Conan the Invincible	Tor Conan series (publication order)	Succeeded by Conan the Unconquered
Preceded by Conan the Savage	Complete Conan Saga (William Galen Gray chronology)	Succeeded by Conan the Triumphant
