= Conan the Victorious =

Book by Robert Jordan

- Cover of the first edition
- Author: Robert Jordan
- Cover artist: Boris Vallejo
- Language: English
- Series: Conan the Barbarian
- Genre: Sword and sorcery
- Publisher: Tor Books
- Publication date: 1984
- Publication place: United States
- Media type: Print (Paperback)
- Pages: 280
- ISBN: 0-8125-4240-1

Conan the Victorious is a fantasy novel by American writer Robert Jordan, featuring Robert E. Howard's sword and sorcery hero Conan the Barbarian. It was first published in trade paperback by Tor Books in November 1984; a regular paperback edition followed from the same publisher in December 1985 and was reprinted in March 1991 and August 2010. The first British edition was published in paperback by Sphere Books in April 1987. The novel was later gathered together with Conan the Magnificent and Conan the Triumphant into the hardcover omnibus collection The Further Chronicles of Conan (Tor Books, October 1999).

The book also includes "Conan the Indestructible", a chronological essay by L. Sprague de Camp.

== Plot ==
Naipal, court wizard to King Bandharkar of the city-state of Ayodhya in Vendyha, prepares to bargain with a demon, Masrock, to win control of the kingdom and rid himself of his rivals, the Black Seets of Mt. Yimsha. Meanwhile, in the Turanian city of Sultanapur, a Vendhyan-supported plot has resulted in the assassination of a prince. Conan, employed in guarding a smugglers' ship, is rumored to have been hired to commit the crime. Turanian spymaster Lord Khalid sends his apprentice, Jelal, into Vendhya to find out if a northerner was truly involved.

Running for his life, Conan eventually makes it to the docks and his friend/fellow smuggler Hordo, whom he met during his time with Karela the Red Hawk. Hordo suggests that Conan leave with him on his next delivery of "fish" and he agrees. While examining the chests, they feel strangely light and, when questioned, the Vendhyan merchant who owns the crates flees. However, as he escapes, the merchant accidentally slices Conan with a hidden blade. The crates contain nothing except dried leaves of an unknown origin. Unfortunately, the blade was poisoned and Conan discovers that the antidote may lie in Vendhya, the original destination of their cargo.

At the mouth of the Zaporaska River in Vendhya, the smugglers question a guild of Vendhyan merchants who are receiving their cargo. After discovering their chests have been tampered with, the merchants accept Hordo's explanation in a suspicious way. Moments later, Conan and his crew learn that the Vendhyans were planning to kill them once their cargo was delivered. Soon, an army of Vendhyan tribesmen attack and set their ship alight, stranding them. During the battle, Conan gets close enough to see a caravan loading their crates. Unsure if the caravan will be friendly or not, the crew split up, one group will follow the caravan, and another will return home by walking along the coast.

Conan's crew eventually close the distance and, by nightfall, have come within feet from the caravan's distant bonfire. Conan assumes the identity of a Vendhyan merchant and, after a brief conversation with the captain of the caravan guard, they learn that the owner will speak with them in the morning. During the night, a Khitan merchant approaches the smugglers and offers in hiring them as his guards.

In Vendhya, Naipal discovers Conan has become embroiled in his schemes. Believing Conan's involvement is purposeful, he plans to kill both the Cimmerian and his companions. After his agents in the caravan attempt without success in slaying Conan, Naipal lays a trap for him in the lost city of Gwandiakan. Soon, Conan takes the bait. Lured into an ancient tower, he's attacked by a swarm of cobras and narrowly escapes. Afterward, Conan searches for an antidote to his poisoned wound in a nearby forest, where he has been told it can be located. Soon, he discovers the herbalist who originally treated him and learns he was in fact cured by his first treatment; the man had lied about it then to secure the Cimmerian's aid. He, presumably, is Naipal's true adversary. A final conflict between the two sorcerers ensues, in which both end up dead at the hands of the demon each tried to control, and the demon itself is destroyed by the spells they had lain on it.

Conan, surviving, decides to return home. On the way, he encounters Lord Khalid's agent Jelal. The spy has completed his investigations and cleared the Cimmerian of complicity in the Vendhyan plot against Turan. He gives Conan a parchment and instructs him to present it at the headquarters of the Turanian army on his return to Sultanpur.

== Reception ==
Don D'Ammassa writes "As always Jordan told a good story, but the repetition of the same basic plot is not relieved by the few minor variations that he adds."

Ryan Harvey, in an aside to a review of another Conan novel, calls the book a "poor work" from an "otherwise skilled pastiche writer" on which he "would hate to judge" Jordan.

Preceded by Conan the Destroyer	Tor Conan series (publication order)	Succeeded by Conan the Valorous
Preceded by "Rogues in the House"	Complete Conan Saga (William Galen Gray chronology)	Succeeded by Conan the Unconquered
