= The World of Robert Jordan's The Wheel of Time =

Encyclopaedia by Robert Jordan and Teresa Patterson

- Author: Teresa Patterson
- Language: English
- Series: The Wheel of Time
- Genre: Fantasy
- Publisher: Tor Books; Orbit
- Publication date: 6 November 1997
- Publication place: United States
- Media type: Print (hardback and paperback), e-book
- Pages: 304 (hardcover)
- Followed by: The Wheel of Time Companion

The World of Robert Jordan's The Wheel of Time is an encyclopedia for the bestselling The Wheel of Time epic fantasy series of novels by Robert Jordan about the unnamed world where the plot takes place, which is often referred to by fans of the series as the World of the Wheel. It is published in the United States by Tor Books and in the United Kingdom by Orbit Books. Teresa Patterson wrote the bulk of the text based on notes and information provided by Jordan, who also serves as the overall editor on the project. While the information in the guide is broadly canonical, the book is deliberately written with vague, biased, or even downright false (or guessed) information in places, as Patterson felt this would reflect a key theme of the series (the mutability of knowledge across time and distance).

== Publication history ==
The book has been printed in several formats. The original release on 6 November 1997 was a large-format hardback with a predominantly white cover. This led to the book being dubbed 'The Big White Book' by fans. Some additional fans, citing poor quality of the internal illustrations (and poor accuracy of the illustrations as pointed out even by the book itself in the section title "Some Narrative Paintings of Questionable Authenticity"), have dubbed the volume "The Big Book With Bad Art" and "The Big White Book of Bad Art." This edition of the book runs to 304 pages. The book was reprinted in a slightly different edition of the same size a year later. This edition has a different cover (a map of the Westlands) and the gallery has been expanded to include the cover of the eighth novel, The Path of Daggers, which was released simultaneously. A large-format paperback edition followed in November 1999. On 6 June 2002, Orbit re-released the book as a 461-page mass-market paperback, stripped of all illustrations apart from the maps. This is the 'current' UK edition.

== Description ==
The book is an attempt to fill in the enormous backstory of The Wheel of Time novels and serves as a 'guidebook' to the world presented in the books. The original large editions of the book were presented with full-colour art by Todd Cameron Hamilton and include maps by Ellisa Mitchell, John M. Ford, and Thomas Canty. The covers of the novels, painted by Darrell K. Sweet, were also included. However, the mass-market paperback editions only include the Mitchell, Ford, and Canty maps. The original artwork by Hamilton was fiercely criticised on release.

The book consists of six sections, outlined as follows:

- The Wheel and the Power: a description and explanation of The Wheel of Time, the True Source, the One Power, the relationships between the three, and how they are tapped and used.
- The Age of Legends: a historical overview of the Age of Legends, the War of the Shadow, and the Breaking of the World. Includes biographies, character studies of the thirteen Forsaken, and information on the Friends of the Dark and Shadowspawn.
- The World Since the Breaking: a historical overview of events since the Breaking, including the founding of the White Tower and the rise of the Ten Nations, the Trolloc Wars, the rise of Artur Hawkwing in the War of the Second Dragon, the colonisation of Seanchan, the War of the Hundred Years, the start of the New Era, the Whitecloak War, and the Aiel War.
- Narrative Paintings: the cover artwork for the first seven (expanded to eight in later editions) novels in the series. This section is missing from mass-market paperback editions of the book.
- The World of the Wheel: a gazetteer to the world of the novels, including information on Shara, Seanchan, the Aiel Waste, the Land of the Madmen, and the Ogier. A map of the whole world is shown, along with a more detailed map of Shara and the Aiel Waste, as well as another of the Seanchan home continent. Information on history, customs, and the Seanchan exotic animals is also included.
- Within the Land: focuses on the fourteen nations and the major city-states that make up the main continent shown in the books, featuring information on holidays, prophecies, military forces, governments, trade, and the influence of the Aes Sedai.
