= Conan the Invincible =

Book by Robert Jordan

- Cover
- Author: Robert Jordan
- Language: English
- Series: Conan the Barbarian
- Genre: Sword and sorcery
- Publisher: Tor Books
- Publication date: 1982
- Publication place: United States
- Media type: Print (Paperback)
- Pages: 284
- ISBN: 0-523-48050-4

Conan the Invincible is a fantasy novel by American writer Robert Jordan, featuring Robert E. Howard's sword and sorcery hero Conan the Barbarian. It was first published in paperback by Tor Books in June 1982 and reprinted in July 1990; a trade paperback edition followed by the same publisher in 1998. The first British edition was published in paperback by Sphere Books in September 1989; a later British edition was published in paperback by Legend Books in August 1996. It was later gathered together with Conan the Defender and Conan the Unconquered into the hardcover omnibus collection The Conan Chronicles (Tor Books, July 1995).

== Plot summary ==
Amanar the Necromancer, in his lair in the Kezankian Mountains, sacrifices to his demonic patron, Morath-Aminee, for protection against the Black Ring, a league of sorcerers he has betrayed. Meanwhile, in a Shadizar tavern, Conan mulls over prospects for his next theft, in between incidental quarrels with one woman and the rescue of another who fails to thank him. He is hired by a supposed merchant to steal some pendants in the possession of the King of Zamora. The merchant is actually Imhep-Aton, an agent of the Black Ring, who intends on using these artifacts against Amanar.

The Cimmerian makes an attempt on the palace, convincing the slave girl Velita to help him steal the pendants in exchange for her freedom, but the heist is interrupted and the alarm sounded. He escapes but finds the next morning that the pendants and Velita have been stolen by someone else. He sets out in pursuit, along with, unknown to him, the king's cavalry and Imhep-Aton, who assumes Conan himself has absconded with the goods.

At a desert oasis, Conan saves a woman from bandits — the same he had earlier aided in the tavern - and with her continues his pursuit of the caravan. He catches up to what he believes is it, only to have the woman reveal herself as the infamous raider Karela the Red Hawk, and the band he has discovered as hers. Karela's men overpower the Cimmerian and take him, prisoner. However, Conan ingratiates himself with the raiders, and together they resume the pursuit of the caravan, while they themselves continue to be pursued by the Zamorans and the agent of the Black Ring.

Karela's band, trapped between tribal hillmen and the Zamoran cavalry, slip away to let their adversaries fight each other, before coming under attack by Amanar's reptilian underlings. Fighting them off, they track the reptilian creatures toward Amanar's keep.

The necromancer attempts guile, entertaining Conan and Karela while claiming no knowledge of the girl or the pendants, and offering to hire them. Conan, distrustful, returns by night and discovers Velita, but an enchantment prevents her from being removed from the stronghold.

Conan ends up in Amanar's dungeon together with several others, including Karela's lieutenant and the Zamoran captain. Together, they plan an escape. They make their break in time to see Amanar's keep-stormed by an army of hillmen. In the chaos, Conan and Imhep-Aton both assault Amanar as he summons Morath-Aminee. The Eater of Souls destroys Imhep-Aton and Amanar as well but is slain in turn by the necromancer's spells. With their deaths, the castle collapses, but Conan rescues Velita and escapes. Karela, who had been ensorcelled by Amanar, also gets away.

Conan, having freed Velita as promised, comes upon Karela captured by slavers and bound to be sold. Reminding her of the promise she extracted from him not to aid her, he rides on, leaving her.

== Reception ==
Ryan Harvey calls this, Jordan's first Conan novel, an "excellent first venture into the Hyborian Age", as well as "pulpily exciting and one of the few pastiches from the Tor books that I recommend to people who normally avoid non-Howard Conan." He rates it above Conan the Defender, Jordan's second venture, which he considers "a lesser novel".

Don D'Ammassa called the novel "an excellent adventure story" with "an exciting and well-choreographed climax."

Preceded by none	Tor Conan series (publication order)	Succeeded by Conan the Defender
Preceded by Conan the Magnificent	Complete Conan Saga (William Galen Gray chronology)	Succeeded by "The Hall of the Dead"
