= Conan the Magnificent =

Book by Robert Jordan

- Cover of first edition
- Author: Robert Jordan
- Cover artist: Boris Vallejo
- Language: English
- Series: Conan the Barbarian
- Genre: Sword and sorcery
- Publisher: Tor Books
- Publication date: 1984
- Publication place: United States
- Media type: Print (Paperback)
- Pages: 286
- ISBN: 0-8125-4236-3

Conan the Magnificent is a fantasy novel by American writer Robert Jordan, featuring Robert E. Howard's sword and sorcery hero Conan the Barbarian. It was first published in paperback by Tor Books in May 1984, and was reprinted in December 1991; a trade paperback edition followed from the same publisher in 1991. The first British edition was published in paperback by Sphere Books in July 1986 and reprinted in September 1989; a later British edition was published in paperback by Legend Books in February 1997. The novel was later gathered together with Conan the Triumphant and Conan the Destroyer into the hardcover omnibus collection The Conan Chronicles II (Legend, April 1997), and was later gathered together with Conan the Triumphant and Conan the Victorious into the hardcover omnibus collection The Further Chronicles of Conan (Tor Books, October 1999).

== Plot ==
During a prologue, set in the Kezankian Mountains, an evil priest named Basraken Ismalla sacrifices a tribe of hillmen to appease his dragon god. Ismalla is searching for three magical rubies known as the Eyes of Fire. These gems will allow him control over the creature, for use against his enemies.

The scene shifts to Shadizar, Zamora's infamous "City of the Wicked", where a newly-arrived Conan attempts to steal an emerald goblet as pension in repaying a gambling debt. However, his plans are foiled by the interference of Tamira, a female thief. Meanwhile, a noblewoman named Lady Jondra scouts out Conan as a possible paramour, even as Tamira inveigles her way into Jondra's household with the intent of stealing a stash of exotic jewels. Looking to settle scores with the thief, Conon follows Jondra's hunting party out of the city.

Eventually, Conan encounters Jondra, separated from her party and besieged by wolves. He drives off the creatures and gains her favor. He learns how Jondra is hunting the fabled dragon. After besting the lady's huntsman during a spear-throwing contest, Conan is offered a higher estimation by Jondra and given a place at her bedside.

Jondra's expedition soon encounter Eldran, sole survivor of a Brythunian village destroyed by the Dragon, who, armed with a magic sword, is also after the beast. Jondra dismisses his warnings of its ferocity and sends Eldran off. That night, a band of Kezankian raiders attack the camp. Fortunately, Conan rallies the hunters and prevents a massacre from occurring. In the wake of this carnage, General Zanthinides of the Zamoran army arrives, pressing Lady Jondra on returning to Shadizar under his escort. She refuses the general's offer. Afterwards, Zanthindies tries in vain to rape her, but is thwarted by Conan.

Meanwhile, Ismalla is becoming frustrated. Both his hired thieves and warriors have been unsuccessful with their operations. Now, all of his strategies towards obtaining the Eyes of Fire have failed, while his leadership over the Kezankian tribes, who revere the Dragon, is in jeopardy. However, Ismalla manages to protect his position by killing a rival chief and finds personal oversight in his effort to gain possession of the rubies.

Lady Jondra's hunting party finally encounters their quarry, and are soon decimated by the dragon. The survivors quickly scatter. Conan gathers those he can find back together. Tamira and the lady are with him that night when the Kezankians attack their camp again, slaughtering the few hunters left. During the battle, both Conan and Tamira are separated from Jondra.

Conan leaves Tamira behind to search for Jondra alone. While he's gone, Tamira is captured by the hillmen. Upon returning to camp, Conan finds the hillmen have already raided most of the supplies. He gathers the remaining equipment and comes across Jondra's chief huntsmen, driven mad by his battle with the beast.

Meanwhile, it's the lone wanderer, Eldran, who stumbles across Jondra. As petulant as ever, she knocks him unconscious with a well-aimed stone after he professes his love for her. Jondra flees up a narrow pass, only to be captured a few moments later by hillmen.

Having found no sign of Jondra, Conan returns to find Tamira missing. He follows the hillmen's trail and instead stumbles across Eldran, who's already assembled a small unit of armed villagers. He learns of Jondra's peril. They join forces, and together with Eldran's countrymen continue to seek the lady and Tamira.

Both Jondra and Tamira are now in the hands of Basraken Ismalla. Upon learning how the Eyes of Fire he sought were carried by a woman matching Jondra's description, Ismalla orders his men to search through all the recovered supplies from the hunter's camp.

Conan and the Brythunian party soon reach Basraken's encampment. However, after seeing the army Basraken has amassed, Conan sends a runner to find the Zamoran cavalry and hopefully lead then to assist in their planned attack.

Now, having the Eyes of Fire in his possession, Basraken intends to summon the creature and sacrifice his captives.

Seeing the women unharmed, Conan, Eldran, and one of the villagers decide they shouldn't wait for the arrival of Zanthindies. Disguised as hillmen, Conan and his companions sneak down into the camp. Suddenly, an alarm rises during Basraken's ritual. At first, Conan believes he's been discovered only to hear the cry of frighted hillmen. The army has arrived.

As the army attacks and Conan frees both women, the beast, heeding its call, charges into the melee.

== Reception ==
Don D'Ammassa called the novel "[a] nicely told adventure."

Preceded by Conan the Triumphant	Tor Conan series (publication order)	Succeeded by Conan the Destroyer
Preceded by Conan the Outcast	Complete Conan Saga (William Galen Gray chronology)	Succeeded by Conan the Invincible
