= Harriet McDougal =

American writer and editor (born 1939)

Harriet McDougal Rigney
- Born: Harriet Stoney Popham; August 4, 1939 (age 87); Charleston, South Carolina
- Education: Harvard University
- Occupation: Editor
- Spouses: Ed McDougal (m. 1960–1966) Robert Jordan (m. 1981; died 2007)
- Writing career
- Genres: Science fiction and Fantasy
- Notable works: The Wheel of Time, The Black Company, Ender's Game

Harriet Popham McDougal Rigney (born August 4, 1939) is an American editor who worked on several best-selling fantasy and science fiction books and series, including The Wheel of Time (written by her husband Robert Jordan), The Black Company, and Ender's Game.

== Personal life ==
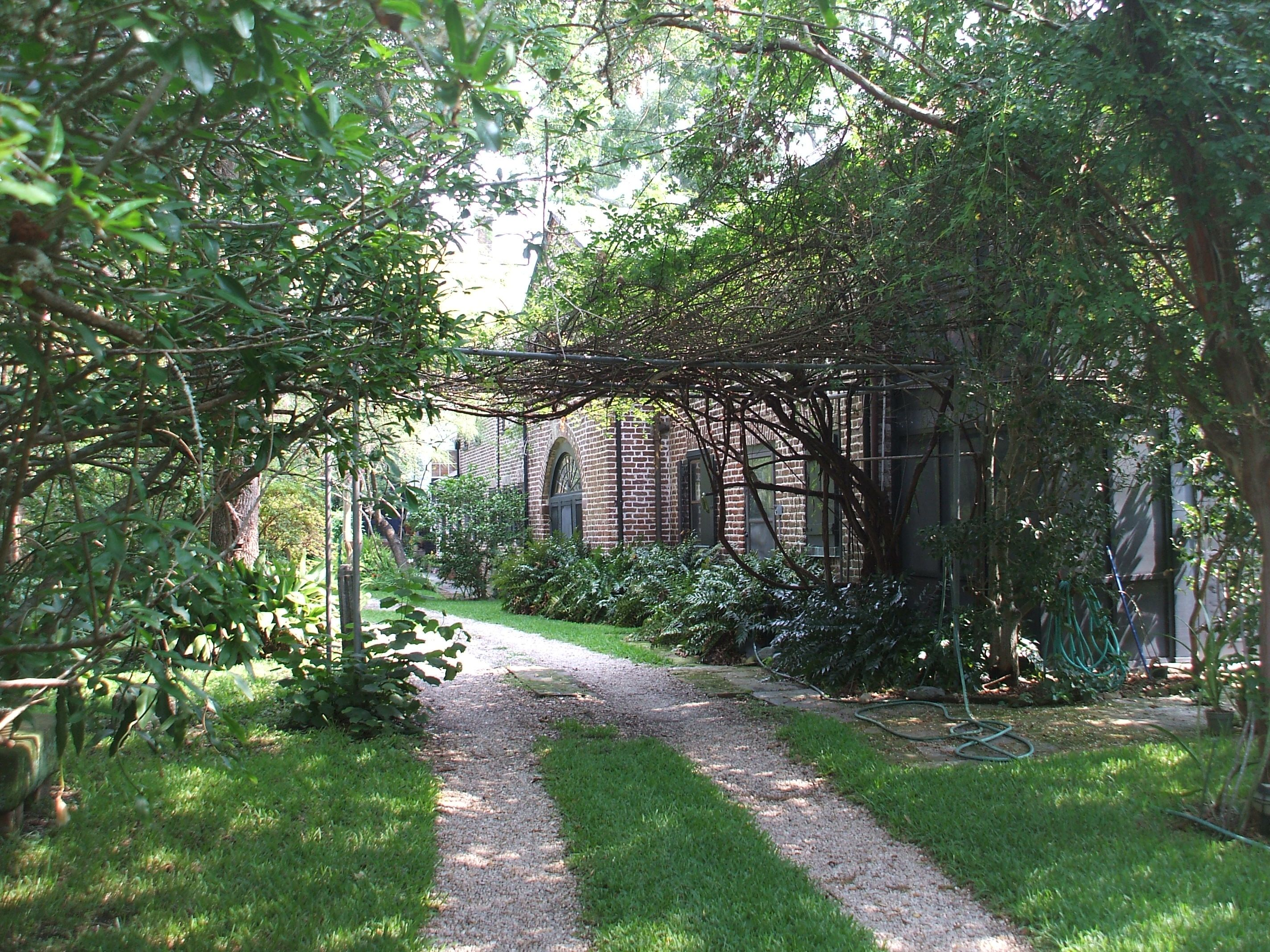
The carriage house

Harriet Stoney Popham was born on August 4, 1939, in Charleston, South Carolina, to Louisa McCord (Stoney) Popham and William Sherbrooke Popham. William S. Popham was a member of the St. Cecilia Society and a rear admiral in the U.S. Navy during World War II; before the war he was stationed for a time with his family in Chapel Hill, North Carolina, to head the NROTC program there.

Harriet's maternal grandmother died the year she was born, and Harriet's mother Louisa soon inherited the family home in downtown Charleston. The house was rented out, while Louisa and her daughter lived in the backyard carriage house. When William was made acting Commandant of the Charleston Naval Shipyard after the war, the family lived at the Yard briefly; but they soon returned to the downtown home, where Harriet spent the rest of her childhood.

Harriet attended Ashley Hall where she was a distinguished member of the French and Latin clubs and president of the student body. She was honored with the Headmistress' Award upon graduation in 1956, given to "that member of the senior class who has made the greatest contribution to the spirit and general welfare of Ashley Hall and best represents the ideal of the school." She entered college at Wellesley as an International Relations student; after a year she transferred to Harvard-Radcliffe, changing her major to English. She graduated in 1960 and returned to Charleston for a year; she became engaged and un-engaged three times before leaving to find work in New York City. There she married her first husband, Ed McDougal, in 1964; she gave birth to her son in 1968 and left her husband two years later.

In 1977, Harriet returned to Charleston when her father died, following her mother's death the preceding year. She met writer James Rigney and published his first book. They married in 1981. He lived with Harriet in the family home, doing his writing in the carriage house, until his death in 2007.

In Charleston, Harriet participates in local societies and charitable causes. She has served on the Board of Trustees for Ashley Hall, and to this day she meets with a group of schoolmates who call themselves the "First Graders", as they all began first grade together in Charleston.

== Career ==
When McDougal finished college in 1960, she worked for a year as the assistant archivist at the South Carolina Historical Society, making $42.50 a week. There she met a man who gave her a reference letter for John Wiley & Sons, where she began her editing career. After seven years at John Wiley & Sons, she moved to Harcourt Brace where she worked on the first science fiction and fantasy textbook ever published, and then to World Publishing to run the copyeditors for the children's books department. After a brief period of freelancing, she landed a job at Grosset & Dunlap.

By the early 1970s, McDougal had established herself as Tom Doherty's top editor under the Tempo imprint at Grosset & Dunlap. While at Tempo, McDougal edited several science fiction and fantasy books, and she also edited comic strip collections; among other things, she negotiated Tempo's acquisition of the rights for Hägar the Horrible. Doherty's and McDougal's success with Tempo eventually led to the 1976 purchase of Charter Communications and its science fiction imprint Ace Books, by Grosset & Dunlap. When McDougal was editorial director for Ace, Doherty hired Jim Baen to work under her, and when Doherty left Ace to start Tor Books in 1980, Baen followed, working at Tor for a few years before starting his own imprint, Baen Books.

McDougal's father died in 1977, just over a year after the death of her mother. Despite a promotion at Ace to vice president, she decided to resign and return to Charleston to raise her son and assume responsibility for the family home. Through a profit-sharing agreement with Dick Gallen, who had been general counsel for Dell Publishing, she established her own imprint, Popham Press; Gallen was also an early financier of Tor Books, and McDougal also continued to edit for Doherty from Charleston. She met Robert Jordan through a local bookstore, where she learned from the owner that Jordan had sold his first novel, Warriors of the Altaii, to Jim Baen, and that when Baen had left Ace for Tor, Susan Allison had taken over for him at Ace and had reverted the rights for the book to Jordan, leaving him unpublished. McDougal left her contact information for Jordan on an index card.

Jordan contacted McDougal, and she read Warriors of the Altaii. It wasn't what she was interested in, so Jordan pitched a historical fiction series instead, which Jordan originally envisioned as a bodice-ripper. Eventually she edited and published The Fallon Blood, written by Jordan as Reagan O'Neal, for Popham Press in 1980; when they finished touring for the book, they began dating, and soon they became engaged. At that time, Jordan published Cheyenne Raiders (as Jackson O'Reilly) through another editor, "because I thought, 'Hang on...I just asked a woman to marry me, and she is my source of income!' So I very hurriedly sold the book somewhere else so she would not be my sole source of income." However, McDougal edited all of his other books, which were published by the Tor imprint. They married on March 28, 1981, and Jordan began writing the Wheel of Time in 1984. After their marriage, she kept McDougal as her professional name, and she continued to edit for Tor, working on projects such as Orson Scott Card's Ender's Game and The Black Company series by Glen Cook.

== Wheel of Time ==
McDougal edited Robert Jordan's books until his death in 2007, though her role lessened as the years went on. In her words: "By the last of the Wheel of Time books, my role was primarily that of wife: keeping him fed and cared for—because after 20 plus years I had taught him everything I knew about storytelling and prose, and he had really become the wonderful writer that he was." She eventually stopped picking up new authors, going into semi-retirement and limiting her work to her husband's books.

When Jordan was diagnosed with amyloidosis in late 2005, her role began to change; fans of the Wheel of Time books began to depend on McDougal and Jordan's cousin Wilson Grooms for updates about both his condition and the status of the final book of the series. Jordan had always insisted that, in the event of his premature death, his notes would be destroyed, and no one would be allowed to finish The Wheel of Time. But around the time of his diagnosis (before the news was made public), he began to reassure his fans, saying "My comments about arrangements in case of my death (burning the notes, doing triple Guttman wipes on the hard drives, etc.) were mainly a defense against any fans who became so frantic to see the end that they thought knocking me off might result in somebody else finishing the books faster."

Jordan continued to insist until weeks before his death that he would live to finish the story, but when he realized he would not, he asked his wife to find someone to finish what he had begun. She chose up-and-coming author Brandon Sanderson for the task.

I had not heard of Brandon until ... it was the week of my husband's death. A friend was visiting. She put in front of me a print-out, and it was the eulogy for Robert Jordan that Brandon had posted on his web site. Brandon's eulogy was really beautiful, and very loving. And I thought, gosh, this guy. . . he knows what the series is all about. And I got on the phone, called Tom Doherty and said, "Send me one of Sanderson's books." And he's a bit darker than Robert Jordan, but the series, as everyone knows, is heading towards Tarmon Gai'don, which is the battle with the Dark One that will decide the fate of the world. Tom said, "Okay, I'll go for that. We'll go for Brandon."

— Harriet McDougal

Following Jordan's death, McDougal became the owner of the Wheel of Time copyright, the highest authority for decisions concerning its future, and the surrogate 'mother' of the series in the eyes of fans. She continued to play a highly active role in the fandom, attending many conventions and book signings with Sanderson, and edited Sanderson's work on the series along with Jordan's long-time assistants, Maria Livingston Simons and Alan Romanczuk. An encyclopedia for the series had been in the works for many years and, with the contract signed prior to Jordan's death, McDougal continued working with Team Jordan on the project. The encyclopedia, titled The Wheel of Time Companion, was published in 2015. She has also contributed to the editing of The Way of Kings, the first book in Sanderson's The Stormlight Archive series, which was published in 2010. In 2019, it was confirmed that McDougal and Sanderson would both serve as consulting producers on The Wheel Of Time television adaptation.
