= The Further Chronicles of Conan =

1999 collection of fantasy novels written by Robert Jordan

- Dust-jacket from the first edition
- Author: Robert Jordan
- Cover artist: Gary Ruddell
- Language: English
- Series: Tor Conan Chronicles
- Genre: Fantasy novels
- Publisher: Tor Books
- Publication date: 1999
- Publication place: United States
- Media type: Print (hardback)
- Pages: 509 pp
- ISBN: 0-312-87195-3
- OCLC: 42427381
- Dewey Decimal: 813/.54 21
- LC Class: PS3560.O7617 A6 1999
- Preceded by: The Conan Chronicles
- Followed by: Sagas of Conan

The Further Chronicles of Conan is a collection of fantasy novels written by Robert Jordan featuring the sword and sorcery hero Conan the Barbarian, created by Robert E. Howard. The book was first published in hardcover in October 1999 by Tor Books, with a trade paperback edition following in September 2004 from the same publisher. It collects three novels previously published by Tor.

== Contents ==
- Conan the Magnificent
- Conan the Triumphant
- Conan the Victorious

== Reception ==
Reviewer Bob Byrne writes that "it seems to be generally agreed that Jordan's works are among the best of the non-Howard efforts (of course, some will disagree)." In his own reading of the collection, "this Conan is not the comedian-ish version portrayed by Ah-nuld S. in the two movies, and "a bit more of the noble savage and less of the wild barbarian than I expected." He finds Jordan's writing "nicely descriptive without being quite as wordy as he grew to be in the latter half of the Wheel of Time series."
