= James Frenkel =

American editor and literary agent

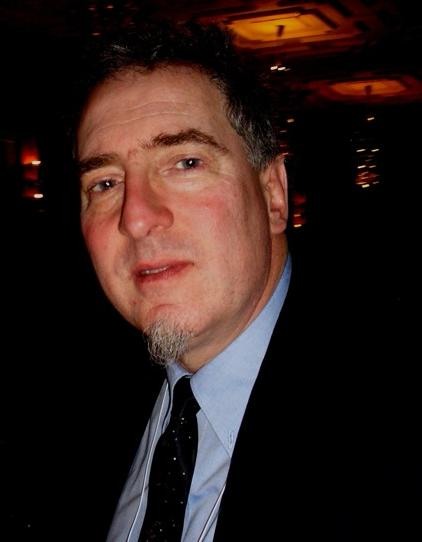
- Frenkel in 2005
- Born: James Raymond Frenkel; 1948 (age 77–78); Queens, New York, United States
- Occupations: Editor, literary agent
- Spouse: Joan D. Vinge (m. 1980)

James Raymond Frenkel (born 1948) is an American editor and agent of science fiction, fantasy, mysteries, thrillers, historical fiction, and other books, formerly for Tom Doherty Associates (Tor Books and Forge Books). He has edited numerous prominent authors such as Vernor Vinge, Joan D. Vinge, Frederik Pohl, Andre Norton, Loren D. Estleman, Dan Simmons, Jack Williamson, Timothy Zahn, Marie Jakober and Greg Bear. His agency clients include John C. Wright and L. Jagi Lamplighter. He and his wife, author Joan D. Vinge lived in Madison, Wisconsin for many years, but have moved to Chapel Hill, North Carolina.

In 1968, Frenkel founded The Science Fiction Forum at the State University of New York at Stony Brook, a student-run organization which continues to operate a large lending library of science fiction, fantasy, and horror books. He was the publisher of Bluejay Books, an independent trade publisher of the mid-1980s. Bluejay Books published Gardner Dozois's The Year's Best Science Fiction for three years. He also was the packager of The Year's Best Fantasy and Horror series edited by Ellen Datlow and Terri Windling (for sixteen years) and then Ellen Datlow and Kelly Link & Gavin J. Grant (for five years).

In July 2013, Frenkel left Tor after two complaints about sexual harassment at WisCon, a feminist science fiction convention where he had been a regular attendee and presenter, and (in 1994) a Guest of Honor. Frenkel was subsequently permanently banned from attending the convention, with science fiction editor Michi Trota describing Frenkel as "someone who has been an industry missing stair for decades." However, in 2017, he was on the convention committee of Odyssey Con, a different science fiction convention also held in Madison, and scheduled as a presenter, prompting several authors (one of whom claimed to have had unpleasant experiences with Frenkel in the past) to withdraw from the convention.
