= The Wheel of Time Companion =

Reference book for The Wheel of Time novels by Robert Jordan

- Author: Harriet McDougal, Alan Romanczuk, and Maria Simons
- Language: English
- Series: The Wheel of Time
- Genre: Fantasy
- Publisher: Tor Books
- Publication date: 3 November 2015
- Publication place: United States
- Media type: Print (hardback and paperback), e-book
- Pages: 816 (hardcover)
- ISBN: 978-0765314611
- Preceded by: The World of Robert Jordan's The Wheel of Time

The Wheel of Time Companion (subtitled: The People, Places, and History of the Bestselling Series) is a reference book for The Wheel of Time epic fantasy series of novels by Robert Jordan. The book was released by Tor Books in hardback format on 3 November 2015. It was co-written by Harriet McDougal (Jordan's wife), Alan Romanczuk, and Maria Simons (Jordan's editorial assistants).

== Description ==
The companion examines in detail the universe created by Jordan, which is set in an unnamed world. It aims to be a glossary of his entire series and includes biographies of both major and minor characters, alongside their motivations. The single-volume presents detail in an A-to-Z format and includes:

- An entry for each named character
- Histories and customs of the nations of the world
- Descriptions of the flora and fauna unique to the world
- A dictionary of the Old Tongue
- New maps of the Last Battle
- New portraits of many of the main characters
- The strength level of many channelers

According to McDougal in the book's introduction:

[The Wheel of Time Companion] is an alphabetized adjunct that will allow the reader to check on characters, locations, herbs, kinship structures, and many other things that appear in the series … We hope that this Companion will be useful for those reading or rereading the series, or those just wishing to refresh themselves about some aspect of the series.

The book was the second attempt to describe Jordan's universe after The World of Robert Jordan's The Wheel of Time, which was released in November 1997. Jordan, who assisted as editor, called that book broadly canonical but stated that it was written from the perspective of a historian within The Wheel of Time universe and was therefore prone to errors of bias and guesswork.

== Publication history ==
The 350,000-word and 816-page long original text (ISBN 978-0765314611) was released by Tor Books in hardback format on 3 November 2015. A paperback version of the book (ISBN 978-0765314628) was later released by Tor Books on 30 May 2017.

== Reception ==
The book was generally well-received for its extensive treatment of its content. According to one reviewer:

The book supplants The World of Robert Jordan's Wheel of Time, another companion-like reference book published in 1997 that was, until now, the last word on filling in the Wheel's backstory through appendices. The Companion delves into characters, locations, items, languages, history, and events with commendable dedication, with particular praise aimed at a multi-page written and visual breakdown of the logistics of the Last Battle from A Memory of Light. The book is structured like a dictionary, using alphabetical entries that make it a much lengthier version of the glossaries found at the ends of other Wheel of Time books.
