= Ace Books =

American specialty publisher of science fiction and fantasy books

- Parent company: Berkley Books (Penguin Random House)
- Founded: 1952; 74 years ago
- Founder: A. A. Wyn
- Country of origin: United States
- Headquarters location: New York City
- Key people: Ginjer Buchanan, Editor in Chief
- Publication types: Books
- Fiction genres: Science fiction
- Official website: www.penguin.com

Ace Books is a publisher of science fiction (SF) and fantasy books founded in New York City in 1952 by Aaron A. Wyn. It began as a genre publisher of mysteries and westerns, and soon branched out into other genres, publishing its first science fiction title in 1953. This was successful, and science fiction titles outnumbered both mysteries and westerns within a few years. Other genres also made an appearance, including nonfiction, gothic novels, media tie-in novelizations, and romances. Ace became known for the tête-bêche binding format used for many of its early books, although it did not originate the format. Most of the early titles were published in this "Ace Double" format, and Ace continued to issue books in varied genres, bound tête-bêche, until 1973.

Ace, along with Ballantine Books, was one of the leading science fiction publishers for its first ten years of operation. The death of owner A. A. Wyn in 1967 set the stage for a later decline in the publisher's fortunes. Two leading editors, Donald A. Wollheim and Terry Carr, left in 1971, and in 1972 Ace was sold to Grosset & Dunlap. Despite financial troubles, there were further successes, particularly with the third Ace Science Fiction Specials series, for which Carr came back as editor. Further mergers and acquisitions resulted in the company becoming absorbed by Berkley Books. Ace later became an imprint of Penguin Group (USA).

== History ==
=== 1952: Ace Doubles concept ===
Ace Double D-36, Robert E. Howard's Conan the Conqueror. The novel on the reverse side was Leigh Brackett's The Sword of Rhiannon. Cover by Norman Saunders.

Editor Donald A. Wollheim was working at Avon Books in 1952, but disliked his job. While looking for other work, he tried to persuade A. A. Wyn to begin a new paperback publishing company. Wyn was already a well-established publisher of books and pulp magazines under the name A. A. Wyn's Magazine Publishers. His magazines included Ace Mystery and Ace Sports, and it is perhaps from these titles that Ace Books got its name. Wyn liked Wollheim's idea but delayed for several months; meanwhile, Wollheim was applying for other jobs, including assistant editor at Pyramid Books. Pyramid mistakenly called Wyn's wife Rose for a reference, thinking Wollheim had worked for her. When Rose told her husband that Wollheim was applying for another job, Wyn made up his mind: he hired Wollheim immediately as an editor.

The first book published by Ace was a pair of mysteries bound tête-bêche: Keith Vining's Too Hot for Hell, backed with Samuel W. Taylor's The Grinning Gismo, priced at 35 cents, with serial number D-01. A tête-bêche book has the two titles bound upside-down with respect to each other, so that there are two front covers and the two texts meet in the middle. This format is generally regarded as an innovation of Ace's; it was not, but Ace published hundreds of titles bound this way over the next twenty-one years. Books by established authors were often bound with those by lesser-known writers. Ace was "notorious for cutting text", in the words of bibliographer James Corrick: even some novels labeled "Complete and Unabridged" were cut. Isaac Asimov's The Stars Like Dust was one such: it was reprinted by Ace under the title The Rebellious Stars, and cuts were made without Asimov's approval. Similarly John Brunner repudiated the text of his novel Castaway's World because of unauthorized cuts to the text.

Some important titles in the early D-series novels are D-15, which features William S. Burroughs's first novel, Junkie (written under the pseudonym "William Lee"), and many novels by Philip K. Dick, Robert Bloch, Harlan Ellison, Harry Whittington, and Louis L'Amour, including those written under his pseudonym "Jim Mayo".

The last Ace Double in the first series was John T. Phillifent's Life with Lancelot, backed with William Barton's Hunting on Kunderer, issued August 1973 (serial #48245). Although Ace resumed using the "Ace Double" name in 1974, the books were arranged conventionally rather than tête-bêche.

=== 1953–1963: Genre specialization ===
Ace's second title was a western (also tête-bêche): William Colt MacDonald's Bad Man's Return, bound with J. Edward Leithead's Bloody Hoofs. Mysteries and westerns alternated regularly for the first thirty titles, with a few books not in either genre, such as P. G. Wodehouse's Quick Service, bound with his The Code of the Woosters. In 1953, A. E. van Vogt's The World of Null-A, bound with his The Universe Maker, appeared; this was Ace's first foray into science fiction. (Earlier in 1953, Ace had released Theodore S. Drachman's Cry Plague!, with a plot that could be regarded as science fiction, but the book it was bound with—Leslie Edgley's The Judas Goat—is a mystery.) Another science fiction double followed later in 1953, and science fiction rapidly established itself, alongside westerns and mysteries, as an important part of Ace's business. By 1955, the company released more science fiction titles each year than in either of the other two genres, and from 1961 onward, science fiction titles outnumbered mysteries and westerns combined. Ace also published a number of lurid juvenile delinquent novels in the 1950s that are now very collectible, such as D-343, The Young Wolves by Edward De Roo and D-378, Out for Kicks by Wilene Shaw.

With Ballantine Books, Ace was the dominant American science fiction paperback publisher in the 1950s and 1960s. Other publishers followed their lead, catering to the increasing audience for science fiction, but none matched the influence of either company. Ace published, during this period, early work by Philip K. Dick, Gordon R. Dickson, Samuel R. Delany, Ursula K. Le Guin, and Roger Zelazny.

=== 1964–1970: Financial struggles ===
Joanna Russ's And Chaos Died (1970), from the first Ace Science Fiction Special series. Cover by Leo and Diane Dillon.

In 1964, science fiction author Terry Carr joined the company, and in 1967, he initiated the Ace Science Fiction Specials line, which published critically acclaimed original novels by such authors as R. A. Lafferty, Joanna Russ and Ursula K. Le Guin. Carr and Wollheim also co-edited an annual Year's Best Science Fiction anthology series; and Carr also edited Universe, a well-received original anthology series. Universe was initially published by Ace, although when Carr left in 1971 the series moved elsewhere.

In 1965, Ace published an unauthorized American paperback edition of The Lord of the Rings by J. R. R. Tolkien, believing that the copyright had expired in the U.S. Tolkien had not wanted to publish a paperback edition, but changed his mind after the Ace edition appeared, and an authorized paperback edition was subsequently published by Ballantine Books, which included on the back cover of the paperbacks a message urging readers not to buy the unauthorized edition. Ace agreed to pay royalties to Tolkien and let its still-popular edition go out of print.

Wyn died in 1967, and the company grew financially overextended, failing to pay its authors reliably. Without money to pay the signing bonus, Wollheim was unwilling to send signed contracts to authors. On at least one occasion, a book without a valid contract went to the printer, and Wollheim later found out that the author, who was owed $3,000 by Ace, was reduced to picking fruit for a living.

=== 1971–2015: Ace becomes a subsidiary ===
Both Wollheim and Carr left Ace in 1971. Wollheim had made plans to launch a separate paperback house, and in cooperation with New American Library, he proceeded to set up DAW Books. Carr became a freelance editor; both Carr and Wollheim went on to edit competing Year's Best Science Fiction anthology series.

In 1969 Ace Books was acquired by Charter Communications in New York City. In 1977 Charter Communications was acquired by Grosset & Dunlap, and in 1982, Grosset & Dunlap was in turn acquired by G. P. Putnam's Sons. Ace was reputedly the only profitable element of the Grosset & Dunlap empire by this time. Ace soon became the science fiction imprint of its parent company.

Carr returned to Ace Books in 1984 as a freelance editor, launching a new series of Ace Specials devoted entirely to first novels. This series was even more successful than the first: it included, in 1984 alone, William Gibson's Neuromancer, Kim Stanley Robinson's The Wild Shore, Lucius Shepard's Green Eyes, and Michael Swanwick's In the Drift. All were first novels by authors now regarded as major figures in the genre. Other prominent science fiction publishing figures who have worked at Ace include Tom Doherty, who left to start Tor Books, and Jim Baen, who left to work at Tor and who eventually founded Baen Books. Writers who have worked at Ace include Frederik Pohl and Ellen Kushner.

In 1996, Penguin Group (USA) acquired the Putnam Berkley Group, and has retained Ace as its science fiction imprint. As of December 2012, recently published authors included Joe Haldeman, Charles Stross, Laurell K. Hamilton, Alastair Reynolds, and Jack McDevitt. Penguin merged with Random House in 2013 to form Penguin Random House, which continues to own Berkley. Ace's editorial team is also responsible for the Roc Books imprint, although the two imprints maintain a separate identity.

== People ==
The following people have worked at Ace Books in various editorial roles. The list is sorted in order of the date they started working at Ace, where known. It includes editors who are notable for some reason, as well as the most recent editors at the imprint.

- A. A. Wyn, owner (1952–1967)
- Donald A. Wollheim, editor (1952–1971)
- Terry Carr, editor (1964–1971); freelance editor (1983–1987)
- Pat LoBrutto, mail room (1969–1972); science fiction editor (1974–1977)
- Frederik Pohl, executive editor (December 1971 – July 1972)
- Tom Doherty, publisher (1975–1980)
- Jim Baen, complaints department (c. 1973–1974); gothics editor (c. 1974); science fiction editor (c. 1977–1980)
- Ellen Kushner
- Terri Windling, editor (1979–1987)
- Harriet McDougal, editorial director
- Susan Allison, editor (1980–1982); editor-in-chief (1982–2006); vice president (1985 – July 2015)
- Beth Meacham, editorial assistant (1981–1982); editor (1982–1983)
- Ginjer Buchanan, editor (1984–1987); senior editor (1987–1994); executive editor, science fiction and fantasy (1994 – January 1996); senior executive editor and marketing director (January 1996 – 2006); editor-in-chief (2006–2014).
- Peter Heck (c. 1991–1992)
- Laura Anne Gilman (c. 1991)
- Lou Stathis, editor (? – c. 1994)
- Anne Sowards, editorial assistant/associate editor (1996–2003); editor (2003 – February 2007), senior editor (from February 2007), executive editor (by September 2010)

== Ace nomenclature ==
Until the late 1980s, Ace titles had two main types of serial numbers: letter series, such as "D-31" and "H-77", and numeric, such as "10293" and "15697". The letters were used to indicate a price. The following is a list of letter series with their date ranges and prices.

- D-series: 35¢, 1952 to 1962.
- S-series: 25¢, 1952 to 1956.
- T-series: 40¢. This series is listed in Tuck's Encyclopedia, but he gives no examples in his index and there are none cited in other bibliographic sources. This series may, therefore, not exist.
- F-series: 40¢, 1961 to 1967.
- M-series: 45¢, 1964 to 1967.
- G-series: 50¢, 1958 to 1960 (D/S/G series); 1964 to 1968 (later series).
- K-series: various prices, 1959 to 1966.
- H-series: 60¢, 1966 to 1968.
- A-series: 75¢, 1963 to 1968.
- N-series: 95¢, 1968.

The first series of Ace books began in 1952 with D-01, a western in tête-bêche format: Keith Vining's Too Hot for Hell backed with Samuel W. Taylor's The Grinning Gismo. That series continued until D-599, Patricia Libby's Winged Victory for Nurse Kerry, but the series also included several G and S serial numbers, depending on the price. The D and S did not indicate "Double" (i.e., tête-bêche) or "Single"; there are D-series titles that are not tête-bêche, although none of the tête-bêche titles have an S serial number. Towards the end of this initial series, the F series began (at a new price), and thereafter there were always several different letter series in publication simultaneously. The D and S prefixes did not appear again after the first series, but the G prefix acquired its own series starting with G-501. Hence the eight earlier G-series titles can be considered part of a different series to the G-series proper. All later series after the first kept independent numbering systems, starting at 1 or 101. The tête-bêche format proved attractive to book collectors, and some rare titles in mint condition command prices over $1,000.

Ace added a line of "singles" and the Ace Star series for larger and more expensive books (especially non-fiction).

== Sources ==
- Asimov, Isaac (1980). In Joy Still Felt (Book Club ed.). New York: Doubleday. ISBN 0-936071-13-3.
- Canja, Jeff (2002). Collectable Paperback Books (2nd ed.). East Lansing, Michigan: Glenmoor Publishing. ISBN 0-9673639-5-0.
- Corrick, James A. (1989). Double Your Pleasure: The Ace SF Double. Brooklyn, New York: Gryphon Books. ISBN 0-936071-13-3.
- Dzwonkoski, David (1986). "Ace Books". In Dzwonkoski, Peter (ed.). American Literary Publishing Houses, 1900-1980: Trade and Paperback. Detroit, Michigan: Gale Research Company. pp. 5–8. ISBN 0-8103-1724-9.
- Edwards, Malcolm; Nicholls, Peter (1993). "Publishing". In Clute, John; Nicholls, Peter (eds.). The Encyclopedia of Science Fiction. New York: St. Martin's Press. pp. 976–978. ISBN 0-312-09618-6.
- Jaffery, Sheldon (1987). Double Trouble: A Bibliographic Chronicle of Ace Mystery Doubles., Starmont Popular Culture Series #11. Borgo Press. ISBN 1-55742-118-8.
- Jaffery, Sheldon (1999). Double Futures: An Annotated Bibliography of the Ace Science Fiction Doubles. Borgo Press. ISBN 1-55742-139-0.
- Kelley, George (1982). "Ace Books". In Cnider, Allen Billy (ed.). Mass Market Publishing in America. Boston: G.K. Hall & Co. pp. 1–14. ISBN 0-8161-8590-5.
- Knight, Damon (1977). The Futurians. New York: John Day.
- Nielsen, Leon (2007). Robert E. Howard: A Collector's Descriptive Bibliography of American and British Hardcover, Paperback, Magazine, Special and Amateur Editions, with a Biography. Jefferson, North Carolina: McFarland & Company. ISBN 978-0-7864-6109-7.
- Peters, Harold R. (1996). Science Fiction, Fantasy & Horror in the Ace Letter-Series Editions: A Collector's Notebook. Silver Sun Press.
- Thiessen, J. Grant (1976). Science Fiction Collector #1. Pandora's Books. Includes checklist of all Ace singles and doubles in the science fiction, fantasy, and horror fields.
- Thiessen, J. Grant (date unknown). Science Fiction Collector #2. Pandora's Books. Includes errata for checklist in #1.
- Tolkien, J. R. R. (1981). "Letters #270, #272, #273.". In Carpenter, Humphrey (ed.). Letters of J. R. R. Tolkien. Boston: Houghton Mifflin. ISBN 978-0-395-31555-2.
- Tuck, Donald H. (1978). The Encyclopedia of Science Fiction and Fantasy Through 1968. Vol. 2: Who's Who, M-Z. Chicago: Advent Publishers. ISBN 0-911682-22-8.
- Wollheim, Donald A. (1989). "Introduction". In Corrick, James A. (ed.). Double Your Pleasure: The Ace SF Doubles. Brooklyn, New York: Gryphon Books. p. 5. ISBN 0-936071-13-3.
