= J. Grant Thiessen =

Canadian bibliographer and bookseller (born 1947)

J. Grant Thiessen (born in 1947 in Winnipeg, Manitoba) is a Canadian bibliographer and bookseller working primarily in the area of science fiction.

Thiessen's bibliographic fanzine, The Science Fiction Collector, has been collected into three hardbound volumes by Pandora's Books. The most frequently referenced work from these volumes is the guide to Ace Books' science fiction doubles: books bound dos-à-dos. Other paperback publishers whose output is documented by Thiessen includes Ballantine Books, Monarch Books, Curtis Books, and Lancer Books. The volumes also contain biographies of individual authors including James H. Schmitz, Jack Williamson, E. C. Tubb, A. E. van Vogt, and Charles L. Harness.

Thiessen has also published The Tanelorn Archives, a bibliography of Michael Moorcock, and has made many contributions to bibliographic reference works, magazines, and price guides, as well as producing several hundred book catalogs.

He acquired his CMA (Certified Management Accountant) degree in 1973. In 1977, he formally incorporated as Pandora's Books Ltd. In 1995, Pandora's Books began Internet retail operations. The company was sold in 1999, and operated until 2020 under new management.

Grant continued to sell books and write computer software, as BookIT Enterprises Inc, until his retirement in early 2022.
