= Missing stair =

Metaphor for a person within a social group

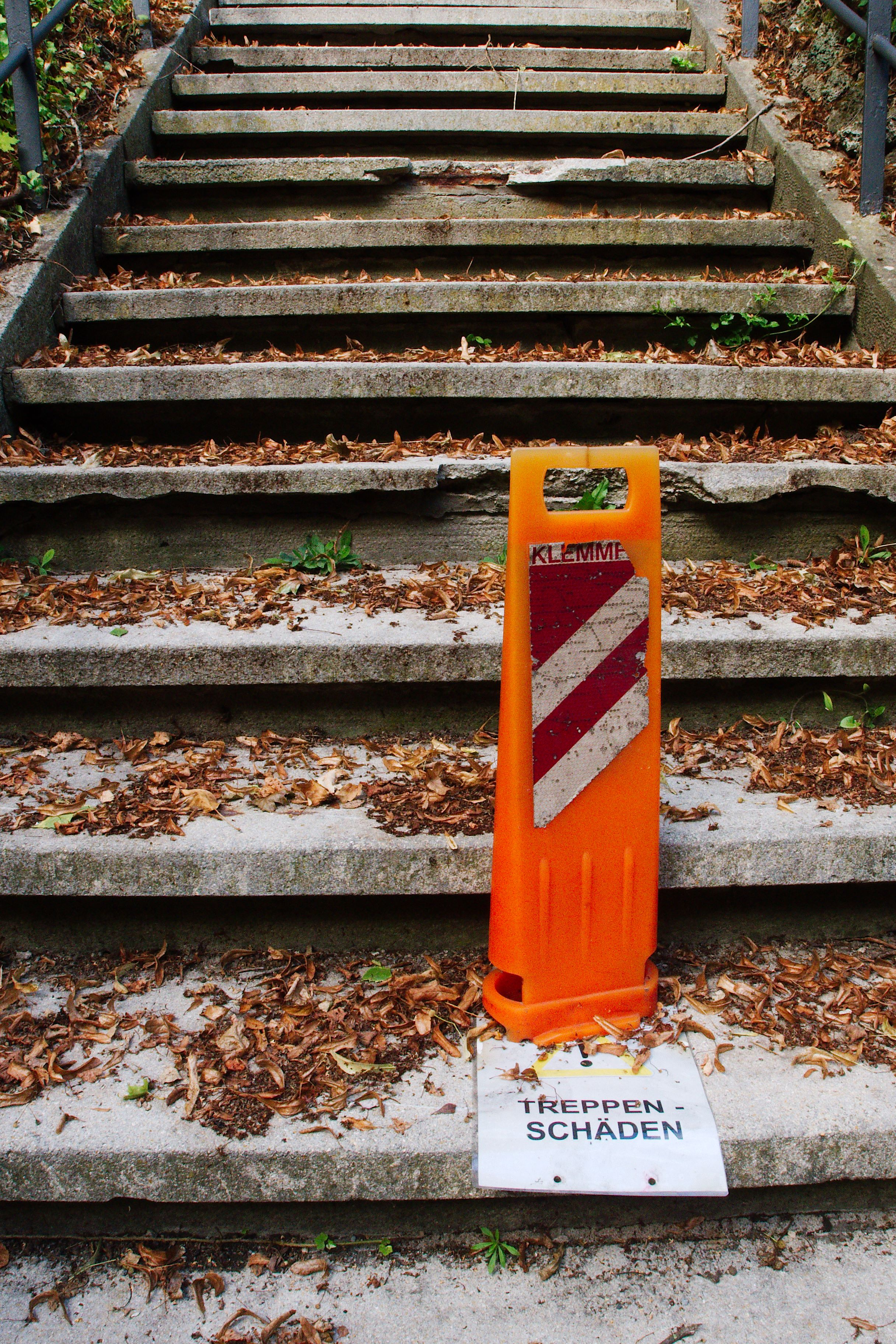
A staircase with two broken stairs and a warning sign, where the structural problem has not yet been fixed

The missing stair is a metaphor for a person within a social group or organization who many people know is untrustworthy or otherwise has to be "managed", but around whom the group chooses to work by discreetly warning newcomers of their behavior, rather than address the person and their behavior openly. The "missing stair" in the metaphor refers to a dangerous structural fault, such as a missing step in a staircase; a fault that people may become used to and quietly accepting of, that is not openly signposted or fixed, and that newcomers to a group or organization are warned about discreetly.

== Origins ==
The phrase was coined by blogger Cliff Jerrison in a 2012 post on The Pervocracy, a blog about BDSM and kink. Describing a man in his social circle known to be a rapist, Pervocracy wrote:

People had gotten so used to working around this guy, to accommodating his "special requirements," that they didn't feel like there was an urgent problem in their community. They did eventually expel him, but it was after months of it being widely shared knowledge that he was a rapist. [...] I think there were some people in the community who were intentionally protecting him, but there were more who were de facto protecting him by treating him like a missing stair. Like something you're so used to working around, you never stop to ask "what if we actually fixed this?" Eventually you take it for granted that working around this guy is just a fact of life, and if he hurts someone, that's the fault of whoever didn't apply the workarounds correctly.

Jerrison intended the term to apply beyond sexually predatory behavior, including, for example, underperforming colleagues who let others pick up their slack. While "missing stair" has most often been used in the context of sexual misconduct, it may describe a variety of uncomfortable social or professional circumstances.

== Meaning ==
The analogy of the missing stair makes it clear that the problem is the predator (the missing stair) and that the solution is stopping the predatory behavior (fixing the stair).

An article about industry sexual harassment on comics news site ComicsAlliance posed the question: "Which one of these statements makes more sense to say: 'These people need to find more ways to stop people from harming them.' OR: 'These people should stop causing harm.' If you ever find yourself saying the former instead of the latter, take a moment and ask yourself why."

In a 2014 post on the anti-rape blog Yes Means Yes, lawyer Thomas MacAulay Millar wrote that the missing stair analogy was consistent with his understanding of rapists' motivations and behaviors, based on research carried out by clinical psychologists David Lisak and Paul M. Miller, and by Stephanie K. McWhorter, a researcher with the U.S. Naval Health Research Center. Millar wrote that while a small number of rapists are "one-timers" who may be making a mistake or are confused about consent, the majority are repeat offenders, averaging six rapes each. "We need to spot the rapists," Millar wrote, "and we need to shut down the social structures that give them a license to operate. They don't accidentally end up in a room with a woman too drunk or high to consent or resist; they plan on getting there and that's where they end up."

== Usage ==
The analogy has been picked up and used in communities related to paganism, comics, punk, geek culture, and in Tavi Gevinson's Rookie, a magazine for teenage girls. It has been used by advice columnists, including Captain Awkward and Sam W. at Scarleteen.

Geek culture site The Mary Sue referenced the concept in 2013, in a story celebrating science fiction writer John Scalzi's announcement that he would no longer attend science fiction conventions that did not have clear and prominent sexual harassment policies. In 2014, Feministe quoted science fiction editor Michi Trota describing James Frenkel, who was permanently banned from attending Wiscon after harassment complaints, as "someone who has been an industry missing stair for decades."

In 2014, Yes Means Yes compared disgraced former broadcaster and pop musician Jian Ghomeshi to a missing stair, and urged the BDSM community to distance themselves from him.

In 2015, the missing stair concept was invoked by The Guardian in its coverage of American astronomer Geoffrey Marcy's resignation from his professorship at UC Berkeley, following its finding that he had repeatedly violated the university's sexual harassment policy between 2001 and 2010.

In 2015, after pornographic film actress Stoya accused her colleague and former boyfriend James Deen of rape, prompting similar allegations by a dozen other women, feminist site We Hunted the Mammoth wrote that James Deen seemed to be "a perfect example" of a missing stair.

On NPR, in a review of the 2015 Jo Walton science fiction/fantasy novel The Just City, reviewer Amal El-Mohtar argued that Walton deliberately included missing stairs in her book, in an effort to reflect current discourse around the topic.

In 2017, adult performer Jessica Drake gave an interview to Rolling Stone, and commented regarding the allegations surrounding colleague and fellow performer Ron Jeremy: "I have viewed [Ron Jeremy] as the missing stair in the adult community."

== See also ==
- Bus factor
- Open secret
