= The Science Fiction Forum =

The Science Fiction Forum, founded in 1968 by James Frenkel, is a student club at Stony Brook University.

The club maintains a large lending library of science fiction, fact, fantasy and horror with over 22,000 volumes.

Since 1983, the Science Fiction Forum has produced "Destinies-The Voice of Science Fiction," a weekly radio show airing on Fridays at 11:30 PM on WUSB, 90.1FM.

As of the spring semester of 2021, the Science Fiction Forum (often abbreviated SF4M) is located in the basement level of the newly renovated Student Union. The forum is opened in person for fall 2021.

Membership is officially obtained through registration with the currently appointed secretary, or by simply walking through the main lounge doors twice of the applicant's own free will, whichever comes first.
