= Locus Award for Best Publisher =

The Locus Award for Best Publisher is one of the annual Locus Awards presented by the science fiction and fantasy magazine Locus. Awards presented in a given year are for works published in the previous calendar year. The award for Best Publisher was first given out in 1972.

== Winners ==
Award winners
Year	Publisher	Ref.
1972	Ballantine Books	
1973	Ballantine Books	
1974	Ballantine Books	
1975	Science Fiction Book Club (hardback), Ballantine Books (paperback)	
1976	Science Fiction Book Club (hardback), Ballantine Books (paperback)	
1977	Ballantine Books, Del Rey Books	
1978	Ballantine Books, Del Rey Books	
1979	Ballantine Books, Del Rey Books	
1980	No award made	
1981	Ballantine Books, Del Rey Books	
1982	Pocket Books/Timescape Books	
1983	Pocket Books/Timescape Books	
1984	Ballantine Books, Del Rey Books	
1985	Ballantine Books, Del Rey Books	
1986	Ballantine Books, Del Rey Books	
1987	Ballantine Books, Del Rey Books	
1988	Tor Books	
1989	Tor Books/St. Martin's Press	
1990	Tor Books/St. Martin's Press	
1991	Tor Books/St. Martin's Press	
1992	Tor Books/St. Martin's Press	
1993	Tor Books/St. Martin's Press	
1994	Tor Books/St. Martin's Press	
1995	Tor Books/St. Martin's Press	
1996	Tor Books/St. Martin's Press	
1997	Tor Books/St. Martin's Press	
1998	Tor Books/St. Martin's Press	
1999	Tor Books	
2000	Tor Books	
2001	Tor Books	
2002	Tor Books	
2003	Tor Books	
2004	Tor Books	
2005	Tor Books	
2006	Tor Books	
2007	Tor Books	
2008	Tor Books	
2009	Tor Books	
2010	Tor Books	
2011	Tor Books	
2012	Tor Books	
2013	Tor Books	
2014	Tor Books	
2015	Tor Books	
2016	Tor Books	
2017	Tor Books	
2018	Tor Books	
2019	Tor Books	
2020	Tor Books	
2021	Tor Books	
2022	Tor Books	
2023	Tor Books	
2024	Tor Books	
2025	Subterranean Press	
2026	Orbit	
