= Charter Communications (publisher) =

Former publishing company

- Industry: Publishing
- Founded: 1960
- Headquarters: United States

Charter Communications was a publishing company active in the 1960s and 1970s. They acquired Ace Books in 1970 but ran out of money the following year. This was partly because they had paid large cash advances for books they believed would become bestsellers, such as The Anchorman by Ned Calmer.

The company was purchased by Grosset & Dunlap in 1976.
