= The Fallon Blood =

1980 novel by James Oliver Rigney Jr.

- First edition
- Author: Reagan O'Neal (real name James Oliver Rigney, Jr.) AKA Robert Jordan
- Language: English
- Series: Michael Fallon trilogy
- Genre: Historical Romance novel
- Publisher: Ace Books
- Publication date: 1 February 1980
- Publication place: United States
- Media type: Print (Paperback & Hardback)
- Pages: 471
- ISBN: 0-441-22665-5
- OCLC: 6137409
- Followed by: The Fallon Pride

The Fallon Blood is a novel written by fantasy author James Oliver Rigney, Jr. (more commonly known as Robert Jordan) under the name Reagan O'Neal. It is typical of the genre historical romance. It is the first book in the Michael Fallon trilogy. The more common 1995 printing is a new reprint, released by Tor Books under the Forge imprint in order to capitalize on the success of The Wheel of Time.

== Plot summary ==
=== The Fallon Blood ===
In The Fallon Blood, escaping brutal English overlords, 1760s Irishman Michael Fallon becomes an indentured servant to Charleston, South Carolina merchant Thomas Carver, where his infatuation with Carver's sensual daughter Elizabeth causes life-changing complications.

His father died in the Battle Of Culloden. The threat of Irish Pickets forced Michael and his mother in both hiding and poverty. His mother sacrificed her own health to keep Michael fed for three years, when she died of malnutrition. Grogan "adopted" Michael and abused him in child labor. Michael ran away at the age of fifteen, vowing that none of his children would suffer the tragedy of poverty.

Sometime later Michael became a soldier, and was taught the sword by Timothy Cavanaugh. His time with the army was a full seven years, after which he managed to own land in Ireland. Michael's prospects seemed fruitful until the day he killed an Englishman colonel by accident. Since the punishment of killing an Englishman was death, Michael was left no choice but to flee Ireland to the American colonies, where he became an indentured servant to Thomas Carver. This was the "most fateful moment of his life." He fell instantly in love with Carver's daughter Elizabeth.

Elizabeth did not return Michael's feelings until he dueled with Justin Fourrier, scion of Fourrier family. Although Justin was of high blood, his sword skills paled next to Michael's, who won easily. This was the beginning of Justin's hatred for Michael, and in turn, Elizabeth's desire of Michael.

Elizabeth's desire was not love, however. She originally wanted a flirtation with the bound man to instill jealousy in Justin. It was her hope that the jealousy would make Justin a lover, instead of a distant man who cared only for her inheritance.

Elizabeth's plans culminated in a night of seduction, which hopefully would force Michael into marriage. However, Michael wanted to "set her up as a queen, not as a destitute." Michael's actions towards building their future left Elizabeth alone with child. Horrified of the shame of wedding with child, she manipulated Justin into raping her so that he would give her his hand in marriage.

Michael buried himself in working his plantation Tir Alanin to forget Elizabeth, and dabbled in aiding American resistance for the same purpose. He became good friends with Justin's brothers Louis and Henri, who then introduced him to their sister Gabrielle. Sometimes later Fourrier leaked news of Michael's slaying of the Englishman colonel and he was quite close of rotting away in prison. Saved by Gabrielle's plan, the two married.

The American Revolution separated Michael and Gabrielle for years, though the two mended the damage between them in raising their family. Twenty years pass, finding Michael with son James and daughter Catherine. On constant guard from Justin's assassinations, Michael met his son Robert Fallon (from Elizabeth). His presence tore a rift in the Fallon family, who more or less hate Robert for his status as a bastard. Gabrielle made the first step towards bridging that chasm when Fourrier assassins set the Fallon house on fire and subsequently killed both Gabrielle and James.

=== The Fallon Pride ===
In The Fallon Pride, Michael Fallon's son Robert Fallon survives years at sea fighting Barbary pirates and enduring the siege at Tripoli. He then returns to America with an Irish wife, Moira McConnell, and goes into business in Charleston where he raises a somewhat troublesome family.

In the eve of the Revolution, the Fourrier family is forced out of the colonies because their centuries-worth of power has no place in the new nation. It is then that Elizabeth accidentally reveals Robert's true heritage. With all of his hatred on the Fallon line, Justin spent years abusing Robert just to see the look on Elizabeth's face. "She fought for food, clothes, an education . . ." Years of spousal abuse had ground Elizabeth's will until she died. Her last words to Robert was the name of his real father.

Robert flees to the safety of the sea. During that time he has ventured to Charleston, though forcibly avoids his father, as he does not wish to be a burden to the Fallon family. His luck runs out when his name is casually offered to Michael, who then confronts him. The two try to make amends with Michael's family, though Gabrielle is livid and refuses to give Robert the benefit of the doubt. James takes this one step further, slugging Robert and warning him not to come back. A spoiled noble, James thinks him invincible due to his "noble" bloodline, and is thus astonished that he is beaten by a bastard.

At the end of the Fallon Blood, Robert kills Henry Tyree to save his father, and leads Michael from his grief over Gabrielle's death with a question of sizing a boat Robert wants to purchase. This attempt works, coaxing Michael out of his misery and allows Michael to move on with his life.

Sometime before the Fallon Pride, Robert develops incestuous feelings towards his half-sister Catherine. Like his father Robert buries himself in the arms of another woman, a French girl by the name of Louise de Chardonnay. Despite the stalker-like intents of powerful sea mogul Murad Reis, Robert takes Louise as a mistress, who eventually bears his first son James. Before they can marry, however, Robert falls victim to Murad's revenge and is shipped to North Africa. For three years Robert fights Tripoli forces under the command of a Colonel Eaten, only to find upon his return that his father is dead, and Louise marries a Thomas Martin.

Drunk on both grief and alcohol, Robert succumbs to his passion and sleeps with Catherine. The incest continues for years until finally a child named Edward is born. Edward's birth snaps Robert out of his passion for Catherine. He charges his niece Charollete to protect her new brother, and retreats back to the sea.

Years pass. Robert falls in love with Irish girl Moira McDonnel, and returns to America with her as his wife. Like his father before him, war looms on the horizon, drawing Robert away from his family. After the war Robert is content with the hope of both rebuilding his family's wealth and raising his family.

Robert has a minor role in the third volume, the Fallon Legacy. There are two pivotal moments that involve him. First he takes another French mistress named Lucille Gautier. This only exasperates the situation with his wife Moira, who is waging war with Robert over allowing his bastards into his household and the defense of his incestuous son Edward, who has grown up a spoiled noble much like his deceased half-uncle James. Robert breaks his defense for Edward when Edward arranges the kidnapping and rape of his half-sister Elizabeth by Lucien Fourrier's son Edouard.

Robert Fallon is a source of ironic circumstance. His life of survival and the dangers he has endured makes him a close parallel of his father, who possesses the same will and determination. James, on the other hand, grows up a nobleman with the blind faith of wealth through breeding. He lacks Michael's endurance, thus aligning James more towards his uncle Justin Fourrier than Michael Fallon.

=== The Fallon Legacy ===
In The Fallon Legacy, James Fallon, the last scion of the Fallon line, strikes south and west, adventuring in New Orleans, Missouri, and finally Texas (then still part of Mexico). He loves and loses women, ranches and breeds horses, and becomes entangled in the schemes of shady men and women. Enemies made by Michael and Robert during their lifetimes converge upon James, who must find out if he has strength enough to stand against them.

== Characters in the Fallon trilogy ==
- Michael Fallon – father to the family.
- Robert Fallon – Michael's illegitimate son through Elizabeth Carver.
- James Fallon – Robert's illegitimate son through Louise de Chardonnay.
