= Conan the Destroyer (novel) =

Book by Robert Jordan

- Cover of the first edition.
- Author: Robert Jordan
- Language: English
- Series: Conan the Barbarian
- Genre: Sword and sorcery
- Publisher: Tor Books
- Publication date: 1984
- Publication place: United States
- Media type: Print (hardback and paperback)

Conan the Destroyer is a fantasy novel written by Robert Jordan featuring Robert E. Howard's seminal sword and sorcery hero Conan the Barbarian, a novelization of the feature film of the same name. It was first published in paperback by Tor Books in 1984.

== Plot summary ==
Queen Taramis of Shadizar promises to bring Conan's lost love Valeria back to life if the Cimmerian will procure two magical items that she hopes will gain her ultimate power, a wizard's gem and a horn that can awaken the dreaming god Dagoth. He undertakes the quest together with his thief partner Malak and Taramis' niece Jehnna and henchman Bombaata. On their journey they are joined by two additional allies whom Conan saves from dire fates; the magician Akiro and the female warrior Zula. At their goal, the castle of the wizard Amon-Rama, Jehnna is kidnapped. Thanks to Akiro's magic she is located in Amon-Rama's lair and a way in is discovered. Inside, Conan is separated from the others and forced to battle a Man-Ape in a hall of mirrors, which he is only able to defeat by destroying the mirrors. He also mortally wounds the wizard, who is hiding behind one of them. Jehnna, who is the only person who can safely handle the wizard's gem, retrieves the first magical item.

Afterward, the group beats off an attack by Corinthian soldiers and continues on to the fortress that holds the horn. It is retrieved at the cost of a battle with its Dagoth-worshipping keepers, whose leader Akiro defeats in a sorcerous duel. Bombaata and Jehnna escape through a tunnel, which the former closes to the others by starting a landslide. Back at Taramis' palace, the queen conducts a ritual to awaken Dagoth that entails the placing of the horn on the forehead of the sleeping deity, and ultimately the sacrifice of Jehnna. Conan, Akiro, and Zula, having survived the landslide, interrupt the proceedings.

Conan fights and defeats Bombaata while Zula rescues Jehnna. In the absence of the sacrifice, Dagoth is an uncontrollable monster on his revival, eating Taramis and threatening the destruction of everything else. On the advice of Akiro, Conan rips the horn from Dagoth's forehead, and the creature finally falls. In the aftermath, Jehnna succeeds to the throne of Shadazar and takes Zula, Akiro, and Malak as advisors. She offers Conan her hand and a place at her side as king, but the Cimmerian prefers to win his own kingdom.

== Reception ==
Don D'Ammassa writes "The novelization of the second Conan movie contains none of the annoying inconsistencies of the first. ... This wasn't a bad movie and the novelization is quite readable."

The novelization was also reviewed by Sheldon Jaffery in Fantasy Review, September 1984, and W. Paul Ganley in Fantasy Mongers No. 11, Summer 1984.

Preceded by Conan the Magnificent	Tor Conan series (publication order)	Succeeded by Conan the Victorious
