= Robert Jordan =

American fantasy writer (1948–2007)

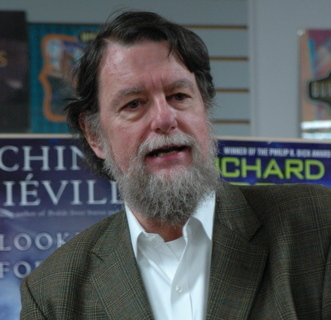
- Jordan at a Knife of Dreams signing, San Diego, November 2005
- Born: James Oliver Rigney Jr. October 17, 1948; Charleston, South Carolina, U.S.
- Died: September 16, 2007 (aged 58); Charleston, South Carolina, U.S.
- Education: The Citadel (BS)
- Occupation: Novelist
- Spouse: Harriet McDougal (m. 1981)
- Writing career
- Years active: 1977-2007
- Genre: Fantasy
- Notable work: The Wheel of Time

Signature
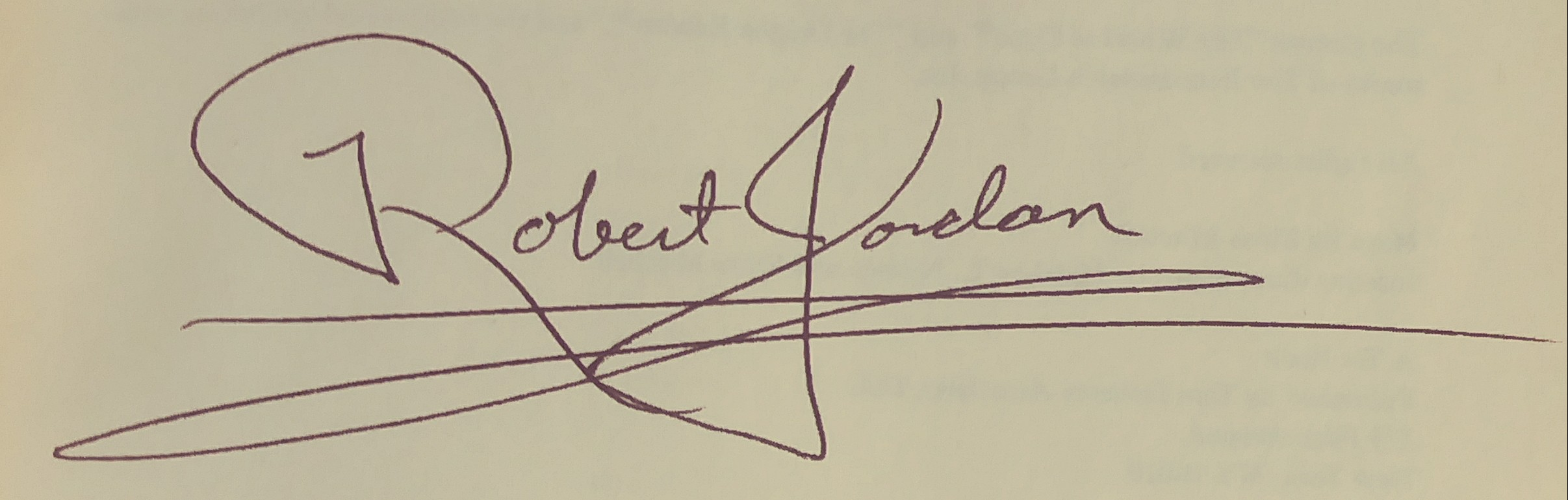

James Oliver Rigney Jr. (October 17, 1948 – September 16, 2007), known by his pen name Robert Jordan, was an American author of epic fantasy. His The Wheel of Time series, which comprises 14 books and a prequel novel, is among the highest-selling book series of all time, with 90 million copies sold.

In his earlier career he was one of several writers to produce original Conan the Barbarian novels. Jordan was the best-known of several pen names he used, adopting different monikers for different genres.

== Early life ==
Jordan was born in Charleston, South Carolina, on October 17, 1948, to James and Eva Rigney (née Grooms). His father James was a World War II veteran and served as a police officer before working at the Charleston Naval Shipyard. He taught himself to read at the age of four years, because his older brother did not finish reading White Fang to him and Jordan "wanted to know what happened," and at five was reading Mark Twain and Jules Verne. He went to Clemson University, where he played football as a lineman, but dropped out after one year and enlisted in the U.S. Army.

=== Military service ===
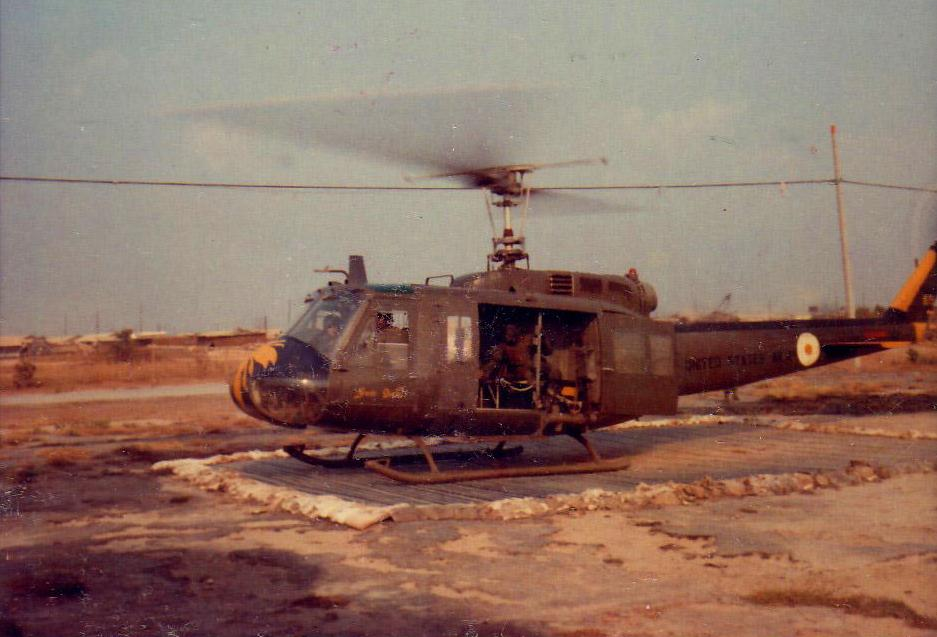
A Bell UH-1 Iroquois photographed by Jordan during his second tour in Vietnam, 1969–70.

He served two tours of duty during the Vietnam War as a helicopter gunner, from 1968 to 1970. He supported Bell UH-1 Iroquois helicopters, and was deployed to Saigon and later Bien Hoa. Asked about his experiences in 2003, he stated that they flew in "Zone C, The Phu Rieng Rubber Plantation, down to Cu Chi in the delta, over to Nui Ba Dinh, Black Virgin Mountain, and we were flying into Cambodia long before the Parrot's Beak". He survived a helicopter crash aged 19, which affected his views on mortality. During his time in the military one of his nicknames was "Iceman", in reference to an incident in which he intercepted a number of PAVN troops crossing a river. Jordan strongly disliked the nickname. In a 2007 blog post, he stated that he "strangled that SOB, drove a stake through his heart, and buried him face down under a crossroad outside Saigon before coming home, because I knew that guy wasn't made to survive in a civilian environment." He preferred the nickname Ganesha he attained, as "the remover of obstacles". He was awarded the Distinguished Flying Cross with oak leaf cluster, the Bronze Star with "V" and oak leaf cluster, and two Vietnamese Gallantry Crosses with palm.

After returning from Vietnam in 1970, Jordan studied physics at The Citadel Military College of South Carolina. He graduated in 1974 with a Bachelor of Science degree and began working for the U.S. Navy as a nuclear engineer. He designed tests and overhauled nuclear reactors for US naval vessels. In 1977 he fell during a walk between the dry dock and his office and faced a serious knee injury, followed by a life-threatening blood clot and an extended hospital stay. He found that he was bored by the work of other writers while in hospital, and believing he could do better, decided to begin writing himself. According to McDougal, Jordan physically threw the book across the room and said "I can do better than that."

== Career ==
=== Early works ===
Jordan began writing in 1977. His first writing project was a fantasy novel entitled Warriors of the Altaii which was written by hand over three and a half months and then typed up when he returned to work. He contacted Donald A. Wolheim at DAW Books and immediately received an offer, but after attempting to negotiate a minor detail the offer was rejected, citing his "excessive demands". Despite the lack of a publishing deal, he tendered his resignation from his nuclear engineering job, confident that he could write full time.

A local bookstore owner put Jordan in touch with the editor Harriet McDougal, who read Altaii. Instead of editing this early work she asked for a new story, which led Jordan to write The Fallon Blood, published in 1980 by McDougal's personal imprint, Popham Press. Jordan began dating McDougal and his late-1970s Dungeons & Dragons game with her son Will would serve as inspiration for The Wheel of Time.

Jordan wrote three books in the Fallon saga and planned it to be a longer series chronicling the history of the United States from the time of the Civil War to the Vietnam War. While the works sold fairly well, Jordan became bored after the third one and decided to explore other avenues. Jordan stopped using Popham Press in the early 1980s as he was aware that it was owned by McDougal and he was about to marry his "only source of income". With this in mind, his future books would be published by other companies while McDougal would continue to edit his works. He also wrote the western Cheyenne Raiders around this time, his only book to use a different editor.

=== Conan the Barbarian ===
Tom Doherty at Tor Books obtained the rights to Conan the Barbarian and needed a novel very quickly. McDougal recommended Jordan because she knew he had written his first novel, Warriors of the Altaii, in a very short timespan. Jordan initially turned down the offer because he was concerned about writing in an established fictional universe from another author. He later accepted and enjoyed the project, though he found it difficult to be creative within the strict format rules of the books. According to McDougal, Jordan was "brooding" at the time about the Soviet–Afghan War and these thoughts were present in his writing. He would go on to write seven of these from 1982 to 1984.

So he thought I could write something fast, and he was right, and I liked it. It was fun writing something completely over the top, full of purple prose, and in a weak moment I agreed to do five more and the novelization of the second Conan movie. I've decided that those things were very good discipline for me. I had to work with a character and a world that had already been created and yet find a way to say something new about the character and the world. That was a very good exercise.

— Robert Jordan, 2003

=== The Wheel of Time ===
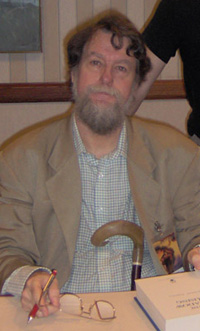
Jordan signing books at DragonCon 2005

On the back of the successful Conan books, Doherty asked if he had any other book ideas, and Jordan discussed his plans for an epic fantasy series, of up to three books in length. Jordan's work on The Wheel of Time began in 1984 and ballooned in scope from the initial three book vision. The series would occupy much of his writing time for the remainder of his life. He completed 12 books in his lifetime, including the prequel New Spring. Reviewers and fans of the earlier books noted a slowing of the pace of events in the last few installments written solely by Jordan owing to the expansion of the scale of the series as a whole.

Diagnosed with a terminal heart condition in the mid-2000s, he became concerned that he might not live to complete the series and compiled additional notes beyond those he already had so that another could finish the "final" book, A Memory of Light. He shared all of the significant plot details with his family not long before he died with this in mind. He maintained that in doing so the book would get published even if "the worst actually happens". After Jordan's death in September 2007, Brandon Sanderson took on that role. Sanderson completed the story across three volumes from 2009 to 2013, the last of which bore Jordan's title A Memory of Light.

== Personal life ==
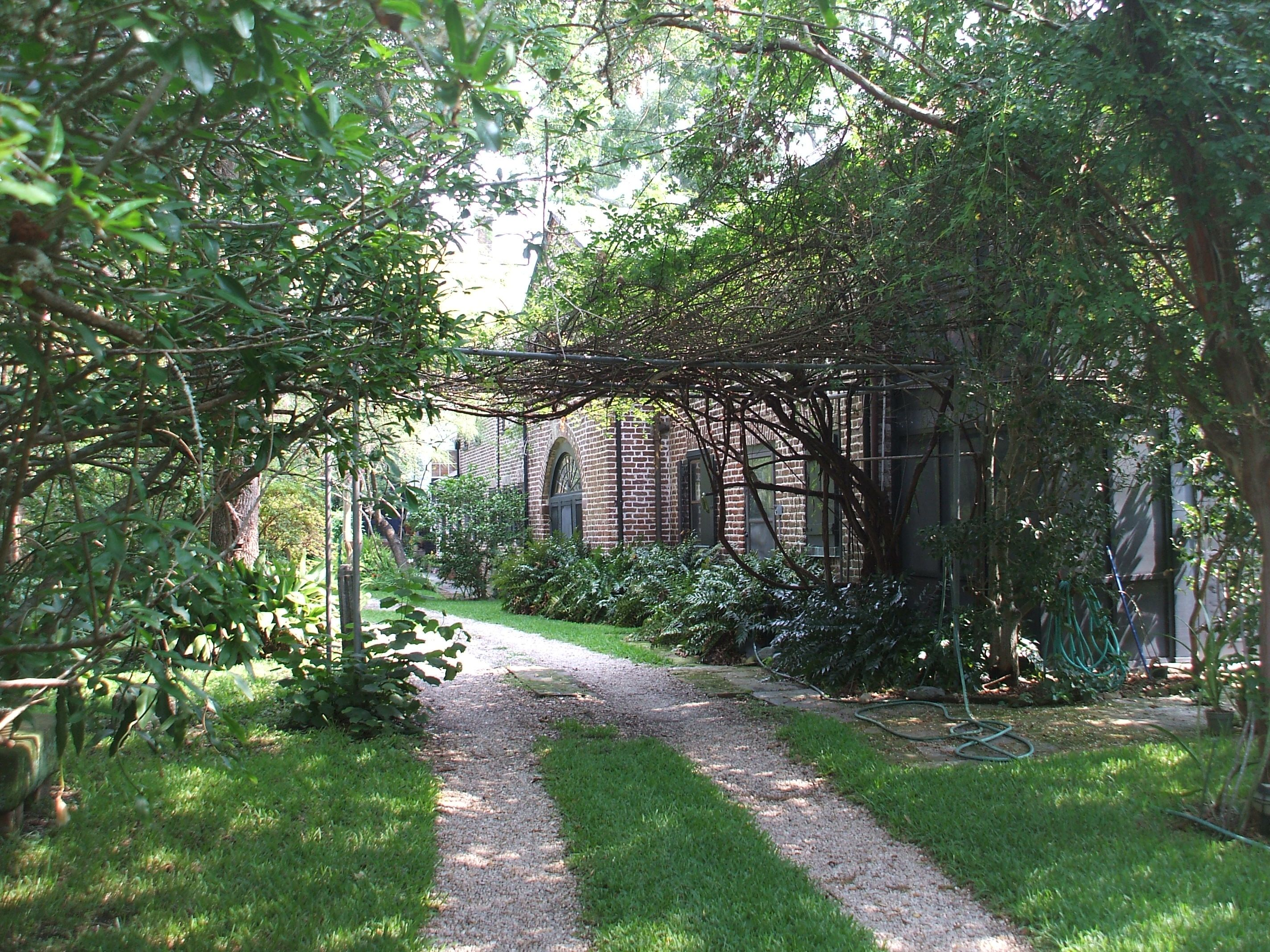
Jordan's office in Charleston, South Carolina, where much of his writing was done

Robert Jordan was a history enthusiast and enjoyed hunting, fishing, sailing, poker, chess, pool, and pipe-collecting. He described himself as a "high church" Episcopalian and received communion more than once a week. Politically, he described himself as a "libertarian monarchist".

Jordan's favorite authors were John D. MacDonald, Jane Austen, Louis L'Amour, Charles Dickens, Robert A. Heinlein, Mark Twain and Michel de Montaigne. He was a prodigious reader, reading around 400 books a year in the early 1990s, and his home library had over 14,000 books at the time of his death.

=== Relationships ===
As a younger man, Jordan was in a consensual non-monogamous relationship with two women. D’Silva, an academic writing for Reactor, compared Jordan's experiences to modern polyamory. This inspired the relationships seen in his writing, and he was open about the topic in interviews.

I had two girlfriends simultaneously, who arranged my dating schedule between them, who was going to date me on which night. They chipped in together to buy me birthday presents and Christmas presents. You know, they just sort of shared me between them, you know. And they had been friends before, and I am not quite sure whether or not they made the decision they were both going to date me or not, on their own, before they first met me, it just came about.

— Robert Jordan, speaking at Dragon Con, September 4, 2005

Jordan later entered into a relationship with his editor Harriet McDougal, whom he married in 1981. Given the two lived together, rather than presenting McDougal with a completed manuscript, he would present the books chapter by chapter for revisions in a process she termed "curb-side editing". She did not feel that their romantic relationship conflicted with their relationship as editor and writer. The two were together for the remainder of his life, and McDougal is today seen as the authority on the subject of Jordan's writing.

=== Illness and death ===
On March 23, 2006, Jordan revealed that he had been diagnosed with cardiac amyloidosis and that, with treatment, his median life expectancy was four years. In a separate weblog post, he encouraged his fans not to worry about him and stated that he intended to have a long and creative life. He began chemotherapy at Mayo Clinic during early April 2006. He participated in a study of the drug Revlimid, which had been approved recently for multiple myeloma but not yet tested for primary amyloidosis.

Jordan died on September 16, 2007. His funeral service was on September 19, 2007. He was cremated and his ashes buried in the churchyard of St. James Church in Goose Creek, outside Charleston, South Carolina.

== Legacy ==
Some of Jordan's work was published posthumously. Using Jordan's notes, The Wheel of Time was completed by Brandon Sanderson in the form of three final books, ending with A Memory of Light in 2013. An encyclopedia for the series, based on Jordan's notes as well as the books themselves, was released as The Wheel of Time Companion in 2015. Jordan's first novel Warrior of Altaii- which he wrote in the late 1970s and discarded at the time- was ultimately edited by McDougal and published in 2019. McDougal considers the book prototypical to The Wheel of Time, with some themes and elements present in the much earlier work.

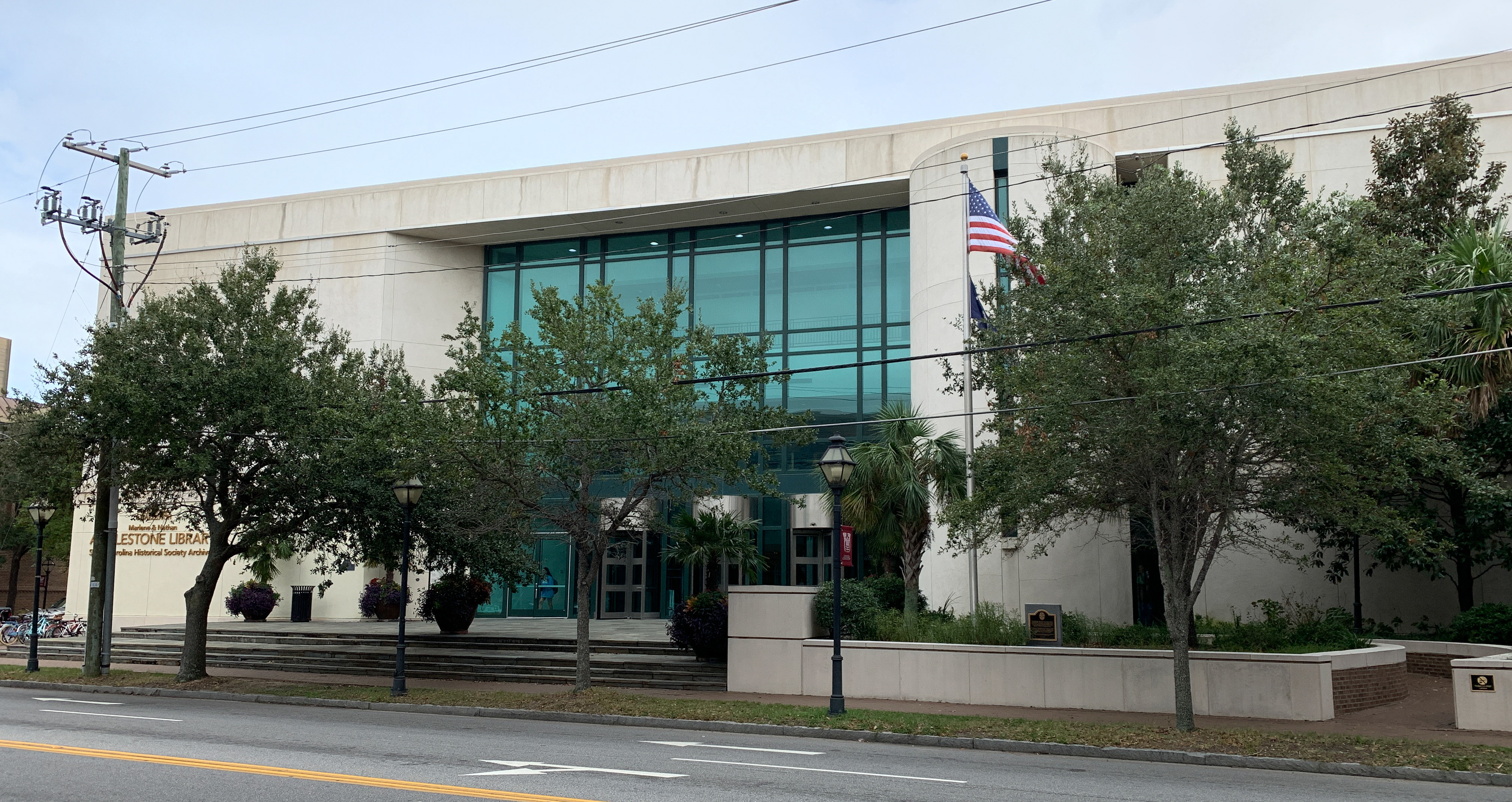
The James Oliver Rigney Jr., papers are held by the Addlestone Library

Jordan's papers- including his writing notes and some unpublished manuscripts- were donated to the College of Charleston in 2012 by McDougal, where they are held as part of a special collection. A ceremony was held at the college in January 2013 to mark the occasion, with Brandon Sanderson attending as part of the signing tour for A Memory of Light. The collection is extensive, and includes replica swords and costumes from the series. As part of the collection, the library is in possession of unpublished Jordan works including John One-Eye, Morgan, April the 15th and You're a Nice Man or What Did I Do to Deserve That. Access to some records including Jordan's correspondence papers is restricted, and will not be available for viewing until thirty years after his death (September 2037). One folder in the unpublished collection, "From the Tale of Five Sisters", is marked with such a restriction. The collection was studied by Michael Livingston while writing Origins of the Wheel of Time: The Legends and Mythologies that Inspired Robert Jordan in 2022.

Jordan had discussed several other book projects before his illness, including side books for The Wheel of Time. He left no notes for these and did not intend for another to write them after his death, and both Brandon Sanderson and Harriet McDougal have ruled out these works. He also planned other writing projects outside of the franchise, including another fantasy series named Infinity of Heaven and a book about his experiences in the Vietnam War, but these were never written.

Jordan was posthumously inducted into the South Carolina Academy of Authors in 2008, in an event which included many of his friends and family. For A Memory of Light, Jordan and Sanderson were both nominated for a Hugo award in 2014. Jordan has been cited as an influence by George R. R. Martin. Martin doubted that A Song of Ice and Fire would have been published were it not for Jordan breaking down the trilogy format for fantasy and enabling the publication of longer series. Jordan's works remain popular and in 2009 a literary convention named JordanCon was inaugurated to celebrate his writings as well as that of other authors. It continues to run as of 2026.

== Pseudonyms ==
Born Rigney Jr., he published his works under pseudonyms or "pen names", of which Robert Jordan was his best known. He used different titles for different genres:

- Robert Jordan- Fantasy (The Wheel of Time, Conan the Barbarian, Warriors of Altaii)
- Chang Lung- Dance criticism
- Reagan O'Neal- Historical fiction (The Fallon Saga)
- Jackson O'Reilly- Western (Cheyenne Raiders)

Given the recognisability of the "Robert Jordan" name, some reprints of his early works make use of both the original pen name as well as "Robert Jordan". For example, the 2000 reprint of Cheyenne Raiders is marked "Robert Jordan writing as Jackson O'Reilly" Jordan wanted the original pen names to be preserved to distinguish his early material from his later fantasy works, and said in 2001 that he had introduced font size requirements to prevent "Jordan" being written more prominently.

Jordan never published any books under his actual name. This was reserved for a hypothetical book about his experiences in the Vietnam War which he never wrote. He also claimed to have ghostwritten an "international thriller" that as of 2005 was still believed to have been written by someone else.
