= Tor Books =

American book publisher

- The 2016 logo
- Parent company: Tor Publishing Group ultimately Macmillan Publishers
- Founded: April 2, 1980; 46 years ago
- Founder: Tom Doherty; Harriet McDougal; Jim Baen
- Country of origin: United States
- Headquarters location: Equitable Building, New York City
- Distribution: Macmillan (US); Melia Publishing Services (UK)
- Key people: Tom Doherty
- Publication types: Books, e-books
- Imprints: Forge, Starscape, Tor Teen, Orb, Tordotcom, Nightfire, Bramble
- Official website: us.macmillan.com/torpublishinggroup/

Tor Books is the primary imprint of Tor Publishing Group (previously Tom Doherty Associates), a publishing company based in New York City. It primarily publishes science fiction and fantasy titles.

== History ==
Tor was founded by Tom Doherty in 1980, with Harriet McDougal and Jim Baen joining him from Ace as the editorial staff. (Baen and Doherty founded Baen Books three years later.) They were soon joined by Barbara Doherty and Katherine Pendill, who then composed the original startup team.

Tor is a word meaning a rocky pinnacle, as depicted in Tor's logo. Tor Books was sold to St. Martin's Press in 1987. Along with St. Martin's Press; Henry Holt; and Farrar, Straus and Giroux, it became part of the Holtzbrinck group, now part of Macmillan in the US.

In June 2019, Tor and other Macmillan imprints moved from the Flatiron Building, to larger offices in the Equitable Building.

== Imprints ==
Tor is the primary imprint of Tor Publishing Group. The Forge imprint publishes an array of fictional titles, including historical novels and thrillers. The Nightfire imprint publishes horror, largely but not exclusively with science fiction and fantasy elements. The Bramble imprint publishes romance and romantic stories with elements of other genres. Tor Books has two imprints for young readers: Starscape (for readers 10 years of age and up) and Tor Teen (for readers 13 years of age and up). The Tordotcom imprint focuses on short works such as novellas, shorter novels and serializations.

A United Kingdom sister imprint, Tor UK, specializes in science fiction, fantasy, and horror, and publishes young-adult crossover fiction based on computer-game franchises. Tor UK briefly maintained an open submission policy, which ended in January 2013.

Orb Books publishes science-fiction classics such as A. E. van Vogt's Slan.

Tor Teen publishes young-adult novels such as Cory Doctorow's Little Brother and repackages novels such as Orson Scott Card's Ender's Game for younger readers.

Tor Labs produces podcasts.

A German sister imprint, Fischer Tor, was founded in August 2016 as an imprint of S. Fischer Verlag (which also belongs to Holtzbrinck Publishing Group). It publishes international titles translated into German, as well as original German works. Fischer Tor also publishes the German online magazine Tor Online, which is based on the same concept as the English Tor.com online magazine, but has its own independent content.

== Authors ==
The logo used until 2015

Authors published by Tor and Forge include:

- Kevin J. Anderson
- Kage Baker
- Ben Bova
- Brom
- Steven Brust
- Orson Scott Card
- Jonathan Carroll
- Jack L. Chalker
- Myke Cole
- Charles de Lint
- Philip K. Dick
- Cory Doctorow
- Steven Erikson
- Sarah Gailey
- Terry Goodkind
- Steven Gould
- Alex Grecian
- Eileen Gunn
- James E. Gunn
- Brian Herbert
- Glen Hirshberg
- TJ Klune
- Robert Jordan
- Sherrilyn Kenyon
- Mary Robinette Kowal
- George R. R. Martin
- Arkady Martine
- Richard Matheson
- L. E. Modesitt, Jr.
- Tamsyn Muir
- Andre Norton
- Harold Robbins
- Brandon Sanderson
- John Scalzi
- V. E. Schwab
- Lucy A. Snyder
- Martha Wells
- Skyler White
- Gene Wolfe

Tor UK has published authors such as Douglas Adams, Rjurik Davidson, Amanda Hocking, China Miéville, Adam Nevill, and Adrian Tchaikovsky.

== Ebooks ==
Tor publishes a range of its works as ebooks and, in 2012, Doherty announced that his imprints would sell only DRM-free ebooks by July of that year. One year later, Tor stated that the removal of DRM had not harmed its ebook business, so they would continue selling them DRM-free.

In July 2018, Macmillan Publishers and Tor prompted a boycott spread across social media websites and library bulletin boards after they announced that Tor's e-books would no longer be made available for libraries to purchase and lend to borrowers, via digital distribution services such as OverDrive, until four months after their initial publication date. The company cited the "direct and adverse impact" of electronic lending on retail eBook sales but suggested that the change was part of a "test program" and could be reevaluated.

== Accolades ==
Tor won the Locus Award for Best Science Fiction Publisher in 36 years from 1988 to 2024 inclusive.

In March 2014, Worlds Without End listed Tor as the second-most awarded and nominated publisher of science fiction, fantasy and horror books, after Gollancz. At that time, Tor had received 316 nominations and 54 wins for 723 published novels, written by 197 authors. In the following year, Tor surpassed Gollancz to become the top publisher on the list.

By March 2018, Tor's record had increased to 579 nominations and 111 wins, across 16 tracked awards given in the covered genres, with a total of 2,353 published novels written by 576 authors.
