= The Stormlight Archive =

Series of epic fantasy novels by Brandon Sanderson

- The official series logo drawn by Isaac Stewart
- The Way of Kings (2010); Words of Radiance (2014); Oathbringer (2017); Rhythm of War (2020); Wind and Truth (2024)
- Author: Brandon Sanderson
- Illustrator: Isaac Stewart; Ben McSweeney; Greg Call; Dan Dos Santos; Howard Lyon
- Cover artist: Michael Whelan (US); Sam Green (UK)
- Country: United States
- Genre: High Fantasy
- Publisher: Tor Books (United States)
- Published: August 31, 2010 – present
- Media type: Print (hardback and paperback), audiobook, e-book
- No. of books: Five published, ten planned

The Stormlight Archive is a high fantasy novel series written by American author Brandon Sanderson, planned to consist of ten novels. As of 2024, the series comprises five published novels and two novellas, set within Sanderson's broader Cosmere universe. The first novel, The Way of Kings, was published on August 31, 2010. The second novel, Words of Radiance, was published on March 4, 2014 and debuted at number one on The New York Times Best Seller List. This was repeated by Oathbringer (released November 14, 2017) and Rhythm of War (released November 17, 2020). The fifth novel, Wind and Truth, was released December 6, 2024. Sanderson has indicated that he will start drafting the latter half of the series after he finishes writing the upcoming Era Three Mistborn trilogy and the two Elantris sequels. The series has been adapted as a VR Experience and a tabletop roleplaying game.

== Publication history ==
Sanderson completed the first draft of The Way of Kings in 2003, and initially referred to it as being part of a prospective series titled The Oathshards Series. The first draft of the manuscript was among over a dozen books written by Sanderson before his debut publication Elantris (2005). Six chapters of this early version were included in the anthology Altered Perceptions (2014) and the original version of the book remains available on the author's official website.

The published book is significantly different from the original manuscript because of a substantial rewrite prior to its 2010 publication. From June to August 2010, Tor Books published sample chapters from The Way of Kings on its official website, along with an introduction by Sanderson. In its first week of release, The Way of Kings was No. 7 on The New York Times Best Seller list.

In October 2010, Sanderson indicated that he planned to release the second book in the series in 2012, approximately two years after the release of the first book, as he was occupied in the interim writing A Memory of Light, the final book of The Wheel of Time. This would be followed by the release of the third book about a year later. However, after completing the first draft of A Memory of Light, Sanderson said the book would be pushed back to a 2014 release. The second book was initially titled Highprince of War, but after refocusing the book on a different character, Sanderson tentatively titled it The Book of Endless Pages before eventually settling on Words of Radiance.

Before the release of the third book, Sanderson publicly revealed several chapters in blog posts, conventions, and publication in an anthology. The first draft of the book was finished on December 9, 2016, and the book, titled Oathbringer, was released on November 14, 2017.

The first draft of the fourth book was completed in December 2019. The title, Rhythm of War, was announced on the Tor website on February 10, 2020, and the cover was revealed six months later. The book was finished in July 2020. In a Facebook post, the author said that the final word count was "roughly 460,000" words, the length of Oathbringer, and the book would have 112 chapters, plus differently numbered interludes, prologue, and epilogue. Rhythm of War was published on November 17, 2020.

The fifth book was first announced in January 2022. It was initially titled Knights of Wind and Truth but was later shortened to Wind and Truth. The first draft was finished in December 2023 and the book was published December 6, 2024. At 491,000 words, it is currently the longest book in the series.

== Books ==
| # | Title | Hardcover Pages | Paperback Pages | Chapters | Words | Audio | Publication Date | Character Focus |
|---|---|---|---|---|---|---|---|---|
| 1 | The Way of Kings | 1,001 | 1,258 | 75 | 383,389 | 45h 34m | August 31, 2010 | Kaladin Stormblessed |
| 2 | Words of Radiance | 1,080 | 1,328 | 89 | 399,431 | 48h 14m | March 4, 2014 | Shallan Davar |
| 2.5 | Edgedancer (novella) | 272 | | 20 | 40,666 | 6h 26m | November 22, 2016 | Lift |
| 3 | Oathbringer | 1,233 | 1,243 | 122 | 451,912 | 55h 02m | November 14, 2017 | Dalinar Kholin |
| 3.5 | Dawnshard (novella) | 290 | | 21 | 56,282 | 7h 10m | November 5, 2020 | Rysn Ftori |
| 4 | Rhythm of War | 1,232 | 1,296 | 117 | 455,891 | 57h 26m | November 17, 2020 | Venli and Eshonai |
| 4.5 | Horneater (novella) | | | | | | forthcoming | Lunamor/"Rock" |
| 5 | Wind and Truth | 1,344 | 1,329 | 147 | 491,000 | 62h 48m | December 6, 2024 | Szeth-son-son-Vallano |
| Total | | 6,452 | 6,454 | 591 | 2,278,571 | 282h 40m | 2010–present | |

Ten books are planned in the series, which is split into two sets of five books each. Sanderson described the planned story arc of the second set of five books as a "sequel" to the first set, with some appearances of characters from the first set. The biggest time skip in the series will occur between the fifth and sixth books.

As of 2020, two novellas have been published. The first novella, Edgedancer, features the character Lift and is set between Words of Radiance and Oathbringer. Edgedancer was originally published in Arcanum Unbounded: The Cosmere Collection in 2016. A standalone edition of Edgedancer was published on October 17, 2017. The second novella, Dawnshard, features the characters Rysn and Lopen and was published in November 2020. It takes place in the one-year gap between Oathbringer and Rhythm of War.

=== Short works ===
Two short stories were released as part of Story Deck, a set of collectible cards released in 2024 by Dragonsteel. Both were based on cut concepts from the development of Words of Radiance. In 2025, the two stories were bundled together and released as a single volume on the Dragonsteel website. Sanderson has suggested that Elsecaller in particular could be expanded into a novella one day but that this is not currently planned.

- Elsecaller, by Sanderson and Dan Wells, adapts a cut section from Words of Radiance in which Jasnah travels Shadesmar.
- Lopen the First of Alethkar, by Sanderson and Isaac Stewart, details Lopen's brief stint as king amidst the assassination attempts on Elhokar.

== Major characters ==
- Kaladin Stormblessed – A surgeon apprentice who became a talented soldier, but got betrayed and enslaved. With Dalinar's help, he becomes the leader of the Order of Windrunners. He is bonded to an honorspren named Sylphrena. He later becomes a Herald of Windrunners.
- Szeth-son-son-Vallano – Known as the Assassin in White, Szeth was honor-bound to serve his masters, even if it meant killing numerous rulers. He later learns that his punishment was unfair and becomes a member of the Order of Skybreakers. He spoke the Fifth Ideal but he chose to break his bond with spren.
- Shallan Davar – A minor noble with dissociative identity disorder. She is a scholar and an artist, who becomes a spy and the leader of the Order of Lightweavers. She is bonded to a cryptic named Pattern. She ended up in Shadesmar after the True Desolation.
- Dalinar Kholin – A general and nobleman, striving to be a better man by following the codes of war. He becomes a Bondsmith after bonding with the Stormfather and the leader of the Knights Radiant. He Ascended to Honor but he chose to break his oaths and he dies while trying to save Gavinor from an Everstorm.
- Adolin Kholin – Dalinar's firstborn son, who is also a nobleman and highly skilled duelist.
- Navani Kholin – An inventor, noblewoman and scholar. She was married to Gavilar until he passed. She later becomes a Bondsmith, after bonding with the Sibling.
- Jasnah Kholin – A scholar and noted atheist who becomes Queen of the nation of Alethkar. She is a member of the Order of Elsecallers, bonded to an inkspren named Ivory.
- Renarin Kholin – Dalinar's second-born son, a nobleman bonded to a corrupted mistspren named Glys, making him a member of the Order of Truthwatchers, as well as giving him the ability to see the future.
- Eshonai – A Listener Shardbearer who is among the first to contact humans. She is later killed by a Highstorm, shortly after understanding the First Ideal.
- Venli – A Listener scholar. She bonds a lightspren named Timbre and becomes a member of the Order of Willshapers.
- Lift – A young thief and member of the Order of Edgedancers. She is bonded to a cultivationspren named Wyndle.
- Rlain – A Listener and former soldier under Kaladin. He bonds a corrupted mistspren named Tumi.
- Moash, later known as Vyre – a talented warrior who becomes a friend of Kaladin, but later betrays him, not being able to forgive the nobles.
- Taravangian – The king of the nation of Kharbranth who was cursed to have his intelligence and empathy to fluctuate massively. He plays a dangerous game with Rayse, apparent arch-villain of the series, and supplants him in this role. He Ascends to Odium and he later absorbs Honor.
- Taln – A Herald who was abandoned by his peers to be tortured for 4500 years; who lost his mind, but never broke.
- Hoid, also known as Wit – An interplanetary traveler who initially appears as a jester, but later proves to be powerful, ancient, and the archenemy of Odium.
- Gavilar – The first King of the Alethi and a powerful warrior.
- Odium – A Shard of emotion, primarily rage, his essence creating the Fused and Voidlight.
- Honor – A Shard of oaths, his essence creating the Heralds and Stormlight

== Setting ==
The Stormlight Archive is set on the planet Roshar in Sanderson's Cosmere universe. The planet's single supercontinent is regularly scoured by "highstorms", extremely powerful thunderstorms which carry a magical substance called Stormlight. Stormlight can be trapped inside gemstones. The devastating effects of the highstorms shape Roshar's ecology, leading to a landscape dominated by bare rock and flora and fauna adapted to withstand the powerful storms.

Prior to the series' beginning, a number of world-spanning wars called Desolations were fought against an enemy called the Voidbringers. Humanity was led in these wars by ten mythical demigod-like warriors called Heralds. The books take place 4,500 years after the final Desolation, where the Heralds claimed the Voidbringers had been defeated forever.

In addition to humans, the planet is inhabited by a humanoid species called singers. At the start of the series, the singers have been stripped of most of their sapience, and live as slaves called "parshmen". Roshar also plays host to a wide variety of spirits called spren. Spren are attracted to emotions and natural phenomena. Some spren, those associated with "higher concepts," are sapient. These spren can form a symbiotic bond with humans, granting them magic powers known as Surgebinding. The Knights Radiant were an order of ancient Surgebinders who fought during the Desolations.

== Plot summary ==
=== The Way of Kings ===
Kaladin is betrayed and enslaved after capturing a Shardblade and Shardplate, respectively a magical sword and armor. He is forced to carry a bridge to allow troops to cross chasms in the face of enemy arrows, and attempts to improve the lives of his bridgemen. He gains magical powers linked to the Knights Radiant. Dalinar attempts to unite his nation's nobility due to a command he hears in visions. Kaladin saves Dalinar and his army from a betrayal, and Dalinar frees him and his men at the cost of Dalinar's Shardblade. Shallan becomes Jasnah's student to steal her Soulcaster, a magical device, but is beset by visions of mysterious spren. After stealing it, Shallan learns it is a fake and Jasnah herself possesses magical abilities.

=== Words of Radiance ===
A countdown (secretly written by Renarin) appears in the Kholin palace. Jasnah betroths Shallan to Adolin and is then assassinated and her ship sunk. Shallan is shipwrecked and forced to use her Lightweaver powers and do spy work to survive. Kaladin commands the Kholin guard and wrestles between loyalty to the Kholins and to Moash, who wants to kill Elhokar Kholin to avenge his family. Kaladin ultimately sides with the Kholins. He also defends Dalinar from Szeth. Dalinar launches a final assault against the Listeners but is defeated when they summon a new storm. Shallan teleports the Kholin army away.

=== Oathbringer ===
Those teleported away from the battle find themselves in the lost city of Urithiru, which contains portals to cities across the continent. The new storm liberates the parshmen, transforming some of them into Fused, servants of Odium. Jasnah is revealed to have survived by using her Radiant powers to escape into the alternate dimension of Shadesmar. Moash joins the Fused and earns their trust. Kaladin, Adolin, Shallan, and King Elhokar infiltrate a city to save the King's family, but Elhokar is killed by Moash, though his son Gavinor is rescued. Szeth joins the Skybreakers and is given a sapient sword. Odium attempts to recruit Dalinar, but he refuses, leading to a battle.

=== Rhythm of War ===
Adolin, Shallan, and several others embark into Shadesmar to convince the honorspren to allow for the creation of more Windrunners. The honorspren instead put them on trial for the sins of humanity. Shallan is revealed to have previously bonded and killed another spren, but they are saved by the testimony of the seemingly-dead spren of Adolin's Shardblade. Urithiru is inflitrated by the Fused. Kaladin fights against the Fused to protect the Sibling, the spren of Urithiru. Navani is forced to do research for the Fused until she bonds the Sibling and she and Kaladin liberate Urithiru. Dalinar and Odium negotiate an end to the war with a contest of champions to take place in ten days. Taravangian takes up the power of Odium, but remains bound to the deal.

=== Wind and Truth ===
Before the contest of champions, both sides scramble to control territory before the war ends. Kaladin and Szeth journey to Szeth's homeland. Dalinar and Navani journey into the Spiritual Realm to find more information about Odium. Shallan, Renarin, and Rlain are also in the Spiritual Realm, searching for the powerful spren Ba-Ado-Mishram. Adolin defends Azimir from Odium, as does Jasnah in Thaylenah. Jasnah fails as Odium convinces the city to join him. The contest of champions begins, and when Odium selects Gavinor as his champion, Dalinar finds himself unable to kill him. Instead, Dalinar frees Odium and goads him to absorb the power of the god Honor and become Retribution. Dalinar dies saving Gavinor, but Retribution is forced to hide from other Shards. Kaladin becomes a Herald, reforging an ancient pact to protect the spren from Retribution.

== Reception ==
=== Critical response and sales ===
==== The Way of Kings ====
In its first week of release The Way of Kings was No. 7 on The New York Times Best Seller list.

An early review from the website Unshelved gave The Way of Kings a positive review. A review from Elitist Book Reviews pointed out small problems with the book, such as too much exposition, but gave an overall positive opinion of the book. The website SFReviews.net gave the book a mixed review, praising Sanderson's writing and creativity, but criticizing its extreme length and overall dearth of action.

SF Reviews pointed out, "The ride is luxurious, the scenery is often breathtaking, but The Way of Kings is truly a long and winding road." KeepingTheDoor.com commented, "The Stormlight Archive is a series that, like Robert Jordan's The Wheel of Time, George R. R. Martin's A Song of Ice and Fire and Robin Hobb's The Realm of the Elderlings epics, every fantasy fan worth their salt must read and be familiar with. This will be one of the giant series that will help shape the entire scene. Take a week off work now and go and buy The Way of Kings. You won't regret it."

==== Words of Radiance ====
In its first week of release, Words of Radiance debuted at No. 1 on The New York Times Hardcover Fiction Best Seller list.

A review written by io9 called the book, "an old-school, '90s fantasy-style behemoth", also commenting, "While Sanderson continues to build his characters and reveal who they are (especially in the case of Shallan's past) it still clings to one overarching plot that drives relentlessly to an ending that can only be described as 'epic'."

Another review published by Tor Books commented, "Words of Radiance capitalizes on the groundwork provided by The Way of Kings, building up the world and system while revealing many more potential points of speculation." It also said, "So to you, lucky reader, who have the choice of whether or not to buy the book, I give this advice. The journey will be worth it. Yes, you should buy this book. Yes, this is a series worth following to the end. I'm glad to be taking this journey, and I hope you will as well."

==== Oathbringer ====
Similar to its predecessor, Oathbringer debuted at No. 1 on The New York Times Hardcover Fiction Bestseller list.

In a review for The A.V. Club, Samantha Nelson commented that "Oathbringer shows that Sanderson's story might not be powerful enough to last the 10 books the author has planned. The book does have some surprises, with heroic deeds not always going as well as planned, and there's a lot of great humor", concluding that "Sanderson needs to keep things fresh if their battle is going to be worth continuing."

Aidan Moher for Barnes & Noble said, in a more positive review, that "Three volumes deep into the Stormlight Archive, Sanderson continues to deliver on every promise the genre has ever made. It's got a ton of action and warfare and it adds new layers to his trademark magic systems."

==== Rhythm of War ====
Rhythm of War, like the previous two novels in the series, debuted at No. 1 on The New York Times Hardcover Fiction Bestseller list.

Joshua S Hill of Fantasy Book Review gave the book a 4/10, stating that "Rhythm of War was more of a slog than it needed to be", going on to state that "Not only does this book bring with it any of the normal difficulties with reviewing one book in the middle of a much longer series, or such a lengthy book as this (1,220 pages), but Sanderson is quite obviously positioning 'The Stormlight Archive' as the great magnum opus of his career and, therefore, the foundational connection upon which all other 'Cosmere' books hinge."

In a more positive review, Bill Capossere of Fantasy Literature gave Rhythm of War four out of five stars, stating, "Rhythm of War is absolutely a fun read, an interesting read, mostly a compelling read despite some bogging down here and there." He went on to state that "It's not my favorite book in the series (that would be Words of Radiance), but Sanderson, besides being amazingly prolific, is also amazingly consistent, almost always falling for me in the 4 to 4.5 range."

=== Awards and nominations ===
| Year | Novel | Award | Category | Result | Ref |
|---|---|---|---|---|---|
| 2010 | The Way of Kings | Whitney Awards | Best Novel of the Year | Won | |
| 2010 | The Way of Kings | Whitney Awards | Best Speculative Fiction | Won | |
| 2010 | The Way of Kings | Goodreads Choice Awards | Best Fantasy Novel | Nominated | |
| 2011 | The Way of Kings | David Gemmell Legend Award | Best Novel | Won | |
| 2011 | The Way of Kings | Locus Awards | Best Fantasy Novel | Nominated | |
| 2014 | Words of Radiance | Whitney Awards | Best Speculative Fiction | Won | |
| 2014 | Words of Radiance | Goodreads Choice Awards | Best Fantasy Novel | Nominated | |
| 2015 | Words of Radiance | Audie Award | Best Fantasy (audiobook) | Won | |
| 2015 | Words of Radiance | Locus Awards | Best Fantasy Novel | Nominated | |
| 2015 | Words of Radiance | David Gemmell Legend Award | Best Novel | Won | |
| 2015 | Words of Radiance | David Gemmell Legend Award | Cover art | Won | |
| 2017 | Oathbringer | Goodreads Choice Awards | Best Fantasy Novel | Nominated | |
| 2018 | Oathbringer | David Gemmell Legend Award | Best Novel | Nominated | |
| 2018 | Oathbringer | David Gemmell Legend Award | Cover art | Nominated | |
| 2018 | Oathbringer | BookNest Fantasy Awards | Best Traditional Publisher Novel | Nominated | |
| 2020 | Rhythm of War | Goodreads Choice Awards | Best Fantasy Novel | Nominated | |
| 2020 | Rhythm of War | BookNest Fantasy Awards | Best Traditional Publisher Novel | Nominated | |

== Adaptations ==
=== Audiobooks ===
Unabridged audiobook versions of the first five books, read by narrator team Kate Reading and Michael Kramer, were released by Macmillan Audio. The Way of Kings was released in August 2010, Words of Radiance in March 2014, Oathbringer in November 2017, Rhythm of War in November 2020, and Wind and Truth in December 2024. The novella Edgedancer, narrated by Kate Reading and published by Recorded Books, was released in October 2022. The novella Dawnshard, narrated by Kate Reading and Michael Kramer and published by Recorded Books, was released in August 2022.

GraphicAudio has published a dramatized adaptation of every Stormlight Archive novel and novella to date. Their five-part version of The Way of Kings was released between March 2016 and July 2016; a five-part version of Words of Radiance from September 2016 to January 2017; a six-part version of Oathbringer from April 2018 to September 2018; a six-part version of Rhythm of War from December 2020 to December 2021; and a five-part version of Wind and Truth starting in June 2025 and finishing with part five in March 2026. GraphicAudio also published a version of the Stormlight Archive novella Edgedancer in December 2018. Uniquely, the Dawnshard novella was released on 26 November 2024 in both stereo audio (available for purchase on GraphicAudio's web store) and in Dolby Atmos format, available exclusively from Audible.

=== Films / TV series ===
In October 2016, the rights to the entire Cosmere universe were licensed by DMG Entertainment which was working on an adaptation of The Way of Kings. Patrick Melton and Marcus Dunstan were hired as screenwriters. DMG founder Dan Mintz was to produce the film, with Sanderson and Joshua Bilmes serving as executive producers. In 2016, DMG also intended on simultaneously adapting the first book in Sanderson's Mistborn series.

In January 2026, it was announced that Apple TV had secured the rights for Sanderson's entire Cosmere universe, and that The Stormlight Archive in particular would be adapted as a TV series.

=== Video games ===
A VR game, The Way of Kings: Escape the Shattered Plains, developed by Arcturus VR, was released on March 2, 2018.

A popular mod for the grand strategy game Crusader Kings III, based in the world of Roshar and named after the first book, was published in 2020.

=== Board game ===
A stand-alone expansion to the board game Call to Adventure, based on the series, was released in 2020.

=== Tabletop roleplaying game ===
The Cosmere Roleplaying Game, a tabletop roleplaying game based on the Cosmere universe, was released in 2025. It raised more than $15 million on Kickstarter, making it the RPG with the highest funding on the platform at the time.

=== Picture books ===
Four of Hoid's short stories will be adapted into picture books by Dragonsteel. Three of these were initially presented within the main Stormlight texts and are expanded by Sanderson. The fourth story, Chasmfriends Get a Pet!, originates from the 2024 Story Deck and was co-written by Dan Wells. The Backerkit campaign to print these began on March 6, 2026.
