= Wind and Truth =

Novel by Brandon Sanderson

- First edition book cover
- Author: Brandon Sanderson
- Cover artist: Michael Whelan
- Language: English
- Series: The Stormlight Archive
- Release number: 5
- Genre: Epic fantasy
- Publisher: Tor Books
- Publication date: December 6, 2024
- Publication place: United States
- Media type: Print (hardcover and paperback), audiobook, e-book
- Pages: 1344
- Preceded by: Rhythm of War

Wind and Truth is an epic fantasy novel written by American author Brandon Sanderson and is the fifth book in The Stormlight Archive series. It was published on December 6, 2024, and is the ending to the first half of the series. Sanderson has said that the latter half of the series will be written after he finishes writing the upcoming Era Three Mistborn trilogy and the two Elantris sequels, and he projects a completion date near the end of 2031.

As with Kaladin in The Way of Kings, Shallan in Words of Radiance, Dalinar in Oathbringer and the characters Eshonai and Venli in Rhythm of War, Wind and Truth contains a sequence of flashback chapters, this time from the perspective of Szeth, the Assassin in White.

The unabridged audiobook is read by narration team Michael Kramer and Kate Reading.

== Development ==
The writing process for the book started in January 2022. The book was known under the working title Knights of Wind and Truth before Sanderson decided on Wind and Truth. In December 2023 Sanderson announced the completion of the first draft of the novel, which was later followed by the announcement of the publication date by his publisher Tor Books.

The synopsis of Wind and Truth that came with the announcement is as follows:

Dalinar Kholin has challenged the evil god Odium to a contest of champions, and the Knights Radiant and the nations of Roshar have a mere 10 days to prepare for the worst. The fate of the entire world - and the Cosmere at large - hangs in the balance.

Sanderson has stated that Dalinar Kholin would have a larger role in the book than he had in Rhythm of War. The planned ending of the novel is based upon the ending he planned out for an RPG in 1999, and has been in the outline of the series from the start. Sanderson hopes that it will land right with people and recontextualize many important moments in the story.

On June 4, 2024, Sanderson announced on his Twitter account that he had finished the last part of the novel, turning the book in at 491,000 words; this made Wind and Truth the longest book in the series.

Sanderson calls writing The Stormlight Archive novels "quite draining" and stated he would take a break from the project for a time while he works on sequels to Mistborn and Elantris. Sanderson's next projected release for part two of The Stormlight Archive story arc is 2031.

== Plot ==
Prologue

Seven and a half years ago, King Gavilar sought immortality after bonding with the Stormfather. Upon learning of his arrogant nature, the Stormfather severed his bond with Gavilar, which led chronologically to Szeth's assassination.

Day One

Dalinar challenges Odium for the Contest of Champions, which may end the war. Kaladin and his Honorspren Sylphrena depart for Shinovar, seeking the Herald Ishar, who Dalinar hopes can aid him in restoring the Oathpact after Jezrien's death. Szeth joins Kaladin on his journey to Shinovar to fulfill his 4th ideal, which is the cleansing of Shinovar. They arrive at Azir and await the Highstorm. Shallan and Adolin plan to return to Urithiru. Shallan learns that Ba-Ado-Mishram had been imprisoned within the spiritual realm, and that the Ghostbloods are seeking power through Ba-Ado-Mishram. Shallan decides to thwart the Ghostbloods' plan. Shallan and Adolin discover an army of Singers preparing to attack Azimir. They meet up with Kaladin at Azir and return to Urithiru. Odium, with Taravangian as his vessel, arrives at Tu Bayla and witnesses the outcome of the battle.

Day Two

Adolin and Shallan return to Urithiru and part ways. Shallan goes to Narak, where the Ghostbloods have fled the tower. Adolin reports the threat at Azimir to his father. Cultivation reveals to Dalinar that Honor's power is hidden in the spiritual realm. Wit learns that loopholes had been inserted into the contract, allowing entire countries to be captured via their capitals, violating Rayse's promise not to exploit the wording of the contract. Jasnah departs to Thaylenah to aid Fen, Sigzil leads Bridge Four at the Shattered Plains, and Adolin departs to Azir to hold off Odium's forces. Dalinar and Navani open a portal that allows them access to the spiritual realm. Shallan arrives at Narak and learns that a former ally has captured Kalak. Mraize and Iyatil fled to Shadesmar and Sja-anat's spren using an Anti-Stormlight weapon. Shallan returns to Urithiru and seeks aid from Renarin and Rlain to stop the Ghostbloods. Shallan's group of Lightweavers and the Ghostbloods arrive at the spot where Dalinar and Navani open the perpendicularity. Mraize tosses the Anti-Stormlight dagger into the portal, breaking the perpendicularity, causing the portal to shut closed.

Kaladin and Szeth arrive at Shinovar. Szeth reveals that an Unmade, known as the Voice, has corrupted his people, and the Honorblades are kept within the monasteries after the Heralds abandoned their Oathpact. Ishar approaches Kaladin and Syl and tasks Kaladin with helping Szeth restore his homeland. El permanently destroys Jezrien's soul. Odium offers him to conquer the Shatter Plains and plans to unleash Dai-Gonarthis to ravage Dalinar's troops. He meets up with Cultivation and observes all the deities across the Cosmere before parting ways.

Day Three

Kaladin and Szeth arrive at Stoneward monastery and encounter a corrupted stone shaman, Rit-Daughter-Clutio, carrying Taln's Honorblade (which was swapped years ago before Taln arrived at the Shattered Plains). Szeth kills Rit and recovers Taln's blade, realizing Ishar's plan to lure him to Shinovar. After rescuing the civilians, they head to Kalak's monastery.

In Azimir, Adolin prepares for the first wave of Odium's forces at the Oathgate and chooses not to engage in the battle as he observes the Azish military, led by Commandant Zarb Kushkam, successfully banishing the first wave. Upon celebrating, Maya, who is slowly recovering from her Deadeye state, decides to travel to Shadesmar and persuades the Honorspren to join the fight, leaving Adolin to fend for himself without the Shardblade.

After his encounter with El, Odium teleports to Kharbranth and persuades Dova, who was revealed as Battar the Herald of Honor, to make an offer to travel off-world as his steward.

Day Four

Kaladin and Szeth settle at the riverbank near Koring after recovering Kalak's Honorblade from the deceased Stone Shaman, Sivi. At night, while Kaladin performs a Kata, Szeth is transported into Shadesmar and encounters his former master and wielder of Battar's Honorblade - the Elsecaller, Pozen-Son-Nash, along with the Edgedancer assassin wielding Vedel's Honorblade. Unable to summon his Shardblade, Szeth quickly outmaneuvers the assassin upon sensing Nightblood, his sword, calling to him. Szeth manages to recover Nightblood and kill the assassin, and Pozen kills himself, trapping Szeth in Shadesmar. However, Szeth uses the Honorblade and escapes, recovering two Honorblades.

While being stranded in the spiritual realm, Dalinar and Navani arrive at the time of ancient Shinovar when humanity first arrives on Roshar after leaving their devastated home planet, Ashyn. Dalinar and Navani encounter an ancient spren known as the Wind, who serves as the guide to achieve their goal. With the Stormfather refusing to aid, Navani manages to bond with the herald Shalash's ribbon, which causes the visions to alter. Shallan, Rlain, and Renarin enter the spiritual realm, arriving at the same time as Dalinar and Navani, but choose to remain hidden to stop Mraize and Iyatil from finding the Unmade. Shallan realizes that her persona, Formless, appears when she tries to thwart Mraize. Meanwhile, in Azir, Adolin struggles to fend off Odium's troops while befriending Yanagawn, the Azish emperor, and teaching him battle tactics.

Odium approaches a blind Moash and gives him crystalline spikes through his eyes that allow him to see Sprens and Investiture. Odium then visits Kharbranth, believing his only success in protecting his family is war.

Day Five

After bonding with illusionary Shalash's ribbon and Nale's promissory disk as anchors, Dalinar and Navani, along with Elokhar's son Gavinor, who entered the realm by accident, enter the vision between the First Desolation and the Heraldic epochs when the early Singers travel eastward, humanity declaring war against Odium that lasted forty-three years, and Honor supporting humanity over Singers. With Honor's aid, Jezerien establishes a group of ten people, consisting of five men and five women, who possess Vedel's abilities to grant immortality and Ishar's Bondsmithing surges, declaring themselves the protectors of humanity known as the Heralds. Dalinar, under the guise of Kalak, manages to bond Kalak's Honorblade to alter the vision.

Meanwhile, on the Shattered Plains, Sigzil forms his tactical approach of building four impenetrable fortresses on Narak to divert and stall Odium's forces. As the army approaches with the Everstorm, Sigzil leads the army to triumph as he kills a newly formed Fused and overpowers a Thunderclast, causing Odium's forces to retreat. Suspicious, Sigzil and a few scouts follow them only to learn that the army has created an Elsecaller portal for reinforcement, with the Unmade and Moash approaching. After her reconciliation with her tribe, Venli realizes that Leshwi and her followers have lost their powers after betraying Odium, and grows curious about Chasmfiends who have bonded with the Listeners. As the Highstorm arrives, the Chasmfiends form a murmuration, and Venli uses her Willshaper abilities to contact the Stone, revealing that Honor had turned against the Singers centuries ago, and the answers she seeks lie within her hometown of Narak.

Renarin and Rlain form an intimate relationship before witnessing the event of the Heralds' declaration, after which Renarin chooses to remain hidden from Dalinar and Navani under the guise of Vedel. He discovers Shallan is Ash in disguise, who tries to find Mraize, unaware that he, in turn, was posing as Honor. As Mraize makes an attack, Shallan overpowers him and realizes that Odium fears Ba Ado Mishram. Formless suddenly appears to taunt Shallan, allowing an injured Mraize to escape. In Azir, Adolin gains support from the newly arrived Honorspren Notum.

Kaladin and Szeth take a hike to the Elsecaller Monastery to investigate, only to find out that the town is deserted. Kaladin learns that this town was Szeth's childhood home. As they leave, the Herald Nale approaches them and decides to accompany them on Szeth's pilgrimage.

Feeling conflicted about his balance, Odium continues to follow Taravangian's view of conquest and accept his alignment, transforming into a new form that resembles his former predecessor, causing Cultivation to leave in disappointment.

Day Six

Kaladin, Szeth, and Nale travel to the Lightweaver monastery to retrieve Shalash's Honorblade. With Kaladin and Nale debating over moral circumstance on supporting Szeth, Szeth goes into the monastery alone to confront the Stone Shaman, Moss-son-Farrier. However, Moss creates thirty illusions of Shalash on hostages and gives Szeth an ultimatum to solve his puzzle. With Sylphrena's aid, Szeth manages to kill Moss and recover the Honorblade. After Kaladin kills the Truthwater Honorbearer while defending Szeth, which Nale sees as breaking Szeth's loyalty of pilgrimage, Nale informs them that Odium has corrupted Jezrien's Honorblade. The trio plans to visit the Truthwatcher monastery to investigate after recovering Pralla's Honorblade.

Jasnah settles into Thaylen city to observe the city's defenses for the upcoming battle and grows suspicious of the threat; she sends Windrunner scouts to investigate. Sigzil commands his armies to retreat to Narak Two after losing Narak One as Odium's forces and Unmade overwhelm them.

After recovering from her encounter with Formless, Shallan, along with Renarin and Rlain, continues their search for the Unmade. Upon noticing the dark influence close by, Shallan finds the illusion of Mishram during the Recreance era and discovers that the Unmade is supporting the Singers. The Unmade senses her presence until Rlain and the Mistsprens protect her; Mraize stands by watching them before Odium begins observing the spiritual realm. After discussing Yanagawn, Adolin learns that Emul and Tashikk defected from Azimir and are supporting Odium, who plans to isolate Azimir from gaining an alliance.

After losing the illusioned Honorblade, Dalinar enters the vision of the Last Desolation; he learns that Honor had abandoned humanity and the Heralds are broken, forcing them to abandon Taln and their post, keeping Odium imprisoned on planet Braize. Navani and Gavinor arrive just as Dalinar witnesses the Herald's departure. With only four days left, they require an anchor that speeds up time, and discover that the Stormfather is the anchor. As Dalinar bonds with the Stormfather, the Stormfather threatens to sever his ties with Dalinar. After bonding the anchor, the vision sends the trio to Urithru before the Era of Recreance occurred; Dalinar confirms that the False Desolation takes place before Honor's death upon noticing the Windrunner Ririan from Feverstone that he saw in his previous visions.

Cultivation sends her agents to attack Kharbranth and persuade Odium to surrender. Driven mad by grief, passion, and desire, Odium summons his powers and destroys Kharbranth, in the process killing all of Taravagian's family, supporters, and residents. Horrified by his response, Cultivation surrenders.

Day Seven

In Azir, Odium's forces summon the Thunderclast to attack the dome, which creates a diversion. Adolin is injured after his fight with the Thunderclast and has lost his Shardplate. Commandant Kushkam manages to use fire bomb attacks and stop the army successfully. After receiving news from the scouts, Jasnah confirms her suspicion that Odium's forces are forming a distraction, making her troops protect Thaylen city, and decides to reassign troops to support the Shattered Plains. After losing Narak Three, Sigzil struggles to fend off the army to prevent their siege on Narak Two and Narak Prime; Moash overpowers the entire troops of Bridge Four with Anti-Stormlight at the north post and kills Leyten, Sigzil's closest friend.

Shallan, Rlain, and Renarin fall into the vision of their past created by Ba-Ado-Mishram to lure them to her prison. Renarian can resist Mishram's illusions upon discovering the Unmade's resentment towards humanity and singers. Dalinar and Navani learn that humanity had deserted Urithiru after the Order of the Radiants caused a schism following the Heralds' departure and the False Desolation. Navani manages to contact the Sibling upon learning that Windrunner Ririan named Garith is hiding secrets after he argued with the Bondsmith Meleshi and former Skybreakers. During the false Desolation, they followed Garith and soon discovered that he had an intimate relationship with the Direform Listener Shnome. Upon their secret meeting, they both plan to forge a peace agreement between the Listeners and humans with Mishram to end the conflict. However, Honor and Melishi betray the couple by imprisoning Ba-Ado-Mishram inside a gem and thus transforming the Listeners into their primitive and weakened state. Honor then shows the Radiants a vision of a potential future where they will destroy Roshar. Honor's actions in betraying humanity, weakening the Listeners, and imprisoning the Unmade cause the entire Knight Radiants to abandon their oaths, which directly leads to the Era of Recreance, by which Stormfather reveals himself as Honor's cognitive shadow. After the revelation of Honor's betrayal, Odium approaches Dalinar and Navani in the spiritual realm.

After giving Szeth and his Highspren, 12124, some therapy advice, Kaladin is contacted by the Wind, who pleads with him to help restore the Heralds' mental state. The trio notices the monasteries are lit from a distance.

Day Eight

Odium controls the spiritual realm as he separates Dalinar from Navani and Gavinor to torture Dalinar with his own past. Dalinar manages to resist Odium's influence and, through his bond with the Stormfather, escapes Odium's grasp. Kaladin, Szeth, and Nale arrive at the Dustbringer Monastery to recover Chana's honorblade, only to learn that Szeth's sister, Elid, had become the Honorbearer. Refusing to fight his own sister, Szeth chooses to reconcile with Elid before she succumbs to death from the Unmade influence. Nale reveals that he and Ishar chose Szeth to become a Herald to restore the Oathpact and take Jezrien's place. Venli and the Listeners arrive at the central plateau beneath the battlefield of Narak. She discovers a hidden golden pool of light - Odium's well of power. However, El's forces spot them.

As Shallan and her Cryptic sprens confront her past, she discovers that her mother is Chanarach, the Herald of the Common Man. It is revealed that Nale ordered Chana to kill her daughter during Shallan's bonding with Testament. Shallan realized that Chana, being a herald, had survived and gone into hiding in Braize to avoid harming her own daughter. Shallan manages to confront Chana and forgive her before searching for the Unmade.

In Urithiru, Lift manages to rescue Zahel, who was held captive by the Ghostbloods.

Day Nine

With Taravanigan's agents by his side, Odium manages to overpower the coalition with sheer cunning and political schemes. He won an argument with Jasnah on the topic of protecting Thaylenah by exploiting the contract that focuses on Alethkar and Herdaz, which causes Fen to switch allegiance with him. After renouncing his oath to defend his spren, Sigzil and his Bridge Four army lose the Shattered Plains to overwhelming forces, while Venli uses the Chasmfiends to storm Narak Prime as planned. Adolin, with his leg amputated, loses Azimir when Odium's forces outnumber them as they enter the Oathgate. Shallan finds Mraize and realizes Iyatil is on her path to finding the prison while distracting Shallan. Reunited after being separated, Rlain and Renearin decide to spend their lives together after seeing the possible future. With the Siblings' help, Navani and Gavinor manage to escape the spiritual realm of Odium using the illusioned Kholinar Oathgate to return to Urithiru in the Physical Realm.

Kaladin and Szeth arrive at the Skybreaker monastery to confront Nale. With Szeth refusing to fight the Herald, Kaladin steps in as a challenger to duel with Nale. When the Wind summons the music, Kaladin retells Wit's story to remind Nale of his past, causing the Herald to succumb to his emotions. Upon realising his misdeeds, Nale surrenders his Honorblade and reveals that Ishar is responsible for corrupting Shinovar, impersonating as the mysterious Voice from Szeth's past. Nale explains that Ishar had discovered Odium's Wells of Power from Narak and taken some of his power to relocate Honor's perpendicularity, in which he sought new ways to fight Odium by recruiting a replaceable Herald. However, Ishar was later corrupted by Odium's influence, which drove him into madness and his ongoing tyranny in Tukar. The group decides to go to the Bondsmith monastery to confront Ishar.

Day Ten

With the deadline approaching, Adolin and his allies realize that they must hold Azish's throne while holding against Odium's forces. The group enters the Azimir palace and finds that the fused leader, Abidi the Monarch, wearing Adolin's Shardplate, has set up the aluminum trap to challenge Adolin to a duel. Adolin holds his own and manages to recover his shardplate, winning the duel against Abidi the Monarch. Maya returns, having recruited the Deadeyes to join the fight against Odium's forces until the contest begins. With the Shattered Plains recovered, Venli reveals to El that the humans had signed a peace treaty to create a sovereign nation, which ended the conflict.

Shallan, Rlain, and Renarin find Mishram's gemstone prison. Shallan realizes Mraize has followed them and confronts him, leaving Rlain and Renarin to observe the Unmade. Using the anti-stormlight dagger, Shallan kills Iyatil in disguise as her persona and ends Mraize's life with her illusion ability. Rlain and Renarin manage to free Mishram, which causes the Unmade to transport them to Shadesmar. Shallan returns the corrupted sprens to Sja-Anat.

Kaladin, Szeth, and Nale arrive at the Bondsmith monastery, where Ishar awaits them. With the Honorblades in place, Ishar summons the corrupted Honorbearers, resurrected as Fused. Having spoken his Fifth Ideal, Szeth refuses to fight them with Skybreaker abilities, realizing he is being used without making his own choice. Szeth renounces his Skybreaker oath and chooses to fight them with Nightblood to sever their immortality. Outraged by Szeth's decision, Ishar began suppressing them with Odium's power, feeding them with shame and lies. Kaladin, having experience rejecting the lies and shame that Ishar is trying to smother them with, manages to resist Ishar and speak the Fifth Ideal, which overpowers the Herald and severs Odium's influence with Nightblood. With Ishar recovered from corruption, Szeth continues his pilgrimage with Nightblood and kills off the Fused Honorbearers, including his father and his sister. Kaladin discovers that he can use the surge of power from speaking the ideal to fuel Nightblood, but even that begins to run out. Nightblood starts to consume Szeth, eventually taking his right arm and some of Kaladin's fingers.

Dalinar returns to the Physical Realm after learning much of Tanavast's history and the cause of his death. After bidding his farewell to Navani, Dalinar arrives at the rooftop of Urithriu to confront Odium. Odium summons an adult Gavinor as his champion to challenge Dalinar, revealing that he had trapped Gavinor in the spiritual realm for twenty years, training him to despise Dalinar, and had created a fake version to trick Navani. Odium intends to present Dalinar with a difficult choice: kill Gavinor or let Odium win. Dalinar approaches Honor's power and speaks his words, becoming Honor's new vessel. During the confrontation, the vision then approaches Dalinar, where he meets Nohadon, the author of The Way of Kings, which makes him realize that defeating Odium can lead to planetary destruction, as it is rooted in Tanavast's past. Dalinar acknowledges that Honor needs more time to grow and learn from its flaws, which he gives up Honor's power by renouncing his oath, which leads to the Stormfather's death. Odium then absorbs Honor's power and ascends as a new form of Shard named Retribution. Back on the tower, Dalinar dies saving Gavinor from the effects of the Everstorm and Retribution's ascension.

Roshar enters a new era known as the Night of Sorrows, where Retribution becomes a significant threat to the entire Cosmere, which causes Cultivation to flee in exile. Without the Stormfather's presence, Retribution withdraws all Stormlight from the world, allowing the Everstorm to consume the highstorm, isolating Roshar from Cosmere through a time dilation. After sensing Retribution's threat, The Wind inspires Ishar to bind Retribution from killing the Spren by forging an Oathpact. With Szeth badly injured by the Nightblood and unable to fulfill his role, Kaladin steps in and takes his role as Jezrien's replacement, ascending as the new Herald of Kings. Instead of facing torture on Braize, Kaladin and the other Heralds can transfer their minds into a paradisical vision to help recover their sanity. Szeth awakens from consciousness, learns that Kaladin and the heralds are gone, and decides to continue his quest to find the Skybreaker dissenters.

With the Radiants remaining active in Urithiru as a result of Navani encased in a crystal by Sibling, Renarin takes the lead on stabilizing the Alethi politics, refusing to take his father's place as king, as Jasnah acknowledges her hypocrisy as Alethi Queen upon receiving Wit's last note. Wit, fearing Retribution, approaches Sigzil and gives him the dawnshard that he had been carrying, tasking him with protecting it until he can return. Retribution shortly arrives and vaporizes Wit. Sigzil departs Roshar to protect the Dawnshard and meets Szeth's Highspren on the road within Shadesmar. A day after the contest, Venli discovers that the Well of Power has altered, which signifies Retribution's offering to the Listeners. A few months after the contest, Adolin, having mourned his father's death, forms the Unoathed group to continue protecting Azir and other territories. With stormlight gone, the Oathgates are non-functional, leaving Shallan stranded in Shadesmar. She determines to contact Adolin with an Elantrian Seon she borrowed from the Ghostbloods while facing other challenges ahead. Despite his victory, Retribution feels thwarted by Dalinar's plan, which involved withdrawing the territories he sought to conquer and entering the spiritual realm with his followers, thereby isolating himself from the other Shards who seek to destroy him.

Epilogue

After being revived by Ulaam, Hoid travels to planet Scadrial to seek help in saving Roshar, through which he hoped to find the shard Valor.

Postlude

Kalak awakens from consciousness after the Oathpact reforged and encounters Kaladin lending a hand for recovery along with other Heralds in hopes of defeating Retribution.

== Viewpoint characters ==
The primary chapters of the book are told from the viewpoints of several major characters, while the book's interludes are narrated from the perspectives of other characters (not all of whom are recurring).

There are a variety of major Viewpoints, each with different plotlines involved

- Kaladin and Szeth in Shinovar to recover the Honorblades
- Shallan, Rlain, and Renarin in the Spiritual Realm searching for Ba-Ado-Mishram
- Dalinar and Navani in the Spiritual Realm are experiencing visions of the past
- Adolin holding out a war in Azimir against Odium's forces
- Sigzil and Venli are fighting for the Shattered Plains
- Jasnah in Thaylenah to form a defense
- Odium, who plays his role as the final antagonist of the entire series

== Pre-publication content ==
- In March 2022, Sanderson did a reading of the first draft of the prologue on his YouTube channel.
- At FanX in 2022, Sanderson did a reading of the first part of Kaladin's first chapter from the first draft of the novel.
- At New York Comic Con in 2022, Sanderson did a reading of the first draft of Szeth's first chapter.
- During Dragonsteel 2022, Sanderson did a reading of the remainder of Kaladin's first chapter as well as his second chapter.
- Also during Dragonsteel 2022, Sanderson did a reading of Szeth's third flashback chapter.
- At Tampa Bay Comic in 2023, Sanderson read from a Jasnah chapter.
- During Dragonsteel 2023, Sanderson did a reading of an interlude.
- At C2E2 in 2024, Sanderson did a reading of the first two Shallan chapters.
- Starting at July 29, 2024, two chapters of the finished book were released each week for free until the book's full release in December.

== Audiobook ==
The unabridged audiobook version of the book was released by Macmillan Audio on the same day as the hardcover version and is read by narrator team Michael Kramer and Kate Reading, who also read The Way of Kings, Words of Radiance, Oathbringer, Rhythm of War and several other books written by Sanderson.

A 5-part GraphicAudio version (dramatized adaptation) of Wind and Truth was released between June 2025 and March 2026:

Wind and Truth [Dramatized Adaptation]
Part	Publication Date	Ref
1	6 June 2025	
2	11 July 2025	
3	15 September 2025	
4	30 December 2025	
5	9 March 2026	
