= Audie Award for Fantasy =

Annual award for fantasy audiobooks

The Audie Award for Fantasy is one of the Audie Awards presented annually by the Audio Publishers Association (APA). It awards excellence in narration, production, and content for a fantasy audiobook released in a given year. It has been awarded since 2012.

== Winners and finalists ==
=== 2010s ===
Year of Release	Title	Author(s)	Narrator(s)	Publisher	Result	Ref.
2012 17th	Daughter of Smoke and Bone (2011)	Laini Taylor	Khristine Hvam	Hachette Audio	Winner	
2012 17th	The Automatic Detective (2008)	A. Lee Martinez	Marc Vietor	Audible	Finalist	
2012 17th	The Land of Laughs (1980)	Jonathan Carroll	Edoardo Ballerini	Audible	Finalist	
2012 17th	Pride and Prejudice and Zombies: Dreadfully Ever After (2011)	Steve Hockensmith	Katherine Kellgren	Audible/Brilliance Audio	Finalist	
2012 17th	Rumo and His Miraculous Adventures (2003)	Walter Moers with John Brownjohn (trans.)	Bronson Pinchot	Blackstone Audio	Finalist	
2013 18th	Anita (1970)	Keith Roberts	Nicola Barber	Audible	Winner	
2013 18th	All Men of Genius (2011)	Lev A. C. Rosen	Emily Gray	Recorded Books	Finalist	
2013 18th	Heroes Die (1998)	Matthew Stover	Stefan Rudnicki	Audible	Finalist	
2013 18th	Princess of Wands (2006)	John Ringo	Suzy Jackson	Audible	Finalist	
2013 18th	The Restorer (2011)	Amanda Stevens	Khristine Hvam	Audible	Finalist	
2013 18th	Theft of Swords (2011)	Michael J. Sullivan	Tim Gerard Reynolds	Recorded Books	Finalist	
2014 19th	Wisp of a Thing (2013)	Alex Bledsoe	Stefan Rudnicki	Blackstone Audio	Winner	
2014 19th	Kill City Blues (2013)	Richard Kadrey	MacLeod Andrews	HarperAudio	Finalist	
2014 19th	The Republic of Thieves (2013)	Scott Lynch	Michael Page	Tantor Audio	Finalist	
2014 19th	The Rithmatist (2013)	Brandon Sanderson	Michael Kramer	Macmillan Audio	Finalist	
2014 19th	Swords of Waar (2012)	Nathan Long	Dina Pearlman	Audible	Finalist	
2015 20th	Words of Radiance (2014)	Brandon Sanderson	Kate Reading and Michael Kramer	Macmillan Audio	Winner	
2015 20th	Cress (2014)	Marissa Meyer	Rebecca Soler	Macmillan Audio	Finalist	
2015 20th	The Emperor's Blades (2014)	Brian Staveley	Simon Vance	Brilliance Audio	Finalist	
2015 20th	Hawk (2014)	Steven Brust	Bernard Setaro Clark	Audible	Finalist	
2015 20th	The Queen of the Tearling (2014)	Erika Johansen	Katherine Kellgren	HarperAudio	Finalist	
2016 21st	Nice Dragons Finish Last (2014)	Rachel Aaron	Vikas Adam	Audible	Winner	
2016 21st	Ascension (2014)	Brian K. Fuller	Simon Vance	Podium Publishing	Finalist	
2016 21st	The Cycle of Arawn (2014)	Edward W. Robertson	Tim Gerard Reynolds	Podium Publishing	Finalist	
2016 21st	The Fifth Season (2015)	N. K. Jemisin	Robin Miles	Hachette Audio	Finalist	
2016 21st	Son of the Black Sword (2015)	Larry Correia	Tim Gerard Reynolds	Audible	Finalist	
2017 22nd	The Hike (2016)	Drew Magary	Christopher Lane	Brilliance Audio	Winner	
2017 22nd	The Bands of Mourning (2016)	Brandon Sanderson	Michael Kramer	Macmillan Audio	Finalist	
2017 22nd	The Black Prism (2010)	Brent Weeks	Simon Vance	Hachette Audio	Finalist	
2017 22nd	The Everything Box (2016)	Richard Kadrey	Oliver Wyman	HarperAudio	Finalist	
2017 22nd	League of Dragons (2016)	Naomi Novik	Simon Vance	Tantor Audio	Finalist	
2018 23rd	The Strange Case of the Alchemist's Daughter (2017)	Theodora Goss	Kate Reading	Simon & Schuster Audio	Winner	
2018 23rd	Red Sister (2017)	Mark Lawrence	Heather O'Neil	Recorded Books	Finalist	
2018 23rd	The Refrigerator Monologues (2017)	Catherynne M. Valente	Karis A. Campbell	HighBridge Audio	Finalist	
2018 23rd	Skullsworn (2017)	Brian Staveley	Elizabeth Knowelden	Brilliance Audio	Finalist	
2018 23rd	Snake Eyes (2016)	John Conroe	James Patrick Cronin	Audible	Finalist	
2018 23rd	Spellmonger (2011)	Terry Mancour	John Lee	Podium Publishing	Finalist	
2019 24th	Spinning Silver (2018)	Naomi Novik	Lisa Flanagan	Penguin Random House Audio	Winner	
2019 24th	European Travel for the Monstrous Gentlewoman (2018)	Theodora Goss		Simon & Schuster Audio	Finalist	
2019 24th	Jade City (2017)	Fonda Lee	Andrew Kishino	Hachette Audio	Finalist	
2019 24th	Kill the Farm Boy (2018)	Kevin Hearne and Delilah S. Dawson	Luke Daniels	Penguin Random House Audio	Finalist	
2019 24th	Second Hand Curses (2017)	Drew Hayes	Scott Aiello, Marc Vietor, and Tavia Gilbert	Audible	Finalist	

=== 2020s ===
Year of Release	Title	Author(s)	Narrator(s)	Publisher	Result	Ref.
2020 25th	The Ten Thousand Doors of January (2019)	Alix E. Harrow	January LaVoy	Hachette Audio	Winner	
2020 25th	Beasts of the Frozen Sun (2019)	Jill Criswell	Alana Kerr-Collins and Tim Campbell	Blackstone Audio	Finalist	
2020 25th	Black Leopard, Red Wolf (2019)	Marlon Jones	Dion Graham	Penguin Random House Audio	Finalist	
2020 25th	Ninth House (2019)	Leigh Bardugo	Michael David Axtell and Lauren Fortgang	Macmillan Audio	Finalist	
2020 25th	Time's Children (2018)	D. B. Jackson	Helen Keeley	Dreamscape	Finalist	
2021 26th	The City We Became (2020)	N. K. Jemisin	Robin Miles	Hachette Audio	Winner	
2021 26th	The House in the Cerulean Sea (2020)	TJ Klune	Daniel Henning	Macmillan Audio	Finalist	
2021 26th	The Invisible Life of Addie LaRue (2020)	V. E. Schwab	Julia Whelan	Macmillan Audio	Finalist	
2021 26th	The Last Smile in Sunder City (2020)	Luke Arnold	Luke Arnold	Hachette Audio	Finalist	
2021 26th	Raybearer (2020)	Jordan Ifueko	Joniece Abbott-Pratt	Blackstone Audio	Finalist	
2022 27th	Rhythm of War (2020)	Brandon Sanderson	Michael Kramer and Kate Reading	Macmillan Audio	Winner	
2022 27th	The Jasmine Throne (2021)	Tasha Suri	Shiromi Arserio	Hachette Audio	Finalist	
2022 27th	Princess Floralinda and the Forty-Flight Tower	Tamsyn Muir	Moira Quirk	Recorded Books	Finalist	
2022 27th	The Sandman: Act II	Neil Gaiman and Dirk Maggs	Neil Gaiman, James McAvoy, Emma Corrin, Brian Cox, Kat Dennings, John Lithgow, Bill Nighy, Regé-Jean Page, and a full cast	Audible Originals	Finalist	
2022 27th	The Witch's Heart	Genevieve Gornichec	Jayne Entwistle	Penguin Random House Audio	Finalist	
2023 28th	The Monsters We Defy	Leslye Penelope	Shayna Small	Hachette Audio	Winner	
2023 28th	The Art of Prophesy	Wesley Chu	Natalie Naudus	Penguin Random House Audio	Finalist	
2023 28th	Cold as Hell	Rhett C. Bruno and Jaime Castle	Roger Clark	Blackstone Audio	Finalist	
2023 28th	Good Omens (1990)	Neil Gaiman and Terry Pratchett	Rebecca Front, Michael Sheen, David Tennant, Katherine Kingsley, Arthur Darvill, Peter Forbes, Gabrielle Glaister, Louis Davison, Pixie Davies, Chris Nelson, Ferdinand Frisby Williams, Adjoa Andoh, Allan Corduner, Kobna Holdbrook-Smith, John Hopkins, Lorelei King, Matt Reeves, and Lemn Sissay	HarperAudio	Finalist	
2023 28th	Legends & Lattes (2022)	Travis Baldree	Travis Baldree	Macmillan Audio	Finalist	
2024 29th	The Dragon Reborn (1991)	Robert Jordan	Rosamund Pike	Macmillan Audio	Winner	
2024 29th	Tread of Angels (2022)	Rebecca Roanhorse	Dion Graham	Simon & Schuster Audio	Finalist	
2024 29th	The God of Endings	Jacqueline Holland	Saskia Maarleveld	Macmillan Audio	Finalist	
2024 29th	Red Rabbit	Alex Grecian	John Pirhalla	Macmillan Audio	Finalist	
2024 29th	Starling House	Alix E. Harrow	Natalie Naudus	Macmillan Audio	Finalist	
2025 30th	Bookshops & Bonedust	Travis Baldree	Travis Baldree	Macmillan Audio	Winner	
2025 30th	Black Shield Maiden	Willow Smith and Jess Hendel	Willow Smith	Penguin Random House Audio	Finalist	
2025 30th	The Bright Sword	Lev Grossman	Nicholas Guy Smith and Lev Grossman	Penguin Random House Audio	Finalist	
2025 30th	Goddess of the River	Vaishnavi Patel	Sneha Mathan	Hachette Audio	Finalist	
2025 30th	Someone You Can Build a Nest In	John Wiswell	Carmen Rose	Tantor Audio	Finalist	
2026 31st	Anima Rising	Christopher Moore	Mary Jane Wells	HarperAudio	Winner	
2026 31st	Bury Our Bones in the Midnight Soil	V. E. Schwab	Marisa Calin, Katie Leung, and Julia Whelan	Macmillan Audio	Finalist	
2026 31st	The Everlasting	Alix E. Harrow	Sid Sagar and Moira Quirk	Macmillan Audio	Finalist	
2026 31st	The Knight and the Moth	Rachel Gillig	Samantha Hydeson	Hachette Audio	Finalist	
2026 31st	A Ruin, Great and Free	Cadwell Turnbull	Dion Graham	Blackstone Publishing	Finalist	
