= The Way of Kings =

2010 novel by Brandon Sanderson

- First edition book cover
- Author: Brandon Sanderson
- Illustrator: Isaac Stewart; Ben McSweeney; Greg Call
- Cover artist: Michael Whelan
- Language: English
- Series: The Stormlight Archive
- Release number: 1
- Genre: Epic fantasy
- Publisher: Tor Books (US), Gollancz (UK)
- Publication date: August 31, 2010
- Publication place: United States
- Media type: Print (hardcover and paperback), audiobook, e-book
- Pages: 1007 (first edition, hardcover)
- ISBN: 978-0-7653-2635-5
- OCLC: 799352269
- Dewey Decimal: 813/.6
- LC Class: PS3619.A533 W375 2010
- Followed by: Words of Radiance

The Way of Kings is an epic fantasy novel written by American author Brandon Sanderson and the first book in The Stormlight Archive series. The novel was published on August 31, 2010, by Tor Books. The Way of Kings consists of one prelude, one prologue, 75 chapters, an epilogue, and nine interludes. It was followed by Words of Radiance in 2014, Oathbringer in 2017, Rhythm of War in 2020 and Wind and Truth in 2024. A leatherbound edition was released in 2021.

The story rotates between the points of view of Kaladin, Shallan Davar, Dalinar Kholin, Adolin Kholin, Szeth-son-son-Vallano, and several other minor characters, who lead seemingly unconnected lives. In 2011, it won the David Gemmell Legend Award for best novel. The unabridged audiobook is read by narrator team Michael Kramer and Kate Reading.

== Setting ==
The backstory of the novel revolves around recurring disasters known as Desolations, where monstrous Voidbringers ravage the world and human survival hangs in the balance. To counter the threat, the Knights Radiant (so named for their glowing aura and eyes) battle the Voidbringers using magical "Shardplate" armor and "Shardblade" swords, as well as magical powers. The most recent Desolation, which occurred thousands of years before the main events of the novel, was believed to be the final one, and has become a subject of myth and legend. The Knights Radiant discarded their armor and swords, which remained on Roshar as priceless heirlooms.

The magic of the world is based on "stormlight" from recurring, hurricane-force magically powered "highstorms." Common gemstones infused with stormlight are used as mundane currency, as well as interior lighting in wealthy houses and palaces. Many artifacts are powered by stormlight, such as one that converts matter into another form, like stone into grain. Nobility is based on eye color, with light colored eyes, such as blue, green, or even purple being seen as the purest royalty due to the association with the Knights Radiant, who had glowing eyes.

The world has flora and fauna that have adapted to the common and extremely powerful highstorms. Most animal life is based on crustaceans, many of which can burrow into the ground to survive a highstorm. Plant life is also mobile, in that it retracts into the ground to survive highstorms. Because highstorms come from the eastern ocean and travel west, the western side of rocks and mountains harbor plant and animal life.

Spirits called spren populate the world and appear in response to the emotions of people and the environment. High wind will have windspren in the form of ribbons of light that flow with the wind and can change their shapes. Suffering from pain will cause red painspren to appear around the wound, and giving a noble, heartfelt speech or completing a hard task will cause gloryspren of golden, twinkling lights in a halo around the head of the performer. Spren are so common that many people pay no attention to them and there are believed to be thousands of types.

== Plot ==
=== Prelude ===
4,500 years ago, ten immortal warriors known as the Heralds were in an ancient agreement to do eternal battle against their greatest enemy, known as the Voidbringers, presumably for the sake of humanity. They would reconstitute into a palace of fire and ruin when they died and would eventually be called to battle again. As the battle ended, Nine Heralds abandoned their agreement and gave up their Honorblades, leaving only a single Herald, Taln, to defend the realm.

=== Prologue ===
So far in the future, the Heralds' battle has been distorted from reality, and the Heralds are now worshipped as gods.

Szeth, a Shin exile cast out by his own people, is sent to assassinate the king of one of the world's most powerful nations, Alethkar. He possesses a Shardblade, a mythical blade that can cut through any material and kill with a touch. He also has access to powers that are no longer available to normal humans, such as manipulating gravity through channeling stormlight.

Szeth confronts and mortally wounds King Gavilar before revealing to the King that the Parshendi, a race of humanoids with mottled red and black skin, sent him. A dying Gavilar gives Szeth a black sphere of unknown use and asks him to send his last regards to his brother Dalinar, which Szeth does. After Szeth flees the scene, Gavilar's son, Elhokar, declares war on the Parshendi for their betrayal.

=== Part One ===
Six years later, Kaladin, a relatively high-station peasant of Alethkar, volunteers to follow his brother Tien, who was drafted, into war to keep him safe. In his third battle, Kaladin's brother is killed, driving Kaladin to become a better fighter and resolving to protect others from the same fate. During a later battle, Kaladin succeeds in killing an enemy Shardbearer and is given the chance to claim the enemy's Shardblade and Shardplate by right. Kaladin denies taking them, instead choosing to give the Shardblade and Shardplate to one of his men. However, he is then betrayed by Lord Amaram, who takes the treasure for himself and brands Kaladin a slave to cover the theft. After numerous escape attempts, Kaladin is sent into service as a Bridgeman - a slave who is forced to carry massive bridges for the Alethi army battling the Parshendi on the Shattered Plains, a biome of vast chasms. The general of this section of the army, Sadeas, uses the bridgemen as bait for the enemy archers. Along the way, Kaladin meets and befriends an amnesiac spren named Sylphrena, who serves as Kaladin's emotional support. Having felt depressed about his past failures, Kaladin decides to cast himself off a cliff to end his life, until Syl convinces him to renew his efforts to protect the Bridgemen.

Meanwhile in Kharbranth, Shallan, a minor light-eyed (highborn) Veden whose family's inheritance is in danger, hatches a scheme to switch a broken Soulcaster (a device that allows the user the power of transmutation) with a working one belonging to Jasnah Kholin, sister of the Alethi King Elhokar. Shallan convinces Jasnah to accept her as her ward.

=== Part Two ===
Dalinar, an fearsome warlord in his youth, starts questioning Alethkar’s warlike and competitive nature. He also begins to experience visions during highstorms, in which he sees the ancient Knights Radiant and receives a cryptic message to unite his allies. His sanity and leadership are questioned by those closest to him.

Kaladin is determined to become the leader of Bridge Four in order to train and protect the bridgemen. He becomes bridgeleader and finds ways of making money to buy additional food and antiseptic for his crew, eventually overcoming their reluctance and fostering camaraderie with them. The bridge crew decides to join Kaladin in training to be faster and stronger with the bridges in hopes of surviving the assaults on the Parshendi.

Szeth finds a new master who knows his capabilities and sends him to assassinate high-ranking nobles around the kingdoms.

=== Part Three ===
After he accidentally ruins a battle by using a creative new bridge tactic, Kaladin is beaten violently and left outside during a highstorm to die under Sadeas' orders. However, he somehow survives and heals rapidly. Kaladin begins to lose hope again, but with Syl's encouragement, he decides to secretly train the bridge crew to fight with the spear.

Shallan grows comfortable as a ward, becoming friends with a young ardent (priest) named Kabsal who eventually begins courting her. Shallan is conflicted between her original plan to save her family by stealing Jasnah's soulcaster, and her growing respect for Jasnah, but eventually makes the switch. Following an assassination attempt by Kabsal, who had been using Shallan to get close to Jasnah, Shallan realizes that both she and Jasnah can Soulcast without a Soulcaster, which is supposed to be impossible.

Szeth arrives at the banquet hall of Jah Keved, successfully defeats the Shardbearers and guards, and assassinates the king.

=== Part Four ===
As a result of his unlikely survival from the Highstorm, Kaladin begins to discover that he possesses abilities that grant him enhanced strength, speed, and healing every time he consumes Stormlight. He experiments and comes to terms with his powers and resolves to do whatever he can to save Bridge Four.

Dalinar and Adolin argue about their decision to focus on the war, Dalinar's visions, and the stability of Alethkar. Dalinar discusses with Sadeas their plans to unite the Highprinces by setting up a trap for the Parshendi at The Tower, the largest plateau in the Shattered Plains, to which Sadeas agrees. Navani, the King's widow and Dalinar's sister in law, confesses her feelings towards Dalinar, and they begin a courtship.

During the Battle of the Tower, Sadeas betrays Dalinar by retreating with his bridges, stranding Dalinar and his troops. Kaladin and his bridge crew remain behind, and Syl, who remembers herself as an Honorspren, pleads with a reluctant Kaladin to save Dalinar. Overcoming his desire to escape with his crew, Kaladin decides to attempt a rescue of Dalinar's army. Kaladin attempts to defend his men from the Parshendi archers, unleashing a surge of Stormlight to lure an entire volley of arrows to his shield, momentarily stunning the Parshendi. Infused with stormlight, he alone charges the Parshendi army and unleashes his abilities. With his powers and Bridge Four's eventual aid, Kaladin defends the bridge giving time for Adolin to cut a path through the Parshendi forces, allowing the Kholin army to retreat.

Dalinar, Adolin, and Kaladin arrive in Sadeas's camp to confront the Highprince over his betrayal. When Sadeas refuses to grant Dalinar the bridgemen, Dalinar trades his Shardblade, Oathbringer, in exchange for the two thousand bridgemen under Sadeas' control. Having grown distrustful of the Highprinces and seeking to unify the nation, Dalinar pressures the king to declare him the Highprince of War and sets forth plans to enforce codes of chivalry to unite the army, earning the ire of the other factions in the king's army.

=== Part Five ===
Jasnah starts to instruct Shallan in Soulcasting and shares her research into the Parshendi. Jasnah and later Shallan believe that the Parshendi have laid waste to humanity in the past, creating the myth of the Voidbringers. Jasnah also reveals the existence of the Ghostbloods, a secret organization searching for the same answers she is, but for different reasons. Kabsal was a member of the Ghostbloods, and Shallan realizes that her father was as well.

In the Shattered Plains, Dalinar appoints Kaladin and the men of Bridge Four to serve him, his family, and the king as bodyguards and appoints Kaladin the captain of the guard. Dalinar resolves further to found anew the Knights Radiant and prepare humanity for a destruction he believes is coming.

Upon arriving at Kharbranth to finish his mission, Szeth learned that Taravangian, the seemingly infirm and rather simple king of Kharbranth, is actually the one who hired him. Taravangian revealed he deliberately added his name to the list to hide suspicion if Szeth was captured. In addition to his schemes on ruling Roshar, Taravangian escorts Szeth to his secret hospital, which uses it as a front for recording "death rattles": small glimpses of the future that sometimes occur as a person dies.

=== Epilogue ===
In Kholinar, Hoid talks to the guards about the importances of timing, while waiting for an event to happen, when suddenly, a dark-eyed Shardbearer breaks through Kholinar's gates, stunning the guards. The Shardbearer identifies himself as the Herald Taln, who was left behind. He announces that the Everstorm is coming before collapsing on the ground. Having witnessed this event, Hoid proclaims that the warning has come too late.

== Characters ==
The primary chapters within the book are told from the viewpoint of several major characters, while the book's interludes are told from the viewpoint of other characters (not all of which repeat). As with each Stormlight Archive book, particular characters are given a series of chapters detailing their backstory; Kaladin's backstory is detailed in The Way of Kings.

- Kaladin is a darkeyed (lower-class) slave from the nation of Alethkar. He is accompanied by a spren named Sylphrena.
- Szeth-son-son-Vallano is an assassin from Shinovar. He refers to himself as a "Truthless", who must serve those who bear his Oathstone.
- Shallan Davar is a minor lighteyes (upper-class) from the nation of Jah Keved. Her family has fallen on hard times after the death of her father. She seeks to be accepted as the ward and student of the renowned scholar Jasnah Kholin, sister to King Elhokar of Alethkar. A skilled artist who can with a single glance remember and recreate a scene with charcoal and paper, she learns that she is able to Soulcast without a Soulcaster, just like Jasnah.
- Dalinar Kholin, a highprince of Alethkar, brother to the slain King Gavilar, and uncle to the current king, nicknamed the Blackthorn. A general who helped unite the kingdom with his brother Gavilar. Dalinar experiences visions during the highstorms, and begins to be criticized as weak after he begins to follow the Codes and referring to war Alethkar is engaged in.
- Adolin Kholin, a lighteyes of Alethkar and heir to his father Dalinar's highprince seat. A skilled duelist, he loves and respects his father despite fearing that he has gone mad.
- Navani Kholin, the widow of King Gavilar, mother of King Elhokar and Jasnah. A skilled scientist, she has always loved Dalinar, even when she was married to his brother, Gavilar. She attempts to rekindle a relationship with Dalinar but is initially rebuffed.
- Jasnah Kholin, the sister to the king of Alethkar and the greatest scholar in Roshar. Mostly viewed as a heretic by the ardentia.
- Taravangian, the king of Kharbranth.
- Kalak, a Herald of the Almighty. His viewpoint chapter is the prelude which takes place 4,500 years before the events of the first chapter.
- Axies the Collector, a Siah Aimian engaged in a quest to catalog all the different varieties of spren on Roshar.
- Baxil, a thief of Emuli nationality.
- Geranid, a scientist and philosopher. She lives on a small island, where she spends her time studying spren.
- Ishikk, a fisherman from the Purelake.
- Nan Balat, one of Shallan's brothers, a lighteyed Veden.
- Rysn, a young woman from Thaylenah, and an apprentice merchant.
- Wit, also known as Hoid, is the court jester of king Elhokar Kholin at the Shattered Plains. Hoid is in all books in the Cosmere, a universe where most works by Sanderson are set.

== Development ==
Sanderson started working on pieces of The Way of Kings in the late 1990s. Some characters and scenes, particularly Bridge Four, originated in Dragonsteel, Sanderson's honors thesis at Brigham Young University that was completed in 2000. The finished first draft of The Way of Kings was completed in 2003. Sanderson approached Tor with the book at this time. Although the publisher was interested, it decided that "something wasn’t quite right" and declined to publish it. Its further development was delayed when Sanderson instead decided to focus on the first Mistborn trilogy, which was published from 2006 to 2008. Returning to the task in the late 2000s, Sanderson indicated that he "threw away everything, and started on page one again."

On June 10, 2010, the prologue and the first three chapters of the book were released along with an introduction by Sanderson as a preview on Tor.com. On July 8, 2010, the next three chapters (4–6) were released in audio format. On August 5, 2010, chapters 9 and 11 were released. Chapters 7, 8, and 10 were not released on that date as Tor desired the contemporary focus to be drawn toward Kaladin, a main character. On August 26, 2010, chapters 12 and 13 were released.

Some of the early drafts have been made available in the years since. The original Dragonsteel text from 2000 is still in the possession of Brigham Young University. It was formerly available only via inter-library loan, and was the only undergraduate thesis in BYU history that needed to be rebound because it had been read so frequently. Several Dragonsteel-era Bridge Four chapters were released on Sanderson's website in 2017. The full text was ultimately made available as a bonus for the Words of Radiance leatherbound edition Kickstarter, as well as on Sanderson's website in 2024. The 2003 draft, retroactively entitled The Way of Kings Prime, was made available in its entirety on Sanderson's website in 2020.

== Reception ==
=== Critical response and sales ===
In its first week of released, the book was #7 on The New York Times Best Seller list. In subsequent weeks, the book was #11, #20, and #25.

The Way of Kings received critical acclaim and received praise for its extensive world-building. An early review from the website Unshelved gave the book a positive review. A review from Elitist Book Reviews pointed out some problems with the book (black-and-white characters, too much exposition), but gave an overall positive opinion of the book. The website SFReviews.net gave the book a mixed review, praising Sanderson's writing and creativity, but criticizing its extreme length and overall dearth of action.

=== Awards and nominations ===
Year	Award	Category	Result	Ref
2010	Whitney Awards	Best Novel of the Year	Won	
2010	Whitney Awards	Best Speculative Fiction	Won	
2010	Goodreads Choice Awards	Best Fantasy Novel	Nominated	
2011	David Gemmell Legend Award	Best Novel	Won	

== Adaptations ==
=== Audiobook ===
An audiobook version was released in August 2010 by Macmillan Audio, read by narrator team Kate Reading and Michael Kramer, who have also read several other books written by Sanderson, including The Wheel of Time series. Reading and Kramer also recorded an audio version of the 2002 draft, The Way of Kings Prime. That version is freely available on the Dragonsteel website.

A 5-part GraphicAudio version (a dramatized adaptation) of The Way of Kings was released between March and July 2016.

=== Film ===
In October 2016, the rights to the entire Cosmere universe were licensed by DMG Entertainment, though the rights on all Cosmere works besides The Stormlight Archive have since lapsed. DMG is fast-tracking an adaptation of The Way of Kings. Patrick Melton and Marcus Dunstan were hired as screenwriters. DMG founder Dan Mintz will produce the film, with Sanderson and Joshua Bilmes serving as executive producers.

=== Video game ===
A VR game, "The Way of Kings: Escape the Shattered Plains", developed by Arcturus Studios Inc, was released on March 2, 2018.
