= Rhythm of War =

Novel by Brandon Sanderson

- First edition book cover
- Author: Brandon Sanderson
- Cover artist: Michael Whelan
- Language: English
- Series: The Stormlight Archive
- Release number: 4
- Genre: Epic fantasy
- Publisher: Tor Books
- Publication date: November 17, 2020
- Publication place: United States
- Media type: Print (hardcover and paperback), audiobook, e-book
- Pages: 1232
- ISBN: 978-0765326386 (hardcover)
- Preceded by: Oathbringer
- Followed by: Wind and Truth

Rhythm of War is an epic fantasy novel written by American author Brandon Sanderson and the fourth book in The Stormlight Archive series. It was published by Tor Books on November 17, 2020. Rhythm of War consists of one prologue, 117 chapters, 12 interludes and an epilogue. It is preceded by Oathbringerand followed by Wind and Truth. As with Kaladin in The Way of Kings, Shallan in Words of Radiance, and Dalinar in Oathbringer, Rhythm of War has a sequence of flashback chapters, this time for characters Eshonai and Venli.

The book features illustrations of four Heralds, as well as illustrations of all the True Spren who form Nahel Bonds save for the Bondsmith spren. As with its Stormlight Archive predecessors, the unabridged audiobook is read by narration team Michael Kramer and Kate Reading.

A sequel, Wind and Truth, was released on December 6, 2024.

== Development ==
The writing process for the book started in January 2019, with a publication date planned for 2020. Before deciding the title would be Rhythm of War, the working title for the novel was The Song of Changes, which Brandon stated was never meant to be the final title. It later was announced that the book would be released on November 17, 2020.

Originally the book was to feature flashbacks from the point of view of Eshonai, with Venli taking center stage in the present-day timeline. Eventually Sanderson decided on mixed flashbacks, with part set from Eshonai's perspective, while the other part set from Venli's.

Sanderson has stated that the Wit epilogue of Rhythm of War is something he has been particularly looking forward to for a long time. He also stated there would be a time-jump between book three and four. While the title suggests greater focus on characters from the so-called 'singer culture', the remaining protagonists, including Kaladin Stormblessed, Shallan Davar, Dalinar Kholin, Navani, Adolin, as well as Bridge Four members also feature prominently. Narratives from the perspective of Szeth and Taravangian highlight many of the interludes.

The American cover was revealed on August 17, 2020.

== Plot ==
The story is broken up into five parts, and each part is broken into multiple POVs. Each characters progression through the book is as follows:

Dalinar: The Bondsmith takes Szeth, Jasnah (now Queen of Alethkar) and many Radiants to the frontlines of the war. Sensing something wrong in Urithiru, he seeks out Ishar, the Bondsmith Herald, hoping for guidance. Instead, the mad Herald attacks and flees, but has a moment of lucidity where he asks Dalinar to find and help him. Dalinar grows closer to the Stormfather, gaining the ability to ride with him on highstorms and slow time to speak to others that he is connected to. Dalinar formalizes his deal with Odium: the two agree to a contest of champions in ten days’ time which will end the war no matter who wins, though Odium will conquer more of Roshar and maintain his control over Alethkar if his champion wins. Odium explains that he intends to create an army of the most powerful surgebinders on Roshar, and conquer the Cosmere.

Navani: As Urithiru is overtaken by Fused and singers, the tower’s defenses are inverted to subdue the Radiants. Raboniel, the Fused in command of this mission, captures Navani but allows her to continue her research. After some time, Navani becomes able to manipulate Stormlight and Voidlight. She discovers that each god of Roshar: Honor, Cultivation, and Odium, has their own associated Light (Storm, Life, and Void) respectively, which can be combined to produce unique mixtures of light with different attributes. Navani eventually discovers how to make anti-light, which can permanently kill both Fused and spren, which could truly end the war between Radiants and Fused. Navani bonds with the spren of Urithiru, the Sibling, and becomes a Bondsmith. Navani regretfully attacks Raboniel, whom she had grown close to throughout the weeks of research, because they are still opposed and, at Raboniels request, permanently kills her. Both sides now have the means to permanently kill the other. Moash comes to Urithiru to kill Navani and Kaladin, and Navani manages to overwhelm and permanently blind him with an outpouring of light.

Adolin: Accompanying Shallan on a voyage to Shadesmar, he arrives in Lasting Integrity: the stronghold of the honorspren. To access the city, Adolin volunteers to be tried in court to determine the worthiness of humans to bond with spren, following the betrayal of the Radiants. The honorspren eventually bring in Maya, the catatonic spren of Adolin’s shardblade, as a witness, trying to incriminate him. However, Maya speaks (which was thought impossible) saying that the spren and Radiants together chose to give up their powers, even knowing that would destroy the spren, so there never was a betrayal at all. Many honorspren agree to bond with humans again due to this realization, and Adolin is found innocent of any charges

Shallan: Tasked by the Ghostbloods to find and kill a mysterious man known as Restares, who lives in Lasting Integrity, Shallan discovers that he is none other than Kelek, the Herald. She refuses to kill him and starts to heal from her split personality, absorbing Veil. She remembers that she used to be bonded to a different cryptic before Pattern, whom she inadvertently turned into deadeyes as a child. She and Adolin find the deadeyed spren, Testament, and begin trying to help her recover as Adolin has helped Maya. Shallan declares war on the Ghostbloods.

Kaladin: Struggling with his depression and shaken from an encounter with Moash in Hearthstone, Kaladin is relieved of duty by Dalinar. In hearthstone, Kaladin also encountered a new type of Fused named Lezrian who took pleasure in stalking and killing his victims. While initially resentful of being relieved of duty, Kaladin finds purpose in helping others with mental illness, people who were often institutionalized regardless of their condition. When Urithiru is overrun, all of the Radiants except Kaladin and Lift fall unconscious, Kaladin due to his closeness to the Fourth Ideal, and Lift due to her unique powers. Though still unstable, Kaladin fights back, protecting the Sibling and harrying the Fused. A resistance of humans forms, marking themselves with the shash brand in an homage to Kaladin, and the tower eventually erupts into full-on rebellion. Severely wounded, Kaladin is healed by Lift and rallies to defeat Lezrian, who is later killed by Odium for his failure. While in Urithiru, Moash attacks and kills Teft’s spren with anti-stormlight, and then kills Teft himself. Kaladin is heartbroken over Teft’s death, and nearly ends his own life before being consoled and revitalized by Dalinar through a vision of Tien, where Kaladin learns that Tien chose to be on the front lines where he was killed so that he could make the other boys feel braver. Understanding that he cannot always protect everyone, Kaladin swears the Fourth Ideal and is able to save his father, who had been kidnapped and thrown off of the Tower.

Venli: It is revealed how Venli ushered in the Fused and Regal forms in the backstories of her and Eshonai. In the present, Venli is secretly working to overthrow most of the Fused with a few allies, including Leshwi who is a Fused herself. She eventually resolves to save Kaladin’s parents and Lift as a part of her Radiant Oaths. Venli and Leshwi, and their followers, join the revolt in the tower, fighting against the other singers. Venli discovers that the listeners who fled the first Everstorm are still alive and she and Rlain reunite with them as Venli swears the 2nd Ideal of a Willshaper. It is revealed that Eshonai was briefly a Radiant before her death, and was able to ride the storms with Stormfather to see the whole world, which was her dream, before dying peacefully.

Taravingian: Taravingian realizes that Nightblood, Szeth’s sword, cannot be seen by Odium’s foresight. During an assassination attempt by Szeth, Taravingian manages to draw Nightblood and, pulled into a vision by Odium, strikes the god. It is revealed that the gods of the Cosmere are people who have taken charge of primal sources of cosmic power, called Shards (not to be confused with the Blade and Plate remnants of the Knights Radiant, also called shards). Taravingian kills the man, Rayse, who owned Odium’s Shard, and ascends in his place. He manipulates Wit’s memories and thus fools Wit into thinking that Odium is still Rayse. Wit is revealed to be a being, Cephandrius, who is as old as all of the first gods of the Cosmere.

== Viewpoint characters ==
The primary chapters within the book are told from the viewpoint of several major characters, while the book's interludes are told from the viewpoint of other characters (not all of which repeat).

=== Main ===
Kaladin

== Pre-Publication ==
Sanderson shared multiple fragments of Rhythm of War before publication. On July 23, Tor started the publication of preview chapters on their website. Previews include:

- Two versions of a Lirin point-of-view section
- A recorded reading of a Venli POV section
- A fragment of the Navani prologue
- A very early version of an Eshonai flashback scene
- A Lift interlude
- A Syl interlude released in the July 2020 newsletter

== Publication ==
The book was published by Tor on November 17, 2020.

On July 12, 2020, Sanderson announced on his official Twitter account that he had finished the book and turned in the manuscript. At roughly 460,000 words, Rhythm of War is slightly longer than its predecessor, Oathbringer, including a prologue, epilogue, 117 chapters, and multiple interludes.

== Audiobook ==
The unabridged audiobook version of the book was released on the same day as the hardcover version, and is read by narrator team Michael Kramer and Kate Reading, who also read The Way of Kings, Words of Radiance, Oathbringer and several other books written by Sanderson. This version won the 2022 Audie Award for Fantasy.

A 6-part GraphicAudio version (dramatized adaptation) of Rhythm of War was released between December 2020 and December 2021:

Rhythm of War [Dramatized Adaptation]
| Part | Publication Date | Ref |
|---|---|---|
| 1 | 21 December 2020 | |
| 2 | 25 February 2021 | |
| 3 | 30 April 2021 | |
| 4 | 12 July 2021 | |
| 5 | 28 September 2021 | |
| 6 | 3 December 2021 | |
