= Rachel Aaron =

American science fiction and fantasy writer (born c.1982)

- Born: 1982 (age 43–44)
- Occupation: Author
- Writing career
- Pen name: Rachel Bach
- Genres: Fantasy; science fiction
- Notable awards: Audie Award for Fantasy (2016)
- Website: rachelaaron.net

Rachel Aaron (born c. 1982) is an American author of fantasy and (under the pen name Rachel Bach) science fiction.

== Work ==
The first book in the Paradox Series, Fortune's Pawn (2013), is a type of space opera which was called "lots of fun" by Kirkus Reviews. Fortune's Pawn also marked Aaron's first time publishing science fiction. Publishers Weekly, however, felt that the tropes of the first book in the series were cliché and made up of "stock set pieces." Aaron's Paradox Series, including Honor's Knight (2014) deals with ethical questions amid "great space battles, awesome shootouts and enough betrayals and alliances to rival 'A Game of Thrones,'" according to The Washington Post. Kirkus also called Heaven's Queen (2014) a "stunning conclusion" to the Paradox Series. Publishers Weekly wrote that Heaven's Queen was a "satisfying conclusion."

Aaron's fantasy work on the Eli Monpress series revolves around a "legendary and lovable con man." The first book in the series, The Spirit Thief (2010) starts slow, according to the Publishers Weekly, but becomes a "romp of lighthearted fantasy."

== Awards ==
On May 11, 2016, Rachel Aaron won the Best Fantasy Audie Award for her work, Nice Dragons Finish Last, as narrated by Vikas Adam.

== Bibliography ==
=== Fiction ===
==== Tear Down Heaven ====
- ——— (2024). Hell for Hire. Aaron Bach LLC. ISBN 1952367328.
- ——— (2024). Hell of a Witch. Aaron Bach LLC. ISBN 1952367433.
- ——— (2025). Hell to Pay. Aaron Bach LLC. ISBN 1952367468.
- ——— (2025). Hell Hath No Fury. Aaron Bach LLC. ISBN 1952367492.
- ——— (2026). Tear Down Heaven. Aaron Bach LLC. ISBN 1952367522.

==== DFZ Changeling ====
- ——— (2023). By a Silver Thread. Aaron Bach LLC. ISBN 9781952367212.
- ——— (2023). With a Golden Sword. Aaron Bach LLC. ISBN 9781952367229.
- ——— (2024). To the Bloody End. Aaron Bach LLC. ISBN 9781952367236.

==== The Crystal Calamity ====
- ——— (2022). The Last Stand of Mary Good Crow. Aaron Bach LLC. ISBN 9781952367052.
- ——— (2023). The Battle of Medicine Rocks. Aaron Bach LLC. ISBN 1952367077.

==== DFZ ====
- ——— (2020). Minimum Wage Magic. Aaron Bach LLC. ISBN 9781952367007.
- ——— (2020). Part-Time Gods. Aaron Bach LLC. ISBN 9781952367014.
- ——— (2021). Night Shift Dragons. Aaron Bach LLC. ISBN 9781952367045.

==== Heartstrikers ====
- ——— (2014). Nice Dragons Finish Last. Createspace Independent Publishing Platform. ISBN 9781500506339.
- ——— (2015). One Good Dragon Deserves Another. Createspace Independent Publishing Platform. ISBN 9781519249968.
- ——— (2016). No Good Dragon Goes Unpunished. Createspace Independent Publishing Platform. ISBN 9781535289986.
- ——— (2017). A Dragon of a Different Color. Createspace Independent Publishing Platform. ISBN 9781974466795.
- ——— (2018). Last Dragon Standing. Createspace Independent Publishing Platform. ISBN 9781987552980.

==== Forever Fantasy Online ====
- ———; Bach, Travis (2020). Forever Fantasy Online. Aaron Bach LLC. ISBN 9781952367021.
- ———; Bach, Travis (2020). Last Bastion. Aaron Bach LLC. ISBN 9780578568331.
- ———; Bach, Travis (2020). The Once King. Aaron Bach LLC. ISBN 9781952367038.

===== The Legend of Eli Monpress =====
- ——— (2010). The Spirit Thief. Orbit. ISBN 9780316120821.
- ——— (2010). The Spirit Rebellion. Orbit. ISBN 9780316120791.
- ——— (2010). The Spirit Eater. Orbit. ISBN 9780316132688.
- ——— (2012). The Spirit War. Orbit. ISBN 9780316192927.
- ——— (2012). Spirit's End. Orbit. ISBN 9780316198363.
- ——— (2012). The Legend of Eli Monpress. Orbit. ISBN 9780316193573.
- ——— (2012). The Revenge of Eli Monpress. Orbit. ISBN 9780356501840.

==== Attack on Titan ====
- ——— (2018). Attack on Titan: Garrison Girl. Quirk Books. ISBN 9781683690610.

==== The Paradox Trilogy ====
- Bach, Rachel (2013). Fortune's Pawn. Orbit. ISBN 9780316221092.
- ——— (2014). Honor's Knight. Orbit. ISBN 9780316221078.
- ——— (2014). Heaven's Queen. Orbit. ISBN 9781405525251.

=== Non-fiction ===
- Aaron, Rachel (2017). 2K to 10K: Writing Faster, Writing Better, and Writing More of What You Love. CreateSpace Independent Publishing Platform. ISBN 9781548271107.
