= Oathbringer =

2017 novel by Brandon Sanderson

- First edition book cover
- Author: Brandon Sanderson
- Illustrator: Dan dos Santos; Isaac Stewart; Howard Lyon
- Cover artist: Michael Whelan
- Language: English
- Series: The Stormlight Archive
- Release number: 3
- Genre: Epic fantasy
- Publisher: Tor Books
- Publication date: November 14, 2017
- Publication place: United States
- Media type: Print (hardcover and paperback), audiobook, e-book
- Pages: 1248
- ISBN: 978-0-7653-2637-9
- Preceded by: Words of Radiance
- Followed by: Rhythm of War

Oathbringer is an epic fantasy novel written by American author Brandon Sanderson and the third book in The Stormlight Archive series. It was published by Tor Books on November 14, 2017. Oathbringer consists of one prologue, 122 chapters, 14 interludes and an epilogue. It is preceded by Words of Radiance and followed by Rhythm of War.

As with its Stormlight Archive predecessors, the unabridged audiobook is read by narrator team Michael Kramer and Kate Reading.

== Development ==
The third book was initially titled Stones Unhallowed with Szeth-son-son-Vallano as its focus, then Skybreaker, and eventually Oathbringer with the focus on Dalinar Kholin.

Prior to the release of Oathbringer, several chapters and interludes had been posted in blog posts, read in conventions and published in an anthology. Sanderson provided numerous updates on Reddit about his progress on the book. On December 9, 2016, three weeks after his fifth update, his publisher Tor announced that Sanderson had completed his first draft, coming in at 461,223 words. On March 15, 2017, Sanderson completed the third of five planned drafts, which totaled 514,000 words. On June 15, 2017, Sanderson completed the fifth and final draft and managed to cut it down to 450,000 words. On June 27, 2017, Tor posted a blog post detailing the process of beta reading for Oathbringer in which beta readers give their immediate reactions to any given point in the story and look for continuity. Due to the length of the book, Tor had to use a different press and bindery from the one that printed Words of Radiance.

After realizing the book took more time to work on than originally planned, Sanderson wrote a novella titled Edgedancer, following Lift; first published in Arcanum Unbounded: The Cosmere Collection, an anthology of Cosmere short fiction, on November 22, 2016.

On March 16, 2017, Tor Books revealed the cover art for Oathbringer, painted by Michael Whelan. It shows Jasnah Kholin defending a city against an invasion. She reaches for a Shardblade while simultaneously soulcasting a large hole in the city wall made by a thunderclast. Three days later, Tor posted a blog post that discussed details of the cover and how it may relate to the book's plot. On July 14, 2017, Sanderson revealed the UK cover of Oathbringer on Twitter.

The hardcover version of the novel was published with endpapers which depict 4 of the ten heralds, two created by each artist Howard Lyon and Dan dos Santos. Reviewer Frannie Jackson described the art as "gorgeous."

On August 2, 2017, Tor Books revealed the dates and locations for the Oathbringer book tour. Tor.com released the prologue on August 22; and the first 32 chapters, three weekly, from August 29 to November 7.

== Plot ==
=== Prologue ===
Six years ago, Eshonai and the Listeners visited Kholinar to celebrate the peace treaty. Gavilar invites Eshonai for a private conversation and uncovers a Fabrial device that can trap a Spren inside the Gemhearts. Much to Eshonai's horror, Gavilar revealed his plan to revive the Gods who had deserted her people many years ago and gave her the dark Gemheart as a gift while instructing her to send a message to the council. Eshonai informs the five Listeners about the King's plans and decides to send an assassin to prevent Gavilar's actions. In the evening before the assassination, Eshonai fled in tears after her performance.

=== Part One ===
Six days after settling at Urithiru, Dalinar Kholin, with his Bondsmith ability, revisits the vision he experienced earlier with Stormfather's aid. He discovers that the Almighty, whom Odium killed, was named Honor who had warned him about the upcoming Everstorm that would decimate Roshar. As Dalinar explores the ruins of Kholinar and experiences the Everstorm, he catches a glimpse of Odium summoning his nine corrupted shadowed Sprens known as the Unmade. Now awakened from his vision, Dalinar plans to continue his goal of reuniting Roshar against Odium's actions. Having expressed his feelings over the loss of his first wife and his memory, Dalinar proposes a marriage with Navani where Stormfather declares his consent to them.

After departing the Shattered Plains, Kaladin visits his hometown, Hearthstone. Upon his arrival, Kaladin reunites with his parents who introduce his youngest brother before he reveals himself as a Radiant. Upon investigating the devastating effects of the Everstorm, Kaladin decides to venture out to several ransacked Alethi towns to learn more about the Parshendi. Kaladin tracks the escaped Parshmen and turns himself in to avoid conflict. Kaladin learns from Syl that the Everstorm had altered the Parshmans' physiques and intelligence allowing them to rebond with Voidspren. The Voidspren are guiding the enslaved Parshmen to the Alethi capital city, Kholinar, as a declaration of war against humanity and reclaiming Alethkar. Upon arriving at the town of Revolar, Kaladin quickly flees upon learning about the Highstorm. As a Highstorm approaches, Kaladin helps the citizens to shelter from the Highstorm, but two empowered Parshmen known as the Fused attack him. Kaladin quickly escapes and flies back to Urithiru following Syl's direction.

Shallan, having recovered her childhood memory, visits the Kholin family to discuss further uniting Roshar. As Dalinar, frustrated, begins to lose hope, Shallan unknowingly summons an illusion of Roshar as she touches the map and combines her Lightweaving with Dalinar's Bondsmith abilities, thus revealing the location of Ten Oathgates. Intrigued, Dalinar decides to focus on Jah Keved, Thaylenah, and Azir to form a political alliance. Tension begins to run high following Torol Sadeas' murder, and his followers from Sadeas' war camp grow distrustful of the Kholin family. Sadeas' wife Ialai promotes Amaram as the new Highprince. In response, Shallan begins investigating several incidents including Sadeas' death along with a copycat murder with Adolin, to whom Dalinar entrusted. Shallan feels traumatized by having to wield a Shardblade during training with Adolin and decides to take an altered persona as Brightness Radiant to help accomplish her task. Upon meeting Sadeas' wife Ialai, Shallan confronts Mraize, who offers her information about her brother after she succeeds in her mission. Mraize reveals to Shallan that a dark force threatens society in Urithiru and encourages her to investigate. As she explores deeper into the city, Shallan spots a shadowy Spren though loses sight of it. Shallan devises a plan to track the Spren and follows it down through Urithiru toward an unexplored area. Joined by Adolin, Renarin, and some Bridge Four members, the group discovers an abandoned library in ruins inhabited by an Unmade named Re-Shephir, the Midnight Mother. The group began fighting against the Unmade's influence. Upon discovering its vulnerability to Lightweaving, Shallan repels Re-Shephir causing it to retreat. Following the incident, Shallan faces the unexpected reunion of Jasnah Kholin who survived her assassination attempt aboard the Wind's Pleasure by escaping to Shadesmar.

As Dalinar begins his negotiation, he questions the Knight Radiants' betrayal through the Stormfather's refusal. Despite the Emperor of Azir and Queen Fen Rnamndi's refusal of Alethi's aid, Dalinar and his followers manage to gain contact with Taravangian who agrees with Dalinar's plan. King Elhokar, having recovered from an assassination attempt, grows despondent of his kingship and plans to abdicate the throne to Dalinar. Instead, they agree to let Dalinar be the king of Urithiru and the Shattered Plains, forfeiting his Alethkar lands to his heir. Upon learning about the riots in Kholinar, Dalinar advises his nephew to send scouts to investigate the riot and Elhokar's wife's behavior while sending Kaladin there to activate the Oathgate, encouraging Elhokar to restore the city. Dalinar learns from Stormfather that the only chance to stop Odium is to accept a challenge that Odium himself cannot deny. As Dalinar attends his meeting with the Iriali queen, he challenges the ardent Kadesh to a duel while arguing about their religious faith in the Almighty. Dalinar ends the duel revealing himself as the Knights Radiant and Navani reports that the queen demands Adolin's armoured Shardplate due to her begrudging the Kholin family since the arranged marriage between Dalinar and his former wife. At this moment, Dalinar's memories of his wife Evi are restored. Due to his promise to the Stormfather to be a Bondsmith, Dalinar manages to recover Oathbringer and return it to Ialai Sadeas, despite her disapproval. Taravangian arrives at Urithiru for a visit and introduces Dalinar to a Dustbringer named Malata, a new member of Knights Radiant. During the visit, Taravangian observes Dalinar's approach and questions his moral views from The Way of Kings. As Dalinar and Stormfather discuss their situation, Stormfather reveals that he can send visions to anyone he chooses, which gives Dalinar a persuasive idea.

Meanwhile, in the Shattered Plains, Venli and her followers, with their new forms, are sent to recover Eshonai's Shardplate under the command of Odium's Voidspren, Ulim. While departing Eshonai's body, a grieving Venli encounters a Spren and ignores it.

=== Part Two ===
After persuading Fen about the Voidbringer's threat via a vision from the Stormfather, Dalinar invites Jasnah and Navani to enter the vision where Aharietiam, The Last Desolation, takes place. As they explore the battlefield, Dalinar and Navani discover where the nine Honorblades have settled. The Stormfather reveals the truth behind the Heralds' departure. After being imprisoned in an isolated place called Damnation, Odium granted the former Voidbringers immortality in which they can resurrect themselves as Parshmen and transform them into a Fused. Honor sent out Ten Heralds to fend off against Odium's forces. But having succumbed from their ongoing battle and torture, the nine Heralds abandoned their Oathpact leaving one Herald Talenal to continue the fight for over four thousand years of torture. Dalinar realizes that the catatonic madman he encountered is Talenal, and his blade is a regular Shardblade. Dalinar returns to the war camp on the Shattered Plains and discovers that Talenal is missing.

Despite their reunion, Shallan grows more discomforted with Jasnah's criticism. As Veil, an older Darkeyed alter-ego created through Lightweaving, she manages to hire recruits Gaz and Red for basic training on infiltration and a new assistant named Ishnah to help infiltrate the Ghostbloods. Shallan receives a letter from Mraize about her brother during her break time. Mraize revealed that Heleran was recruited as a Skybreaker acolyte led by the former Herald of Justice, Nale. Nale sent Heleran to kill Amaram as a test for loyalty, resulting in his death by Kaladin. To avoid her frustration with Jasnah's lecturing, Shallan plans to travel with Kaladin to Thaylena's capital, Thaylen City, to open its Oathgate. She persuades King Elhokar of the value of her disguises and infiltration and gets permission to help retake Kholinar. While researching, Jasnah begins to ponder the knowledge unearthed on Urithiru while growing suspicious of Shallan's previous absences and Renarin's use of his Truthwatcher abilities. After she feuds with Amaram about her uncle, Renarin surprises everyone with his abilities upon discovering hidden contents within the library: records of Urithiru preserved in crystals hidden in the library walls.

Through the perspectives of Bridge Four, Kaladin begins training his friends to achieve their Windrunnering ability before traveling to Kholinar for the upcoming battle. Each of Bridge Four begins experiencing Windrunner abilities including absorbing stormlights, healing wounds, and lashing. Meanwhile, in the Frostlands, Moash, having fled from the Shattered Plains, is ambushed by a group of Fused. He kills one of them and is carried to Revolar for enslavement. Despite his captivity, Moash grows more attached to the Parshmen and supports them in their upcoming battle against Kholinar. Having grown frustrated with the Parshmen's plight and the Fused's cruelty toward lesser Parshmen, Moash demands to consult with their leader and encounters the Fused named Leshwi, the Fused whom Moash killed during his capture. Leshwi explains that she spared him due to his passion for fighting. Moash admitted that he had given up his faith in humanity and sought vengeance instead. Impressed, Leshwi informs him about the Fused as he begins training the Parshendi to fight spears.

With another Bondsmith vision, Dalinar contacts Prime Aquasix Yanagawn (formally named Gawx) and informs him about the Voidbringers' threat but Gawx grows skeptical toward him. Despite his efforts, Lift, having contacted the Nightwatcher, manages to enter his vision and carries Gawx away, much to the Stormfather's surprise. Upon arriving at the Recreace vision with Jasnah and Navani, Yanagawn visits Dalinar and discusses it privately. Yanagawn reveals to Dalinar, the Azish viziers' paranoia of the Assassin in White and Lift's distrust towards Dalinar for his self-righteousness. As Dalinar begins to elaborate, the vision is suddenly interrupted by a man clad in white and gold who reveals himself as Odium, taking Dalinar by surprise. Upon divulging his motivation and passion to kill another Shard named Cultivation, Odium remains shackled and persuades Dalinar to release him by Intent, which the latter refuses. As Odium departs, Dalinar challenges Odium to a challenge of champions but he declines. Dalinar states that he is no longer afraid of Odium before Odium reveals his true power, overwhelming Dalinar with intense visions. Having eavesdropped on Dalinar and Odium, Lift decides to convince Yanagawn to visit Urithiru before the visions fade.

Upon reviewing his Diagram, Taravangian revises his scheme to exploit Dalinar's weakness and seeks to negotiate with Odium. Meanwhile, Venli and her eight followers volunteer and embrace their transformation from the Everstorm. However, as the storm subsides she is left in Nimbleform while others, including her mate Demid, are transformed into the Fused under the possession of former Voidbringers. The Fused named Hariel takes possession of Demid and informs a pleading Venli that the transformation can not be undone, even by Odium. Before departing to Alethkar, Venli spots the Spren and hides it from the Fused.

=== Part Three ===
Shallan activates the Oathgate to Thaylen City and Dalinar and Navani, along with Taravangian, visit Queen Fen Rnamdi. Upon arriving at Thaylen City, they witness the casualties caused by the Everstorm and Thaylen's distrust toward them. While exploring the city Dalinar senses a voice pleading for help and inadvertently uses his Bondsmith abilities, successfully repairing a broken statue. Fen witnesses Renarin healing the wounded populace and Dalinar rebuilding the city and finally accepts Dalinar's wish to discuss forming a coalition. Dalinar then travels to Azir using their Oathgate and uses Navani's essays and Fen's permit to convince the Azish scholars. Upon meeting up with Lift, the Azish scholars accept their accords. When Dalinar returns to Urithiru, he suddenly collapses upon learning of the tragic death of his wife, Evi. Flashbacks of Dalinar's past are revealed at the battle of Rathalas where the residents rebelled against the Alethi kingdom. A young Dalinar claimed the shardblade Oathbringer after a prolonged struggle with its former owner Brightlord Tanalan, ruler of Rathlas. Upon defeating Tanalan, Dalinar chose to spare Tanalan's son. Years later, the son declared war to avenge his father. Over the years Evi had grown despondent with Dalinar's passion for violence, lack of attention to his sons and his constant war campaigns with Rathalas. After being deceived and humiliated by Tanalan's son, Dalinar decimated Rathalas unaware that Evi was held captive in the city, and died in the flames trying to persuade the residents to surrender. Dalinar is left devastated by his actions and swears the Alethi scribes to secrecy.

Elhokar's group arrives at Alethkar's capital Kholinar to reclaim it and open the Oathgate. As they enter the city using Shallan's illusions as disguises, the group deduces that an Unmade has manifested its influence over the city's livelihood, corrupting both people and Spren. The Fused continued raiding the town and attacking the city walls and the Highprinces who resided mysteriously disappeared into the palace leaving the residents starved. Furthermore, a group worshipping the corrupted Spren and calling themselves the Cult of Moments has occupied the Oathgate. Any attempt to use Stormlight including spanreeds and fabrials causes the corrupted Spren to scream and attract Fused to investigate. Elhokar devises a plan for the group to split up and gather information before retaking the palace by force: Shallan's group will infiltrate the Cult of Moments to gain access to the Oathgate Platform and Kaladin alone will investigate the mysterious high marshal of the wall guard named Azure.

Kaladin visits and easily befriends the wall guards who recruit him as their ally Azure leads the wall guards. Kaladin learns from Azure that she has sent out Wall guards to prevent the Voidbringers' attack fearing that the army is planning to storm the city. During an attack by the Fused Kaladin manages to kill one and reveals himself to Azure as Elhokar's bodyguard. During their conversation, Azure reveals that she is helping with the city's food supplies for the refugees using metal plates to hide the Soulcasters from the Voidbringers which causes them to lose contact with Urithiru.

During her infiltration of the palace, Shallan uses her persona Veil to raid food supplies from Alethi highlords and gain the Cult's trust. However, she is troubled to find her personality and mentality change more and more whenever she uses a persona. While infiltrating she hears strange voices from the Unmade causing her to break free and return to Shallan. After learning from Wit about the cult and palace guards' behaviors, Shallan arrives at the Oathgate platform within the Palace monastery and discovers there are two of the Unmade corrupting the city: Sja-anat (The Taker of Secrets) and Ashertmarn (Heart of the Revel) are responsible for manipulating the Alethi residents and corrupting the Sprens. Sja-anat divulges to Shallan that Ashertmarn set up a trap for anyone who tries to access the gate causing her to retreat and warn King Elhokar. After escaping the palace, Shallan is horrified upon witnessing a young civilian's death at the hands of street thugs and blames herself. Arriving at the scene, Wit comforts her and advises her of the reality of failure.

After hearing Shallan's report of the Unmade and Kaladin's recruitment of Highmarshal Azure and her guards, King Elhokar storms the castle to retake Kholinar. The Voidbringer army summons a giant stone Thunderclast to weaken the wall guard's defense. Having wasted no time, Elhokar's army overpowered the queen's corrupted guards and entered the palace. Splitting up, Kaladin and Elhokar head to the throne room to confront Queen Aesudan while Adolin and Shallan go to the monastery to open the Oathgate. As Shallan tries to repel Ashertmarn from the gate, the Unmade quickly flees which Shallan finds suspicious. Sja-anat persuades Shallan to take the alternative route before accessing the gate to the exact location.

Meanwhile, Kaladin and Elhokar arrive at the throne and discover Queen Aesudan corrupted by the Unmade Yelig-nar and Ashertmarn. Kaladin manages to recover Elhokar's son Gavinor from the Unmades' influence and convinces Elhokar to retreat. As they retreat, the Parshendi army storms the palace and injures Elhokar in the conflict. Upon recognizing the familiar faces of Parshendi he previously encountered, Kaladin is horrified as he sees both sides slaughtering each other. As the Parshendi begin to overwhelm them, Moash arrives at the scene and kills Elhokar who is about to say his first ideal. Having failed to protect the King and Kholinar now under the Voidbringers' control, Adolin retrieves a distraught Kaladin and Azure from the siege and retreats to the Oathgate just as Shallan summons her blade to open the gate sending them to Shadesmar.

After departing from the Fused, Venli follows Odium's instructions teaching her people and addresses their tribal names as Listeners. After arriving at Kholinar, she feels shunned by Odium's negligence with Timbre, the Spren she bonded, comforting her.

=== Part Four ===
Somewhere at the Pure Lake, Szeth-son-Neturo continues training as a Skybreaker upon receiving Nightblood. Preparing to confront his people from Shinovar, Szeth masters his surge binding through his training and uses the blade for an execution. Despite this, he struggles to control its power and bloodlust. As he prepares to speak his fourth ideal, Nale approaches Szeth and escorts him to a ruined courthouse of Marat. Nale reveals to Szeth that he was warned by Ishar to prevent another desolation by eliminating the surge-binder but failed because of the Everstorm. He forms his own Radiant based on the fifth ideal he swears an oath while reclaiming his Honorblade and informs Szeth about his event during Aharietiam.

After escaping from Kholinar, Kaladin, Adolin, Azure, and Shallan along with their Sprens find themselves stranded within Shadesmar. The group discovers that the Unmade have corrupted the Oathgate Sprens and sabotaged their escape attempt which Sja-anat warned them about. Azure claims they can return to the physical world by traveling to Horneaters Peak and seeking a gateway known as the Perpendicularity. The group travels south and stumbles upon a mysterious lighthouse where Kaladin encounters a lighthouse keeper named Riino, observing ship transportation. In the lighthouse, Kaladin touches a gemstone and sees a vision of Thaylen City overrun by Voidbringers and Dalinar surrounded by the Unmade. Shocked by what he saw, Kaladin suggests the group travel south to Thaylen City with Shallan, who can access the Oathgate and teleport them to the physical realm to rescue Dalinar. Upon arriving at the Spren's market city Celebrant, they find it patrolled by Fused and notice the Fused detecting their presence on the boat they arrived on. Upon revealing herself as the fugitive from Shadesmar, Syl manages to gain Honorsprens' attention allowing the group to climb aboard an Honorspren ship called Honor's Path and escape the Fused's wraith. With Syl now captive, Kaladin tries to persuade the captain to release her as he inadvertently summons Windspren and surprises the Spren on board. At the same time, Shallan practices her soulcasting ability by testing the beads collected from the ocean surrounding them. Along the journey, Adolin confesses to Shallan that he killed Sadeas out of spite and betrayal. As they approach Thaylenah, the Fused appear and pursue the Honor's Path. After freeing Syl, Kaladin, Shallan, and Adolin, along with their Sprens, continue their journey to Thaylen City leaving Azure behind to rescue her men stranded in Kholinar. After a few weeks of hiking across a crystallized jungle, they arrived at the Oathgate heavily guarded by Voidspren.

Meanwhile, with Kholinar fallen and his memories restored, Dalinar is traumatized by his part in Evi's death and continues to doubt himself for his purpose while struggling to confront his past and his alcoholism. With Dalinar's absence, Navani is left in charge of handling political meetings with Azish scholars from Azir with an alliance (Emul, Tashikk, and Yezeir), Queen Fen of Thaylenah, and Taravagian of Jah Keved and Kharbranth. The men of Bridge four secure Jezrien's Honorblade at Dalinar's request. Having learned the truth about the Thrill at Jah Keved and fear of his past trauma, Dalinar quickly fled in terror before falling unconscious upon seeing the vision of Nohadan. During that time, he slowly learns the events after Gavilar's funeral. With Elhokar's declaration of war against the Parshendi, Dalinar struggled to contain his mental state and decided to travel to Natanatan upon learning the rumors of an Old Magic that could heal him.

Back in the present, after recovering from his experience, Dalinar returns to the meeting and tries to explain away his absence leaving Queen Fen disapproving. As the meeting prepares to defend Jah Keved from the Parshmen's attack, Dalinar realizes that the Parshmen are instead planning to attack Thaylen City to access the Oathgate. With the city now vulnerable to the Everstorm, Dalinar realizes the Parshmen army was settling at Marat for a naval battle after they raided ships for their campaign. Using Navani's knowledge of the tower and the arrival of a high storm, Dalinar contacts Venli with Stormfather stalling Odium. Dalinar tries to form a peace treaty for Venli with the latter reluctant to accept by letting Parshmen take over Alethkar as their home. Odium manages to overpower Stormfather and interrupts their conversation causing Dalinar to be overwhelmed by his influence realizing the mistake he made. During that time, Venli inadvertently bonded with Timbre after she struggled with Odium's influence. After realizing Dalinar has recovered, Taravangian devises a plan to leak knowledge of Dalinar's promotion to King of Urithiru to Tashikk to discredit Dalinar. The coalition arrives at Thaylen City for the meeting with Dalinar and as the meeting progresses he is hopeful about uniting Roshar. As they converse Stormfather senses a bigger threat. The Spanreeds quickly spread Taravagnian's leaked information to everyone causing doubts and suspicions towards Dalinar. Dalinar, Jasnah, and Navani are shocked to learn about the Eila Stele: an ancient historical text revealing that humans were the Voidbringers, having arrived in Roshar after the destruction of their own world and conquered the Parshmen leading to the first desolation. With this revelation and in the wake of Taravagnian's secret betrayal, the coalition disbands leaving Dalinar in total despair.

In Marat, Venli joins the Voidbringers' army to prepare for the attack with the Everstorm guiding them. Rysn who is now paraplegic after her journey from Reshi Islands volunteers to recover the King's Drop, a famous gemstone, from the safeguarded vault. However, a Voidbringer thief attacks the guards and steals the Gemstone. Rysn kills him with the help of her Larkin, Chri-Chri. After leaving Thaylen City from the Oathgate, Bridge Four finds three members injured from an attack and the Honorblade stolen. Bisig claims that someone wearing a Bridge Four uniform with lieutenant markings committed the attack. This causes Teft to flee in shock as he realises it was his jacket which he had previously sold to finance his firemoss addiction.

=== Part Five ===
With the Parshmen army approaching Thaylen City, Dalinar remembers his encounter with the Nightwatcher and its creator Cultivation. Upon arriving at the region of Greater Hexi five and a half years ago, Dalinar pleaded to a reluctant Cultivation to heal his trauma. Instead, Cultivation erases his memory of Evi and the massacre he committed allowing him to continue protecting King Elhokar. With his memories restored, Dalinar carries the Way of Kings book for comfort and goes across the city streets to confront Odium alone. Upon arriving with the army at Thaylen City, Venli witnesses Odium's arrival and orders the Fused for a tactical approach. With the Thunderclasts awakened to destroy the city's defense, Odium summons the red mist-like Unmade Nergaoul, which is revealed to be the Thrill. Nergaoul sweeps through most of Sadeas' army, including Amaram himself, placing them under Odium's command. Following Nale's instruction, Szeth arrives to aid Dalinar in the battle against Odium and Lift also chooses to stay and help. Dalinar instructs Lift to retrieve the King's Drop gemstone after the Voidbringer took it from Rysn's grasp. Despite her best efforts Lift fails to recover the gemstone due to the rampaging Thunderclasts. Szeth manages to kill the beast and overpower the Voidbringer with Nightblood but begins to succumb to its bloodlust as Lift tries to heal him. Dalinar meets Odium in person and challenges him to a duel. However, Odium chooses Dalinar as his champion and manipulates him to surrender Dalinar's agony of guilt, sorrow, and pain. By acknowledging the errors of his past, Dalinar overcomes Odium's influence and swears a Bondsmith Oath causing the Gloryspren to form a column of light. Dalinar reaches into the cognitive and spiritual realms and brings them together, opening Honor's perpendicularity of three realms causing Odium to flee in terror.

Jasnah approaches Renarin who foresaw a vision of his death with his Spren Glys and suspects that Renarin and Glys are both corrupted by a voidbringer. As Jasnah prepares to make a kill, Renarin accepts his fate only for Jasnah to spare him, confirming that his visions are wrong. Having been informed by Mraize, Ash arrives to retrieve Talenal who slowly recovers from his comatose state. In Urithriu, the Parshmen began attacking the tower, forcing a reluctant Teft to regain his honor, speak the ideals and fight against the intruders.

In Shadesmar, Kaladin distracts the Fused with his lashing ability while Adolin, Syl, and Pattern divert the others' attention with illusions leaving Shallan to persuade the Oathgate sprens to open the perpendicularity. The Oathgate Sprens refuse to provide access to the physical realm having sworn their Oaths to Honor. Adolin is wounded during the struggle and Kaladin rapidly loses his Stormlight while fighting the Fused. When all hope seems lost and Kaladin can not speak the fourth ideal, the group notices the perpendicularity opening allowing them to escape Shadesmar. With the Radiants reunited, they band together to stand against the Parshmen army. Dalinar confronts the Thrill, Kaladin engages in his final duel with Amaram who has become corrupted by Yelig-nar's influence, Shallan summons illusions to divert the army, Szeth and Lift continue their mission to recover the stolen gemstone, Jasnah and Adolin help the refugee while fending off against Sadeas' army and the Fused, and Renarin kills the last Thunderclast and accesses the Oathgate to summon Bridge Four to help fight off the Fused.

As the battle rages on, Kaladin successfully wounds Amaram with Rock delivering the final blow. After recovering the gemstone from Parshmen, Szeth allows Lift to venture into the mist and send the gemstone to Dalinar. With a heartfelt reconciliation, Dalinar uses the gemstone to contain the Thrill. With the Thrill gone and Odium mysteriously disappearing, the Parshmen army quickly retreats and the Knight radiants succeed in saving Thaylen City. With the battle over, Shallan becomes distorted by her split personality of Radiant and Veil with Adolin comforting her. With his new oaths fulfilled and new Spren bonded, Szeth part ways with Nale after gaining access to the Surge of Division and chooses to work as Dalinar's bodyguard. Taravangian confesses his betrayal to Dalinar, causing the latter to distrust him. In Kholinar, Moash follows the Fused instructions and kills a drunken street urchin who is revealed to be Jezrien, The King of Heralds. With Jezrien dead, Moash is granted Jezrien's Honorblade stolen from Bridge Four and goes by the new identity of Vyre, He Who Quiets. In Azir, Ash continues to escort Talenal to Ishar only to sense her father's death and fall unconscious for the first time in four thousand years. After arriving at Marat, Venli begins to ponder herself while learning about the Knights Radiant.

Eight days after the battle, Odium approaches Taravangian for betraying Dalinar and grows impressed by Taravangian's assumptions from the Diagram. Desperate for his illness and concerned for his grandchildren, Taravangian strikes a deal with Odium to spare Kharbranth in exchange for an alliance, to which Odium agrees. With Lopen promoted as second commander of Bridge Four and overhearing reports from the Spanreeds, Kaladin flies to Alethkar after taking a detour from Kharbranth and reunites with Drehy and Skar who escaped Kholinar with Gavinor, Elhokar's heir.

After reviewing the map of Roshar with territories overtaken by Parshmen, Adolin refuses to take the Alethi throne and confesses Sadeas' murder to Dalinar believing that he violated his moral Alethi codes. With Dalinar refusing to accept the kingship of Alethkar, they voted for Jashnah as the newly crowned queen of Alethkar. While preparing for her marriage, Shallan reunites with her brothers to visit her wedding with Mraize sending the letter as promised and instructing her to find an Unmade who rebelled against Odium. With sudden relief from his experience, Dalinar began publishing his autobiographical memoir called Oathbringer, My Glory and My Shame with Navani's teaching on literacy.

=== Epilogue ===
A week after the Voidbringers conquer Kholinar, Wit plans to escape the city to avoid Odium's attention as he sneaks into the palace posing as a beggar and makes contact with a mysterious Cryptic promising to share the truth without any Fused noticing.

== Viewpoint characters ==
The primary chapters within the book are told from the viewpoint of several major characters, while the book's interludes are told from the viewpoint of other characters (not all of which repeat).

== Audiobook ==
The audiobook version of the book, published by Macmillan Audio, was released on the same day as the hardcover version, and is read by narrator team Michael Kramer and Kate Reading, who also read The Way of Kings and Words of Radiance, and several other books written by Sanderson.

A 6-part GraphicAudio version (dramatized adaptation) of Oathbringer was released from April to September 2018:

Oathbringer [Dramatized Adaptation]
Part	Publication Date	Ref
1	23 April 2018	
2	16 May 2018	
3	18 June 2018	
4	25 July 2018	
5	13 August 2018	
6	24 September 2018	

== Sequel ==
The fourth book in The Stormlight Archive series is titled Rhythm of War and its publication date was November 17, 2020. It takes place a year after the events of Oathbringer.

== Reception ==
Reception of the series was mostly positive. The A.V. Club reviewer Samantha Nelson describes the novel as both weighed down by its ambition and less complex than its predecessors. While reviews on Tor find the novel engaging, with Martin Cahill writing that "It is a triumph of a novel, and if you’ve enjoyed the first two, you’ll certainly enjoy Oathbringer." Publishers Weekly also described the novel in light of its relationship to other books in the series, writing, "Sanderson successfully balances introducing new elements and satisfactorily resolving some threads, leaving fans to eagerly await the next in the series." The review in Paste by Frannie Jackson compares the novel to the long-arc storytelling of Robert Jordan, describing the novel as "brimming with more than enough magic and mystery to tide readers over until the [fourth novel is published]."
