= Black Shield Maiden =

2024 fantasy novel by Willow Smith and Jess Hendel

- Author: Willow Smith & Jess Hendel
- Audio read by: Willow Smith
- Language: English
- Publisher: Del Rey Books
- Publication date: May 7, 2024
- Publication place: United States
- Media type: Print (hardcover), e-book, audiobook
- Pages: 467
- Website: https://blackshieldmaiden.com/

Black Shield Maiden is a 2024 historical fantasy novel by Willow Smith and Jess Hendel. The novel follows Yafeu, a Ghanaian warrior, who is kidnapped from her home and taken to Viking Age Scandinavia where she ultimately becomes a shield-maiden in service to a local princess. Smith stated that she was inspired to write the book while watching the TV series Vikings and wondering whether Vikings had ever interacted with Black and Brown people. She began to research individuals like Erik the Red and his companion, Thorhall the Hunter, who was described as having brown skin with African style hair. The novel was originally set to be published in October 2022 but was delayed after a preview attracted negative criticism due to its portrayal of Amazigh individuals.

Following the novel's publication in 2024, critics praised the novel as "well-researched" and injecting "refreshing" diversity into the Viking fantasy genre. In interviews following publication, Smith and Hendel have indicated that they hope to publish at least two sequels to the novel and turn the series into a trilogy.
