= Unshelved =

Webcomic series set in a library

- Author(s): Gene Ambaum (2/16/2002 through 9/11/2016); Bill Barnes (2/16/2002 through 4/29/2016)
- Illustrator(s): Chris Hallbeck (2/29/2016 through 9/11/2016); Bill Barnes (2/16/2002 through 2/28/2016)
- Website: http://www.unshelved.com/
- Current status/schedule: Concluded
- Launch date: February 16, 2002
- End date: November 9, 2016

Unshelved was a daily comic strip set in a public library. Published by Overdue Media, the webcomic was created by writer Gene Ambaum, a librarian, and co-writer/artist Bill Barnes, and appeared at the rate of a strip per day from February 16, 2002, through November 9, 2016, with a virtual circulation in excess of 45,000 readers via RSS feed, website and email subscription. Beginning on February 29, 2016, Chris Hallbeck took over as the illustrator. Hallbeck had previously been a guest illustrator for over a year. On April 29, Barnes announced that he had also left as co-writer of the strip. It is part of the Create a Comic Project. On October 10, 2016, it was announced that the final comic strip would be released on November 9. Bill Barnes returned to draw and co-author the final week of strips.
