= Michael Kramer (narrator) =

American audiobook narrator

- Born: Minnesota, United States
- Occupation: Audiobook narrator

Michael Kramer is an American audiobook narrator. Kramer has recorded over a hundred audiobooks for trade publishers and has participated in the Library of Congress's Talking Books program.

== Reception and awards ==
Kramer has received praise for his narrations, with the Library Journal stating that Kramer reads "clearly and intensely".

=== Awards ===
- AudioFile Earphones Award
- Torgi Award

== Personal life ==
Kramer lives in the Washington, D.C., area with his wife, Jennifer Mendenhall (aka Kate Reading), and their two children. Kramer and Reading have co-narrated audiobooks. Kramer also works as an actor in the local theater, including The Kennedy Center's production of The Light of Excalibur.

== Bibliography ==
=== As narrator ===
- The Day After Tomorrow (1994)
- Homeland (1994)
- Closing Time (1995)
- Colin Powell: Soldier/Statesman- Statesman/Soldier (1995)
- Galatea 2.2 (1995)
- In the Big Country (1995)
- Tom Clancy's Op-Center - 12 Books (1995-2005)
- Capone: The Man and the Era Part I (1996)
- The Eye of the World (1996) with Kate Reading
- The Great Hunt (1997) with Kate Reading
- The Dragon Reborn (1997) with Kate Reading
- The Shadow Rising (1997) with Kate Reading
- The Fires of Heaven (1997) with Kate Reading
- Zen and The Art of Motorcycle Maintenance (1997)
- Lord of Chaos (1998) with Kate Reading
- A Crown of Swords (1998) with Kate Reading
- The Hot Rock (1998)
- The Path of Daggers (1999) with Kate Reading
- Comeback (1999)
- Winter's Heart (2000) with Kate Reading
- All on Fire (2001)
- Best of Mysteries (2001)
- Burn Factor (2001)
- The Dame (2001)
- Bad News (2002)
- The Black Bird (2002)
- Butcher's Moon (2002)
- Cheyenne Raiders (2002)
- Day of Confession (2002)
- Deadly Edge (2002)
- Firebreak (2002)
- The Good German (2002)
- Heaven and Hell (2002)
- The Jugger (2002)
- The Call of the Wild (2003)
- Crossroads of Twilight (2003) with Kate Reading
- Fatal (2003)
- Jennifer Government (2003)
- New Spring (2004) with Kate Reading
- Choice Cuts (2005)
- The Inner Circle (2005)
- Broken Windows, Broken Business (2006)
- Heat (2006)
- Knife of Dreams (2006) with Kate Reading
- Triptych (2006)
- The Attributes of God (2007)
- The Enemy at Home (2007)
- The Gettysburg Gospel (2007)
- Last Flag Down (2007)
- The Devil You Know (2008)
- Fidelity (2008)
- Gomorrah (2008)
- Mistborn: The Hero of Ages (2008)
- Chasing Daylight (2009)
- A Darkness Forged in Fire (2009)
- Death Benefits (2009)
- The Gathering Storm (2009) with Kate Reading
- Mistborn: The Final Empire (2009)
- Mistborn: The Well of Ascension (2009)
- Great Lives: Joseph (2009)
- Dead Aim (2010)
- Galveston (2010)
- Great Lives: David (2010)
- The Untold Story of the New Testament (2010)
- The Way of Kings (2010) with Kate Reading
- Towers of Midnight (2010) with Kate Reading
- How to Disappear: Erase Your Digital Footprint, Leave False Trails, and Vanish Without a Trace (2010)
- Mistborn: The Alloy of Law (2011)
- The Dinosaur Hunter (2011)
- The Informant (2011)
- The Gambler (2011)
- Desert Solitaire (2012)
- The Escape Artists (2012)
- Ice Fire (2012)
- A Memory of Light (2013) with Kate Reading
- Words of Radiance (2014) with Kate Reading
- Circle of Reign (2014)
- Astoria (2014)
- The Shadow of What Was Lost (2015)
- The Grace of Kings (2015)
- Chaos Theory (2015)
- Mistborn: Shadows of Self (2015)
- A Gathering of Shadows (2016)
- Conspiracy Theory (2016)
- Conversion Theory (2016)
- Mistborn: The Bands of Mourning (2016)
- Arcanum Unbounded: The Cosmere Collection (2016)
- Never Split the Difference: Negotiating as if Your Life Depended on It (2016)
- A Conjuring of Light (2017)
- Graveyard Shift (2017)
- An Echo of Things to Come (2017)
- Oathbringer (2017) with Kate Reading
- Kiss the Girls (1995), Audio Book (2018)
- Seeing like a State (1998), Audio Book (2018)
- Shadow of the Conqueror Chronicles of Everfall Book 1 (2019)
- The Light of All That Falls (2019)
- Rhythm of War (2020) with Kate Reading
- Breach of Peace (2021)
- Mistborn: The Lost Metal (2022)
- Tress of the Emerald Sea (2023)
- The Frugal Wizard’s Handbook for Surviving Medieval England (2023)
- Yumi and the Nightmare Painter (2023) with Kate Reading
- Wind and Truth (2024) with Kate Reading
- Tailored Realities (2025) with André Santana, Avi Roque, Dion Graham, Dylan Reilly Fitzpatrick, Imani Jade Powers, January LaVoy, MacLeod Andrews, Ray Porter, Shahjehan Khan, and Stephanie Németh-Parker.
