= Words of Radiance =

2014 novel by Brandon Sanderson

- First edition book cover
- Author: Brandon Sanderson
- Illustrator: Isaac Stewart; Ben McSweeney; Dan dos Santos
- Cover artist: Michael Whelan
- Language: English
- Series: The Stormlight Archive
- Release number: 2
- Genre: Epic fantasy
- Publisher: Tor Books
- Publication date: March 4, 2014
- Publication place: United States
- Media type: Print (hardcover and paperback), audiobook, e-book
- Pages: 1087 (hardcover)
- ISBN: 978-0-7653-2636-2
- OCLC: 889161015
- Dewey Decimal: 813/.6
- LC Class: PS3619.A533 W67 2014
- Preceded by: The Way of Kings
- Followed by: Oathbringer

Words of Radiance is an epic fantasy novel written by American author Brandon Sanderson and the second book in The Stormlight Archive series. The novel was published on March 4, 2014, by Tor Books. Words of Radiance consists of one prologue, 89 chapters, an epilogue and 14 interludes. It is preceded by The Way of Kings (2010) and followed by Oathbringer (2017).

In 2015, it won the David Gemmell Legend Award for best novel. The unabridged audiobook is read by narrator team Michael Kramer and Kate Reading.

== Development ==
The release of the book was delayed due to Sanderson's commitment to writing the final book of The Wheel of Time.

Initially, Sanderson planned that this volume would be named after the tome Shallan is given at the end of the first volume: The Book of Endless Pages. However, the name was changed after the editor commented "Uh, are you sure you want to name a very long, very thick fantasy book The Book of Endless Pages?” The book, at 1088 pages, was the maximum printable size of a book for its publisher, Tor Books, making it the biggest book printed by the company up to that point.

On July 1, 2013, Sanderson announced on his official Twitter account that he had finished the first draft of Words of Radiance. On July 3, Tor Books officially released an early excerpt of the novel, containing the beginning of an interlude starring Taravangian, the King of Kharbranth. On December 10, 2013, Tor Books announced on its official website that Sanderson had turned in the manuscript of the book, commenting that production could now begin. On the same day a second excerpt of the novel was released, containing an interlude starring the new character Lift.

On December 30, 2013, Tor Books revealed the endpapers for Words of Radiance, painted by American artist Michael Whelan. It pictures Shallan while painting at the Shattered Plains. In the same article Whelan states, "When Irene Gallo proposed a second painting for Words of Radiance, I immediately knew it was Shallan we were talking about. Indeed, like many fans, I had felt that the story was becoming as much Shallan's as Kaladin's; she merited equal representation in the book's design, as far as it was possible to do so."

On January 8, 2014, Tor Books released the prologue and first two chapters of the book as previews with points-of-view of Jasnah, Shallan and Kaladin. A week later, on January 14, Tor Books released the 3rd, 4th and 5th chapters of the book, followed by the 6th, 8th and 9th chapters on January 21. The last chapters to be released before the publication of the book, Chapters Ten, Twelve, Fourteen and the first Interlude, were released on January 28, 2014.

Tor Books revealed the dates and locations for the Words of Radiance book tour on January 29, 2014. On February 4, 2014, Tor announced 'The Glimpses of Radiance', a series of daily previews of the book running from February 11 to March 4, 2014. Non-spoiler reviews were released by Alice Arneson and Carl Engle-Laird on the Tor website and by 17thshard.com, the official fansite of Brandon Sanderson, 17th Shard calling the book, "truly an achievement. It expands on its predecessor, fulfilling the promises it sets up, and manages to surpass it". Samples of interior art painted by Ben McSweeney and Isaac Stewart were released on February 26.

== Plot ==
=== Prologue ===
At the Alethi peace treaty conference with the Parshendi, Jasnah Kholin first encounters the realm of Shadesmar, where she discovers the power to Soulcast. Jasnah then witnesses Szeth assassinate her father, King Gavilar Kholin. The Parshendi confess that they were behind the assassination, fearing Gavilar's plan. This motivates Jasnah to investigate the Parshendi's history, her experience in Shadesmar, and the Last Desolation.

=== Part One ===
Jasnah and Shallan Davar travel by ship to the Shattered Plains. Jasnah convinces her mother Navani to have Shallan betrothed to Adolin. Shallan meets and befriends a spren that she names Pattern and begins to manifest her own abilities. En route, their ship is attacked by assassins and Jasnah is seemingly killed. Shallan manages to escape and to recover Jasnah's research notes. She resolves to continue their mission to the Shattered Plains with their discovery of the Voidbringers' true nature: that the Parshendi and Voidbringers are one and the same.

After rescuing Dalinar Kholin, Kaladin and his former Bridgemen are named royal bodyguards assigned to protect House Kholin, including King Elhokar. Kaladin struggles with his hatred for lighteyes. Kaladin also begins training to master the powers of a Windrunner and exploring the bond with his Honorspren, Syl. Despite being a "darkeyes," Kaladin is allowed to join many of Dalinar's strategy meetings in his capacity as a bodyguard. The situation complicates when Brightlord Amaram arrives to support Dalinar's plan of uniting the Highprinces.

Dalinar begins finding cryptic messages scrawled in his chambers that count down to "the Everstorm." Dalinar decides to restore the Knights Radiant, and to be more aggressive with the other Highprinces. He gives his son Adolin permission to duel other lighteyes for their Shards, hoping to weaken his rivals.

In the Parshendi village of Narak, the researcher Venli discovers a new "form" that Parshendi could transform into. Venli claims it would be capable of summoning powerful storms as weapons against the Alethi. Despite fears from some that using Stormform would summon Voidspren, evil "opposites" to normal spren, the Parshendi ruling council reluctantly allow Venli to experiment with it. Venli's sister Eshonai, the last Parshendi Shardbearer and leader of their warriors, would rather parlay with Dalinar to end the war peacefully, but volunteers to become the first Stormform.

=== Part Two ===
During a duel, Adolin successfully defeats an opponent and begins winning shards for Dalinar.

Kaladin privately confesses Amaram's betrayal to Dalinar, who does not act on it. During training with Swordmaster Zahel, Kaladin and the crew are instructed in basic horsemanship, and how to defend against Shardblades in case of an attack by the Assassin in White (Szeth).

Meanwhile, Shallan deals with a bandit attack. She confronts a group of Alethi deserters and convinces them to defeat the bandits. Shallan befriends Tyn, a wandering conwoman who begins teaching her con-artistry. Shallan eventually discovers that Tyn was behind the assassination on Jasnah just as Tyn discovers Shallan's identity. Shallan reveals herself to be a Shardbearer, killing Tyn with her Shardblade. She then assumes Tyn's identity, planning to meet with the Ghostbloods, a secret organization behind many of the political upheavals in the realms.

A seemingly crazed man arrives in the camp and is taken in by Dalinar. He is actually Taln, the Herald of War, who was left behind by the other Heralds at the opening of the series.

Kaladin and Syl sense Szeth's approach and Dalinar, Adolin, and Kaladin fight the Assassin In White but are outmatched by him. Szeth attempts to kill Dalinar, his target, but is unsuccessful. During the fight, Szeth witnesses Kaladin using Stormlight and flees: Szeth was banished from his kingdom for claiming that the Radiants were coming back, and Kaladin being able to use Stormlight proves that he was right the whole time and should never have been banished.

Eshonai enters a highstorm which turns her into Stormform: turning her eyes red and making her adopt a much more aggressive, vengeful personality. This form is assumed to be the "voidbringer" form given to the Parshendi by their evil god Odium, who they hate and fear. In Narak, Eshonai, driven insane by Stormform, takes over the city with her troops and plans to transform them all into Stormform to wipe out the Alethi. She imprisons any who dissent all while her inner voice screams at her to stop.

=== Part Three ===
Shallan arrives at the Shattered Plains. She attends a meeting of the Ghostbloods while concealing her identity, hoping to learn more about the legendary city of the Radiants, Urithiru, as well as the Voidbringers. The Ghostbloods instruct Shallan to infiltrate Amaram's compound, believing that he knows secrets about the Parshendi and the Shattered Plains. Shallan manages to memorize and recreate all of his research. Upon meeting Amaram, she recognizes Amaram's Shardblade as her brother's old blade, and learns that her brother was killed in battle.

Kaladin continues his training with the Bridgemen. Moash, Kaladin's best friend, reveals his past and resentment towards Elhokar, blaming the king for the death of his grandparents. Moash invites Kaladin to attend a meeting of conspirators who plan to assassinate the king. Graves, leader of the assassins, insists that they are patriots determined to stabilize Alethkar by removing Elhokar from the throne due to his lack of leadership. Kaladin agrees that Elhokar is a bad king, and that the realm would probably be better without him.

Adolin goads one of the Highprinces' sons into a duel, saying he can bring another opponent, making it a 2 on 1 duel. However, Adolin fails to specify the number of challengers, forcing him to face four Shardbearers. Kaladin and Renarin are allowed to assist, and they successfully defeat the four, winning a boon from the King. Adolin invokes the right of challenge against Sadeas, the highprince who is most overtly against Dalinar. Kaladin, however, uses this boon to challenge Amaram, publicly accusing him of treason. An enraged Elhokar has Kaladin arrested. Using this as a distraction, Sadeas escapes before they can make him duel Adolin in the moment. He accepts the challenge, but sets the date for a year in the future.

Szeth isolates himself in a tower and questions his motives for killing before returning to Taravangian, who tricks him into thinking that Kaladin is not a Radiant, and must have instead stolen an Honorblade (which bestows the powers of a Surgebinder). Szeth renews his plan to kill Dalinar.

=== Part Four ===
Dalinar visits Kaladin while the latter is imprisoned and informs him that Moash's parents died not because of Elhokar, but because of Roshone, the same lighteyes who forced Kal's brother Tien to be drafted to war where he later died. When released, Kal learns that Adolin demanded to be imprisoned himself to convince Elhokar to release Kaladin, softening Kaladin's distrust toward Adolin and Lighteyes in general. Adolin offers Kaladin one of the Blades and Plate won in the duel, and Kaladin gives them to Moash.

When the Alethi army under Dalinar goes to explore the Shattered Plains, an assassination attempt orchestrated by Sadeas causes both Shallan and Kaladin to fall into a chasm. They survive using their Stormlight, but then Kaladin's connection to Syl, and Stormlight, is cut off. He believes that he killed Syl by forsaking his "protection" vow, as he is planning to turn a blind eye to the king's assassination.

During their time in the chasm, Kal and Shallan realize how much strife the other has gone through and begin to bond. They are ambushed by a chasmfiend, which Kaladin kills using Shallan's Shardblade, though he greatly injures his leg. They shelter from a high storm together and survive, bonding further.

Dalinar prepares to make his assault against the Parshendi on Narak. Shallan insists on going, having started mapping out the Plains while exploring the chasms.

Taravangian, who had made a deal with the Nightmother for "capacity" to stop the coming crisis oscillates daily between different levels of intelligence. It is revealed that many of his actions, including using Szeth to depose various rulers, were the result of the Diagram, a plan he mapped out on the most intelligent day he has ever had. Following the Diagram, Taravingian treats the wounded on both sides of a war that he caused, winning the support of the enemy soldiers, and becomes King of Jah Keved. As a result of the political turmoil the assassinations cause, riots erupt around the realm, including in Kholinar, the capital city of Alethkar, when Elhokar's wife Aesudan Kholin, orders the execution of the young ardent who questioned their faith.

=== Part Five ===
Highprinces Roion, Sebarial, and Aladar join Dalinar's mission. Before embarking, Dalinar exposes Amaram's deception in lying about how he obtained the Shardblade and killed Kaladin's men. Humiliated, Amaram leaves in disgrace. This further cements Kaladin's loyalty to Dalinar.

Reunited with Bridge Four with a new form, Rlain (previously called Shen, the one parshman on Bridge Four) informs Dalinar about his people using the Everstorm to crush the army and pleads with him to stop them.

Eshonai and her troops summon the Everstorm, killing many. Adolin leads a group of soldiers on an ambush of the Parshendi and defeats Eshonai, pushing her off into the chasm. During the battle, Adolin encounters Szeth, who is on his way towards Dalinar.

Back in camp, Kaladin tries to recover and continue to train himself despite his injured leg. He agonizes over the choice to either protect Elhokar which he thinks is right, or let him die, which he thinks is better for the realm. Kaladin resolves to save the king when Moash and Graves, covered in Shardplate, corner them. Refusing to deny his revenge on Elhokar, Moash turns on Kaladin and mortally wounds him. Kaladin refuses to give up, and speaks the Third Ideal. Syl defies the Stormfather to reunite with Kaladin. Kaladin summons Syl in the form of a glowing Shardblade which can change form as he needs, and his Surgebinding is restored. Moash and Graves flee, revealing that they know of Taravingian's Diagram.

After the Parshendi are defeated, Szeth overpowers Adolin and clashes with Dalinar, who is using Talenel's Shardblade, which he had bonded. Szeth defeats Dalinar and lashes him to the sky to fall to his death. Kaladin arrives in a burst of light, saving Dalinar and confronting Szeth. As Kaladin and Szeth clash in the storms above, Dalinar and his army quickly evacuate into Narak to avoid further casualties from the Everstorm. During the duel, Szeth severs his bond with his Honorblade, giving up due to him realizing that Kaladin truly is a Radiant, and Szeth never had to follow orders to kill innocent people. The Honorblade had given Szeth his Windrunning powers due to it being the former weapon of the Herald Jezrien, and Kaladin watches in shock as Szeth falls to his apparent death within the Everstorm.

Meanwhile, Shallan and the scholars find the center of Narak and the Oathgate, a teleportation system used by the Radiants. Shallan uses her Surgebinding and Shardblade to activate the Oathgate, and transports everyone to Urithuru.

It is revealed that Shallan used her Surgebinding as a child and, because of her powers, her mother tried to kill her. Shallan killed her mother in self-defense and her father took the blame, eventually driving him mad. The Ghostbloods discover Shallan's true identity and offer her a spot in their organization.

Dalinar confronts the Stormfather, who reveals himself as a Spren and binds himself to Dalinar, making Dalinar a Radiant of the Bondsmith order. As the known Radiants gather: Shallan, Dalinar, and Kaladin, Renarin arrives and reveals himself as a Truthwatcher, another Order, and presumably that he was the one writing messages on Dalinar's wall. Kaladin departs to Hearthstone to check on his parents and his townsfolk. Adolin, fed up with Sadeas' treachery kills Sadeas after a short struggle and throws away his father's Shardblade, Oathbringer.

It is revealed that the Everstorm will now circle the planet just like the highstorm, and that any parshmen caught in them will turn into Stormform.

Szeth awakes fully healed and meets the executioner named Nale, Herald of Justice and leader of the Skybreakers. Nale gives Szeth a new Shardblade/spren known as Nightblood to fulfill his path of justice and makes him a Radiant as well.

=== Epilogue ===
In the epilogue, Jasnah is revealed to have survived by escaping to Shadesmar, and is met by Hoid. Upon her arrival, Hoid offers Jasnah an alliance.

== Reception ==
=== Critical response and sales ===
In its first week of release, Words of Radiance debuted at No. 1 on the New York Times Hardcover Fiction Bestseller list. It also reached No. 1 on the combined print/ebook bestseller list and the Kobo Bestseller list. It was at No. 3 on the National Indie Bestseller list, and at No. 6 on the Southern California Independent Bookseller Association bestselling hardcover fiction list. The UK publisher of the book, Gollancz, debuted with Words of Radiance at No. 2 on the Sunday Times of London Bestseller list.

A review written by Rob Bricken of io9 called the book an old-school, "90s fantasy-style behemoth", also commenting, "While Sanderson continues to build his characters and reveal who they are (especially in the case of Shallan's past) it still clings to one overarching plot that drives relentlessly to an ending that can only be described as 'epic'."

The Lincoln Journal Star called the book "an extremely satisfying read that shows what the beginning of an epic fantasy series should look like."

=== Awards and nominations ===
Year	Award	Category	Result	Ref
2014	Whitney Awards	Best Speculative Fiction	Won	
2014	Goodreads Choice Awards	Best Fantasy Novel	Nominated	
2015	Audie Award	Best Fantasy (audiobook)	Won	
2015	David Gemmell Legend Award	Best Novel	Won	

== Audiobook ==
An audiobook version was released by Macmillan Audio on the same day as the hardcover version read by narrator team Kate Reading and Michael Kramer, who also read The Way of Kings.

A 5-part GraphicAudio version (dramatized adaptation) of Words of Radiance was released from September 2016 to January 2017:

Words of Radiance [Dramatized Adaptation]
Part	Publication Date	Ref
1	9 September 2016	
2	17 October 2016	
3	13 December 2016	
4	26 December 2016	
5	30 January 2017	

== Sequel ==
The third book in the series, Oathbringer, was released on November 14, 2017.
