= Jennifer Mendenhall =

American actress and audiobook narrator

Jennifer Mendenhall (born February 7, 1960), commonly known by the alias Kate Reading, is an American actress and audiobook narrator. She has won 6 Audie Awards and 46 Earphone Awards.

== Personal life ==
Mendenhall was born on February 7, 1960, in Brooklyn, New York. Her parents moved to England when she was a baby. In 1978, she returned to the United States to attend the University of Virginia. She graduated with a Bachelor of Arts in French and Drama in 1983.

Mendenhall married Michael Kramer on October 24, 1992. They currently live in the Washington, D.C., area with their two children.

== Awards and honors ==
=== Awards ===
| Year | Title | Award | Result | Ref. |
|---|---|---|---|---|
| 1999 | Summer Sisters (1998) by Judy Blume | Audie Award for Fiction | Finalist | |
| 2004 | Blow Fly by Patricia Cornwell | Audie Award for Best Female Narrator | Finalist | |
| 2006 | Fairy Tales (1835) by Hans Christian Andersen, translated by Tina Nunnally | Audie Award for Short Stories or Collections | Finalist | |
| 2007 | The Painted Veil (1925) by W. Somerset Maugham | Audie Award for Literary Fiction or Classics | Finalist | |
| 2010 | Bellwether (1996) by Connie Willis | Audie Award for Science Fiction | Winner | |
| 2010 | The Gathering Storm (2009) by Robert Jordan and Brandon Sanderson | Audie Award for Science Fiction | Finalist | |
| 2011 | Among the Missing (2011) by Morag Joss | Earphone Award | Winner | |
| 2011 | The Book of Spies by Gayle Lynds | Audie Award for Thriller or Suspense | Finalist | |
| 2012 | 1222 (2011) by Anne Holt | Earphone Award | Winner | |
| 2012 | The Boy in the Snow (2012) by M.J. McGrath | Earphone Award | Winner | |
| 2012 | The Thirteen Hallows (2011) by Michael Scott and Colette Freedman | Earphone Award | Winner | |
| 2012 | Trapeze (2012) by Simon Mawer | Earphone Award | Winner | |
| 2013 | Breasts by Florence Williams | Audie Award for Nonfiction | Winner | |
| 2013 | The Last Runaway (2013) by Tracy Chevalier | Earphone Award | Winner | |
| 2013 | A Memory of Light (2013) by Robert Jordan and Brandon Sanderson | Earphone Award | Winner | |
| 2014 | Words of Radiance (2014) by Brandon Sanderson | Earphone Award | Winner | |
| 2015 | My Life in Middlemarch by Rebecca Mead | Audie Award for Autobiography or Memoir | Winner | |
| 2015 | The Siege Winter (2015) by Ariana Franklin and Samantha Norman | Earphone Award | Winner | |
| 2015 | Words of Radiance (2014) | Audie Award for Fantasy | Winner | |
| 2016 | The Story of Egypt: The Civilization That Shaped the World (2016) by Joann Fletcher | Earphone Award | Winner | |
| 2016 | A Study in Scarlet Women (2016) by Sherry Thomas | Earphone Award | Winner | |
| 2016 | The Velvet Hours (2016) by Alyson Richman | Earphone Award | Winner | |
| 2017 | A Conspiracy in Belgravia (2017) by Sherry Thomas | Earphone Award | Winner | |
| 2017 | A Duke in Shining Armor: Difficult Dukes (2017) by Loretta Chase | Earphone Award | Winner | |
| 2017 | The Glass Town Game (2017) by Catherynne M. Valente | Earphone Award | Winner | |
| 2018 | The Strange Case of the Alchemist's Daughter (2017) by Theodora Goss | Audie Award for Fantasy | Winner | |
| 2018 | The Tangled Lands (2010) by Paolo Bacigalupi and Tobias S. Buckell | Earphone Award | Winner | |
| 2018 | When a Duke Loves a Woman (2018) by Lorraine Heath | Earphone Award | Winner | |
| 2019 | The Art of Theft (2019) by Sherry Thomas | Earphone Award | Winner | |
| 2019 | At the End of the Century (2019) by Ruth Prawer Jhabvala | Earphone Award | Winner | |
| 2020 | Death and the Maiden (2020) by Samantha Norman and Ariana Franklin | Earphone Award | Winner | |
| 2019 | European Travel for the Monstrous Gentlewoman by Theodora Goss | Audie Award for Fantasy | Finalist | |
| 2020 | Midnight Train to Prague (2020) by Carol Windley | Earphone Award | Winner | |
| 2020 | The Prophet (1923) by Kahlil Gibran | Earphone Award | Winner | |
| 2020 | Rhythm of War (2020) by Brandon Sanderson | Earphone Award | Winner | |
| 2020 | Ten Things I Hate About the Duke (2020) by Loretta Chase | Earphone Award | Winner | |
| 2022 | Rhythm of War (2020) by Brandon Sanderson | Audie Award for Fantasy | Winner | |
| 2021 | The Souvenir Museum (2021) by Elizabeth McCracken | Earphone Award | Winner | |

=== "Best of" lists ===
| Year | Title | Award | Ref. |
|---|---|---|---|
| 2008 | Captain's Fury | AudioFile Best Fantasy of the Year | |
| 2009 | Cursor's Fury | AudioFile Best Fantasy of the Year | |
| 2010 | Bright-Sided | AudioFile Best Contemporary Culture of the Year | |
| 2012 | Bling Goddess | AudioFile Best Mystery & Suspense of the Year | |
| 2012 | Mischief of the Mistletoe by Lauren Willig | RUSA Listen List | |
| 2013 | The Garden Intrigue (2013) by Lauren Willig | RUSA Listen List | |
| 2015 | Gretel and the Case of the Missing Frog Prints | AudioFile Best Mystery & Suspense of the Year | |
| 2015 | Lord of Scoundrels by Loretta Chase | RUSA Listen List | |
| 2016 | And Only to Deceive by Tasha Alexander | RUSA Listen List | |
| 2017 | A Conspiracy in Belgravia | AudioFile Best Mystery & Suspense of the Year | |

== Stage performances ==
Performances listed alphabetically by show
| Show | Role | Company |
|---|---|---|
| After the Fall | Holga | Theater J |
| Andy and the Shadows | Raya | Theater J |
| Angels in America: Millennium Approaches | Ethel Rosenberg, Rabbi Chemelwitz, Hannah Pitt | Forum Theatre |
| Angels in America: Perestroika | Ethel Rosenberg, Hannah Pitt | Forum Theatre |
| Apples from the Desert | Victoria | Theater J |
| A Beautiful View | Lane | Studio Theatre |
| Cherokee | Janine | Woolly Mammoth Theatre Company |
| Circle Mirror Transformation | Marty | Studio Theatre |
| Clybourne Park | Bev/Kathy | Woolly Mammoth Theatre Company |
| The Cripple of Inishmaan | Kate Osbourne | SCENA Theatre |
| Dead Man's Cell Phone | Other Woman | Woolly Mammoth Theatre Company |
| Grace | Sara | Woolly Mammoth Theatre Company |
| Homebody/Kabul | Mahala | Woolly Mammoth Theatre Company |
| Imagining Madoff | Secretary | Theater J |
| Legacy of Light | Wet Nurse, Olivia | Arena Stage |
| Lenny & Lou | Julie Riggio | Woolly Mammoth Theatre Company |
| Measure for Pleasure | Lady Vanity Lustforth | Woolly Mammoth Theatre Company |
| The New Electric Ballroom | Ada | Studio Theatre |
| Pluto | Elizabeth Miller | Forum Theatre |
| The Rocky Horror Show | Magenta | Woolly Mammoth Theatre Company |

== Filmography ==
| Year | Title | Role | Notes |
|---|---|---|---|
| 1991 | The Arc | Sally | |
| 1992 | Literary Visions | Actor | 1 episode: Artful Resonance: Theme in Poetry |
| 1994 | Homicide: Life on the Street | Kerry Weston | 1 episode: See No Evil |
| 1994 | Serial Mom | Reporter | |
| 1997 | Frontline | Self / Narration | 1 episode: The Lost American |
| 2013 | My Synthesized Life | Phone operator | 1 episode: Freak |
