= Brandon Sanderson bibliography =

This is the bibliography of American fantasy and science fiction writer Brandon Sanderson.

== Cosmere ==
Many of Sanderson's works are set on different planets in an overarching universe known as the Cosmere. They are often subtly connected, with some characters appearing across the various series.

=== Novels ===
==== Standalones ====
Title	Year	First edition publisher	Notes	Ref.
Elantris	2005	Tor Books		
Warbreaker	2009	Tor Books		
The Sunlit Man	2023	Dragonsteel Entertainment	Secret Project 4	
Isles of the Emberdark	2025	Dragonsteel Entertainment	Secret Project 5	

==== Mistborn ====
Title	Year	First edition publisher	Ref.
First Era
The Final Empire	2006	Tor Books	
The Well of Ascension	2007	Tor Books	
The Hero of Ages	2008	Tor Books	
Second Era
The Alloy of Law	2011	Tor Books	
Shadows of Self	2015	Tor Books	
The Bands of Mourning	2016	Tor Books	
The Lost Metal	2022	Tor Books	

==== The Stormlight Archive ====
Title	Year	First edition publisher	Ref.
First Arc
The Way of Kings	2010	Tor Books	
Words of Radiance	2014	Tor Books	
Oathbringer	2017	Tor Books	
Rhythm of War	2020	Tor Books	
Wind and Truth	2024	Tor Books	

==== Hoid’s Travails ====
Title	Year	First edition publisher	Notes	Ref.
Tress of the Emerald Sea	2023	Dragonsteel Entertainment	Secret Project 1	
Yumi and the Nightmare Painter	2023	Dragonsteel Entertainment	Secret Project 3	
The Fires of December	2026	Dragonsteel Entertainment	Secret Project 6	

=== Short works ===
Title	Year	Series or setting	Format	First edition publisher/publication	Notes	Ref.
The Hope of Elantris	2006	Elantris	Short story	Self-published	Collected in Arcanum Unbounded: The Cosmere Collection (2016).	
"The Eleventh Metal"	2011	Mistborn	Short story	Crafty Games	Published with the Mistborn Adventure Game. Collected in Arcanum Unbounded: The Cosmere Collection (2016).	
The Emperor's Soul	2012	Elantris	Novella	Tachyon Publications	Collected in Arcanum Unbounded: The Cosmere Collection (2016).	
Shadows for Silence in the Forests of Hell	2013	Threnody	Novella	Dangerous Women, edited by George R. R. Martin and Gardner Dozois. Tor Books	Printed as a standalone in 2015. Collected in Arcanum Unbounded: The Cosmere Collection (2016).	
Sixth of the Dusk	2014	First of the Sun	Novella	Shadows Beneath. Ebook, Dragonsteel Entertainment	Collected in Arcanum Unbounded: The Cosmere Collection (2016). Later reworked into a series of flashbacks within Isles of the Emberdark.	
"Allomancer Jak and the Pits of Eltania"	2014	Mistborn	Short story	Crafty Games	Part of the second "Mistborn" series. Published with the Mistborn Adventure Game. Collected in Arcanum Unbounded: The Cosmere Collection (2016).	
Secret History	2016	Mistborn	Novella	Ebook, Dragonsteel Entertainment	Collected in Arcanum Unbounded: The Cosmere Collection (2016).	
Arcanum Unbounded: The Cosmere Collection	2016	N/A	Collection	Tor Books		
Edgedancer	2016	The Stormlight Archive	Novella	Tor Books	First part appeared as Interlude I9 “Lift” in Words of Radiance (2014). Remainder appeared in Arcanum Unbounded: The Cosmere Collection (2016). Collected as a standalone in 2017.	
Dawnshard	2020	The Stormlight Archive	Novella	Ebook, Dragonsteel Entertainment	Published on February 15, 2022.	
Elsecaller	2024	The Stormlight Archive	Short story	Dragonsteel Entertainment	Released as part of Story Deck- a set of collectible cards. The two stories were collected into an Elsecaller/King Lopen double volume the following year.	
King Lopen the First of Alethkar	2024	The Stormlight Archive	Short story	Dragonsteel Entertainment	Released as part of Story Deck- a set of collectible cards. The two stories were collected into an Elsecaller/King Lopen double volume the following year.	

=== Graphic novels ===
Title	Year	Series or setting	Format	First edition publisher/publication	Notes	Ref.
White Sand I	2016	Taldain	Graphic novel	Dynamite Entertainment	Written with Rik Hoskin. Illustrated by Julius Gopez and colored by Ross Campbell.	
White Sand II	2018	Taldain	Graphic novel	Dynamite Entertainment	Written with Rik Hoskin. Illustrated by Julius Gopez.	
White Sand III	2019	Taldain	Graphic novel	Dynamite Entertainment	Written with Rik Hoskin. Illustrated by Fritz Casas.	
White Sand Omnibus	2022	Taldain	Collection	Dynamite Entertainment	Includes new prologue and glossary (Ars Arcanum).	

=== Story-Books and Picture Books ===
==== Hoid’s Storybook Collection ====
Title	Year of First Separate Publication	Format	First edition publisher/publication	Notes	Ref.
The Dog and the Dragon	2026	Picture book	Dragonsteel Entertainment	A definitive and non-diegetic version of a story which is found in The Stormlight Archive.	
Wandersail	2026	Picture book	Dragonsteel Entertainment	A definitive and non-diegetic version of a story which is found in The Stormlight Archive.	
The Girl Who Looked Up	2026	Picture book	Dragonsteel Entertainment	A definitive and non-diegetic version of a story which is found in The Stormlight Archive.	
The ChasmFriends Get a Pet	2026	Picture book	Dragonsteel Entertainment	A new non-canonical story set in the world of the The Stormlight Archive and featuring characters from Story Deck® at Dragonsteel Nexus 2024.	

== Alcatraz ==
Humorous fantasy adventure series for children.

Title	Year	Format	First edition publisher/publication	Notes	Ref.
Alcatraz Versus the Evil Librarians	2007	Novel	Scholastic Press		
Alcatraz Versus the Scrivener's Bones	2008	Novel	Scholastic Press		
Alcatraz Versus the Knights of Crystallia	2009	Novel	Scholastic Press		
Alcatraz Versus the Shattered Lens	2010	Novel	Scholastic Press		
Alcatraz Versus the Dark Talent	2016	Novel	Starscape		
Bastille Versus the Evil Librarians	2022	Novel	Starscape	Written with Janci Patterson.	

== Cytoverse ==
Young adult science fiction series.

Title	Year	Format	First edition publisher/publication	Notes	Ref.
"Defending Elysium"	2008	Short story	Asimov's Science Fiction, October/November 2008 issue. Dell Magazines	Printed by Ace Books in 2013. Collected in Tailored Realities (2025)	
Skyward	2018	Novel	Delacorte Press		
Starsight	2019	Novel	Delacorte Press		
Sunreach	2021	Novella	Ebook, Delacorte Press	Written with Janci Patterson. Reprinted in Skyward Flight: The Collection (2022).	
ReDawn	2021	Novella	Ebook, Delacorte Press	Written with Janci Patterson. Reprinted in Skyward Flight: The Collection (2022).	
Cytonic	2021	Novel	Delacorte Press		
Evershore	2021	Novella	Ebook, Delacorte Press	Written with Janci Patterson. Reprinted in Skyward Flight: The Collection (2022).	
Skyward Flight: The Collection	2022	Collection	Delacorte Press	Written with Janci Patterson.	
"Hyperthief"	2023	Short story	Dragonsteel Entertainment	Written with Janci Patterson.	
Defiant	2023	Novel	Delacorte Press		
Blightfall	2026	Novel	Delacorte Press	Written with Janci Patterson. Book one in the Riftwake series.	
Songrise	2027	Novel	Delacorte Press	Written with Janci Patterson. Book two in the Riftwake series.	

== The Wheel of Time ==
Sanderson was selected to continue Robert Jordan's fantasy series The Wheel of Time, after Jordan's death, by his editor and widow Harriet McDougal.

Title	Year	Format	First edition publisher/publication	Notes	Ref.
The Gathering Storm	2009	Novel	Tor Books	Co-authored by Robert Jordan.	
Towers of Midnight	2010	Novel	Tor Books	Co-authored by Robert Jordan.	
A Memory of Light	2013	Novel	Tor Books	Co-authored by Robert Jordan.	
"River of Souls"	2013	Short story	Unfettered, Grim Oak Press	edited by Shawn Speakman	
"A Fire Within the Ways"	2019	Short story	Unfettered III, Grim Oak Press	edited by Shawn Speakman	

== Legion ==
The Legion novellas are science fiction and center around Stephen Leeds as he investigates different mystery cases.

Title	Year	Format	First edition publisher/publication	Notes	Ref.
Legion	2012	Novella	Subterranean Press	Reprinted in Legion: The Many Lives of Stephen Leeds (2018).	
Legion: Skin Deep	2014	Novella	Subterranean Press	Reprinted in Legion: The Many Lives of Stephen Leeds (2018).	
Lies of the Beholder	2018	Novella	Subterranean Press	First published in Legion: The Many Lives of Stephen Leeds (2018).	
Legion: The Many Lives of Stephen Leeds	2018	Collection	Tor Books		
Stephen Leeds: Death and Faxes	2022	Audiobook	Recorded Books	Coauthored with Max Epstein, David Pace and Michael Harkins. The story takes place after "Skin Deep" and before "Lies of the Beholder".	

== The Reckoners ==
Young adult superhero adventure series.

Title	Year	Format	First edition publisher/publication	Notes	Ref.
Steelheart	2013	Novel	Delacorte Press		
"Mitosis"	2013	Short story	Delacorte Press	Collected in Tailored Realities (2025)	
Firefight	2015	Novel	Delacorte Press		
Calamity	2016	Novel	Delacorte Press		
Lux	2021	Audiobook	Audible Studios	Written with Steven Michael Bohls. Narrated by MacLeod Andrews.	

== Other works ==
Title	Year	Series	Format	First edition publisher/publication	Notes	Ref.
"Firstborn"	2008	N/A	Short story	Tor Books	A Tor.com original. Published as an ebook in 2010. Printed by Ace Books in 2013. Collected in Tailored Realities (2025)	
"I Hate Dragons"	2011	N/A	Short story	Self-published on Sanderson's website	Printed in the anthology Dragon Writers (2016), edited by Lisa Mangum. Collected in Tailored Realities (2025).	
Infinity Blade: Awakening	2011	Infinity Blade	Novella	Ebook, Chair Entertainment	Based on the action RPG video game Infinity Blade.	
Heuristic Algorithm and Reasoning Response Engine	2012	N/A	Novelette	Armored, edited by John Joseph Adams. Wake Forest, Baen Books	Written with Ethan Skarstedt.	
The Rithmatist	2013	Rithmatist	Novel	Tor Teen		
Infinity Blade: Redemption	2013	Infinity Blade	Novella	Ebook, Chair Entertainment	Based on the action RPG video game Infinity Blade.	
"Dreamer"	2014	N/A	Short story	Games Creatures Play, edited by Charlaine Harris and Toni L. P. Kelner. Ace Books	Collected in Tailored Realities (2025)	
Perfect State	2015	N/A	Novella	Ebook, Dragonsteel Entertainment	Collected in Tailored Realities (2025)	
Snapshot	2017	N/A	Novella	Dragonsteel Entertainment	Collected in Tailored Realities (2025)	
Children of the Nameless	2018	Magic: The Gathering	Novella	Wizards of the Coast	Printed by Subterranean Press in 2026	
The Original	2020	N/A	Audiobook	Recorded Books	Written with Mary Robinette Kowal. Narrated by Julia Whelan.	
The Way of Kings Prime	2020	Sanderson Curiosities	Novel	Dragonsteel Entertainment	A first draft of the novel published on Sanderson's website. A hardback version was released only to Kickstarter backers.	
Dark One	2021	Dark One	Graphic novel	Vault Comics	Written with Jackson Lanzing and Collin Kelly. Illustrated by Nathan C. Gooden and colored by Kurt Michael Russell.	
Dark One: Forgotten	2023	Dark One	Audiobook	Audible Studios	Audio-exclusive. Written with Dan Wells.	
The Frugal Wizard's Handbook for Surviving Medieval England	2023	N/A	Novel	Dragonsteel Entertainment	Secret Project 2	
"Long Chills and Case Dough"	2023	Sanderson Curiosities	Short story	Dragonsteel Entertainment	Published on Sanderson's website.	
The Most Boring Book Ever	2024	N/A	Picture Book	Roaring Brook Press	Pictures by Kazu Kibuishi	
"Dragonsteel Prime"	2024	Sanderson Curiosities	Novel	Dragonsteel Entertainment	Written as Sanderson's honors thesis at BYU, and published online. A hardback version and an audiobook version read by Michael Kramer and Kate Reading are also available.	
Tailored Realities	2025	Miscellaneous	Short Story Collection	Tor Books	Contains short stories set outside the Cosmere Universe such as Cytoverse, among others. Includes three previously unpublished works: Brain Dump (novella), "Probability Approaching Zero" (flash fiction) and Moment Zero (novella).	
Songs of the Dead	2026	The Strata Wars	Novel	S&S/Saga Press	Written with Peter Orullian	
