= Alcatraz Versus the Scrivener's Bones =

2008 juvenile fiction novel by Brandon Sanderson

- Cover of Alcatraz Versus the Scrivener's Bones, Brandon Sanderson's second in the series.
- Author: Brandon Sanderson
- Cover artist: Marc Tauss
- Language: English
- Series: Alcatraz Versus
- Genre: Fantasy novel
- Publisher: Scholastic Press
- Publication date: November 1, 2008 (first edition, hardback)
- Publication place: United States
- Media type: Print (Hardback)
- Pages: 336 pp (first edition, hardback)
- ISBN: 978-0-439-92553-2 (first edition, hardback)
- OCLC: 181335700
- LC Class: PZ7.S19797 Als 2008
- Preceded by: Alcatraz Versus the Evil Librarians
- Followed by: Alcatraz Versus the Knights of Crystallia

Alcatraz Versus the Scrivener's Bones is a juvenile fiction novel written by American author Brandon Sanderson, published in November 2008 by Scholastic Press. It is preceded by Alcatraz Versus the Evil Librarians.

== Plot summary ==
Alcatraz Versus the Scrivener's Bones is the second novel in the Alcatraz series. Sanderson continues the series as Alcatraz goes to the Library of Alexandria and tries to rescue his dad and grandfather from the soul stealing library curators. Once he arrives he is immediately separated from the rest of the group consisting of Bastille and her mother Draulin, Alcatraz's uncle Kazan, and Alcatraz's cousin Australia. Alcatraz is travelling through the library alone and he is often pestered by the curators who ask him to take a book at the cost of his soul. The curators speak long forgotten languages which he can understand because of his Translator's Lenses. At one point Alcatraz finds Bastille caught in a net, and he breaks the ropes that bind her. After Bastille and Alcatraz continue to venture Kazan finds them by utilizing his talent of getting lost. He finds them because they are both abstractly lost. Soon after the three travel the library with Kazan's talent they activate another trip wire which encloses them in a hardened goo. Alcatraz escapes by biting through it, and his friends follow suit. Along the way he finds the tomb of Alcatraz the first, who was the first wielder of the breaking talent. His tomb does not age because he broke time. At the tomb he also finds a note which informs him that his talent is more of a curse than a blessing. After activating yet a third trip wire Bastille and Alcatraz fall into a pit. After a lengthy (and awkward) discussion about responsibility, they escape using Windstormer's Lenses and proceed to fight the Scrivener's Bones—a sect of Dark Oculators. They defeat him by tricking him into checking out a book, then the curators take his soul. Later, they find Grandpa Smedry crying over a note. It is revealed that indeed, Attica Smedry (Alcatraz's father) has sold his soul for all the knowledge in the world. But, in claiming a note written before he was turned into a curator, Alcatraz learns of a way to turn him back.

== Characters ==
Australia (Alcatraz's cousin), ever present Bastille, Draulin (Bastille's mother and knight of Crystallia), and Kazan, or Kaz as he is often called (Alcatraz's uncle), join in the fight against the Librarians. Kilimanjaro, a Scrivener's Bone (a sect of cyborg-like Librarians who replace parts of their bodies with Alivened technology), attempts to capture Alcatraz and his clan throughout the book. Floating around the Library are the always-present Curators of Alexandria, who will let you pick up any book in the Library - at the cost of your soul.

== Sequels ==
- A third Alcatraz book, Alcatraz Versus the Knights of Crystallia, was published in 2009.
- A fourth book, Alcatraz Versus the Shattered Lens, was published in 2010.
- A fifth book, Alcatraz Versus the Dark Talent was published in 2016.
- A sixth book, Bastille vs. the Evil Librarians was published in 2022.

== Oculatory Lenses ==
In the books there are lenses that have special powers. Oculators are the only ones who have the ability to use the lenses. The lenses mentioned in the first two books in the series are:

- Oculator's Lenses, which highlight unusual objects and allow the wearer to see unusual things
- Firebringer's Lenses, which shoot heat rays
- Tracker's Lenses, which allow the wearer to see colored footprints; the longer you know a person or the closer their relation to you, the more brightly the prints appear and the longer the prints last
- Shocker's Lenses, which cause people to pass out
- Translator's Lenses (a/k/a the Lenses of Rashid), which allow the wearer to read or write in any language or code
- Torturer's Lenses, which allow the wearer to cause pain to any person they focus on
- Courier's Lenses, which carry messages to other Oculators
- Windstomer's Lenses, which can push objects with a gust of wind
- Voidstomer's Lenses, which manipulate air pressure to pull objects toward ithem
- Frostbringer's Lenses, which shoot a beam of icy frost
- Discerner's Lenses, which confer upon the wearer knowledge of the relative age of an object
- Harrier's Lenses, whose power is not yet shown at this point in the series
- Transcriber's Lenses, which confers upon the user comprehension of languages
- Truthfinder's Lenses, which exposes honesty and deception. This takes the form of a person's mouth overflowing with either mist in response to truth, or various bugs in response to lies.

Also mentioned is a method of making Lenses that can be used by non-Oculators. However, this method requires the blood of an Oculator obtained via sacrifice.
