= Cosmere Roleplaying Game =

Upcoming tabletop game by Brandon Sanderson

- Designers: Andrew Fischer
- Publishers: Brotherwise Games
- Publication: 2024
- Genres: Fantasy
- Systems: d20 System

The Cosmere Roleplaying Game is a tabletop role-playing game based on the Cosmere fictional universe created by American author Brandon Sanderson. Manufactured by Brotherwise Games, the game was first announced in November 2023 by Sanderson's publisher Dragonsteel Entertainment. A crowdfunding campaign was then launched on Kickstarter on August 6, 2024, raising a total of $14.7 million and becoming the most-funded tabletop game on the platform.

A digital version of The Stormlight Archive campaign setting was released in 2024, while a hardcover version came out in 2025. A Mistborn campaign setting was released in September 2026.

== Overview ==
=== The Stormlight Archive Campaign ===
In The Stormlight Archive Campaign, players would accompany Bridge 9 during the introduction of the gameplay, and the game uses a d20 system to determine the player's opportunities and challenges.

=== Mistborn Campaign ===
The Mistborn Campaign is based on the stories of Era 1 and Era 2. It will feature all sixteen metals and their respective Allomancy and Feruchemy powers, similar to a talent tree. Players would use their powers as investigators.

== Development ==
Following the release of the Mistborn Adventure Game, American fantasy author Brandon Sanderson expressed interest in producing a pen-and-paper role-playing game based on another novel series The Stormlight Archive. On September 20, 2022, Sanderson, Brotherwise Games' Johnny O'Neal, and illustrator Isaac Stewart teased the production of a role-playing game based on The Stormlight Archive and revealed videos of digital models of some characters' miniatures, with an expected release date of 2024. A crowdfunding campaign for premium miniatures was launched in October 2023 and raised over $4.1 million USD. Rewards including a full set of figurines and statues were shipped to backers prior to November 10. Also in November, Sanderson's publisher Dragonsteel Entertainment officially announced the production of a role-playing game based on The Stormlight Archive. A Mistborn-based deck-building game was also announced to be released by Brotherwise Games in the second half of 2024.

On August 6, 2024, a crowdfunding campaign of the role-playing game was launched on Kickstarter, revealing the game's title to be Cosmere Roleplaying Game, with Brotherwise Games and Dragonsteel announcing that they intended to produce the game with all stories set within Sanderson's Cosmere fictional universe. In an interview with ComicBook.com, O'Neal mentioned that the production of the upcoming third setting would likely be a Worldhopper campaign, which is about bringing all different fictional worlds in the universe together, and an Elantris campaign based on the upcoming sequels would also be made. The Kickstarter campaign raised over $2 million USD within hours of launch, and reached over $10.366 million on August 25, breaking the record set by Avatar Legends: The Roleplaying Game as the most-funded RPG on the platform and becoming the first tabletop RPG to surpass the $10 million mark in a crowdfunding campaign. It concluded with over $14.7 million from a total of 52,658 backers, surpassing Frosthaven to become the most-funded tabletop game on the platform.

== Release ==
A digital version of The Stormlight Archive campaign setting was released in 2024, while a hardcover version was released in September 2025. A Mistborn campaign setting is expected to be released in 2026.
