= Alcatraz Versus the Evil Librarians =

2007 novel by Brandon Sanderson

- Cover of Alcatraz Versus the Evil Librarians (Tor edition), Brandon Sanderson's first juvenile fiction novel.
- Author: Brandon Sanderson
- Illustrator: Hayley Lazo (Tor Edition)
- Cover artist: Marc Tauss (Scholastic Edition). Scott Brundage (Tor Edition)
- Language: English
- Series: Alcatraz Versus
- Genre: Fantasy novel
- Publisher: Scholastic Press (Later released by Tor Books)
- Publication date: October 1, 2007 (first edition, hardback). February 16, 2016 (Tor re-release)
- Publication place: United States
- Media type: Print (Hardback)
- Pages: 320 (first edition, hardback)
- ISBN: 0-439-92550-9 (first edition, hardback)
- OCLC: 78771100
- LC Class: PZ7.S19797 Alc 2007
- Followed by: Alcatraz Versus the Scrivener's Bones

Alcatraz Versus the Evil Librarians is a juvenile novel written by American author Brandon Sanderson, published in October 2007 by Scholastic Press. The book is named after its main character, Alcatraz Smedry.

== Plot summary ==
Alcatraz Smedry, a young teen, is always breaking things. After receiving a bag of sand for his thirteenth birthday, he is involved in a very strange set of events.

The book starts with Alcatraz setting fire to his foster parents' kitchen. It is revealed that he has been in countless foster homes, always ending up with Alcatraz "destroying" things precious to the people taking care of him. Ms. Fletcher, Alcatraz's personal caseworker, arrives and scolds him for destroying his foster parents' kitchen.

The next day an old man arrives at the house and claims to be his grandfather, telling Alcatraz that he has a special, powerful talent: breaking things. After the old man finds Alcatraz's bag of sand missing, he and Alcatraz must go on a mission to recover it at all cost from the Evil Librarians, secret rulers of the world.

== Characters ==
The plot revolves around the title character and a small group of freedom fighters operating against the cult of evil librarians that secretly rule the world. These freedom fighters include Alcatraz's grandfather, Leavenworth Smedry, usually just referred to as "Grandpa Smedry"; Bastille, Grandpa's bodyguard and a Crystin Knight; Sing Sing - Sing for short - Alcatraz's Mokian cousin; and Quentin, another cousin. The Librarians include Shasta / Ms. Fletcher, Alcatraz's case worker and Radrian Blackburn, a Dark Oculator.

== Smedry Talents ==
In the course of the book, it is revealed that Alcatraz's biological family, the Smedrys, all are born with unique talents that they use to combat the evil cult of librarians.

Alcatraz has the talent of breaking things.

Grandpa Smedry, Alcatraz's grandfather, has the power to arrive late to things. As such, he is always running behind the clock. But his power also allows him to arrive late to other things, like bullets, which always miss him, and his blood can arrive late to wounds so that he doesn't bleed to death. In his own words, "I've been arriving late to my own death for longer than you've been alive."

Alcatraz's cousin Sing's talent is the ability to trip and fall to the ground. This helps when this is a sign of danger.

Quentin, another cousin, has the talent to speak gibberish or nonsensical phrases. His talent proves beneficial when he is captured by the librarians, as they cannot understand him and thus cannot gain important information from him, even through torture. It is through some of Quentin's supposed gibberish that Alcatraz is prompted to know what to do in future events. And plus, he's a very good spy because of his talent.

Smedrys from ancient days had grand talents, though relatively unexplained. Libby Smedry could get unbelievable amounts of water on the ground when she did the dishes, which allowed her to end a drought. Another could make rude noises at inappropriate moments, breaking enemies' concentration so they could not use weapons.

If someone not related to the Smedrys marries a Smedry, the person marrying into the family gets their spouse's Talent.

== Sequels ==
Alcatraz Versus the Scrivener's Bones, the second book in the series, was released in the United States November 1, 2008. A third Alcatraz book, called Alcatraz Versus the Knights of Crystallia, was released on October 1, 2009, and the fourth book, Alcatraz Versus the Shattered Lens, was released on December 1, 2010. Since Scholastic only commissioned the first four books, and was unwilling to publish the fifth book, Sanderson bought back the rights to the series in early 2013. He later sold the series to Tor Books who then republished the series. The fifth book of the series, entitled The Dark Talent, was released September 6, 2016. Tor Books reprinted the first five books in a paperback box set, then published the sixth book in the series, Bastille vs. the Evil Librarians, on September 20, 2022, which was co-authored by Janci Patterson.

== Film adaptations ==
DreamWorks Animation acquired the film rights to Alcatraz Versus the Evil Librarians in June 2008. On January 3, 2011, Brandon Sanderson, the author of the novel, tweeted that DreamWorks did not renew the rights.
