= Rithmatist (series) =

Young adult fantasy series by Brandon Sanderson

The Rithmatist series is a young adult fantasy series written by American author Brandon Sanderson. At least two books are planned in the series: The Rithmatist (2013) and a second volume, titled The Aztlanian, is planned.

== Setting ==
The world in which The Rithmatist is set is similar to the recent past of our own but with complex geared machinery, known as "springwork", taking the role of technologies that would, in reality, usually be powered by electricity or steam.

At 8 years old, children undergo a religious ceremony known as Inception, during which the child's fate is decided: fewer than 1 in 1000 are chosen to become Rithmatists.

Rithmatists are warriors. They use geometric patterns of chalk (Lines) to perform magic with physical effects. Lines may shield a user, attack an opponent or animate a creature known as a Chalkling which will do the Rithmatist's bidding.

Rithmatists are humanity's primary defence against the mysterious Wild Chalklings. After graduating, a Rithmatist is expected to spend time in Nebrask actively using their gift and training to wage war, protecting the United American Isles from the threat of Wild Chalklings escaping The Tower.

The story mainly takes place at Armedius Academy, one of 8 schools that trains and teaches Rithmatists, alongside non-Rithmatists with rich or important families.

== Plot ==
The Rithmatist follows the story of Joel, a teenage boy who is enrolled at and lives on the campus of Armedius Academy. He is not a Rithmatist, yet is interested in the study of Rithmatist power. Joel, eager to know more about Rithmatics, helps a professor at Armedius Academy when students of the school start disappearing—kidnapped and presumed dead.

== Characters ==
- Joel Saxon, the son of a cleaning lady and a chalk-maker, whose father was killed. He wants to become a Rithmatist, he possesses Rithmatic ability, but has not been able to become a Rithmatist through inception.
- Melody Muns, a red-headed Rithmatist, who is a friend of Joel's, and claims that her life is a tragedy. Despite the odds, all members of the Muns Family are Rithmatists.
- Professor Fitch, a teacher at Armedius Academy who investigates the kidnappings of several students. He has an untidy study, but is very smart. He does not like confrontation.
- Principal Thomas York, the principal of Armedius Academy. He was a good friend of Joel's father before he died.
- Professor Andrew Nalizar, a professor who fought at Nebrask and is now teaching at Armedius. He took over Professor Fitch's classes after defeating him in a rithmatic duel.
- Inspector Harding, a federal inspector brought in to investigate the disappearances at the school.
- Exton Pratt, an administrator at Armedius Academy.
- Florence, an administrator at Armedius Academy.
- Lilly Whiting, a missing, presumed dead student who was the first attacked. She attended Armedius Academy, and previously trained with Fitch.
- Herman Libel, a missing, presumed dead student who was the second attacked. He attended Armedius Academy, and previously trained with Fitch.
- Charles Calloway, a missing, presumed dead student who was the third attacked. He attended Armedius Academy, and was considered to be one of the best in his class.
- William Muns, the brother of Melody Muns, who went missing during his time at Nebrask. Nalizar attempted to save him, leading a search team that included Inspector Harding.
- Mrs. Saxon, Joel's mother who works hard as a janitor to pay off the debt of her husband Trent Saxon (amazing chalkmaker) who died 8 years before.
- Chalkling, creature created by Rithmatists who can be made to kill but usually aren't because it is hard to.

== Sequel ==
According to Sanderson, at least one other novel will be published in the Rithmatist series. The sequel is tentatively titled The Aztlanian. In 2018, Brandon wrote that he does not plan to work on it until he finished the Alcatraz series with the sixth book in that, which was published in 2022. One of the reasons Brandon hasn't worked on the sequel, yet, is that it will deal with Native American culture and he wants to be sure to treat the subject matter with due respect.

== Reception ==
Patrick Ness wrote in The New York Times that "the world of the novel is nicely fleshed out", but "there is almost no action until the climax". The book was named one of the "Notable Children's Books of 2013" by the New York Times.

== Awards and nominations ==
- BFYA Awards—Best Fiction for YA (nominated) for The Rithmatist (2013)
- Audie Award—Fantasy Category (nominated) for The Rithmatist

=== Honorable mentions ===
- New York Times Book Review: Notable Children's Books of the Year (2013) for The Rithmatist
- Kirkus Reviews Best Books of the Year (2013) for The Rithmatist
