= Arcanum Unbounded: The Cosmere Collection =

Short story collection by Brandon Sanderson

- Cover of the hardcover
- Author: Brandon Sanderson
- Illustrator: Ben McSweeney; Isaac Stewart
- Cover artist: David Palumbo
- Language: English
- Series: Cosmere
- Genre: Epic fantasy
- Published: November 22, 2016
- Publisher: Tor Books
- Publication place: United States
- Media type: Print (hardcover and mass-market paperback), audiobook, e-book
- Pages: 672 (hardcover)
- ISBN: 978-0-7653-9116-2
- OCLC: 935985784
- Dewey Decimal: 813/.6
- LC Class: PS3619.A533 A6 2016

Arcanum Unbounded: The Cosmere Collection is a collection of epic fantasy short stories and novellas written by American author Brandon Sanderson set in his Cosmere universe. It was published on November 22, 2016, by Tor Books.

== Contents ==
The nine stories in the collection are set in the worlds of Roshar, Scadrial, Sel, Threnody, First of the Sun, and Taldain, which are all a part of Sanderson's Cosmere universe. The collection also includes essays and illustrations for the various planetary systems in which the stories are set. All have been released individually or as part of multi-author anthologies in the past.

The collection includes the following works:

1. The Emperor's Soul, a novella originally published in 2012
2. The Hope of Elantris, originally published as an e-book in 2007
3. The Eleventh Metal, originally released in 2011 as part of the Mistborn Adventure Game
4. Allomancer Jak and the Pits of Eltania, Episodes 28 through 30, originally released on August 3, 2014, as part of the Alloy of Law extension to the Mistborn Adventure Game
5. Mistborn: Secret History, a short novel originally published in 2016 as an e-book
6. White Sand, an excerpt of the graphic novel originally published in 2016 and a previously unpublished opening section of the original prose version of the story.
7. Shadows for Silence in the Forests of Hell, a novella originally published in 2013 in the Dangerous Women anthology
8. Sixth of the Dusk, a novellette originally published in 2014 in the Shadows Beneath anthology
9. Edgedancer, a Stormlight Archive novella

== Reception ==
Publishers Weekly called the collection required reading for fans of Sanderson's work and noted that it also offers a lot to readers who are undaunted by learning a lot. Kirkus Reviews wrote that many of the stories were "good...with all the quick wit, richly detailed settings, and memorable characters fans have come to expect from this prolific writer." However, they also stated that some of the stories lacked solid character building and felt "more like deleted scenes".
