= The Sunlit Man =

2023 fantasy novel by Brandon Sanderson

- Cover art for the Tor Books edition of "The Sunlit Man"
- Author: Brandon Sanderson
- Language: English
- Series: Cosmere
- Genre: Fantasy
- Set in: Canticle (planet)
- Published: October 1, 2023
- Publisher: Dragonsteel Entertainment
- Publication place: United States
- Pages: 400 (Hardcover)
- ISBN: 978-1250899712

The Sunlit Man is a 2023 fantasy novel by Brandon Sanderson, set in his Cosmere universe. The novel was the fourth of Sanderson's "secret projects", a result of his record-breaking 2022 Kickstarter campaign.

== Plot ==
A man called Nomad (Note: Nomad's true name is Sigzil; he is a character from The Stormlight Archive) is being pursued by the Night Brigade. Nomad and his spren companion Auxiliary (Note: Spren are a type of spirit from The Stormlight Archive novels. In this series, Auxiliary was known as 12124.) arrive on the planet Canticle. Canticle is a very small, inhospitable planet. The heat of the sun kills anyone who is exposed to daylight; the planet's inhabitants live on floating cities, always fleeing from the dawn.

Nomad is immediately captured by the Cinder King, a local warlord. The Cinder King controls his subjects with objects called cinderhearts, which burn away their personalities and turn them into creatures called Charred. Nomad escapes the Cinder King with a woman named Rebeke and her sister Elegy, who has been turned into a Charred.

Nomad reaches the floating city of Beacon. (Note: The ancestors of the Beaconites were from Threnody. This is the setting for Shadows for Silence in the Forests of Hell.) He befriends the citizens there as they flee from the Cinder King. On Canticle, deceased humans who are left to burn in the sunlight leave behind a sunheart. These sunhearts serve as power sources for the Beaconites’ cities. The Beaconites believe in a mythical refuge that will be safe from the sunlight. Nomad promises to bring them there, but in reality this shelter is a small research station from Scadrial, (Note: Scadrial is the setting of Sanderson's Mistborn novels.) which cannot support the population of Beacon.

The Scadrians offer to hire Nomad as a mercenary. He decides to stay with the Beaconites, who rename him Zellion. Eventually, he teaches Elegy to regain part of her humanity. Zellion and Rebeke discover a way to power their cities more efficiently, preventing the need for more sacrifices to create sunhearts. Zellion kills the Cinder King and leaves Canticle behind.

== Publication ==
Over the course of the COVID-19 pandemic, Sanderson wrote four secret novels. In 2022, he announced a campaign on Kickstarter to fund the self-publishing of these novels. This campaign became the most successful Kickstarter campaign of all time. The Sunlit Man became the fourth novel released as a part of this campaign. The four novels were initially distributed as special hardcover editions to Kickstarter backers. Later, the novels were acquired and hardcover editions were published by Tor Books. The Tor Books editions were released three months after each special edition was released.

== Reception ==
Lyndsey Luther of Reactor compared the novel to an entry in the Marvel Cinematic Universe. Luther believes that the book would likely not be a good starting point for a reader new to the Cosmere universe, stating "If you like to have every question answered, every loose end tied up, every character nuance explained… this will not be the book for you. If you’re okay with just going along for the ride and don’t think too much about the little details, you’ll have a much better time, but you’d likely have an even better time if you’ve read some of the other books in Sanderson’s “extended universe” before jumping in here." Luther enjoyed the novel, comparing Nomad to the protagonist from Mad Max: Fury Road if one were to "make [Max] a visitor from another planet who doesn’t speak the language, give him an actual personality, [and] make him likable from the get-go".

Charles Papadopoulos of Screen Rant wrote that "as a standalone story, Yumi and the Nightmare Painter is perhaps the best work to come from Sanderson's Secret Projects. However, The Sunlit Man ... could be the most exciting experience specifically for Cosmere fans." Papadopoulos praised the way in which Sanderson adds science fiction elements to the fantasy universe of the Cosmere, as well as the connections with Sanderson's other novel The Lost Metal.
