= Tress of the Emerald Sea =

2023 novel by Brandon Sanderson

- Tor Books edition cover
- Author: Brandon Sanderson
- Cover artist: Howard Lyon (Dragonsteel); Carlos Guimerà (Tor)
- Language: English
- Series: Cosmere
- Genre: High fantasy
- Published: January 1, 2023 (Dragonsteel; available to Kickstarters); January 10, 2023 (Dragonsteel; available to all); April 4, 2023 (Tor)
- Publisher: Dragonsteel Entertainment; Tor Books
- Publication place: United States
- Media type: Print (hardcover and paperback), audiobook, e-book
- Pages: 384 pp
- ISBN: 978-1-25-089965-1

Tress of the Emerald Sea is an epic fantasy novel written by American author Brandon Sanderson. It is part of the Cosmere fictional universe and the first book of Sanderson's "Secret Projects" Kickstarter campaign. It was exclusively released on January 1, 2023, by Dragonsteel Entertainment to Kickstarter backers, released online on January 10, 2023, and officially published on April 4, 2023, by Tor Books. In 2025 Sanderson established that the book is part of Hoid's Travails, a series narrated by the character Hoid.

== Plot ==
The story is set on the planet Lumar, which has twelve moons. Each moon is home to a specific variety of aethers, and they rain down spores onto the planet, creating twelve seas of spores, each a different color. The spores act like fluid through the process of fluidization, allowing ships to sail on them. However, the spores grow explosively when they come in contact with water, making sailing extremely hazardous.

Tress lives on the Rock, an isolated island in the Emerald Sea. She spends her days collecting cups from passing sailors, forming an impressive collection. One day, Tress visits her friend Charlie, the duke's son, but their bonding is cut short by the Duke's disapproval.

The next morning, the duke announces his family will be leaving the Rock to arrange a royal marriage for Charlie. Before departing, Charlie promises Tress he will return unmarried and bring her a special cup for each princess he avoids marrying. A year passes, and the duke's family returns—but Charlie is missing. Tress learns that after the duke realized Charlie was trying to avoid marriage, the king sent Charlie to the treacherous Midnight Sea, where has was captured by the Sorceress. Determined to save Charlie, Tress sets out on a perilous journey. She boards the smuggler ship Oot's Dream, where she befriended a talking rat named Huck. When the ship is ambushed by pirates, Tress and Huck escape and join the crew of the pirate ship, the Crow's Song.

Tress quickly befriends most of the crew, including quartermaster Fort, carpenter Ann, helmswoman Salay, surgeon Ulaam, and cabin boy Hoid, who has a curse given by the Sorceress. Tress sabotages the Crow's Song's attacks to avoid casualties, while also secretly planning a mutiny with the crew. She learns that the captain, Crow, is a "spore eater" with a condition that protects her from physical harm but will soon kill her. Tress also learns that Crow seeks a cure for her illness from the dragon Xisis, who lives in the Crimson Sea and offers a boon in trade for a servant who is not afraid of spores. Tress realizes that Crow wants to trade Tress. As the ship enters the Crimson Sea, Tress learns that the danger of this sea is that rain falls unpredictably.

To defend herself, Tress invents a flare gun that can be used to capture Crow. Tress exploits a loophole in Hoid's curse to deduce the location of the Sorceress, and Huck then informs Tress about the Sorceress's lair and the defenses she must overcome. Tress figures out how to use spores to create a giant protective tree for the ship when rain comes. Tress, Fort, Ann, and Salay plan to remove Crow, but she discovers their plot and singlehandedly defeats them and takes Tress to Xisis's lair to trade her for healing. However, Tress outsmarts Crow, convincing the dragon to take Crow as the trade instead. With Crow removed, the crew elects Tress as their captain, supporting her mission to the Midnight Sea.

Tress introduces Huck as her valet to the crew and comes up with a plan to deal with the Sorceress's midnight monsters. However, the paranoid Huck secretly sabotages the ship's food supplies, causing Tress to distrust and imprison him. Tress tries to overcome the midnight monsters, but they are about to kill her when Huck admits he serves the Sorceress, so the monsters take her captive. At the Sorceress's tower, Tress realizes the Sorceress has cursed Charlie, now revealed as Huck (Charlie meant to say "Chuck," but the curse prevented him from doing so and changed his alias to "Huck"). As Tress and Charlie embrace, the Crow's Song crew attacks the island. Fort controls the midnight monsters by bribing them with water; Ann and Laggart, the cannonmaster, defeat the Sorceress's army of metal men by using Tress's flare design; and Hoid, who breaks his curse by reaching the Sorceress, protects Tress and defeats the Sorceress, forcing the Sorceress to leave the planet. It is revealed that Hoid's curse was a bet with the Sorceress, and by winning, Hoid gained the powers of the Sorceress.

Five months later, Tress, Charlie (who has his curse broken by Hoid), and the crew stop by the Rock for a short time before sailing off towards other adventures.

== Characters ==
- Tress: The story's main protagonist and heroine. Her actual name is Glorf, but everyone calls her Tress, after her unruly hair. She is fond of cups and keeps a collection.
- Captain Crow: The ruthless ship captain of the Crow's Song. She has a symbiotic relationship with verdant aether (a condition colloquially known as being a “spore eater”) in which the aether protects her from harm in exchange for increasing amounts of water. This condition is fatal, but she has already lived past her expiration date, making her nihilistic and overconfident, and therefore dangerous.
- The Sorceress/Riina: the main antagonist of the story. She came to Lumar because there was nothing at the planet that could threaten her. She then cursed anyone she met, making hers a very feared name.
- Ann: The ship's carpenter. She loves guns, but has horrendous aim, to the point of comedy.
- Salay: The ship's helmswoman. Her goal is to find her father, who was imprisoned for his debts.
- Fort: The ship's deaf quartermaster who uses a Nalthian board for translation. He loves bartering and trading. He was the first member of the crew to be nice to Tress.
- Laggart: The ship's cannonmaster. He is Captain Crow's most loyal crewmember but later comes to help the crew.
- Charlie: The duke's son and Tress's love interest. He is most fond of stories and adventures. His curse from Riina turns him into a rat. As a rat, he goes by the name "Huck", as his curse prevents him from revealing his identity.
- Ulaam: A kandra from Scadrial who came to Lumar to find Hoid. After seeing Hoid's state, Ulaam chose to remain with Hoid to keep an eye on him. He now spends his days as the ship's surgeon.
- Hoid: A Worldhopper and storyteller who is the narrator of this story. For most of the story, he is cursed by the Sorceress, though he breaks the curse at the end to gain her powers. Hoid recurs in every novel set within the overarching universe of the Cosmere.

== Publication ==
In spring 2022, Brandon Sanderson announced a Kickstarter campaign of "Secret Projects" to publish four secret and brand-new novels written during the COVID-19 pandemic. The campaign reached its goal within a day, and accumulated a total of $41.7 million. Tress of the Emerald Sea is the first of the Secret Projects and is part of Sanderson's fictional Cosmere universe. The novel is inspired by William Goldman’s 1973 novel The Princess Bride and is narrated by Hoid, a recurring character who had appeared in multiple Cosmere series novels and whom Sanderson always wanted to have a book centered on.

Kickstarter campaign backers received premium editions of the novel published by Dragonsteel Entertainment on January 1, 2023, and a standard hardback edition published by Tor Books was officially released on April 4, 2023.

== Reception ==
Kirkus Reviews called the novel "a fantasy adventure with a sometimes-biting wit", and praising it for the engrossing worldbuilding, appealing characters and sense of humor.

Lyndsey Luther of Tor.com called the novel "fascinating and completely unlike anything I’ve seen in any other fantasy novel". She described the novel as "a fairy-tale Cosmere adventure filled with fun characters" and said "Sanderson’s gift for creating unique settings really shines".

David Wiley of Open Letters Review praised the novel for its "punchy pacing, witty humor, vibrant characters, and fascinating magic systems", yet he criticized the narrative and too many Cosmere-related subtleties added to the plot.
