= Snapshot (novella) =

2017 novella by Brandon Sanderson

- First edition
- Author: Brandon Sanderson
- Cover artist: Vincent Chong
- Language: English
- Genre: Science fiction
- Publisher: Vault Books (US)
- Publication date: 2017
- Publication place: United States
- Media type: Print

Snapshot is a novella by American author Brandon Sanderson published in 2017.

== Background ==
Sanderson wrote this novella during a trip in the United Arab Emirates. He said "Snapshot is one of those stories that, once I had the idea, wouldn’t leave me alone. I wrote it furiously, having only about a week’s time to finish it, and I’m very pleased with the product: a kind of cyberpunk–detective thriller mashup."

== Plot introduction ==
The Snapshot Project has been inherited by an independent city-state called New Clipperton, which enables it to recreate a day up to 10 days in the past and used to investigate the crimes on that date. Detectives Anthony Davis and his partner Chaz are the only real people in the city of 20 million. They are sent into snapshots whose badges enable them to uncover crimes based on the real city. On 1 May they uncover hidden evidence of a grisly mass murder but the authorities have ordered them to ignore it...

== Audiobook ==
An audiobook version of the book was released on February 17, 2017, by Audible.com, read by narrator William DeMerritt.

== Reception ==
- Sarah Deeming in The British Fantasy Society explains that "This is a multi-layered story examining perception and reality. Throughout, Sanderson asks us to consider the difference between reality and perception. What is real and what is not. As they go through their day, Davis and his partner, Chaz, disagree on how to treat the people within the snapshot, dupes as they’re referred to...This novella has one of the best first lines for a story I’ve read in a long time... Instantly, I wanted to know more and was immediately fascinated."
- In Medium.com in The Warbler, Elan Samuel writes "What’s especially cool about Sanderson’s execution of this story is that there’s the twist you expect, which occupies the bulk of your subconscious processing while you read, but makes the reveal of the twist you don’t expect a much more powerful experience. Snapshot is short, focused, and stably-paced. The characters are great, and the action is sporadic, playing a backseat to the general thrill of the story. I can’t recommend it enough"

== Film rights ==
MGM have announced the film rights of the novella. In addition, Broken Road Productions and Film 360 are producing the movie. In December 2024, Sanderson revealed that the screenplay for the adaptation had been written by screenwriter Dean Georgaris, with Sanderson commending the screenplay for having created a story better than his short story. In December 2025, Sanderson revealed that the deal had fallen through, and that the rights had been returned to him.
