= Alcatraz Versus the Knights of Crystallia =

2009 novel by Brandon Sanderson

- Author: Brandon Sanderson
- Cover artist: Scott Brundage
- Language: English
- Series: Alcatraz Versus
- Genre: Fantasy novel
- Publication date: July 5, 2009 (paperback edition)
- Publication place: United States
- Pages: 320
- ISBN: 978-0-7653-7898-9
- Preceded by: Alcatraz Versus the Scrivener's Bones
- Followed by: Alcatraz Versus the Shattered Lens

Alcatraz Versus the Knights of Crystallia is a juvenile fiction novel written by American author Brandon Sanderson, originally published in October 2009 by Scholastic Press. It is the third book in the Alcatraz Series following Alcatraz Versus the Evil Librarians in 2007 and Alcatraz Versus the Scrivener's Bones in 2008.

== Plot summary ==
Alcatraz Versus the Knights of Crystallia continues the adventures Alcatraz Smedry and his unusual family and friends who are members of the Free Kingdoms and fighting to protect the world from the cult of Evil Librarians. Alcatraz has finally made it to Nalhalla, location of the Smedry family's home and Crystallia, the kingdom of the Crystin Knights. Alcatraz and his group must work fast to prevent the librarian takeover of the kingdom of Mokia (another of the free kingdoms) and their infiltration of spies into the ranks of the Knights of Crystallia.

=== Smedry's Talents ===
Alcatraz Smedry again has the talent to break things, which has caused him trouble in the past at his many foster homes, but he is now learning to control it better. His father, Attica Smedry, has the ability to lose things, and by marriage, Alcatraz's librarian mother has that talent as well. Kazan (Kaz) Smedry, Attica's brother and Alcatraz's uncle, has the ability to get lost in many remarkable ways. Leavenworth Smedry, Alcatraz's grandfather, has the ability to arrive late to things; regular events such as Alcatraz receiving the Sands of Rashid and things like pain and bullets. Folsom Smedry has the talent of being an extremely bad dancer, which is later passed onto Himalaya. It comes in handy during battle and happens whenever they hear music.

== Reception ==
The School Library Journal praised the book's "metafictional humor", a staple of the series, and found the main character's "changing perceptions of his parent [...] particularly interesting." They also commented on the plot, which might be complicated to follow at times, as well as the plots that are left open for a possible sequel, but ended on a high note, saying that "[b]eneath the wild humor, there are surprisingly subtle messages about responsibility and courage."
