= White Sand (graphic novel) =

Fantasy graphic novel series part of Brandon Sanderson's Cosmere

- Cover of White Sand Volume I

Publication information
- Publisher: Dynamite Entertainment
- Genre: Fantasy
- Publication date: June 2016 – September 2019
- No. of issues: 3

Creative team
- Created by: Brandon Sanderson; Rik Hoskin
- Written by: Brandon Sanderson; Rik Hoskin
- Artist(s): Julius Gopez; Cassandra James; Fritz Casas
- Letterer: Marshall Dillon
- Colorist: Sophie Campbell
- Editor: Rich Young

White Sand is a fantasy graphic novel series written by American author Brandon Sanderson and Rik Hoskin, with artwork by Julius Gopez initially, and later by Fritz Casas. The first part of the trilogy, White Sand Volume I, was published on June 28, 2016. The second part was published on February 20, 2018. The third and final part was published on September 18, 2019.

== Plot ==
The graphic novels are part of Sanderson's "Cosmere" arc of inter-connected novels.

The series is set on a desert world, Taldain, where a young Daysider man named Kenton trains to become a Sand Master, harnessing arcane magic to manipulate the planet's sand. Following a surprise attack where many of his brethren are killed, Kenton must take responsibility to keep the order of Sand Masters alive and discover who betrayed them.

In volume 2, Kenton finds himself trying to negotiate politics with the Dayside's rulers while having assassins trying to kill him. He forms a pact with Khriss, who is from the night side of the planet and she is drawn to sand mastery.

In volume 3, Kenton is overwhelmed trying to keep the Sand Masters together. Kenton discovers the truth behind the ambush that killed his father and most of the Sand Masters.

== Development history ==
White Sand originated in a series of unpublished manuscripts produced by Sanderson in the years before his debut publication Elantris in 2005. Sanderson wrote White Sand Prime over two years and completed it in 1998, then his first ever novel. This was followed by a sequel manuscript Lord Mastrell in 1999, and a complete rewrite of the text simply as White Sand in 2001. Sanderson described the rewritten version as "much better" in 2008. While the 1998 and 1999 manuscripts have not been fully released, an excerpt was published in the 2016 collection Arcanum Unbounded, and the 2001 revision is available to subscribers of his newsletter.

The first volume in the series was published in June 2016 and reached number two on the graphic novel New York Times Best Seller List. In the 2018 Dragon Awards, volume one won for best graphic novel.

#	Title	Pages	Release date	Hardback ISBN
1	White Sand I	160	28 June 2016	ISBN 978-1606908853
2	White Sand II	160	20 February 2018	ISBN 978-1524103422
3	White Sand III	160	18 September 2019	ISBN 978-1524110062

== Adaptations ==
A three-part audio adaptation of the graphic novel trilogy was released by GraphicAudio on 23 August 2019. AudioFile gave this audio series a mixed review, noting that the production "dazzles" but criticising the sound design.
