= Legion (novella series) =

Series of novellas by Brandon Sanderson

Legion, or the Stephen Leeds series, is a series of science fiction novellas created by American author Brandon Sanderson. Sanderson authored the first three stories (all published through Subterranean Press): Legion, first published on August 31, 2012, Legion: Skin Deep in November 2014, and Legion: Lies of the Beholder in September 2018. Death and Faxes, co-authored by Max Epstein, David Pace, and Michael Harkins, was released in June 2022. The books have received favorable reviews.

== Background ==
Sanderson wrote the first story on the flight home from France in the summer of 2011. It "came from an idea I'd been kicking around in my head for a few months, and the time seemed right to explore it on paper. When finished, I sent it out to my agent - and we had a Hollywood option by the end of the year.

== Plot ==
=== Legion ===
Legion (2012) tells the story of Stephen Leeds, better known as 'Legion', a man whose unique mental condition allows him to generate a multitude of personae. He is a brilliant problem solver, rich and quite good at what he does, helped by his hallucinations. However, he would rather be left alone, and that means no researchers or psychologists who want to get to the bottom of his abilities.

But then Legion receives a letter with a mysterious, impossible picture, and he can't resist traveling the world to search for answers. He must track down a missing inventor who disappeared with a camera that can take pictures of the past. Helped by Monica, who is also searching for the inventor, he travels to Jerusalem to solve the problem.

=== Legion: Skin Deep ===
Stephen is called on to help a friend after the mysterious disappearance of a body. His investigation is hampered by the interference of a trained assassin and the dead man's younger brother. Stephen and his invisible entourage face danger at every turn whilst looking into the body theft and the man's secretive work on human cells.

=== Legion: Lies of the Beholder ===
Two unrelated events start it off: the disappearance of one of Stephen's many "aspects", Armando, and an unexpected cry for help from Sandra, the woman who helped him learn to live with his condition many years before. The combination of the two leads to a sinister high-tech firm specializing in advanced methods of human incarceration.

=== Death and Faxes ===
Set sometime between the end of Legion and Lies of the Beholder, Stephen Leeds works with the IRS to track down a hacker who uses technology to confuse, control, and kill people. Co-authored by Max Epstein, David Pace, and Michael Harkins.

== List of works in the series ==
Works are by Sanderson unless otherwise noted.

- Legion (September 2012, Subterranean Press, ISBN 978-1-59606-485-0)
- Legion: Skin Deep (November 2014, Subterranean Press, ISBN 978-1-59606-690-8)
- Legion: Lies of the Beholder in Legion: The Many Lives of Stephen Leeds (September 2018, Tor Books, ISBN 978-1-250-29779-2)
  - Published separately in December 2018 through Subterranean Press (ISBN 9781596068858)
- Death and Faxes (June 2022, Recorded Books, audio only)

== Reception ==
Legion has been well received by reviewers, one commenting: "This is the first time I wish a Brandon Sanderson story was longer than it ended up being. Maybe we'll get to read more about Stephen "Legion" Leeds in future stories or novels, if Sanderson finds the time between all his other projects. Leeds is definitely a character with enough depth to lead an entire novel, or even a series. Based on this short teaser novella and Sanderson's writing talent, Legion could be the starting point for a great contemporary fantasy/crime hybrid".

== Television rights ==
In 2013, Sanderson posted on his blog that Lionsgate has the rights for a Legion television show under option, and later said the TV rights were purchased by Lionsgate sometime in 2012. As of September 2020, the rights are held by Cineflix Media.
