= The Reckoners =

Novel series by Brandon Sanderson

Steelheart
- Cover of Steelheart, the first book in the series
- Steelheart (September 24, 2013); Firefight (January 6, 2015); Calamity (February 16, 2016); Mitosis (novella, December 3, 2013); Lux (2021)
- Author: Brandon Sanderson
- Country: United States
- Language: English
- Genre: Young adult, fantasy, superhero
- Publisher: Gollancz (UK), Random House Children's Books (US)
- Published: 2013–2016
- Media type: Print (hardcover and paperback), audiobook, e-book
- No. of books: 4

The Reckoners is a series of young adult (Note: They are published as adult outside of the US.) superhero novels written by American author Brandon Sanderson. The series consists of Steelheart (2013), Firefight (2015), Calamity (2016) and Lux (2021). The series depicts a post-apocalyptic world in which the appearance of an orbiting cosmic phenomenon known as Calamity has given random people superhuman powers in apparent defiance of known physical laws, turning them into "Epics". These Epics prey upon or enslave the rest of humanity, causing the collapse of traditional governments. One young man orphaned by a High Epic joins a group that is killing Epics.

== Background ==
Twelve years ago, an object dubbed Calamity appeared near Earth and burst in the sky, emitting a strange radiation which gave a small group of humans superpowers and near invincibility in apparent defiance of the known laws of physics. They all have different types of powers and weaknesses, with no apparent rhyme or reason. Dubbed Epics, these super-humans took to crime. Existing government proved absolutely incapable of controlling the Epics, the most powerful of which replaced government authority and enslaved the rest of humanity.

Ten years ago, an eight-year-old Chicago native boy named David Charleston was orphaned when the High Epic Steelheart murdered his father while confronting a rival Epic, Deathpoint, in a bank. The sole survivor of the bank carnage, David has now come of age in what is known as Newcago, ruled by Steelheart. David witnessed Steelheart's one weakness as his father inflicted a minor wound right under Steelheart's eye, while trying to kill Deathpoint, and David has grown up devoting his life to learning all he can about the Epics to find their weaknesses, with the goal of avenging his father. He tracks "the Reckoners", an elite group led by "Professor" Jonathan Phaedrus with the common goal of killing as many Epics as possible. They decide to admit him into their group when they discover he has witnessed Steelheart's weakness, and his collected research.

Steelheart has turned most all of Newcago into steel with his power and one of his right-hand men, Nightwielder, keeps it in eternal darkness by hiding the Sun. Humans live mostly underground and work at menial factory jobs. However, Steelheart has proven himself a more effective Epic ruler, by providing Newcago with infrastructure, food, water, and electricity, in contrast with most other cities in what are now known as the "Fractured States".

== Synopsis per Book ==
=== Steelheart ===
Steelheart
- Author: Brandon Sanderson
- Series: The Reckoners
- Publication date: 24 September 2013
- Pages: 386
- ISBN: 978-0385743563

The United States, and other parts of the world, were changed forever when a glowing red light in the sky known as Calamity gave normal people superhuman powers and abilities. These people came to be known to humanity as Epics. The story is told through the perspective of David, an orphaned teenager living in Newcago (formerly known as Chicago). Newcago is ruled by the extremely powerful Epic named Steelheart, who has created a society run by other powerful Epics, with normal people living with normal jobs. Steelheart is apparently invulnerable, is able to fly, can hurl blasts of energy, and can turn inanimate matter to steel; he has turned all of Chicago to steel for kilometers around and into the ground. Newcago is also shrouded in darkness by Steelheart's lieutenant, Nightwielder. Compared to other places in what was the United States, war torn, lawless and ravaged by warring Epics, Newcago is well run, with normal people generally having access to food, water, electricity, jobs, etc.

David's father was murdered by Steelheart around the time of the collapse. When David was eight, he and his father were at a bank which was attacked by an Epic named Deathpoint who had the power to vaporize people by pointing at them. Half the bank was killed when Steelheart came in and Deathpoint started to argue with him. During this time, David's father grabbed one of the dead guards' guns and prepared himself to kill Deathpoint, believing that Steelheart was a hero. When his father shot Deathpoint, the bullet grazed Steelheart's cheek and caused him to bleed. Enraged, Steelheart killed David's father and then proceeded to destroy the bank. David crawled into one of the vaults, which ultimately saved him from falling debris and isolated him from Steelheart's energy blasts. Later, David was recovered by rescue workers, who told him to play dead, but he ended up running away scared when the coast was clear. This also saved him because Steelheart came back with another Epic named Faultline and sank the entire building into the ground, killing all of the other survivors and the rescue workers. David later guessed that Steelheart did this because everyone in the bank had watched him bleed and had learned that his invincibility had a weakness. David dedicates his life to learning about the Epics' power, Steelheart's weakness, and about a group of normal humans dedicated to killing Epics, called the Reckoners, so that he can get revenge on Steelheart.

Near the start of the book, David makes contact with the Reckoners when he interferes with one of their missions. Among this group are the leader and founder of the Reckoners, Jonathan Phaedrus, who is called Prof throughout the book, Tia, Abraham, Cody, and the newest recruit, Megan. They first take David along with them because they fear that he could be an Epic who was sent to spy on them. The Reckoners plan to leave him behind after learning that he was a normal person who only studied them long enough to learn their habits. David convinces them to bring him along and work with him when he tells them that he has seen Steelheart bleed. After going on a mission to retrieve his notes, David convinces the Reckoners to try to kill Steelheart.

In addition to hunting Epics, the Reckoners are in possession of advanced technology, which they say has scientifically been derived from Epic powers, most prominently the power to tunnel through inanimate matter, namely steel, using a glove-like item called "Tensors". They used these Tensors to tunnel escape routes during missions, create tunnels used as traps, and to create hiding places. They also have a machine called the Harmsway, which is used to quickly heal wounds, and they have clothing that projects a small and fairly effective protective force field.

The Reckoners create a plan to lure out Steelheart; the plan is to announce that there is a powerful new Epic named Limelight, who challenges Steelheart to a duel for Newcago. To make Steelheart take the challenge seriously, they stage two attacks which they accredit to Limelight. First, they blow up the power plant that supplies Newcago with a portion of its electricity. Secondly, they tried to attack one of the powerful Epics in Steelheart's employ known as Conflux; he is known as a "gifter", or "transference Epic" which gives him the ability to gift his powers to non-Epics and in his case, anything that runs on electricity. The attack doesn't go according to plan because they were somehow found out. During the escape, Megan is killed, but they do succeed in kidnapping Conflux. It is revealed that Conflux was actually a captive of Steelheart, kept prisoner and used like a battery to power the city and the weapons of Steelheart's forces. With the capture of Conflux, Steelheart accepts the Reckoners', or as he thinks, Limelight's, challenge.

They set the final battle to happen at the all-steel ruins of Soldier Field. Before signaling Steelheart, they rig the stadium with multiple exits and various traps. They plan to test each of their theories about Steelheart's true weakness, including that some of the contents of the vault can weaken him, that he can only be hurt by someone who believes in the possibility of good Epics, that he can only be hurt by crossfire, and that he can only be hurt by the gun that David's father used. When they meet Steelheart, they try out all but one theory of breaking his invincibility, but none work. Prof stalls Steelheart by using the Tensors to fight him. The powerful Epics named Nightwielder and Firefight go after David, preventing him from using his father's gun on Steelheart. David is able to kill Nightwielder, but Firefight turns out to be Megan, who is revealed as an illusionist Epic with reincarnation abilities who had infiltrated the Reckoners. Because of David's love for Megan, and because Megan was extremely confused and less evil from not using her powers regularly, she lets David go. David joins Prof in the fight against Steelheart, but Prof is killed. David soon finds out that their last theory about David's father's gun does not work. Steelheart takes David's gun, and is intent on shooting him with it, but shortly before allowing Steelheart to take the gun, David figured out that Steelheart's weakness is that he can only be killed by someone who does not fear him, and has rigged the gun to trigger an explosive. When the explosives go off, Steelheart is killed, due to the fact that it was he who pulled the trigger and he doesn't fear himself, he ended up unknowingly killing himself.

When the dust settles, it is revealed that Prof is an Epic who had avoided turning evil by gifting his powers in the form of technology. One of these powers is the ability to heal rapidly, and he used this power on himself just in time to revive himself and prevent the explosive blast from killing David by using a shielding power. David then tells Prof about how Megan is actually Firefight, which shocks him. David then runs off to find her and talk to her. When he encounters her, he finds that the reincarnation process messed with her memory and that she does not remember everything she has been through with David, only that she is supposed to be one of the bad guys. David tries to convince her to come with him and the rest of the Reckoners, but she refuses and David is forced to leave her.

At the end of the novel, David reflects on what he has done. He and the other Reckoners realize that they will have to continue to fight for the safety of Newcago because other Epics will come, looking to fill in Steelheart's place. He then thinks about how he did not kill Steelheart only because he wanted revenge for his father or redemption for running away when he was little, but because he was fighting for his father's dreams of good Epics.

=== Mitosis (short story) ===
Mitosis
- Author: Brandon Sanderson
- Series: The Reckoners
- Publication date: December 3, 2013
- ISBN: 9780449818435

This short story takes place between the Steelheart and Firefight books. In it, the Epic Mitosis does not believe that David was the one to bring down Steelheart. Mitosis's ability is to split into multiple clones of himself each clone having their own consciousness. Mitosis weakness is his own music from when he was in a band before he was an Epic. He is defeated by the citizens of Newcago, who were previously too afraid to confront any Epics, coming together to collectively sing one of his songs.

=== Firefight ===
Firefight
- Author: Brandon Sanderson
- Series: The Reckoners
- Publication date: 6 January 2015
- Pages: 419
- ISBN: 978-0385743587

Book 2, Firefight, was published on 6 January 2015.

After the events of Steelheart and Mitosis, David Charleston, dubbed as the infamous 'Steelslayer' by many, is searching for something to fill the hole left now that his revenge had at long last been fulfilled. Firefight, otherwise known as Megan, has since left the Reckoners knowing her cover as Steelheart's spy was blown. With the attacks on his team from Mitosis and Sourcefield, Jon Phaedrus, or known as Prof throughout the book, has eyes set on the common connection between them and Regalia, the Epic who rules Babilar, formerly known as Manhattan, and who has sent multiple subordinate Epics to confront the Newcago Reckoners. Jon sets out to Babilar with David and Tia (leaving Abraham and Cody behind to defend the city of Newcago) to face Regalia, whom David suspects has a long-term connection with Jon and Tia, because they seem to know a lot about each other.

Upon arriving in Babilar, a ruined NYC flooded up to the top of the skyscrapers, which are used by the citizens as homes, connected by ladders, Prof, David, and Tia meet with Val, the tough-headed operations leader of the Babilar Reckoners, Exel, the extremely large and friendly giant of the team, and Mizzy, the spunky and clumsy point/repair and equipment manager. Together, they go out on boat to the city, where they discuss Regalia's powers of being able to control the water and water level, as well as being able to project herself upon the water's surface and see things near the water surface. The group finds it odd that she's turned the city into a less restricted community, turning it into more of a free haven. Suddenly, nearby rooftops blaze and explode, and it's revealed that Regalia has brought in Obliteration, an incredibly strong and cryptic Epic who has a flair for the theatrics and is famous for desolating Houston, San Diego, and Albuquerque, not wanting to rule, but simply to destroy. With the abilities to absorb and disperse amazing amounts of heat, teleport in the wake of danger, as well as enhanced strength, he runs rampant throughout the city, killing citizens seemingly joyously while the Reckoners try to exploit a weakness. While fighting him, David notices bandages on his chest, as if he were recently injured. The lopsided scuffle ends with David being thrown into the depths with a ball and chain, before Obliteration graciously thanks him for slaying Steelheart, saying it's simply an obstacle averted in his quest to destroy everything in his path.

David is drowning, when he feels someone miraculously save him and put him ashore. When the other Reckoners return to him, Jon is missing, and it's understood that Prof had to use his powers to stave off Obliteration, but it's also understood that the Epic was not defeated. While escaping to a submarine with the others, David catches a glimpse of Megan in wet clothes in a crowd, and soon realizes that she saved him. The Reckoners' submarine takes them to an underwater mansion, where they are hidden from Regalia's view. David, who is obviously uneasy about water, sees Prof return, and implores that perhaps Regalia is trying to resist the Epic powers, to which Tia agrees. However, Prof believes something bigger is happening, convinced the assassins were a call for help to kill her instead of having her powers take over and destroy the city, and takes David aside to warn him that Regalia is the primary target, and to not let his feelings for Megan get in the way of the mission.

Exel and Mizzy help David learn to use the spyril, a piece of Knighthawk machinery that allows the user to use it as a jet pack of water. After plenty of training on this, David and Mizzy are sent to a Babilar party to spy on Newton, a gang leader in the city and an Epic working for Regalia. However, Mizzy and David end up connecting, and it's revealed that Mizzy wants to kill 'Firefight' (Megan) for killing Sam, an old member of her team. David tries to spy on Newton, but suddenly realizes that Megan is following him and draws her out when they are alone. Megan, who is trying to resist her Epic temptations, tells him that she finds it easier to control herself around him, and the two have a laugh in the wake of a bad metaphor by David. Megan gives David a motivator, which is a small object that helps Knighthawk technology work, before leaving him, threatening him with a gun when he tries to kiss her. However, David notices that she has the safety on, and believes that it is love.

David continues to practice with the spyril, and improves his skills greatly, until suddenly Regalia's water projection appears. The two discuss the morals of Reckoners and Epics, and while David tries to figure out her location by triangulation, she states that he has only hurt society by killing Steelheart, and that he will be the end of his own people. She disappears, and David contemplates how the Epics' weaknesses may possibly be connected to events from their past, like Mitosis' weakness was his own rock music from the past. David and Exel delve into the lore of 'Dawnslight', a believed good Epic who watches over the city and grants it with glowing lights on the spray paint on the side of the walls of buildings, as well as filling the interiors of the city's skyscrapers with luscious, jungle-like greenery and fruit to feed the people. However, the conversation is cut short when it's discovered that Obliteration is sitting on top of a rooftop in Babilar, collecting up heat from the sun, most likely in an effort to vaporize the city.

David keeps in touch with Megan via text, and Prof (who is thinking of a plan to stop Obliteration from destroying the city) becomes suspicious that he's putting her in front of the mission to end Regalia's reign over Babilar, and even threatens to send him back to Newcago. Prof leaves David still unsure if his presence helps or hinders the Reckoner team. While going out with the others to scout Obliteration's spot, David goes into the interior of a building and notices odd fortune cookies hanging off of vines from the large vegetation, with notes inside asking for help, saying that "She has me captive". The group sets up around Obliteration to spy on him, when Newton is noticed nearby, as well as Knoxx, another Epic thug who can change into a pigeon (among other animals, it is later revealed). It's realized that the two are planning on blowing up buildings around Obliteration as to keep anyone who could threaten his absorption away. It's assumed that all of the innocents inside died, but Prof steps up and conjures a force field to protect them. The refugees are led safely out of the city, and David ponders why Regalia plans to destroy the city she has seemed to care for and help grow all along.

After finally being able to connect with Val and meeting with Prof, who is in isolation to keep his powers at bay (they nearly overtook him after greatly exerting them), David runs into Megan, who snuck into the Reckoner base via their submarine, the two talk, and it's revealed that Megan hasn't been using her powers, and her Epic powers have been at bay. David and Megan finally embrace and kiss. Megan reveals that she is not, in fact, an illusion-making Epic, but can pull semi-real objects and people from alternate universes, and her weakness was fire.

Val catches David in contact with Megan, and her bullets are deflected by Prof, who plans to take out Newton and Megan at once to draw out Regalia. David is imprisoned at the Reckoners base by Prof. To escape Prof's shield wall, David puts a bullet hole in the window and talks to Regalia, exposing the location of the base, and she brings him high enough to see Calamity, who is not a star but a male Epic. Calamity attempts to gift David with powers, but he refuses as he had already faced his aquaphobia and is brought back down to Earth. David is able to kill Newton with her weakness, compliments, as the black sheep in her family, she was afraid of being perfect, with Mizzy's help, who was on point to assassinate Newton, after convincing her that Regalia knew their plans and they would fail. He then rushes to Megan's aid at a burning building, where Prof gifts him with some of his shielding powers to save her. David is too late, but discovers that Megan had rigged the high-tech gun Tia gave him to shoot her future self should she die of fire, which was her weakness and would disable her reincarnation abilities, and had succeeded. He then finds Regalia through shooting at Obliteration and grabbing onto him as he automatically teleported away, and finds her actually dying of cancer in a hospital bed next to Dawnslight, a benevolent Epic in a coma he's been in since childhood, who grants the city its eccentric ways, light and food, partially from an image of a city he's had in his mind as a child. Obliteration teleports away when David reveals that what Epics dream of in nightmares are their weakness. As he watches a projection of where Prof is and Regalia tells him that all the energy Obliteration had been gathering and the part she cut out of the Epic in exchange for more power was for a bomb — one she knew Prof could contain with his powers. As she planned, Prof does so and loses control, killing Val and Exel. David kills Regalia in rage. Prof arrives and uses his power with the intent to kill David. Before he can, a revived Megan appears and rescues David with her reality-warping powers. They escape and Prof flies away from the city. Megan realizes she is in control of herself, and David discovers that an Epic confronting their fears is the secret to remaining in control. With this knowledge they begin to prepare for their next confrontation with Prof.

=== Calamity ===
Calamity
- Author: Brandon Sanderson
- Series: The Reckoners
- Publication date: 16 February 2016
- Pages: 421
- ISBN: 978-0575104662

Following the events of Firefight, Prof has succumbed to his powers and David now leads what remain of the Reckoners. Broke and in need of equipment, they break into the Knighthawk Foundry. While searching a lab, David gets shot, and Megan ends up using her powers to save him, nearly succumbing to them. Before they can escape they are addressed by Knighthawk, who turns out to be an old associate of Prof. David asks him for help to recover Prof. Knighthawk gives them two motivators (epic-derived technology that allow others to use their powers) and tells them that Prof is in Atlanta, but he refuses to get further involved. David presses him, revealing that his ultimate plan is to kill Calamity. Knighthawk explains how motivators work and gives David an incubator to preserve a sample of Prof's DNA, in hopes of making motivators from it.

The Reckoners travel to Atlanta, or what is now called Ildithia. Ildithia is a moving city of salt, currently located somewhere in Kansas. Buildings, plants, and even cars parked along the streets have been transformed to salt, and as the city moves, structures grow out of salt near the front while those near the back crumble away. Residents are constantly moving to new homes in order to keep up with it. Ildithia is known for its abundant produce, due to an epic named Stormwind whose presence provides rain and unnaturally fast crop growth near the city.

When they arrive at Ildithia, they find a power struggle between Prof (going by his epic name, Limelight) and the previous ruler, the epic Larcener. Larcener has the ability to steal powers from other epics, so he has a wide variety of powerful abilities, the full extent of which is not known. In spite of this, he is apparently lazy, satisfied with ruling his single city and allowing other epics to do as they will.

The Reckoners soon encounter Prof, who is in the process of hunting down Larcener to secure his control of the city. Megan's illusions, images drawn from other realities, allow them to avoid his detection. While Megan is using her abilities Firefight inexplicably appears and briefly talks to David.

They set up in Ildithia, using one of Knighthawks motivators to fashion a base out of salt that blends in with the city. Before long Larcener shows up on their doorstep. (He is a dowser, able to sense other epics). Against the better judgment of the other Reckoners, David agrees to an alliance with him.

David and Abraham track down Tia, still alive in the city. She promised Prof she would kill him if he ever turned and she is working on plans to do so. She reveals Prof's weakness to David: his own powers when gifted to others. Unfortunately, Prof has tracked Tia down too. She gives herself up in order to protect the others, though she urges David to beat Prof and save her.

The Reckoners adapt Tia's plans into a rescue attempt, infiltrating a party at Sharp Tower (where Prof has taken up residence) to get her out. Obliteration recognizes David at the party but doesn't give them away; he says that they are on the same side in wanting to destroy Prof. Obliteration also hints that Prof has a bomb fashioned from his powers. They rescue Tia, but Prof is alerted to them in the process. David and Tia clash over what to do next. Tia has learned that Prof is following through on a Regalia's master plan, and wants to go through with her original plan to steal his data, but David insists they have to escape.

Before they can get out, Prof confronts David and Megan. Megan brings an alternate universe version of Prof's daughter to confront him with powers that match his own. It partially works–Prof is wounded, and David manages to get a tissue sample–but it does not drive the darkness out of Prof.

With different realities bleeding into one another, David slips into an alternate world, one where there is no Calamity, where Steelheart and Firefight are good epics and apparently fighting alongside the Reckoners. Upon David returning to his world, Prof has his guards open fire. David is somehow unharmed by the bullets, but Tia is killed. Prof, agonized by her death, destroys the entire Sharp Tower, and Megan manifests a parachute to barely allow them to survive the fall.

Once safe in their hideout they learn that Knighthawk was able to pull Prof's data off of Tia's mobile. It outlines Prof's plan: make a motivator of Larcener's ability and use it to steal Calamity's powers, becoming the ultimate epic. Knighthawk agrees to use the tissue sample to make motivators of Prof's powers.

Despite their failures, David convinces the Reckoners to stay in Ildithia and try one more time to turn Prof. Privately he confesses to Megan how he survived the bullets during the Sharp Tower assault, and about the nightmares, he's been having. When Calamity offered him powers he turned them down, yet these seem like strong signs that he is an epic.

Prof attacks their hideout and they are forced to face him with minimal preparation. Megan, finally accepting her powers as part of her, fights like she never has before but is eventually neutralized by minions with flamethrowers, as fire is Megan's weakness. David fights Prof wearing the tensor suit, a collection of motivators that gives him all of Prof's powers, but it's still not enough to drive away Prof's darkness. Finally, when David is beaten, he realizes Prof's true weakness: the fear of failure. They remind him of all the ways he has failed–leading the Reckoners to destruction, killing Tia–and his powers are neutralized. Larcener steps in and takes Prof's powers for himself.

Before anyone can respond Obliteration appears and teleports David away, fulfilling a promise to give David a chance to destroy Calamity. David, armed with an Obliteration-powered bomb, is deposited at Calamity's red star (actually the International Space Station, which has been turned to glass). David discovers that Larcener is Calamity, a supernatural being that loathes humans and at the same time fears their world. It is his hatred and disgust that corrupt epics to evil and he believes that humans are destined to destroy themselves.

David detonates the bomb, to no effect, but before Calamity can kill him Prof and Megan appear. Prof has faced his fear–of his powers, of failure–in order to save David, and this is the key; he has reclaimed his powers in a way that Calamity can neither steal nor corrupt. But even together, they can't beat Calamity. Instead, David has Megan send him and Calamity to the other universe. There Calamity sees proof that epics–Steelheart, Firefight–can be good. Forced to accept that humans are not wholly evil, he fades away.

With Calamity gone, epics are no longer compelled to be evil (although they can still choose to do so, as Obliteration does). David learns that in the alternate universe the epic known as Steelheart is, in fact, his father, with whom he is joyfully reunited.

After returning to his universe, David and the others are still in the space station which has started to fall down since Calamity is not there to hold it in place. David recalls his father's words before he dies: "There will be heroes. Just wait." With this in mind, David seizes the power from within and turns into an epic. He holds the same powers as Steelheart and his father from the alternate universe, and by turning the ISS into steel, the team survives the landing.

Obliteration meets them and reveals that he has faced the darkness five years ago but he is still determined to continue on with his plan of killing everyone. He tells David he will give him one week to rest and that his next target is Toronto.

In a final scene, Megan sends David into the alternate universe. David and his father talk, noting to one another that David's powers mimic those of his father—the ability to fly, the power to transform matter into solid steel, and immunity to bullets. David jokes that he hasn't quite got the flying part down, and his father offers to teach him, to which David eagerly agrees.

=== Lux ===
Lux
- Author: Brandon Sanderson & Steven Bohls
- Series: The Reckoners
- Publication date: 22 July 2021

Lux: A Texas Reckoners Novel, a spin-off and the fourth book in the series, was released on July 22, 2021, in an audiobook-only format; e-book and print editions are set for later release.

== Reception ==
Steelheart debuted at #1 on the New York Times Young Adult Bestseller list for the week of October 13, 2013 and gained favorable reviews, one commenting, "Like many of his other novels, Brandon Sanderson created a whole new world so imaginative, deep and different; a world that completely immerses you in it effortlessly".

Firefight also debuted at #1 on the New York Times Young Adult Bestseller list.
