= The Emperor's Soul =

2012 fantasy novella by Brandon Sanderson

- Cover showing artwork by Alexander Nanitchkov.
- Author: Brandon Sanderson
- Audio read by: Angela Lin
- Cover artist: Alexander Nanitchkov
- Language: English
- Series: The Cosmere
- Genre: Fantasy
- Set in: Sel (same world as Elantris)
- Published: October 10, 2012
- Publisher: Tachyon Publications
- Publication place: United States
- Media type: Trade paperback
- Pages: 175
- Awards: Hugo Award for Best Novella (2013)
- ISBN: 978-1-61696-092-6
- OCLC: 793575540
- Website: The Emperor's Soul

The Emperor's Soul is a fantasy novella written by American author Brandon Sanderson. It was first published in October 2012 by Tachyon Publications. It won the 2013 Hugo Award for best novella. The novella is included in the 2016 Arcanum Unbounded: The Cosmere Collection.

In 2026, Sanderson teased an adaptation of The Emperor's Soul might happen after his Mistborn movie and the Stormlight Archive TV show, following his deal with Apple TV. The author confirmed that he wrote a "pretty good" script.

== Plot ==
Shai is a thief and practitioner of magical forgery who has been arrested and sentenced to death. The Emperor's corrupt advisors offer to free her if she agrees to forge a new soul for the Emperor, who has been left brain dead by an assassination attempt. She agrees, but plans to escape. She is given 100 days to forge the soul, given only official histories, the Emperor's diary, and Gaotona, the only non-corrupt advisor, a task even she deems impossible. As the two research the Emperor's past together, Gaotona learns more about forgery, a generally detested practice, and the two develop a grudging respect for each other. During this task, Shai realizes the Emperor had once been idealistic, but a life of leisure resulted in his recent indulgence, and resolves to create and tweak the soul as her masterpiece, setting him on a better path. Though many opportunities present themselves, Shai puts off escaping until the work is done, whereupon Gaotona helps her win her freedom against his colleagues' treachery. The Emperor, with the forged soul, resumes his rule.

== Setting ==
The Emperor's Soul is set in the Rose Empire, a nation on the shardworld of Sel. This is the same world in which Elantris was set, though few connections are made to that book within The Emperor's Soul. In the postscript, Sanderson explains that he was inspired to write this story after visiting the National Palace Museum in Taiwan and also by memories from the two years he spent in Korea as a missionary for The Church of Jesus Christ of Latter-day Saints.

== Audiobook ==
An audiobook version of the book was released on November 2, 2012 by Audible.com, read by narrator Angela Lin.

== Reception ==
The Emperor's Soul won the 2013 Hugo Award for Best Novella. Strange Horizons called it "thoughtful yet exciting" and "difficult to put down," and judged that it deserved its award because of the questions it raises about the nature of art.

The A.V. Club described Forgery as "one of (the) more intriguing (magical systems that Sanderson has created)", but noted that the magic is "far more developed than any of the characters"—while conceding that "the tale is never dull". Tor.com similarly described the work as "enjoyable" and "a worthy addition to Sanderson’s bibliography", and recommended it to "readers who enjoy getting into the intricacies of a magic system", but faulted it as "abbreviated and a bit unbalanced", positing that it would have worked better as a full-length novel.
