= Bastille vs. the Evil Librarians =

2022 juvenile fiction novel by Brandon Sanderson and Janci Patterson

- Author: Brandon Sanderson and Janci Patterson
- Cover artist: Justin Gerard
- Series: Alcatraz Versus
- Publisher: Tor Books
- Publication date: September 20, 2022
- Pages: 272
- ISBN: 978-1-2508-1106-6
- Preceded by: Alcatraz Versus the Dark Talent

Bastille vs. the Evil Librarians is a juvenile fiction novel written by Brandon Sanderson and Janci Patterson. Released on September 20, 2022 by Tor Books, it was illustrated by Hayley Lazo. It is the sixth and final book in the Alcatraz Versus series. Leading up to the book's release, Tor published new paperback versions of its five predecessors.

Before the sixth book was released, Sanderson said publicly that there were going to only be five books in the series but told editors of his plan to have six. While the main character is the author of the first five books, his bodyguard authored the sixth one that "give[s] the real ending".

== Reception ==
Kirkus Reviews said, "Previous prognostications of failure and doom notwithstanding, this bustling entry features miraculous survivals and just deserts for the biblio-baddies." In a positive review, Connie Reid of YA Books Central wrote, "This was a great conclusion to the Alcatraz series and it followed naturally that Bastille was the narrator. I especially enjoyed it when the talents were back. This book was a quick read with a very narrow focus to face Biblioden."

The YA Books Central's Mark Buxton noted that familiarity with the earlier books in the series is crucial for understanding the sixth book. He stated, "I enjoy humor that makes me think, so this book's absurd wit is up my alley. Starting the series from the beginning will be a huge help, as the adventure moves along in a familiar style. The characters and story are highly delightful, and I highly recommend you give the book, and series, a shot."
