= Warbreaker =

2009 fantasy novel by Brandon Sanderson

- First edition cover
- Author: Brandon Sanderson
- Illustrator: Shawn Boyles
- Cover artist: Dan Dos Santos
- Language: English
- Genre: Fantasy novel
- Publisher: Tor Books
- Publication date: June 9, 2009 (first edition, hardback)
- Publication place: United States
- Media type: Print (hardcover and paperback), audiobook, e-book
- Pages: 592 pp (first edition, hardback)
- ISBN: 978-0-7653-2030-8 (first edition, hardback)
- OCLC: 276334993
- Dewey Decimal: 813/.6 22
- LC Class: PS3619.A533 W37 2009

Warbreaker is a fantasy novel written by American author Brandon Sanderson. It was published on June 9, 2009 by Tor Books.

Sanderson released several rewrites of Warbreaker under a Creative Commons license (CC BY-NC-ND 3.0 US), one chapter at a time. The entire novel, including older drafts, is available in digital format from Sanderson's website. Warbreaker has been well received by reviewers.

Warbreaker's latest published version is 2019's "10th Anniversary Dragonsteel's Leatherbound" edition which has many changes compared to previous editions. Additionally, there is an unpublished edition with minor changes added to the 2019's edition. The 2026 Tor paperback edition uses many of the changes from the 2019 leatherbound edition.

== Plot summary ==
Warbreaker tells the story of two Idrian princesses, Vivenna and Siri. Vivenna was contracted through a treaty written before she was born to marry the God King of rival nation Hallandren. However, King Dedelin sends his other daughter Siri to meet the treaty instead.

Vivenna follows her to Hallandren in the hope of saving Siri from her fate. Upon arriving in Hallandren, Vivenna meets with Lemex, one of her father's spies in the city, but he has taken ill and dies shortly thereafter — though not before bequeathing his large sum of BioChromatic Breath to her (which is considered heretical by the Idrians).

Vivenna joins up with Denth and Tonk Fah, mercenaries that were under Lemex's employ, and together they begin making guerilla attacks against Hallandren's supply depots and convoys that will hopefully give the Idrians an advantage in the seemingly inevitable war.

Siri, after spending many terrified nights waiting for the God King to procreate with her, finds that he is not actually the menacing, frightening God that she thought, but has actually had his tongue cut out by his priests, making him nothing more than a figurehead. Though he is intelligent, he possesses a childlike outlook because his education was withheld. Siri teaches the God King to communicate by writing, and over time they learn to care for each other and fall in love. However, Siri believes that the priests are secretly plotting to kill her and the God King if she produces an heir, and fears that Hallandren will soon launch a war against Idris. Siri finds a potential ally in the unorthodox god Lightsong, who is plagued by nightmares of war and is struggling to discover his purpose.

Back in the city, Vivenna discovers that Denth and Tonk Fah are not working for her but against her, having been hired by an unknown third party to instigate the war with Idris, and she barely escapes their custody with her life. After hiding and living destitute in the Idrian slums of Hallandren for weeks, Vivenna is taken in by Vasher, a mysterious man who can use his BioChromatic Breath to Awaken objects, an art at which he is incredibly skilled. He wields a sword called Nightblood, a weapon created in a BioChromatic experiment and which possesses sentience. Together, Vivenna and Vasher work to undo the damage done by Denth and avert the war.

Vivenna convinces Vasher to try and save her sister Siri from the God King's palace. However, Vasher is captured and tortured by Denth, who is revealed to have been working for the God King's Pahn Kahl servants, who are trying to incite war between the Idrians and Hallendren so that they can take the city for themselves.

The Pahn Kahl servants capture Siri, kill many of the God King's priests, and throw the God King in the dungeon. Lightsong and many of the other gods are taken captive as well. The Pahn Kahl, having gained the Commands to control the city's undead Lifeless army, send them to attack the Idrians and start the war. However, Lightsong, imprisoned in the dungeon alongside the God King, sacrifices himself by giving the God King his BioChromatic Breath. This heals the king, giving him his tongue back and allowing him access to his godly cache of BioChromatic power. The God King uses his magic to save Siri from the Pahn Kahl servants just as she is about to be murdered. Meanwhile, Vivenna uses her own budding BioChromatic powers to break into the God King's palace and free Vasher, who kills Denth.

Vivenna and Siri are reunited. However, even with the God King's near unlimited power, the Lifeless army cannot be stopped. Vasher then reveals that he is actually one of the Five Scholars — ancient beings who originally discovered the Commands for using BioChromatic Breath — and bestows upon the God King the code to awaken the city's secret army of nearly indestructible D'denir Lifeless soldiers, which have been hidden in plain sight throughout the city as statues. These soldiers are sent to destroy the Lifeless army before it can reach Idris.

While Siri and the God King begin a new rule and life together, Vivenna joins Vasher as he sets out on another quest to a distant land.

== Setting ==
Planet Nalthis provides a main setting for Warbreaker. It is resided by the shard Endowment which her influence has affected the magic system known as Biochroma. In addition to its enhancement from Biochroma, every human born on Nalthis is born with one Breath, the source of energy for Awakening and Returning. The geography and ecology of Nalthis is largely unknown. Hallandren, one of the most powerful kingdoms ever established, is unique in the known world of Nalthis as being the only place that Tears of Edgli will grow, as well as being the only known jungle climate and sea trades. The growth of plants in this region is partly helped by Investiture. To Hallandren's east, there is an inland sea that features several islands. At least a third of the coastline is controlled by Hallandren, which has its capital city built abutting the water. The area suffers frequent earthquakes.

=== Awakening ===
The book uses a system of magic, "Awakening", which allows Awakeners to bring life to objects as well as provide benefits directly to the mages while they hold "BioChromatic Breath", the source of their power, such as perfect pitch, perfect color recognition, perfect life recognition, and agelessness. Use of Awakening drains the colors from surrounding objects and the less colorful an object is, the more difficult it is to apply Awakening to it. The system has been praised as a unique and original magical system.

== Characters ==
- Siri: The youngest daughter of King Dedelin of Idris, who has a reputation for misbehavior, and struggles to fit in with the reserved Idrians. Siri finds herself unexpectedly sent away to Hallandren, where she is to marry the God King.
- Vivenna: The eldest daughter of King Dedelin of Idris, and the one who is most beloved of her father. She is considered a model Idrian citizen, reserved, temperate, and modest. She has been trained her whole life with the expectation of being sent to Hallandren to be a bride to the God King.
- Susebron: The God King of Hallandren, a Returned ruler who possesses more Breath than any living being.
- Lightsong the Bold: A Returned god of bravery, who doubts his own divinity and enjoys challenging the Hallandren expectations of godhood.
- Llarimar: The devoted and pious high priest of Lightsong the Bold.
- Treledees: The high priest of Susebron.
- Denth: An amiable and highly skilled mercenary who falls under the employment of Vivenna.
- Tonk Fah: Denth's musclebound but less bright partner.
- Bluefingers: A moderately ranked servant in the God King's palace, of Pahn Kahl origins.
- Blushweaver: An incredibly beautiful Returned goddess, who is close friends with Lightsong.
- Parlin: An Idrian friend and companion to Vivenna.
- Vasher: A mysterious and very powerful Awakener who pursues unknown goals in Hallandren. He wields the sword Nightblood.
- Nightblood: A magical, incredibly powerful sentient sword, wielded by Vasher.

== Major themes ==
According to Sanderson, "Warbreaker's substructure is that of reversals." In the early chapters, Sanderson begins to show a swap in the roles and attitudes of the main characters Siri and Vivenna. Through the contrast between the Hallandren and Idrian civilizations, a few major themes are displayed. One is the misunderstandings that can occur between two cultures, and the biases that can result from these. This is in part shown by the mistreatment of Idrian workers, who are thought to be boring, untrustworthy, and stuffy. Another is how two cultures may interpret history differently—the Hallandrens think of the Idrians as rebels, while the Idrians think of themselves as the rightful rulers.

== Development history ==
Some concepts for what would become Warbreaker originated in an unfinished manuscript Sanderson wrote in 2001, entitled Mythwalker. Sanderson had previously written several other stories that broke with genre such as Elantris, but at that time had yet to manage to publish any of them. The manuscript, Mythwalker, was therefore written as a more traditional fantasy epic, but Sanderson found the text boring and never finished it. A Mythwalker subplot involved the characters Siri and Vivenna, and a switch-up where the wrong woman married an emperor. Sanderson decided to revisit these characters in Warbreaker, when he began writing the new book in 2006. His decision to release the book for free was inspired by Cory Doctorow, with Sanderson also releasing the early drafts in a bid to inspire future writers and publicise the full release as well as his other works. The unfinished Mythwalker manuscript was released in full on Sanderson's website with commentary by Peter Ahlstrom in 2013.

== Reception ==
Orson Scott Card said that he initially found some aspects of the magic system disappointing because he felt it was too far-fetched to obtain magical power from color. He did not mind it as much when it turned out that the draining of color was a symptom of magic use rather than the source of the power. He stated that "As with all good fantasy fiction, the story isn't about the magic; that's just the rule set within which the real story takes place. That story is absolutely up to Sanderson's very high standard, with political intrigue, carefully differentiated cultures and believable human motivations."

Michael Moorcock also praised Warbreaker, saying: "Brandon Sanderson has written a heroic fantasy depending on originality of character and plot. His "heroines and heroes are outstanding – especially Vasher, the Warbreaker, whose special relationship with his sentient sword is both sardonic and sinister. The mysteries of life after death, of identity and destiny, the politics of magic, are unveiled through three-dimensional characters." He finished, "Not only has Sanderson drawn a freshly imagined world and its society, he has also given us a plot full of unexpected twists and turns ... Anyone looking for a different and refreshing fantasy novel will be delighted by this exceptional tale of magic, mystery and the politics of divinity. Warbreaker might even take your breath away."

SFFWorld called the book "well-wrought, intelligent, and at times, surprising," noting how it was "a conspiracy novel with hints of slight hints 1984 wrapped in a wonderful fantasy package."

== Sequel ==
Sanderson has discussed the possibility of writing another book in the same world as Warbreaker. It would not be a sequel (in the strictest definition of the term), as the first book was written as a stand-alone novel. Sanderson has not stated anything about possible location, events, or characters involved. A possible name for the second book is Nightblood, which refers to the living sword Nightblood that is carried by Vasher, one of Warbreaker's main characters. Asked about it at a book signing in 2018, he indicated that it might not be released until after the sixth Stormlight Archive book. In 2024, he said that it is scheduled for after 2031.

Aspects of Warbreaker - particularly two of its characters and the sword Nightblood - have appeared in some books in The Stormlight Archive, which shares a universe in Sanderson's linked 'Cosmere'.

== Audiobooks ==
GraphicAudio has released Warbreaker as a dramatized audio production. It was adapted and produced with a full cast, narrator, sound effects and music.

Recorded Books has also published an authorized audiobook of Warbreaker. The first version was read by James Yaegashi. A second version was released in 2015; this version was read by Alyssa Bresnahan.
