= Elantris =

2005 fantasy novel by Brandon Sanderson

- Cover of Elantris
- Author: Brandon Sanderson
- Illustrator: Jeffrey Creer (1st edition); Stephen de las Heras (1st edition); Isaac Stewart
- Cover artist: Stephan Martinière
- Language: English
- Genre: Fantasy
- Publisher: Tor Books
- Publication date: April 21, 2005 (first edition, hardback); May 30, 2006 (first edition, reprint paperback); October 6, 2015 (10th anniversary definitive edition)
- Publication place: United States
- Media type: Print (hardcover, paperback and leatherbound), audiobook, e-book
- Pages: 492 (first edition, hardback); 656 (first edition, paperback); 590 (def. ed., hardback)
- ISBN: 0765311771 (first edition, hardback); 0765350378 (first edition, paperback); 9780765383105 (def. ed., hardback)
- OCLC: 57391959
- Dewey Decimal: 813/.6 22
- LC Class: PS3619.A533 E43 2005

Elantris is a fantasy novel written by American fantasy and science fiction writer Brandon Sanderson. The book was published on April 21, 2005, by Tor Books and was Sanderson's first published book. The book gained generally positive reviews, and has been translated into multiple languages. Two related works, Hope of Elantris and The Emperor's Soul, have been released, and two additional novels in the series have been announced.

The story follows three main characters: Prince Raoden of Arelon, Princess Sarene of Teod, and the priest Hrathen of Fjorden. At the beginning of the story, Raoden is cursed by an ancient transformation known as the Shaod and secretly exiled to the city of Elantris just days before his betrothed, princess Sarene of Teod, arrives for their wedding. As Raoden tries to avoid gangs, keep his sanity, and unite the people of Elantris, Sarene must cope with the loss of her husband-to-be and try to save Arelon from Hrathen, a priest tasked with converting all of Arelon to the religion of Fjorden or dooming it to destruction.

== Plot ==
The book focuses on three principal characters whose stories intertwine. Much of the book occurs in groupings of three chapters, one for each of the three main characters. The majority of the story takes place within the country of Arelon.

== Characters ==
- Prince Raoden: the prince of Arelon, is transformed into an Elantrian at the beginning of the book. After the Reod, Elantrians were cursed with dark splotches on their skin and hair falling out. The cursed cannot die or be killed except by drastic measures, such as burning or beheading. A major part of the curse is that their bodies can not repair themselves, so they continue to feel the pain of a stubbed toe or bruise forever. Over time the minor injuries accumulate, eventually driving them all insane. Elantrians do not need to eat, but they feel torturous hunger when they don't. Once Raoden is transformed, he is immediately sent to Elantris in secret while his father pretends he has suddenly died. Raoden's storyline centers on his efforts to retain his sanity and improve the Elantrian way of life beyond the anarchy to which it succumbed when Elantris fell. He does this by displaying amazing skills as a leader and getting the Elantrians to focus on work, as opposed to their constant suffering. He also manages to calm and disperse or incorporate the gangs which were terrorizing new Elantrians upon their arrival.
- Princess Sarene: the princess of Teod and would have been Raoden's political bride had he not been cursed. Raoden has never personally met her, so it comes as a surprise to her when she discovers upon her arrival in Arelon that they are considered to have been married if either of them dies before the wedding. Widow of a supposedly dead prince and a new member of the mostly ill-suited Arelon nobility, she struggles to find out what exactly is going in all affairs concerning the nobility of Arelon, the downtrodden common people of Arelon and Elantris, and what exactly happened to her now deceased husband. Sarene's storyline follows her attempts to stabilize and improve the monarchy and political system, which encouraged nobles to mistreat the peasants. While spending her time in Arelon, she learns of Gyorn Hrathen, and relies upon her knowledge and skills to prevent his religious revolution.
- Gyorn Hrathen: a Derethi gyorn, otherwise known as a high-ranking priest, arrives in Arelon with a mandate to convert the country to the Derethi religion within three months' time, or his religion's armies will come to destroy the entire nation of Arelon. He parades around the nation to spread propaganda with the intention to make Arelenes hate Elantris and their religion, Shu-Korath, and, in turn, convert to Derethi. He takes advantage of the corrupt nobility of the region in order to reach his end goal, often holding secret meetings with them that involve bribery. Hrathen's storyline focuses on his efforts towards politically maneuvering the Arelene aristocracy, with the ultimate intention being to place a converted Derethi on the throne. The novel occasionally focuses on his inward struggles as he feels he must come to terms with the religion he is supposed to believe, for even he questions his work ethic at times.

=== Aons ===
Aons are central to the book's plot and are the means by which the Elantrians perform magic. Many characters' names are variations on the Aons, as is customary in this fantasy world. The images of the many Aons can be found in the back of the book. Raoden rediscovers many of the Aons while in Elantris, preserved in scrolls that have not been consumed by the decay of the city. He learns to invoke the Aons, but finds they have lost their power, which is the ultimate cause of Elantris' collapse. Near the end of the book, Sarene helps Raoden discover that the shapes of the Aons coincide with physical landmarks and natural features located around the country. A massive fissure in the earth that now cuts through the country 'altered' these landmarks, which in turn caused the Aons to lose their power. By 'reconstructing' the Aons to now incorporate the fissure in their design, Raoden restores the Aons' power. After realizing that Elantris and its surrounding cities are just one big Aon, he draws a giant line to represent the fissure, which restores Elantris and the Elantrians to their former glory.

== The Cosmere ==
Like many of Sanderson's other novels and collections, including Mistborn, The Stormlight Archive, Warbreaker, and Arcanum Unbounded: The Cosmere Collection, Elantris takes place within a universe known as the Cosmere. Although the different novels, novellas, and series within the Cosmere are largely separate narratives, they are related. Further, "Easter egg" references to other Cosmere works are common. A mysterious figure named Hoid appears at some point in each of Sanderson's full novels and series, including in the last chapter of Elantris. His origins and motives remain unclear.

== Releases ==
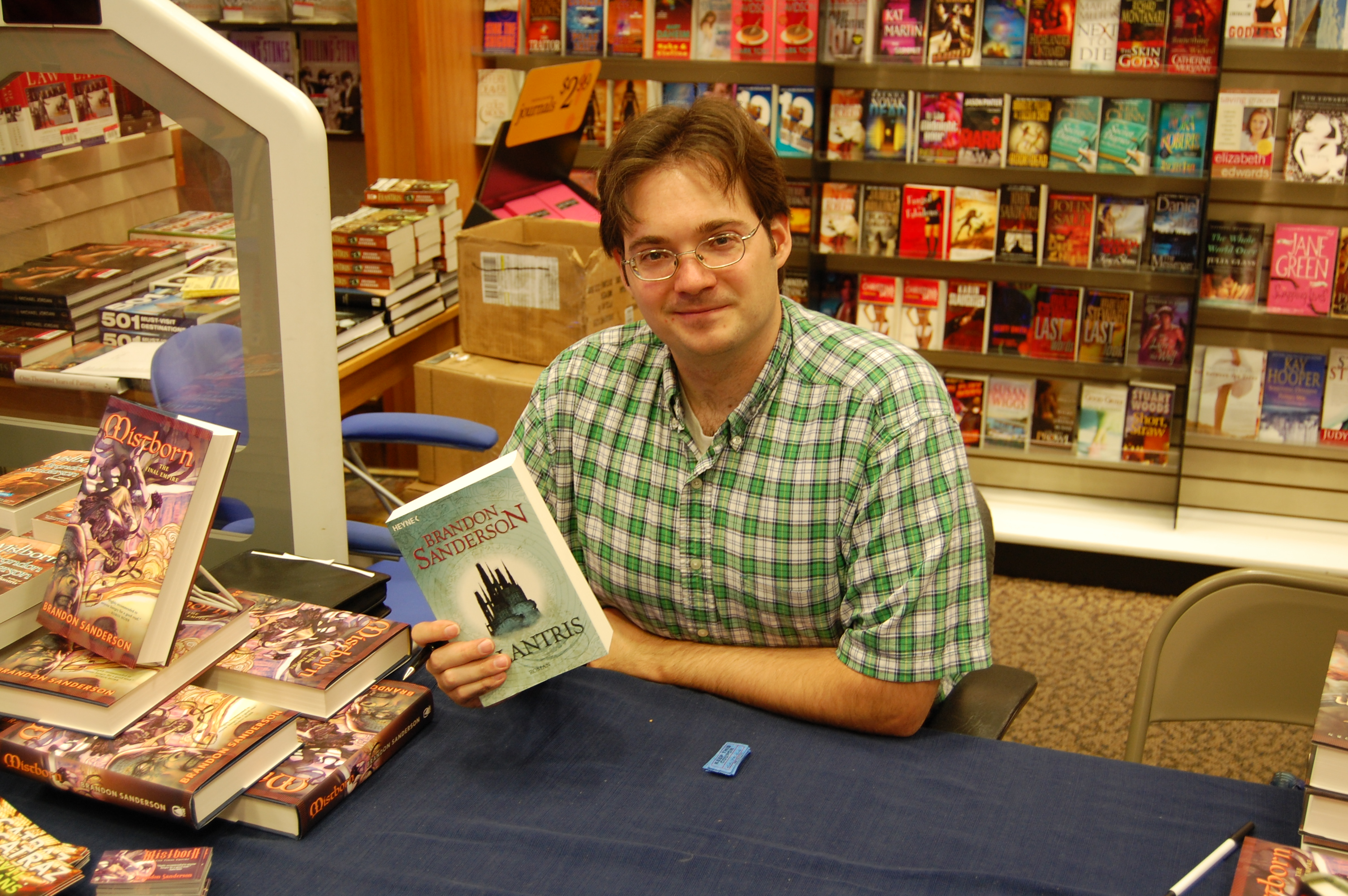
Sanderson with a copy of Elantris at a 2007 book signing in Provo, Utah

Elantris was published by Tor Books in hardcover on April 21, 2005, and it was Sanderson's first published book. Coinciding with the general release, the Science Fiction Book Club released a hardcover edition in May 2005. The Tor mass market paperback was released on May 30, 2006, and the ebook followed in April 2007. In October 2015, a "tenth anniversary author's definitive edition" was released in trade paperback and hardcover, containing "10,000 words of additional content". In December 2015, the Elantris Tenth Anniversary Dragonsteel Leather Edition was released, which included full-color pages of Elantris-related art, new maps, and two-tonal typeset.

It has been translated into Bulgarian, Chinese, Czech, French, Dutch, German, Hebrew, Hungarian, Italian, Japanese, Polish, Romanian, Russian, Spanish, and Turkish.

=== Audiobooks ===
GraphicAudio released Elantris as a dramatized audio production on April 1, 2009. It was adapted and produced with a full cast, narrator, sound effects and music. Recorded Books released a digital audio book of Elantris: Tenth Anniversary Author's Definitive Edition on October 7, 2015, narrated by Jack Garrett.

== Reception ==
Elantris gained generally positive reviews. Orson Scott Card, American novelist, critic, public speaker, essayist, and columnist, states on his website that "Elantris is the finest novel of fantasy to be written in many years. Brandon Sanderson has created a truly original world of magic and intrigue, and with the rigor of the best science fiction writers he has made it real at every level."

Kirkus Reviews praised the book because it was not the first book in a series: "An epic fantasy novel that is (startlingly) not Volume One of a Neverending Sequence with an unusually well-conceived system of magic, the story has some grip and it's a tremendous relief to have fruition in a single volume a cut above the same-old." Publishers Weekly praised Sanderson's fantasy debut as being outstanding and free of the usual genre clichés, noting that it offers something for everyone, including mystery, magic, romance, politics, religious conflict and robust characters.

== Sequels ==
Sanderson has discussed an official sequel to Elantris, though he is not sure when it might be written. He has stated that it would take place ten years after the current book's events, and center around some of its very minor characters. He later announced plans for two books following Elantris, with Kiin's children being the main characters in Elantris Two.

=== The Hope of Elantris ===
An e-book short story was released in 2007 entitled The Hope of Elantris. It was initially for sale on Amazon, but Sanderson released it on his own site when the contract with Amazon ran out. Sanderson describes on his website that the events that take place in the e-book happen concurrently with events in Elantris, hence he suggests reading Elantris first for risk of spoiling certain aspects of the story. The inspiration for the story comes from a story told to him by his wife Emily when they were dating in 2006.

=== The Emperor's Soul ===
In 2012, Sanderson published the novella titled The Emperor's Soul that takes place in the world of Elantris, but in a very different region. Shai is a thief and practitioner of magical forgery who has been arrested and sentenced to death. She is given 100 days to forge a new soul for the Emperor, who is in a coma following an assassination attempt.

Sanderson notes that the reader does not need to read Elantris to understand the plot.

The Emperor's Soul won the 2013 Hugo Award for the best novella.
