= Alcatraz Versus the Shattered Lens =

2010 novel by Brandon Sanderson

- Cover of the novel
- Author: Brandon Sanderson
- Cover artist: Scott Brundage
- Language: English
- Series: Alcatraz Versus
- Genre: Fantasy novel
- Publisher: Scholastic Press
- Publication date: December 1, 2010 (first edition, hardback)
- Publication place: United States
- Media type: Print (Hardback)
- Pages: 320 (first edition, hardback)
- ISBN: 978-0-439-92557-0 (first edition, hardback)
- Preceded by: Alcatraz Versus the Knights of Crystallia
- Followed by: Alcatraz Versus the Dark Talent

Alcatraz Versus the Shattered Lens is a juvenile fiction novel written by American author Brandon Sanderson, published in December 2010 by Scholastic Press. It is the fourth book in the Alcatraz Versus the Evil Librarians series featuring the protagonist Alcatraz Smedry.

== Plot summary ==
Alcatraz and his companions head off to Mokia, one of the Free Kingdoms, to try and save it from a Librarian takeover. They arrive at Tuki Tuki, the city on which Mokia depends, which is besieged by Librarians. When they arrive, the king is considering surrender. An accident puts Alcatraz in charge, and he decides to keep fighting the Librarians. He comes up with a plan to destroy the robots surrounding the city, who are barraging the city with boulders.

His plan succeeds, but the shield gets partially destroyed and Bastille is put in a coma. He begins to come to terms with his talent, and after transmitting his talent to all of the Crystin knights fighting in Mokia, every Librarian weapon in Mokia is destroyed, and the Librarians retreat.

Though he saved Mokia, Alcatraz still has problems. The Smedry Talents have stopped working, and the king and queen of Mokia, as well as Bastille, are still in comas.

== New characters ==
Several new characters are introduced in this novel, including:

- Aydee Ecks, another Smedry relation, who has the talent of being bad at math, and who flies Alcatraz to Tuki Tuki
- "General Mallo", secretly the king of Mokia, stands to lead his people - until a raid puts him in a coma.

== Reception ==
In a positive review, The Horn Book Magazine's Anita L. Burkham wrote, "Alcatraz's seat-of-the-pants narration—with references to 'wombats, outer space, and stamp collections' in chapters that don't exist, direct requests to readers (to change their underwear daily, for instance), and self-referential comments on the literary nature of the book—might make the series appear at first to be a zany, kid-pandering mess, but the charismatic characters hold the whole enterprise together while the stealth plot unfolds." Children's Bookwatch said the book was an "absorbing story of gigantic robots, evil librarians, and danger".

Connie Reid of YA Books Central praised the book's chapter names, noting "the naming schema definitely created a few giggles in this book". She said, "I like that he continues to take the construct of writing and highlight aspects of it while telling the story." Amanda Raklovits of School Library Journal said that the author "strikes the right balance between Alcatraz's naturally snarky tone and the surprisingly serious moments as the boy comes to terms with his mounting responsibility and shifting perspective". She concluded that the book was "for those who prefer their fantasy with a dash of slapstick, plenty of metafictional humor, and a heap of irreverence".
