= Mistborn Adventure Game =

Tabletop role-playing game

The Mistborn Adventure Game is a pen-and-paper role-playing game published in 2011 by Crafty Games. It is a licensed release based on American author Brandon Sanderson's Mistborn novel series. Sanderson was involved in the game's creation. The game's setting, Scadrial, is the same as that of the Mistborn series. The initial Mistborn Adventure Game book was released on December 16, 2011. Since 2011, four supplementary material books have been published. The first supplement was released March 2014 and is called Terris: Wrought of Copper. The second supplement was released on August 7, 2014 and is called Alloy of Law, not to be confused with the fourth Mistborn book called The Alloy of Law. The third supplement was released on December 22, 2015 and is called Skaa: Tin & Ash. The fourth supplement is called The Alloy of Law: Masks of the Past and was released on August 8, 2017.

== Gameplay ==
The gameplay is largely built on narrative-based roleplay; however, active gameplay is based on rolling dice from a pool of 2–10 six-sided dice. The number of dice rolled is determined by a character's abilities. Conflict is resolved in a similar dice-rolling fashion.

=== Character creation ===
Individual characters can be from the various social classes, such as Noble or Skaa, that exist in Scadrial. Although characters must conform to the setting to an extent, the backgrounds and personality of characters are largely created by the player's imagination with little constraint. Each character has different Attributes, Standings, Traits, and Powers that influence the active gameplay.

Attribute	Standing	Trait	Powers
Physique	Resources	Personality	Allomancy
Charm	Influence	Skills	Feruchemy
Wits	Spirit	Drive	Hemalurgy
		Various others, player defined	Mimicry

== Published materials ==
All materials have been created and published by Crafty Games. In addition, all supplementary works include the title of the game itself which is also the name of the first book. The actual title of each supplement is printed beneath the game title.

Book name	Purpose	Release date
Mistborn Adventure Game	Contains three parts; the first explains the core rules, the second describes magic, and the third provides information for the gamemaster	August 1, 2012
Terris: Wrought of Copper	Provides additional information and rules regarding the Terris Dominance and creating a Terris hero	March 5, 2014
Alloy of Law	Updates the rules and setting to match the new Mistborn novels that are set 300 years after the original trilogy	August 7, 2014
Skaa: Tin & Ash	Provides additional information about skaa, including skaa-unique Traits and adds several new Networks. Also includes the campaign "Beasts of Burden"	December 22, 2015
The Alloy of Law: Masks of the Past	A supplement for the Alloy of Law campaign setting. It expands on the events and secrets in the novels Shadows of Self and The Bands of Mourning.	August 8, 2017
Nobles: The Golden Mandate	The final supplement for the Mistborn Adventure Game. This book dives deep into the history and intrigues of Mistborn’s most notable families.	September 18, 2023

== Reception ==
Shannon Appelcline commented that, while the gameplay of the Mistborn Adventure Game is "a big departure for Crafty", the game was "well-received and seems to have gotten more retail notice than most of Crafty's other releases to date, likely due to its strong license."
