= Yumi and the Nightmare Painter =

2023 novel by Brandon Sanderson

- Author: Brandon Sanderson
- Illustrator: Aliya Chen
- Cover artist: Aliya Chen
- Language: English
- Series: Cosmere
- Genre: Fantasy
- Published: July 1, 2023 (Dragonsteel; available to Kickstarters)
- Publisher: Dragonsteel Entertainment
- Publication place: United States
- Media type: Print (hardcover), audiobook, e-book
- Pages: 479 pp
- ISBN: 978-1-938570-37-7

Yumi and the Nightmare Painter is a fantasy novel written by American author Brandon Sanderson. It is part of the Cosmere fictional universe and the third book of Sanderson's "Secret Projects" Kickstarter campaign. It was exclusively released on July 1, 2023, by Dragonsteel Entertainment to Kickstarter backers. In 2025 Sanderson established that the book is part of Hoid's Travails, a series narrated by the character Hoid.

== Plot ==
The story takes place on planet Komashi, a world enshrouded by a dark mist. In Kilahito, a city that exists within the shroud, humans are kept warm and provided light by the hion lines, which are magenta or blue lines of concentrated power. (Note: These lines are a form of Investiture, a common aspect in many of Sanderson’s works) The shroud regularly produces coherent nightmare creatures that can hurt or kill humans. Nikaro is a Painter, a group of people that use sumi-e painting to trap and disable the nightmares, thereby preventing them from hurting more people. He lives by himself and tries not to interact with the other Painters.

Yumi is a yoki-hijo, a woman with the ability to call and bind spirits to do various tasks, attracting them by creating intricate stacks of rocks. She lives in Torio, which has far less technology than Kilahito and is not surrounded by black mist. Yumi is contacted by one of the spirits, which begs her to help them. After this, she and Nikaro swap bodies when they go to sleep. When Nikaro is in Yumi's body, the residents of Torio see him as Yumi. When Yumi is in Nikaro's body, the body changes into Yumi's shape, which effectively means that Nikaro has disappeared from his job and responsibilities. While trying to escape their situation, they are taught how to do the other person’s job. Nikaro learns to stack rocks and call spirits, while Yumi befriends Nikaro’s estranged colleagues. Scholars arrive in Yumi’s village with a machine that can summon spirits, hoping to replace the yoki-hijo. Nikaro and Yumi suspect that there is something suspicious about these scholars.

Concurrently in Kilahito, Yumi attempts to repel a particularly dangerous “stable” nightmare, who grows in strength while avoiding detection from Nikaro’s colleagues. Yumi and Nikaro learn that the scholars' Machine demonstrated artificially powerful stone stacking abilities, effectively holding the world’s spirits hostage. This eventually led to the transformation of many of Torio's citizens into nightmares. Yumi’s intense connection to the spirits saved her from this fate. While Yumi and Nikaro assumed they were from different planets, further investigation reveals that Yumi is over 1,700 years old, and had (until the beginning of the story) instead repeated the same day for centuries, losing her memory each night to prevent her from freeing the spirits.

The Machine returns Yumi and Nikaro to their original bodies and forces Yumi back into the time loop. Nikaro confronts a nightmare that cared for Yumi in the past and is able to encourage it to remind her of her situation. Nikaro, able to reconnect with his colleagues, then successfully dispels the stable nightmare. Meanwhile, Yumi confronts the Machine, stacking rocks so effectively that she is able to drain it of its energy and free the nightmares to die in peace. Yumi dies, but Nikaro is seized by inspiration and spiritual energy, and he is able to bring her back to life through a masterpiece work of art.

== Publication ==
In spring 2022, Brandon Sanderson announced a Kickstarter campaign of "Secret Projects" to publish four secret and brand-new novels written during the COVID-19 pandemic. The campaign reached its goal within a day, and accumulated a total of $41.7 million. Yumi and the Nightmare Painter is the third of the Secret Projects and is part of Sanderson's fictional Cosmere universe. The novel is loosely inspired by the Hikaru no Go manga and is narrated by Hoid, a recurring character who has appeared in multiple Cosmere series novels.

Kickstarter campaign backers received premium editions of the novel published by Dragonsteel Entertainment on July 1, 2023 and a standard hardback edition published by Tor Books was officially released on October 3, 2023.
