= The Dark Talent =

2016 juvenile fiction novel by Brandon Sanderson

Alcatraz Versus the Dark Talent
- Author: Brandon Sanderson
- Audio read by: Ramon de Ocampo
- Illustrator: Hayley Lazo
- Cover artist: Scott Brundage
- Language: English
- Series: Alcatraz
- Release number: 5
- Genre: science fiction, fantasy
- Publisher: Tor Books
- Publication date: September 2016
- Publication place: USA
- Media type: Print
- Pages: 304
- ISBN: 978-0-7653-8140-8
- Preceded by: Alcatraz Versus the Shattered Lens
- Followed by: Bastille Versus the Evil Librarians

The Dark Talent is a juvenile fiction novel written by Brandon Sanderson and published in September 2016 by Tor Books. The book is named after its main character, Alcatraz Smedry, and is the fifth novel in the Alcatraz series.

== Plot summary ==
Alcatraz is going to the center of Librarian power. After the Librarians fire missiles at Tuki Tuki, the Smedrys, led by Alcatraz, must leave at once. They fly to Washington D.C. to enter the Highbrary, a huge cave complex beginning at the Library of Congress and continuing beneath the city. Among the endless sections and subsections of the ultimate library among the nooks and crannies of the cave, Alcatraz, Grandpa Smedry, and Alcatraz's uncle Kazan, along with the Crystin knight Draulin and the quirky Dif Smedry search for Alcatraz's father Attica, to stop him from unknowingly using his research to end Free Kingdom civilization.

Alcatraz and his mother locate Alcatraz's father, who knocks out his mother to prevent her from stopping him. He then tries to explain to Alcatraz what he is doing, in hopes of showing him he is doing the "right" thing. Dif comes, along with Grandpa Smedry, and after confirming everyone is there, Dif shoots Grandpa Smedry in the head and reveals himself to be Biblioden, the leader of the Librarians.The members of the team are captured, and Biblioden prepares a ritual for a bloodforged lens. He lets Alcatraz and his father choose which of them will be sacrificed, and Alcatraz, in a moment of weakness, chooses his father. Eventually the remainder of the shattered team locates Alcatraz, sitting in front of his father's corpse. They quickly leave before the Highbrary is self-destructed by a system put into motion by Grandpa Smedry.

In an extra page at the very end of the book, it is revealed that after Grandpa Smedry was shot, his Smedry Talent, accidentally broken by Alcatraz, comes back, making him arrive late to his death and survive.

== New Non-Smedrys ==
- Biblioden, introduced in the book as "Dif Smedry" a quirky character picked up by the Smedrys for the infiltration, who seems to be overdoing his Smedry-like mannerisms and eventually turns out to be the founder of the Librarians.

== Smedrys ==
The Smedrys all have a special "talent". This talent may seem unhelpful at first, but it helps them in strange ways in the series. Here are the Smedrys featured in the book and their "Talents".

- Alcatraz, the main character, has the ability to break things, which can sometimes help him by breaking things in special ways.
- Leavenworth, or "Grandpa Smedry", has the ability to arrive late to things, which helps him arrive late to things like wounds and disasters. This allows him to arrive late to his death at the end of the book.
- Attica, Alcatraz's father, has the ability to lose things, which can allow him to find important things again in random places when he needs them.
- Shasta, Alcatraz's mother, is a Librarian, though she still wants to stop Attica and helps Alcatraz temporarily. She is married to Attica, and thus has his talent of losing things.
- Folsom, a book critic, has the ability of dancing badly, which includes uncontrollably attacking people nearby while music is playing.
- Himalaya, a Librarian defector, is married to Folsom and shares his talent of dancing badly. She and Folsom, at the beginning of the book, were helping Librarians defect in the "Hushlands", or the Librarian-controlled areas.
