= Brandon Sanderson =

American fiction writer (born 1975)

- Sanderson in September 2026
- Born: Brandon Winn Sanderson; December 19, 1975 (age 50); Lincoln, Nebraska, U.S.
- Education: Brigham Young University (BA, MA)
- Spouse: Emily Bushman (m. 2006)
- Children: 3
- Writing career
- Period: 2005–present
- Genres: Fantasy; science fiction
- Notable works: Mistborn; The Stormlight Archive; Final three books of Robert Jordan's The Wheel of Time; The Reckoners; Rithmatist; White Sand
- Website: brandonsanderson.com

Brandon Winn Sanderson (born December 19, 1975) is an American author of high fantasy, science fiction, and young adult books. His best known novels include the Mistborn series and The Stormlight Archive, which are set in the "Cosmere", a fictional universe. Outside of the Cosmere, he has written several young adult and juvenile series including The Reckoners, the Skyward series, (Note: The Skyward series is published as adult outside of the US.) and the Alcatraz series. He is also known for completing author Robert Jordan's high fantasy series The Wheel of Time. Sanderson has created two graphic novels, White Sand the Dark One and The Rithmatist.

He is credited with coining Sanderson's Laws of Magic, which popularized the idea of "hard" and "soft" magic systems.

In 2008, Sanderson started a creative writing podcast with the horror writer Dan Wells and the cartoonist Howard Tayler called Writing Excuses. In mid-2022, Sanderson and Wells started another podcast, Intentionally Blank, which is focused on writing and pop culture.

Sanderson's writing has received numerous nominations and awards. He has been noted for his prolific level of writing output, having written 71 books as of 2023, several of which have topped The New York Times best seller list. Sanderson's March 2022 Kickstarter campaign to self-publish four novels became one of the most successful in history, finishing with 185,341 backers pledging US$41,754,153. In January 2026, Apple TV purchased the film and television rights to Sanderson's Cosmere universe, in a deal which gives Sanderson extensive creative control over the content.

== Personal life ==
=== Early life ===
Sanderson was born on December 19, 1975, in Lincoln, Nebraska, the eldest of four children born to Barbara and Winn Sanderson. Sanderson was raised as a member of the Church of Jesus Christ of Latter-day Saints (LDS church). As a child he was a "reluctant reader" but became a passionate reader of fantasy in his teens after a teacher gave him a copy of Dragonsbane by Barbara Hambly. He made several early attempts at writing his own stories.

=== Education ===
After graduating from high school in 1994, Sanderson went to Brigham Young University (BYU) and majored in biochemistry. He took a two-year leave of absence from 1995 to 1997 to serve as a volunteer LDS missionary and was assigned to serve in South Korea. According to Sanderson, his experience with Korean language and linguistics helped him build the magic system for Elantris, his first published novel.

In 1997, Sanderson returned to BYU and changed his major to English literature. While an undergraduate, Sanderson took a job as a night auditor at a local hotel in Provo, Utah, which allowed him to write while working. One of Sanderson's roommates at BYU was Ken Jennings (famous for his appearance on the show Jeopardy! and as the host since 2021). He graduated in 2000 with a Bachelor of Arts. He continued on as a graduate student, receiving an M.A. in English with an emphasis in creative writing in 2004. Sanderson's honors thesis, Dragonsteel, was the first in BYU's history to be rebound as it was being read so frequently by students at the university library. While at BYU, Sanderson was on the staff of Leading Edge, a semi-professional speculative fiction magazine published by the university, and served as its editor-in-chief during 2001.

=== Adult life ===
In 2006, Sanderson married Emily Bushman in the Mount Timpanogos Utah LDS Temple. Emily was an English, Spanish, and ESL teacher, and is a fellow BYU alumna. She later became the business manager for Dragonsteel Entertainment, Sanderson's company. They have three sons and reside in American Fork, Utah. As of 2022, Sanderson was serving as a Sunday School teacher in his LDS ward.

== Career ==
=== Early writing career ===
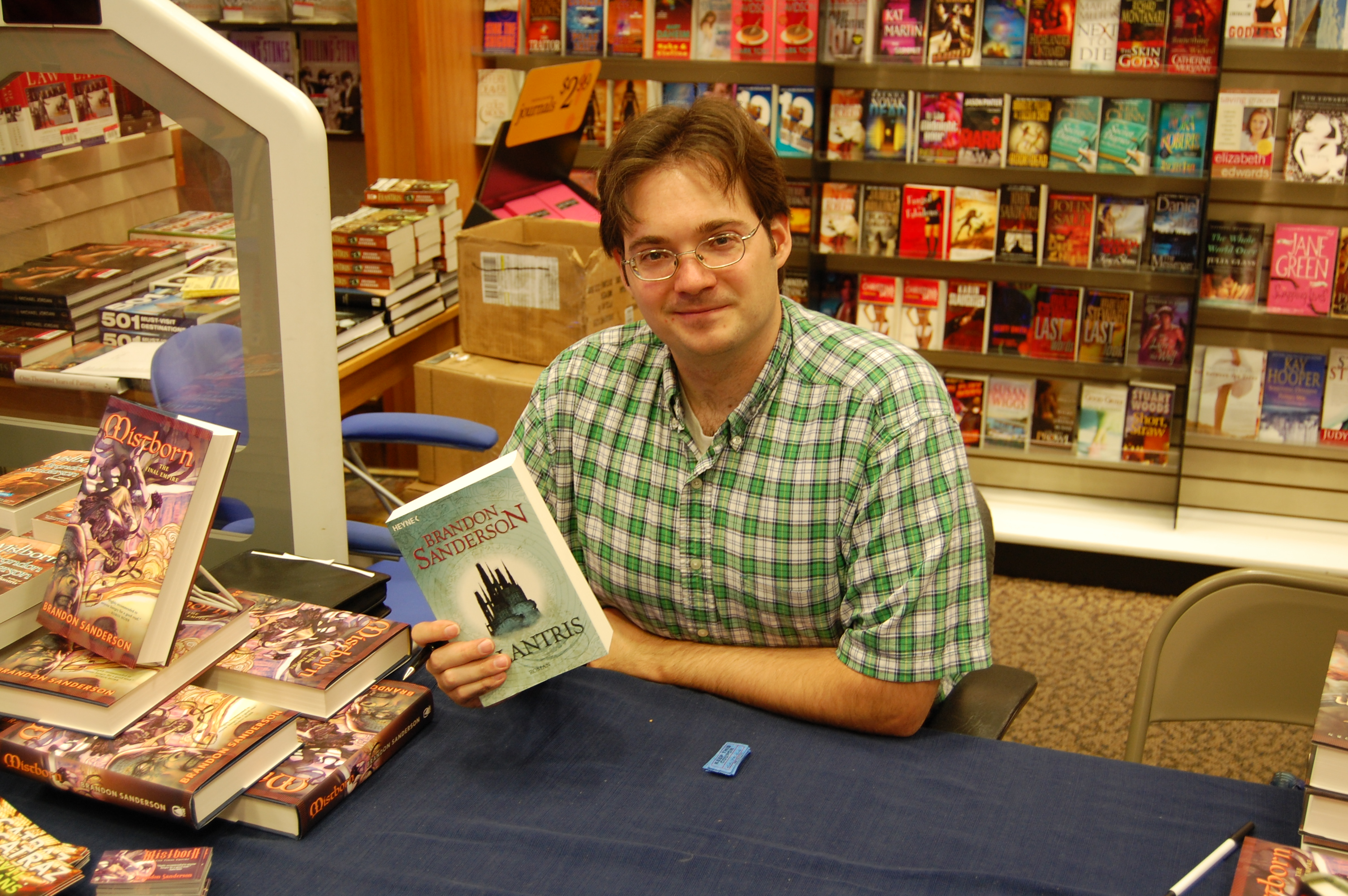
Sanderson in 2007

Sanderson wrote consistently throughout his undergraduate and graduate studies; by 2003, he had written twelve novels, though no publisher had accepted any of them for publication. While in the middle of a graduate program at BYU, he was contacted by Tor Books editor Moshe Feder, who wanted to acquire one of his books. Sanderson had submitted the manuscript of his sixth novel, Elantris, a year and a half earlier. Elantris was published by Tor Books on April 21, 2005, to generally positive reviews. This was followed in 2006 by Mistborn: The Final Empire, the first book in his Mistborn fantasy trilogy, in which "allomancers"—people with the ability to "burn" metals and alloys after ingesting them—gain enhanced senses and control over powerful supernatural forces.

He published the second book of the Mistborn series, The Well of Ascension, in 2007. Later that year, Sanderson published the children's novel Alcatraz Versus the Evil Librarians, about a boy named Alcatraz with a talent for breaking things. Alcatraz confronts a group of evil librarians who are bent on taking over the world. The first of his "Laws of Magic" was first published in 2007, with the second and third published in 2012 and 2013 (respectively). In 2008, the third and final book in the Mistborn trilogy was published, titled The Hero of Ages, as well as the second book in the Alcatraz series, titled Alcatraz Versus the Scrivener's Bones. In 2009, Tor Books published Warbreaker, which originally appeared serially on Sanderson's website while he was writing the novel from 2006 to 2009. In the same year, the third Alcatraz book was published, titled Alcatraz Versus the Knights of Crystallia.

=== The Wheel of Time ===
Sanderson rose to prominence in late 2007 when Harriet McDougal, the wife and editor of author Robert Jordan, chose Sanderson to complete the final books in Jordan's epic fantasy series The Wheel of Time after Jordan's death. McDougal asked Sanderson to finish the series after being deeply impressed by his first Mistborn novel, The Final Empire. Tor Books made the announcement on December 7, 2007. After reviewing what was necessary to complete the series, Sanderson and Tor announced on March 30, 2009, that a final three books would be published instead of just one.

The first of these, The Gathering Storm, was published on October 27, 2009, and reached the number-one spot on the New York Times bestseller list for hardcover fiction. Towers of Midnight, the second-to-last The Wheel of Time book, was published just over a year after The Gathering Storm on November 2, 2010, debuting at number one on the bestseller list. In early 2013, the series was completed with the publication of A Memory of Light.

=== 2010s ===
In 2010, Sanderson published The Way of Kings, the first of a planned ten-book series called The Stormlight Archive. It achieved the number seven slot on the New York Times hardcover fiction bestseller list. The fourth Alcatraz novel, Alcatraz Versus the Shattered Lens, followed soon after.

In October 2011, he finished a novella e-book, Infinity Blade: Awakening, based on the action role-playing, iOS video game Infinity Blade, developed by Chair Entertainment and Epic Games. In November 2011, he published a sequel to the Mistborn trilogy, Mistborn: The Alloy of Law. It was originally planned as a standalone novel set about 300 years after the original trilogy, but it was later expanded into a four-book series. It debuted at number nine on the combined print and e-book New York Times Best Seller list.

On August 31, 2012, Sanderson published a science fiction novella entitled Legion, followed by another short work titled The Emperor's Soul, which won the 2013 Hugo Award for best novella. In 2013, Sanderson published two new young adult series, The Rithmatist and The Reckoners. In March 2014, Words of Radiance, the second book in The Stormlight Archive, was published.

Later that year, Subterranean Press published the second novella in the Legion series, Legion: Skin Deep. It was a preliminary nominee for the 2015 Hugo Awards, but did not make the final ballot. In January 2015, the second book of The Reckoners, titled Firefight, was published. Firefight won the 2015 Whitney Award in the Best Young Adult—Speculative category. It also placed eighth in the Young Adult Fantasy & Science Fiction category of the Goodreads Choice Awards and was a finalist for the 2015 AML Award in the Young Adult Novel category.

Nine months later, Sanderson published Mistborn: Shadows of Self as a direct sequel to The Alloy of Law. The novel won the 2017 Neffy Award in the Best Novel category, placed third in the 2015 Goodreads Choice Awards in the Fantasy category, was a finalist in the Best Speculative Fiction category of the 2015 Whitney Awards, and was a preliminary nominee for the 2016 Gemmell Legend Award. On November 16, 2015, Sanderson's agency (JABberwocky Literary Agency) announced that Sanderson had officially sold over 7 million copies worldwide.

On January 26, 2016, Mistborn: The Bands of Mourning was published as the sequel to Shadows of Self. On February 16, 2016, the third book of the Reckoners series, titled Calamity, was published. In June 2016, Sanderson's first graphic novel, White Sand—written with Rik Hoskin—was released, announced to be the first of a planned trilogy. The graphic novels are based on an original manuscript by Sanderson. On September 6, 2016, the fifth Alcatraz book was published, called Alcatraz Versus the Dark Talent.

In 2016, DMG Entertainment optioned the Cosmere property for film and television. On November 22, 2016, an anthology of Cosmere short stories and novellas was published, titled Arcanum Unbounded: The Cosmere Collection. The third book in The Stormlight Archive, Oathbringer, was published on November 14, 2017. The first book of the Defiant series, Skyward, was published on November 6, 2018. The second book in the series, Starsight, was released on November 26, 2019.

=== 2020s ===
In September 2020, a collaboration project with author Mary Robinette Kowal, called The Original, was released. Rhythm of War, the fourth Stormlight novel, was published on November 17, 2020. In 2020, Sanderson's agency updated his number of copies sold to over 18 million worldwide, in early 2021 to over 21 million, and in late 2025 to over 50 million.

In March 2021, Sanderson announced a "Weekly Update" on his YouTube channel which would give updates on his current projects every week. On May 26, he revealed the title and cover for Cytonic, the third book of his Skyward series, which was published on November 23, 2021.

Sanderson announced in March 2022 that, over the previous two pandemic years, he had secretly written five otherwise-unannounced books (four full adult novels and a shorter junior novel). The full novels (three of which are set in the Cosmere) were made available through a Kickstarter subscription that released them quarterly through 2023. The Kickstarter campaign was highly successful, raising $15 million in its first 24 hours and over $20 million within three days, becoming the all-time most successful Kickstarter campaign at the time. The campaign finished with 185,341 backers pledging $41,754,153. The 4 "Secret Novel Projects" released in the campaign were Tress of the Emerald Sea, The Frugal Wizard’s Handbook for Surviving Medieval England, Yumi and the Nightmare Painter and The Sunlit Man. Before the conclusion of his Kickstarter campaign, Sanderson also backed every single other publishing project on Kickstarter at the time, for a total of 316 projects. In March 2024, Sanderson announced a further 'secret project' novel set for a 2025 release.

Sanderson also collaborated with Unknown Worlds Entertainment to create the lore and setting for the video game Moonbreaker, which was released via early access in September 2022.

In December 2024, Sanderson unveiled Wind and Truth, the final book in the first arc of The Stormlight Archive. Sanderson has said that there will be at least five more books in the series, but that their printing is not expected until 2031.

On January 28, 2026, it was reported that Apple TV has secured development rights for screen adaptations of works by Sanderson, focusing initially on two major series from his Cosmere universe. The agreement seeks to develop feature films based on the Mistborn series and a television series adaptation of The Stormlight Archive, both of which are among Sanderson’s most commercially successful and widely read works. The deal is described as significant within the industry because it grants Sanderson an unusually high degree of creative involvement: he is expected to write, produce, consult on the adaptations, and retain approval rights over key production elements. Production roles have begun to take shape for The Stormlight Archive television project, with the production company Blue Marble Pictures attached and executive producer Theresa Kang linked to the series.

== Dragonsteel Entertainment, LLC ==
Dragonsteel Entertainment, LLC is a company acting as publisher, storefront, and producer for various Sanderson-related products and projects. It is also known as Dragonsteel Books, according to Sanderson's personal blog, as a rebranding tactic in 2021. It holds copyrights to many of Sanderson's novels and has self-published several of his stories in both digital and print formats.

In 2024, Sanderson appeared before 5,000 fans at FanX in Salt Lake City, Utah, at a 50-minute panel. During the panel, Sanderson announced that Dragonsteel Entertainment had purchased land to "theoretically build a bookstore" called Dragonsteel Plaza. Dragonsteel Plaza would be home to a bookstore, outside market, and the headquarters for Dragonsteel Entertainment, LLC.

=== Kickstarter campaigns ===
Sanderson first turned to Kickstarter in 2020, when he generated $6.7 million from almost 30,000 backers to produce a collectable leather-bound 10th anniversary edition of the Stormlight Archive novel The Way of Kings.

In August 2024, Sanderson teamed up with Brotherwise Games to create a tabletop role-playing game (TTRPG) based on the mythical universe the Cosmere, featured in many of his fantasy novels. With over $14.6 million in pledges, the Kickstarter campaign broke the previous record in pledges for a tabletop RPG.

== Community relations ==
In 2015, Brandon Sanderson and wife Emily Sanderson created a charitable organization called The Lightweaver Foundation. Its mission is to "Feed bodies. Fill minds. Fuel hope." Jane Horne is the director of the organization.

The Lightweaver Foundation's first project helped students at Utah Valley University (UVU) and Brigham Young University (BYU) publish their speculative fiction in journals. The foundation set up an endowment fund to support university journals and ensure future publications of these journals continued.

The Lightweaver Foundation is also responsible for raising money to support people and programs, largely within their local community. One of the major beneficiaries for these efforts has been the Intermountain Primary Children’s Hospital. The Lightweaver Foundation has also promoted literacy by supporting a writing conference for teens called StoryCon (formerly Teen Author Bootcamp) and also supporting Book Drop, which hosts popular authors to speak at schools and give away copies of their published works.

== Cosmere ==
The Cosmere is the name of the universe in which Elantris, Mistborn, Warbreaker, The Stormlight Archive, White Sand, Tress of the Emerald Sea, Yumi and the Nightmare Painter,The Sunlit Man, Isles of the Emberdark, The Fires of December, and stories contained in Arcanum Unbounded: The Cosmere Collection are all set. This idea came from Sanderson's desire to create an epic-length series while also attempting to convince publishers to sell his books as a new writer. Further, Sanderson has cited inspiration from the way Isaac Asimov's separate Robot and Foundation series were eventually tied together; the Cosmere is his attempt at an overarching superstory established at onset of the series. This is unlike Asimov's stories, which were connected ad hoc mid-series. Sanderson has estimated that the Cosmere sequence could conclude with at least 40 books.

The story of the Cosmere is about a mysterious being called Adonalsium, who existed on a world known as Yolen. Adonalsium was killed by a group of at least seventeen conspirators, causing its power to shatter into sixteen different Shards, each of which bears immense power. Sixteen of those people—referred to as Vessels—then took these Shards and traveled to new worlds, populating them with different systems of magic or extending on ones already present. In one case, the Shards known as Ruin and Preservation worked together to create the planet Scadrial, the setting of the Mistborn series.

Each Shard has an Intent, such as Ambition or Honor, and a Vessel's personality is changed over time to bring them more in-line with their Intent. One such Shard, Odium, has killed—or "splintered"—several other Shards. On Sel, he splintered Devotion and Dominion, accidentally creating the Dor, from which Seons and Skaze have emerged. He has also splintered Ambition, in the Threnody system. A man known as Hoid is seen or mentioned in most Cosmere books. He is from Yolen and travels the so-called Shardworlds, using the people of those worlds to further an unknown agenda.

Sanderson has indicated that an upcoming work in the series will be in the cyberpunk genre, a marked departure from the setting of the high-fantasy and urban-fantasy settings that have featured in the Cosmere universe to date.

== Sanderson's Laws of Magic ==
Sanderson makes an express distinction between "soft" and "hard" magic for purposes of world building and creating magic systems in fictional settings. Both terms are approximate ways of characterizing two ends of a spectrum. Hard magic systems follow specific rules; the magic is controlled and explained to the reader in the narrative detailing the mechanics behind the way the magic 'works' and can be used for building settings that revolve around the magic system. Soft magic systems may not have clearly defined rules or limitations, or they may provide limited exposition regarding their workings. They are used to create a sense of wonder in the reader.

Sanderson's three laws of magic are creative writing guidelines that can be used to create magic systems for fantasy stories:

1. An author's ability to solve conflict with magic is directly proportional to how well the reader understands said magic.
2. Weaknesses, limits and costs are more interesting than powers.
3. The author should expand on what is already a part of the magic system before something entirely new is added, as this may otherwise entirely change how the magic system fits into the fictional world.

Additionally, there is a zeroth law:

0. Always err on the side of what's awesome.

== Teaching ==
Sanderson is adjunct faculty at Brigham Young University, teaching a creative writing course once per year.

Sanderson's writing courses are also published to his YouTube channel.

== Podcasts ==
From 2008 to 2022, Sanderson participated in the weekly podcast Writing Excuses with authors Dan Wells, Mary Robinette Kowal, and web cartoonist Howard Tayler. He began hosting the podcast Intentionally Blank with Dan Wells in June 2021, where they discuss random things they enjoy, often while Sanderson signs the front sheets that will eventually be inserted in his books once they are published.

== Selected awards and honors ==
Sanderson has received numerous awards and nominations for his various works. See Writing Excuses for additional awards and nominations.

| Year | Organization | Award title, category | Work | Result | Ref. |
|---|---|---|---|---|---|
| 2005 | Romantic Times | Reviewers' Choice Best Book Award, Best Epic Fantasy Novel Award | Elantris | Won | |
| 2006 | World Science Fiction Society | John W. Campbell Award for Best New Writer | — | Nominated | |
| 2006 | Romantic Times | Reviewers' Choice Best Book Award, Best Epic Fantasy Novel Award | Mistborn | Nominated | |
| 2007 | World Science Fiction Society | John W. Campbell Award for Best New Writer | — | Nominated | |
| 2007 | Romantic Times | Reviewers' Choice Best Book Award, Best Epic Fantasy Novel Award | The Well of Ascension | Nominated | |
| 2007 | LDStorymakers | Whitney Awards, Best Speculative Fiction | The Well of Ascension | Nominated | |
| 2007 | LDStorymakers | Whitney Awards, Best Youth Fiction | Alcatraz Versus the Evil Librarians | Nominated | |
| 2007 | Polytechnic University of Catalonia | UPC Science Fiction Award | Defending Elysium | Won | |
| 2008 | Romantic Times | Reviewers' Choice Best Book Award, Best Epic Fantasy Novel Award | The Hero of Ages | Won | |
| 2008 | LDStorymakers | Whitney Awards, Best Speculative Fiction Award | The Hero of Ages | Won | |
| 2009 | DGLA | David Gemmell Awards for Fantasy, Fantasy Novel | The Hero of Ages | Nominated | |
| 2009 | LDStorymakers | Whitney Awards, Best Speculative Fiction | Warbreaker | Nominated | |
| 2010 | DGLA | David Gemmell Awards for Fantasy, Fantasy Novel | Warbreaker | Nominated | |
| 2010 | DGLA | David Gemmell Awards for Fantasy, Fantasy Novel | The Gathering Storm | Nominated | |
| 2010 | LDStorymakers | Whitney Awards, Best Speculative Fiction Award | The Way of Kings | Won | |
| 2010 | LDStorymakers | Whitney Awards, Best Novel of the Year Award | The Way of Kings | Won | |
| 2010 | Goodreads | Goodreads Choice Awards 2010, Best Fantasy of 2010 | Towers of Midnight | Won | |
| 2011 | DGLA | David Gemmell Awards for Fantasy, Legend Award for Best Fantasy Novel | The Way of Kings | Won | |
| 2011 | DGLA | David Gemmell Awards for Fantasy, Legend Award for Best Fantasy Novel | Towers of Midnight | Nominated | |
| 2011 | LDStorymakers | Whitney Awards, Best Speculative Fiction Award | The Alloy of Law | Won | |
| 2012 | DGLA | David Gemmell Awards for Fantasy, Legend Award For Best Novel | The Alloy of Law | Nominated | |
| 2012 | Goodreads | Goodreads Choice Awards 2012, Best Fantasy of 2012 | The Emperor's Soul | Nominated | |
| 2013 | World Science Fiction Society | Hugo Award, Best Novella | The Emperor's Soul | Won | |
| 2013 | World Fantasy Convention | World Fantasy Award, Best Novella | The Emperor's Soul | Nominated | |
| 2013 | Goodreads | Goodreads Choice Awards 2013, Best Fantasy of 2013 | A Memory of Light | Nominated | |
| 2013 | LDStorymakers | Whitney Awards, Best Young Adult—Speculative | Steelheart | Won | |
| 2013 | Goodreads | Goodreads Choice Awards 2013, Best Young Adult Fantasy of 2013 | Steelheart | Nominated | |
| 2014 | World Science Fiction Society | Hugo Award, Best Novel | The Wheel of Time | Nominated | |
| 2014 | DGLA | David Gemmell Awards for Fantasy, Legend Award for Best Novel | A Memory of Light | Nominated | |
| 2014 | Goodreads | Goodreads Choice Awards 2014, Best Fantasy of 2014 | Words of Radiance | Nominated | |
| 2014 | LDStorymakers | Whitney Awards, Best Speculative Fiction Award | Words of Radiance | Won | |
| 2015 | DGLA | David Gemmell Awards for Fantasy, Legend Award for Best Novel | Words of Radiance | Won | |
| 2015 | Goodreads | Goodreads Choice Awards 2015, Best Fantasy of 2015 | Shadows of Self | Nominated | |
| 2015 | Goodreads | Goodreads Choice Awards 2015, Best Young Adult Fantasy of 2015 | Firefight | Nominated | |
| 2016 | World Science Fiction Society | Hugo Award, Best Novella | Perfect State | Nominated | |
| 2016 | Dragon Con | Dragon Awards, Best Young Adult / Middle Grade Novel | Calamity | Nominated | |
| 2017 | DGLA | David Gemmell Awards for Fantasy, Legend Award for Best Fantasy Novel | The Bands of Mourning | Nominated | |
| 2018 | World Science Fiction Society | Hugo Award, Best Series | The Stormlight Archive | Nominated | |
| 2018 | DGLA | David Gemmell Awards for Fantasy, Legend Award for Best Fantasy Novel | Oathbringer | Nominated | |
| 2018 | Dragon Con | Dragon Awards, Best Fantasy Novel (Including Paranormal) | Oathbringer | Won | |
| 2018 | Dragon Con | Dragon Awards, Best Graphic Novel | Brandon Sanderson’s White Sand Volume 1 | Won | |
| 2019 | Israeli Society for Science Fiction and Fantasy | Geffen Award, Best Translated Fantasy Book | The Alloy of Law | Won | |
| 2021 | Dragon Con | Dragon Awards, Best Fantasy Novel (Including Paranormal) | Rhythm of War | Nominated | |
| 2023 | Dragon Con | Dragon Awards, Best Fantasy Novel (Including Paranormal) | Tress of the Emerald Sea | Nominated | |
| 2023 | Utah Valley University | Honorary Doctor of Letters | — | Awarded | |
| 2025 | World Science Fiction Society | Hugo Award, Best Series | The Stormlight Archive | Nominated | |
