= GraphicAudio =

Audiobook publishing imprint

- Parent company: RBMedia
- Founded: October 2004
- Founder: James and Mary Cutting
- Country of origin: United States
- Headquarters location: Rockville, Maryland
- Publication types: Audiobooks
- Official website: www.GraphicAudio.net

GraphicAudio is an audiobook publishing imprint of RBMedia. The GraphicAudio format includes a full cast of actors, narration, sound effects and cinematic music.

== History ==
GraphicAudio began in October 2004 as an independent company by Mary and Jamie Cutting. The two had previously founded the Cutting Corporation which produced dramatised audio tapes of classic literature. Originally called Cutting Audio, its name was changed to GraphicAudio later on. GraphicAudio is located in Rockville, Maryland, having originally been based in Bethesda, and produces everything in its own production studios, duplication and distribution facility. Having originally started with four voice actors, over the course of its history the company's roster of voice actors gradually expanded to over two-hundred worldwide. The company quickly gained a following, particularly among truck drivers. The company's offices were moved to Rockville in 2016, and the company notably struggled to adapt to the changing times, including the obsolescence of CDs and the closure of theatres during the COVID-19 pandemic.

In September 2019, it was announced that the company had launched into a deal with comic book company Vault Comics to adapt some of their material, beginning with Wasted Space.

In March 2020, RBMedia acquired GraphicAudio.

In April 2021, it was announced that the company had entered into a deal with Dark Horse Comics to adapt some of their titles.

In November 2021, it was announced that the company would adapt the Vampire Hunter D novels.

In May 2025, GraphicAudio employees announced they had unionized with the Communications Workers of America to form GraphicAudio United (GAU-CWA). The union was certified by the National Labor Relations Board in August 2025.

In February 2026, GraphicAudio, in conjunction with parent company RB Media, laid off almost half of Graphic Audio's staff. The union argued that it was done as an attempt to break up the union.

GraphicAudio's dramatized adaptation Hellboy And The BPRD: The Goddess Of Manhattan won the 2025 Audie Award for Best Original Work. Written by Christopher Golden and Thomas E. Sniegoski based on Mike Mignola’s universe, the production features a full voice cast, cinematic music, and sound design.

== Facilities ==
The audio production facility has been around since 1971.

== Notable voice actors ==
The most notable voice actors of the company include Duane Beeman, Richard Rohan, Nanette Savard and Terence Aselford, who worked at the company from its earliest days. Voice actress Khaya Fraites joined the company after trying and failing to break into theatre and film due to the COVID-19 pandemic, and wrote an article about her experiences working for the company. Other voice actors noted to have worked at the company include Gabriel Michael, Anthony Palmini, Karenna Foley, Alex Hill-Knight, Marissa Clay, Carolyn Kashner, Melody Muze, Nora Achrati (who has also done some directing work for the company), Kay Eluvian, Holly Adams, Dani Stoller, Julie Ann-Elliott, Torian Brackett, Katie Boothe, Henry W. Kramer, Jon Vertullo, Jenna Sharpe, Debi Tinsley, Stephanie Nemeth-Parker, Scott McCormick, Andy Clemence and Ryan Haugen. Notable guest voice actors have included Lorraine Cink.

== Audiobooks and series ==
GraphicAudio has produced Elizabeth Moon's Vatta's War and The Serrano Legacy series and Elmer Kelton's Texas Ranger Series.

In 2007, DC Comics and GraphicAudio released the audio book versions of Infinite Crisis and 52. In 2008 and 2009, GraphicAudio released a series of Justice League of America audiobooks, followed in May 2009 by an audiobook version of Crisis on Infinite Earths, and that summer by Batman: Dead White and Batman: Inferno. GraphicAudio has since released Countdown, Final Crisis, Batman: No Man's Land, and other titles. The most recent DC release was Its Superman! in March 2014.

In 2012, GraphicAudio confirmed they would also be releasing audiobook versions of Marvel Comics Prose Novels from March 2013 onward. These were Civil War and a Marvel Pocket Spider-Man focused novel entitled Drowned In Thunder. Over 2014, the Marvel Pocket novels The Ultimates: Tomorrow Men and The Ultimates: Against All Enemies were released, followed by Iron Man: Extremis, Astonishing X-Men: Gifted, New Avengers: Breakout, and Guardians of the Galaxy: Rocket Raccoon and Groot Steal The Galaxy! In 2015, The Death of Captain America, Secret Wars, X-Men: Days of Future Past, Avengers: Everyone Wants to Rule the World, and Ant Man: Natural Enemy were released.

GraphicAudio produces USA Today bestselling author William W. Johnstone's Western and Action Adventure series such as Eagles, Blood Bond, The First Mountain Man, The Last Gunfighter, The Mountain Man (Smoke Jensen) and Sidewinders.

Some of the series and titles published are A Town Called Fury, Blood Bond, Blood Valley, Border Empire Trilogy, Dante Valentine, DC Comics, Deathlands, Deathstalker, The Demon Wars Saga, The Destroyer (novel series), Dragon King Trilogy, Doomsday Warrior, Eagles, Earth Blood, Elantris, Executioner, The First Mountain Man, The Forrest Kingdom Saga, The Gospel of Mark, Jackknife, The Last Gunfighter, The Loner, Mack Bolan, Mark Dalton (series), Mistborn, The Mountain Man, The Night Angel Trilogy, North America's Forgotten Past, Outlanders, The Riyria Revelations, Rogue Angel, The Serrano Legacy, Sidewinders, Sons of Texas, Stony Man, The Survivalist, Texas Rangers, Vampire Earth, Vatta's War, Wayne of Gotham and Warbreaker.

== Authors published by GraphicAudio ==
- Jerry Ahern
- Ilona Andrews
- Alex Archer (Harlequin Publishing house name)
- Fred Austin
- James Axler
- Christopher L. Bennett
- Andy Boot
- Peter V. Brett
- Terry Collins
- Ralph Compton
- Ralph Cotton
- Brenton J. Cox
- Greg Cox
- Mark Ellis
- Lawrence Ganem
- Kathleen O'Neal Gear
- W. Michael Gear
- Christopher Golden
- Alan Grant
- Simon R. Green
- Jon Guenther
- Alex Irvine
- Laurence James
- J. A. Johnstone
- William W. Johnstone
- Michael Kasner
- Elmer Kelton
- Steven L. Kent
- E. E. Knight
- Stephen R. Lawhead
- Carol Lay
- Mark the Evangelist
- Sarah J. Maas
- Robert McCammon
- Victor Milán
- Devon Monk
- Elizabeth Moon
- Jim Mullaney
- Warren Murphy
- Will Murray
- Joseph Nassise
- Michael Newton
- Mel Odom
- Dennis O'Neil
- Don Pendleton
- Alan Philipson
- Nick Pollotta
- Cherie Priest
- Christopher J. Priest
- Ron Renauld
- David Robbins
- Chuck Rogers
- Greg Rucka
- Lilith Saintcrow
- R. A. Salvatore
- Brandon Sanderson
- Richard Sapir
- Dan Schmidt
- Mark Schultz
- John Shirley
- Scott Sigler
- Tim Somheil
- Jon Sprunk
- Ryder Stacy
- Roger Stern
- Michael J. Sullivan
- Tim Tresslar
- Edo van Belkom
- Jerry VanCook
- Brent Weeks
- Charles West
- Douglas Wojtowicz
- Marv Wolfman
- John Zakour
- Pierce Brown
- Garth Ennis

== Reception ==
The company's products have received largely positive reception, maintaining a cult following, especially within the United States, and they are considered by BookRiot to be "one of the best ones out there for finding audiobooks with sound effects". For their work on Vagrant Queen, they won the AudioFile magazine's Earphones Award for Exceptional Audio Performance. Their adaptations of Innkeeper Chronicles and Red Rising have been nominated for the Audie Awards. Their adaptation of Blue Moon Rising by Simon R. Green was positively reviewed by the magazine, complimenting their "well-rounded cast" and "engaging narration". The company's adaptations of DC and Marvel were given positive reviews, with Geek Girl Authority, ScreenRant and IGN praising their audio adaptations' fidelity to the original source material. The company's adaptation of A Court of Thorns and Roses gained a following among cosplayers, and NPR 's Robin Whitten noted that she was impressed by their adaptation of Marvel's Civil War. The company's adaptation of Crisis on Infinite Earths was included on the ninth spot on CBR's list of 10 Must-Listen Audio Adaptations of Comics.

However, their adaptation of DC's Countdown received negative reviews, calling the voice acting "hit-or-miss", the dialogue "stereotypical" and the sound effects "[sounding] like afterthoughts". Their adaptation of The Warded Man by Peter V. Brett was also criticised for having sound effects which were "excessively loud". Their adaptation of Corum by Michael Moorcock was also criticised because the voice actor portraying Corum himself possessed an "inconsistent accent". The company's production of Alan Grant's Batman: The Stone King received a negative review, stating that "The production's major flaw is a lack of commitment to either the dramatised or the audiobook form. Uneven dialogue is lumped into excessive stretches of narration, with sound effects that often sound after the narrator's aural cue. Comic book fanatics will enjoy an exciting portrayal of their favourite characters, but listeners who want a story which breaks the bounds of its genre should look elsewhere." The company's adaptation of White Sand also received a mixed review, praising the vocal performances, but deriding the narrative as "lacklustre".
