= W. Michael Gear bibliography =

William Michael Gear, better known as W. Michael Gear, (born May 20, 1955) is an American writer and archaeologist. He is the author of North America's Forgotten Past series, co-written with his wife Kathleen O'Neal Gear. His novels have been published in 29 languages.

Forbidden Borders trilogy

- Requiem for the Conqueror (1991)
- Relic of Empire (1992)
- Countermeasures (1993)

People Books - First North Americans (with Kathleen O'Neal Gear)

- People of the Wolf (1990)
- People of the Fire (1990)
- People of the Sea (1993)
- People of the Lakes (1994)
- People of the Lightning (1995)
- People of the Silence (1996)
- People of the Mist (1997)
- People of the Masks (1998)
- People of the Owl (2003)
- People of the Raven (2004) Spur Award Winner.
- People of the Moon (2005) Spur Award Finalist.
- People of the Nightland (2007)
- People of the Weeping Eye (2008)
- People of the Thunder (2009)
- People of the Longhouse (2010)
- The Dawn Country (2011)
- The Broken Land (2012)
- People of the Black Sun (2012)
- "Copper Falcon" (2014)--short story
- People of the Morning Star (2014)
- "The Dead Man's Doll" (2015)--short story
- People of the Songtrail (2015)
- Sun Born (2016)
- Moon Hunt (2017) This novel was a Spur Award finalist.
- Star Path (2019)
- People of the Canyons (2020)
- People of Cahokia: Lightning Shell (2022)

German only

- Das Ende Aller Tage, Bastei Lübbe #16290 2007, Translator Rainer Schumacher, ISBN 978-3-404-15748-8 (Orig. Comes a Green Sky)
- Der Eden Effekt, Bastei Lübbe #16608 2012, Translator Karin Meddekis, ISBN 978-3-404-16608-4 (Orig. The carbon cauldron)
- Das letzte Gebet, Bastei Lübbe #15748 2007, Translator Rainer Schumacher, ISBN 978-3-404-15748-8 (Orig. To cast a pearl)

Spider Trilogy

- The Warriors of Spider (1988)
- The Way of Spider (1988)
- The Web of Spider (1989)

The Richard Hamilton Duology

- Morning River (1996)
- Coyote Summer (1997)

Anasazi Mysteries (with Kathleen O'Neal Gear)

- The Visitant (1999)
- The Summoning God (2000)
- Bone Walker (2001)

Other novels

- The Big Horn Legacy (1988)
- Long Ride Home (1988)
- The Artifact (1990)
- Starstrike (1990)
- Dark Inheritance (2001) (with Kathleen O'Neal Gear)
- Raising Abel (2002) (with Kathleen O'Neal Gear)
- The Athena Factor (2005)
- The Betrayal: The Lost Life of Jesus (2008) (with Kathleen O'Neal Gear)
- Children of the Dawnland (2009) (with Kathleen O'Neal Gear)
- This Scorched Earth (2018) (as William Gear) 2019 Spur Award finalist.
- The Foundation (2021)
- Fracture Event (2021)
- Athena Unleashed (2024)
- Genesis Athena (2024)
- Athena's Wrath (2024)

The Battle for America series

- Coming of the Storm (2010)
- Fire the Sky (2010)
- A Searing Wind (2011)

Donovan Series

- Outpost (2018)
- Abandoned (2018)
- Pariah (2019)
- Unreconciled (2020)
- Adrift (2021)
- Reckoning (2022)

The Wyoming Chronicles

- Dissolution (2021)
- Fourth Quadrant (2022)
- After The Eagle Has Fallen (2023)

Team Psi Series

- The Alpha Enigma (2020)
- Implacable Alpha (2022)

Flight of the Hawk trilogy

- The River (2018)
- The Plains (2019)

Saga of the Mountain Sage quartet

- The Morning River, Wolfpack Publishing, 2023
- The White Mist Dog, Wolfpack Publishing, 2023
- A Panther's Scream, Wolfpack Publishing, 2023
- Coyote Summer, Wolfpack Publishing, 2023

== Updated reprints ==
The Anasazi Mysteries

- The Visitant (Anasazi Mysteries, Part 1), Wolfpack Publishing, 2023
- Where the Basilisk Dreams, (Anasazi Mysteries, Part 2), Wolfpack Publishing, 2023
- The Summoning God ((Anasazi Mysteries, Part 3), Wolfpack Publishing, 2023
- The Two Hearted (Anasazi Mysteries, Part 4), Wolfpack Publishing, 2023
- Bone Walker (Anasazi Mysteries, Part 5), Wolfpack Publishing, 2023
- Hunting Shadows (Anasazi Mysteries, Part 6), Wolfpack Publishing, 2023

The Peacemaker's Tale

- People of the Longhouse, Part 1 of the Peacemaker's Tale, Wolfpack Publishing, 2024.
- Shadowed Forest, Part 2 of the Peacemaker's Tale, Wolfpack Publishing, 2024
- The Dawn Country, Part 3 of the Peacemaker's Tale, Wolfpack Publishing, 2024
- The Dusk Country, Part 4 of the Peacemaker's Tale, Wolfpack Publishing, 2024
- The Broken Land, Part 5 of the Peacemaker's Tale, Wolfpack Publishing, 2024
- Blood Lightning, Part 6 Of the Peacemaker's Tale, Wolfpack Publishing, 2024
- People of the Black Sun, Part 7 of the Peacemaker's Tale, Wolfpack Publishing, 2024
- Eclipse Dancer, Part 8 of the Peacemaker's Tale, Wolfpack Publishing, 2024

Children's books

- Children of the Dawnland, Part 1, 2023
- Children of the Dawnland, Part 2, 2024
- Ridin' With the Pack, anthology of western short stories, "Bad Choices," by W. Michael Gear, Wolfpack Publishing, 2023.
- Switching Gears, anthology of western short fiction, by W. Michael Gear and Kathleen O'Neal Gear, Wolfpack Publishing, Oct. 2024.

Selected non-fiction

- Gene-Edited Bison: A Barnyard Revolution or a Looming Disaster? in Bison Review Magazine, Winter, 2023.
- Willing Suspension of Disbelief: The Contract and Why Research Matters, published in the Colorado Authors Hall of Fame Attitudes at Altitude, April, 2023.
- Does Social Media Sell Books? The Case of the Viral Tweet, in Roundup Magazine, April, 2023.
- When Buffalo Cry, Buffalo Tales and Trails, https://buffalotalesandtrails.com/author/kogwmgbuffalotalesandtrails-com/ March, 2023.
- The New Bison Genome...and another DNA test: Our opinion, Bison Review Magazine, Winter, 2022.
- PLC at Work and Your Small School, by Breez Longwell Daniels. Foreword by W. Michael Gear and Kathleen O'Neal Gear, Solution Tree Press, Bloomington, Indiana, 2020.
- When Buffalo Cry, Roundup Magazine, February, 2020
- Meatless Meat. What's All the Fuss About? Bison Review, Winter, 2020
- The Power of an Illusion, Bison Review, Summer, 2019
- When Buffalo Cry, Bison Review, Winter, 2017.
- More on the Higgs Bison, Bison Review, Fall, 2016.
- Chunkey: America's Ancient Game, Cobblestone, October, 2015.
- Morning Star and the Giants, Cobblestone, October, 2015.
- Are Bison Microsatellite DNA Tests Accurate? Bison Review, Winter, 2015.
- Cattle Genes in Bison: Modern or Ancient? Bison Review, Winter, 2015.
- The Dead Man's Doll, Tor Books, April, 2015.
- Vikings in North America, Tor Books, March, 2015.
- A Prehistoric Bison Bone Sculpture. Bison Review, Summer, 2015.
- Viking Warrior Women: Did 'Shieldmaidens' like Lagertha Really Exist? Tor/Forge blog, May, 2015. (Tor.com)
- Wild Bison: The Search for a Definition of 'Wild' Behavior. Bison Review, Spring, 2014.
- Genetically Modified Bison? Let's Not Find out if there is a Health Risk. Say NO to GMO. Bison Review, Fall, 2013.
- Chimps and Bison: The ESA Effect. Bison Review, Fall, 2013.
- The Healing Powers of Buffalo in Native America. Bison Review, Spring, 2013.
- Public Comments Letter from WBA to USFWS on Woods Bison Designation. Bison Review, Spring, 2013.
- Western Bison Association—Issues Paper: Conservation Herds vs. Commercial Herds. The Upcoming COSEWIC Report in Canada. Bison Review, Spring, 2013.
- Petition to Remove Wood Bison from Administration Under the Provisions of the Endangered Species Act. Bison Review, Winter, 2012.
- Hybrids and the Endangered Species Act, Bison Review, Winter, 2012.
- Cattle Genes in Bison: The Perspectives of the WBA. Bison Review, Fall, 2012.
- The Effects of Cattle DNA in Bison: A New Study. Bison Review, Fall, 2012.
- The Global Economic Crises and Food Production: What's in Store? Bison Review, Fall, 2012.
- Response to Canadian Perspectives. Bison Review, Fall, 2012.
- New change to the NBA Code of Ethics—Our opinion, Bison Review, May, 2012.
- Terminology: Bison bison or Bos bison. What does it mean for us? Bison Review, May, 2012.
- Ranchers Efforts to Protect Endangered Species Foiled by Conservation Groups. Bison Review, May, 2012.
- Historical Uses of Bison. Bison Review, May, 2012.
- Hybrids and the Endangered Species Act. Bison Review, Winter, 2012.
- Western Bison Association's Petition to Remove Wood Bison from Administration Under the Endangered Species Act. Bison Review, Winter, 2012.
- 2011 WBA Conference Overview. Bison Review, Winter, 2012.
- Gene Patents: Why the Bison Industry Needs a Plan for the Bison Genome. Bison Review, Fall, 2011.
- Paleobiology of Bison, Dakota Territory Buffalo Association Newsletter, Summer, 2011.
- The Pure Bison Debate, Dakota Territory Buffalo Association Newsletter, Summer, 2011.
- Western Bison Association Response to Conservation Committee on Proposed Conservation Guidelines for Herd Managers. Bison Review, May, 2011.
- The Buffalo Primer: An Introduction to the Art and Science of Owning Bison. Part 7. Bison Review, May, 2011.
- Principles of Evolutionary Biology – and What They Mean for the Purity Issue in Bison, Dakota Territory Buffalo Association Newsletter, Summer, 2011.
- Summary of 12th Annual Stampede, Bison Review, January, 2011.
- Possible Impacts of 'Pure Bison' Debate, Bison Review, January, 2011.
- Pure Bison—WBA Management Recommendations, Bison Review, January 2011.
- Western Bison Association Response to Conservation Committee on Proposed Conservation Guidelines for Herd Managers. Bison Review, May, 2011.
- The Buffalo Primer: An Introduction to the Art and Science of Owning Bison. Part 6. Bison Review, January, 2011.
- Basic Principles of Evolutionary Biology – and What they Mean for the Purity Issue. Bison Review, Jan. 2011.
- Response to James Derr, Bison Review, January, 2011.
- Lessons from Ancient Egypt. Bison World Magazine, June, 2010.
- One Bison Skull Helps Rewrite Bison History. The Bison Review, Summer, 2010.
- Lessons from Ancient Egypt. Bison Review, January 2010.
- The Buffalo Primer: An Introduction to the Art and Science of Owning Bison. Part 5. Nutrition. Bison Review, January, 2010.
- The Buffalo Primer: An Introduction to the Art and Science of Owning Bison. Part 4.Bison Review, Fall, 2009.
- The Buffalo Primer: An Introduction to the Art and Science of Owning Buffalo. Part 3: Buying Buffalo. Bison Review, May, 2009.
- How do the Judges Do it? Bison Review, May, 2009.
- The Buffalo Primer: An Introduction to the Art and Science of Owning Buffalo. Part 2. Bison Review, Fall, 2008.
- Do we really want Bison to be Amenable? Dakota Territory Buffalo Association Newsletter, Fall, 2008.
- Should Bison be an Amenable Species? The Bison Rancher, Fall, 2008.
- The Buffalo Primer: An Introduction to the Art and Science of Owning Buffalo. Part 1.Bison Review, Summer, 2008.
- The Horsemen of the Apocalypse: Long Version, Bison Review, Summer, 2008.
- Do We Really Want Bison to be an Amenable Species? Bison Review, Summer, 2008.
- The Horsemen of the Apocalypse, Bison World Magazine, Spring, 2008.
- The Drought, Global Warming, and Our Own Backyards, Western Bison Record, March, 2007.
- Medicinal Usages of Plants by Buffalo. Western Bison Record, November, 2006.
- Prehistoric Sexual Healing Rituals, Romantic Times magazine, May, 2005.
- The Oregon Trail: The Beginning of the End for the Buffalo, Western Bison Record, June, 2005.
- Slipper: The Saga of a Buffalo Bottle-Baby. Western Bison Record, March, 2004.
- Tripping through the Mine Field: Writing Fiction about Archaeology, The Archaeological Record, November, 2003.
- From Cowboy to Buffalero: Wyoming Buffalo Ranchers Talk About the Industry, Western Farm, Ranch, and Dairy Magazine, September, 2003.
- Thirty-three Books, Co-Authors and Still Lovers? Romantic Times Magazine, Aug. 2001.
- Bone Walker and The Anasazi Mystery Series. Mystery Readers Journal, 2001.
