= Sanjulián =

Spanish painter (1941–2026)

Manuel Pérez Clemente (24 June 1941 – 14 October 2026), better known as Sanjulián, was a Spanish painter, most notable for his comics, magazine and novel covers.

== Life and career ==
Sanjulián was born in Barcelona on 24 June 1941, and studied at Belles Arts of Barcelona. He began working for Selecciones Ilustradas circa 1962, and Warren Publishing in 1970. Sanjulián had multiple shows at The Society of Illustrators in New York City, and was a guest at the 2008 Emerald City ComiCon.

Sanjulián died on 14 October 2026, at the age of 85.

== Work ==
=== Magazine and comic covers ===
- Atomika – Sketchbook 2009
- 1984
- Creepy (1964) – #42, 46, 47, 48, 50, 51, 61, 79
  - Creepy (2009) – #5
- Eerie – #40, 41, 46, 48, 50–54, 58, 62, 63, 66, 67, 69, 70–72, 76, 102, 133, 135
- Gespenster Geschichten – #1168
- Heavy Metal – #71, Special 1984, Special Vol.12
- Realms of Fantasy – October 1996, June 1997
- Vampirella – #12–16, 23, 36–38, 44, 45, 50, 51, 55, 81, 91, 99, 100, 102, 107, 109
  - Vampirella: Crimson Chronicles – #1
- Warren Presents – #1, 6, 13

=== Novel covers ===
- The Artificial Man (1967)
- Bloodstalk (1975)
- Deadwalk (1976)
- Conan and the Sorcerer (1978 & 1984)
  - The Blade of Conan (1979)
  - The Treasure of Tranicos (1980)
  - Conan the Mercenary (1981)
  - The Flame Knife (1981)
- Zarsthor's Bane (1978)
- The Lost Continent (1979)
- The Gods of Bal-Sagoth (1979)
- Slaves of Sleep (1979)
- Three-Bladed Doom (1979)
- Tigers of the Sea (1979)
- Worms of the Earth (1979)
- Anackire (1983)
- The Year's Best Fantasy Stories: 9 (1983)
- The Name of the Rose (1984)
- Dinosaur Tales (1984)
- The Vizier's Second Daughter (1985)
- The Dragon Waiting (1985)
- The Green Pearl (1986 & 1987)
  - Madouc (1990)
- Janissaries III: Storms of Victory (1987 & 1988)
- Fletch, Too (1988)
- The Storm Lord (1988)
- The White Serpent (1988)
- The Warriors of Spider (1988)
  - The Way of Spider (1989)
  - The Web of Spider (1989)
- Crusader's Torch (1989)
  - A Candle for D'Artagnan (1989)
- The Lions of Tsavo (1989)
- The Artifact (1990)
- An Abyss of Light (1990)
  - Treasure of Light (1990)
  - Redemption of Light (1991)
- The Empire of Fear (1990)
- Scavenger Hunt (1990)
- Starstrike (1990)
- Rally Cry! (1990)
  - Terrible Swift Sword (1998)
- The Unicorn Solution (1991)
- Fire Crossing (1991)
- Requiem for the Conqueror (1991)
  - Relic of Empire (1992)
- Mistworld (1992)
  - Ghostworld (1993)
  - Hellworld (1993)
- The Last Dancer (1993)
- Dragon Reforged (1995)
  - Dragons Can Only Rust (1995)
- The Great and Secret Show (1995)
- Her Majesty's Wizard (1995)
- Devil's Tower (1996)
- Palace (1996)
  - The Eyes of God (1998)
- Tarzan Triumphant/Tarzan and the City of Gold (1997)
- See You Later (1998)
- Imperium Without End (1999)
  - Imperium Afire (2000)
- Devlin's Luck (2002)
  - Devlin's Honor (2003)
  - Devlin's Justice (2004)

=== Other work ===
- Sanjulian: Master Visionary (2001) ISBN 0-86562-039-3
- Sword's Edge: Paintings Inspired by the Works of Robert E. Howard (2010) ISBN 978-1-59929-053-9
- Conan: Adventures in an Age Undreamed Of (2016, Modiphius Entertainment, inner pages illustrations by Sanjulián, among others)
- Dungeon Crawl Classics 7th printing Goodman Games, special edition cover.
- Vandroid (comic book) poster art

== Sources ==
- Sanjulian at the Internet Speculative Fiction Database
- Manuel Perez Clemente Sanjulian at the Internet Speculative Fiction Database
- Sanjulian at the Comic Book Database
- Sanjulian at Amazon.com
