= Joseph Nassise =

American novelist

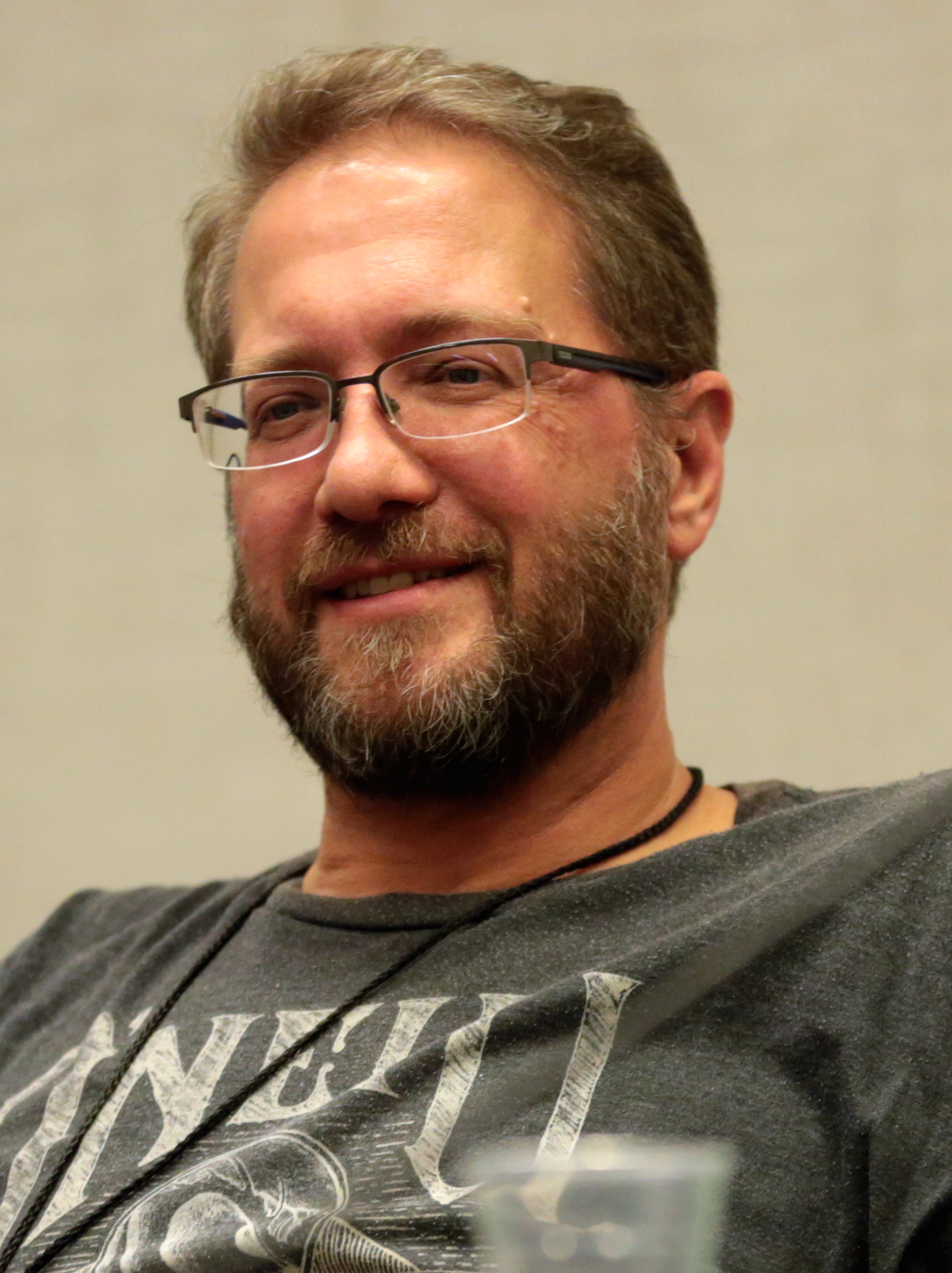
- Nassise at Phoenix Comicon in 2017
- Born: 1968 (age 57–58); Easton, Massachusetts, U.S.
- Occupation: Writer
- Children: 4
- Writing career
- Genre: Urban fantasy
- Website: josephnassise.com

Joseph Nassise (born 1968) is a New York Times and USA Today bestselling American urban fantasy writer and the author of more than sixty novels. His debut novel, Riverwatch, was nominated for both the Bram Stoker Award and the International Horror Guild Award. He is the author of the internationally bestselling Templar Chronicles series, the Jeremiah Hunt Chronicle, the Great Undead War series, as well as several books for Gold Eagle's Rogue Angel line. His work has been translated into German, Russian, Polish Portuguese, Spanish, and Italian. Nassise served as the president of the Horror Writers Association from 2002 to 2005 and a Trustee of the same from 2008 to 2010.

Nassise was born and raised in Easton, Massachusetts. He lives with his wife and four children in Arizona.

== Bibliography ==
=== Novels ===
- Riverwatch (Pocket Books, 2003) Bram Stoker Award and International Horror Guild Award nominee
- The Carrion King (Harbinger Books, 2025)
- Reckoning (Harbinger Books, 2026)

==== Series ====
- The Templar Chronicles
  - Novels
    - Heretic (Pocket Books, 2005), later retitled as The Heretic
    - A Scream of Angels (Harbinger Books, 2010), first published in German translation as Der Engel (Droemer Knaur, 2007)
    - A Tear in the Sky (Harbinger Books, 2010), first published in German translation as Die Schatten (Droemer Knaur, 2008)
    - Infernal Games (Harbinger Books, 2014)
    - Judgment Day (Harbinger Books, 2014)
    - Fall of Night (Harbinger Books, 2017)
    - Darkness Reigns (Harbinger Books, 2018)
    - Nephilim Rising (Harbinger Books, 2019)
    - Angel's Regret (Harbinger Books, 2026)
  - Templar Chronicles Mission novellas
    - Shades of Blood and Darkness (Harbinger Books, 2014), set before The Heretic, previously published in slightly different form as That Cleansing Fire
    - The Hungry Dark (Harbinger Books, 2014), set between The Heretic and A Scream of Angels, also contained in SNAFU: Heroes: An Anthology of Military Horror
    - Tooth and Claw (Harbinger Books, 2018)
    - Flesh and Bone (Harbinger Books, 2018)
    - Babylon Dreams (Harbinger Books, 2026)
    - Oni of Chinatown (Harbinger Books, 2026)
- The Jeremiah Hunt Chronicle
  - Eyes to See (Tor Books, 2011), first published in German translation as Der Schattenseher (PAN, 2009)
  - King of the Dead (Tor Books, 2012)
  - Watcher of the Dark (Tor Books, 2013)
- The Great Undead War
  - By the Blood of Heroes (HarperVoyager, 2012)
  - On Her Majesty's Behalf (HarperVoyager, 2014)
  - The Sharp End (Harbinger Books, 2014), short story set before By the Blood of Heroes
  - Operation Shambling Tide (Harbinger Books, 2026)
- The Aspect Cycle (with Steven Savile using the pen name Matthew Caine)
  - Ghosts of the Conquered (2015)
- Rogue Angel
  - The Spirit Banner (Gold Eagle/Worldwide Library, 2010)
  - The Dragon's Mark (Gold Eagle/Worldwide Library, 2010)
  - Tear of the Gods (Gold Eagle/Worldwide Library, 2011)
  - Cradle of Solitude (Gold Eagle/Worldwide Library, 2012)
  - Library of Gold (Gold Eagle/Worldwide Library, 2012)
  - Staff of Judea (Gold Eagle/Worldwide Library, 2013)
  - The Vanishing Tribe (Gold Eagle/Worldwide Library, 2013)
  - Treasure of Lima (Gold Eagle/Worldwide Library, 2014)
  - Bathed in Blood (Gold Eagle/Worldwide Library, 2015)
  - Beneath Still Waters (Gold Eagle/Worldwide Library, 2015)
- HELLstalkers
  - The Cerberus Protocol (Harbinger Books, 2002) (with Jon F. Merz)
  - Cold Day in Hell (Harbinger Books, 2020)
  - Dark Night in Caracas (Harbinger Books, June 2024)

=== Novellas and collections ===
- More Than Life Itself (Telos Publishing, 2006), novella also contained in Shades of Reality
- Spectres and Darkness (Medium Rare Books, 2002), collection containing eleven pieces of short fiction: five stories by Nassise and six by Drew Williams
- Shades of Reality: Tales of Horror and Dark Fantasy (Harbinger Books, 2011), collection of twelve pieces of short fiction including More Than Life Itself

=== Comics ===
- Heretic (Markosia Comics, United Kingdom, 2006) - 6 issue mini-series,
- Candice Crowe (with Halston Weick) (Arcana Studios, 2011) - Original Graphic Novel

=== Edited anthologies ===
- Brimstone Dreams (Harbinger Books, 2011)
- Midian Unmade: Tales of Clive Barker's Nightbreed (Tor Books, 2015) (with Del Howison)
- Urban Allies (HarperVoyager, 2016)
- Urban Enemies (Gallery, 2017)

=== Role-playing game supplements ===
- The Sentinel's Bible (Creative Illusions, 2003) - players sourcebook for The Seventh Seal role-playing game

== Interviews ==
- Voices of Horror #10: An Interview with Joseph Nassise

== See also ==
- List of horror fiction authors
