= People of Earth (disambiguation) =

People of Earth is a 2016 American comedy television series.

People of Earth may also refer to:

- "People of Earth", a reference to humans
- People of Earth, a 2007 album by Doctor Steel
- People of Earth, an episode of Star Trek: Discovery

== See also ==
- People of the Earth, a 1992 novel by W. Michael Gear and Kathleen O'Neal Gear in the First North Americans series.
- Citizens of Earth, a 2015 video game
