= Syvertsen =

Syvertsen is a surname. Notable people with the surname include:

- Frode Syvertsen (born 1963), Norwegian speed skater
- Håvard Syvertsen (born 1962), Norwegian novelist and short story writer
- Olaf Syvertsen (1884–1964), Norwegian gymnast
- Ryder Syvertsen (1941–2015), American author
- Tuva Syvertsen (born 1983), Norwegian musician
