= Shane Black's unrealized projects =

Projects he almost made

During his extensive career, American filmmaker Shane Black has worked on several projects which never progressed beyond the pre-production stage under his direction. Some of these projects fell in development hell, were officially canceled, were in development limbo or would see life under a different production team.

== 1980s ==
=== Shadow Company ===
Written in 1984, Shadow Company was Black's first script, and got him his first agent. The project was a supernatural thriller set during the Vietnam War that he once described as a cross between Platoon and The Exorcist. It was subsequently optioned by Universal Pictures and, following the success of Lethal Weapon, John Carpenter and Walter Hill came on as director and executive producer, respectively. A later draft, dated 1988, was co-written with Fred Dekker.

=== Sgt. Rock ===
In 1987, Arnold Schwarzenegger was attached to play the DC Comics character Sgt. Rock in a film written by Black, directed by John McTiernan, and produced by Joel Silver. Taking inspiration from the war comedy Imitation General, Black's version would have featured an English cook pretending to be a World War II general who is protected by Schwarzenegger's Sgt. Rock, an Austrian whose family were killed by Nazis. Following the success of A Fish Called Wanda, star John Cleese was Schwarzenegger and McTiernan's choice to portray the English cook. The actor turned them down and McTiernan blamed this for the project falling apart, as the idea of Cleese and Schwarzenegger together had become so integral to their vision. David Peoples and Steven E. de Souza also worked on the script during the 1980s.

== 1990s ==
=== Wild Wild West ===
In 1992, it was reported in Variety that Warner Bros. was planning a theatrical version of the classic TV series The Wild Wild West written by Black, directed by Richard Donner and starring Mel Gibson in the lead role of James West. Donner and Gibson instead opted on a theatrical version of Maverick in 1994. Wild Wild West continued in the development stage until the late 1990s when Black's material was discarded in favor of subsequent new drafts written by Steve Wilson, Brent Maddock, and Jeffrey Price and Peter S. Seaman.

=== Fear Itself TV series ===
In 1995, Variety indicated that Black was involved as the writer of a planned HBO horror anthology series centering on phobias, entitled Fear Itself. Renny Harlin—who directed Black's script of The Long Kiss Goodnight—was producing the project with Michael De Luca.

== 2000s ==
=== Lethal Weapon 5 ===
On August 6, 2008, it was reported that Black had secretly written a spec script for a fifth Lethal Weapon film, and contacted franchise producer Joel Silver to explain that he wanted to continue the story. At this time, it was said that both Mel Gibson and Danny Glover would return to reprise their roles as Martin Riggs and Roger Murtaugh, respectively, despite no deals being signed officially. Black later confirmed that he co-wrote a 63-page outline with his partner Chuck Mondry. Their iteration of a fifth installment would have seen Riggs and Murtaugh on one last case, tracking private contractors from Afghanistan who are setting up shop during "the worst blizzard in east coast history." Black estimated the film's budget as $150 million.

=== Cold Warrior ===
On September 22, 2008, Variety reported that Black would direct Cold Warrior, Chuck Mondry's screenplay about a spy from the Cold War era who comes out of retirement to team with a younger agent from the new school to confront a domestic terrorism threat orchestrated by Russia. Michelle Manning, David Greenblatt, and Anthony Bagarozzi were attached to produce the film, with Universal Pictures distributing. On January 27, 2010, Mel Gibson was in talks to star in the film. On September 5, 2018, Netflix acquired the film from Universal.

== 2010s ==
=== Doc Savage ===
In 2010, Black was set to direct a feature film adaptation of Doc Savage, with Anthony Bagarozzi and Charles Mondry cowriting with Black, Neal H. Moritz is producing the project with Ori Marmur through his Original Film banner in collaboration with Michael Uslan, and Columbia Pictures would handle film distribution, and on May 30, 2016, Dwayne Johnson was attached to star in & produce the film through his Seven Bucks Productions.

=== Death Note ===
On January 13, 2011, Black was set to direct the American feature film adaptation of Tsugumi Ohba and Takeshi Obata's manga Death Note, with Anthony Bagarozzi and Charles Mondry attached to write the screenplay, Dan Lin, Roy Lee, Doug Davison and Brian Witten will produce the film for Warner Bros. handling film distribution, which was released with Adam Wingard directing for Netflix

=== The Destroyer ===
On August 21, 2014, Black was set to direct the feature film adaptation of The Destroyer book series, with Jim Uhls and Jim Mullaney attached to write the screenplay, Charles Roven, Steven Chasman, and Andy Horwitz will produce the film for Sony Pictures Entertainment handling distribution. On December 8, 2022, Sony Pictures Television announced a television series adaptation was in development with Gordon Smith writing and producing the project replacing Black's feature film.

=== Untitled time travel horror film ===
On June 9, 2016, while promoting The Nice Guys in an interview for The Playlist, Black mentioned a horror film script he had written about time travel.

=== The Avengers reboot TV series ===
In January 2018, Black and Fred Dekker were co-writing a reboot of the 1960s British espionage series The Avengers for Warner Bros. Television. Then on January 18, 2024, StudioCanal was set to develop a reboot without Black, Dekker, and WB Television.

== 2020s ==
=== Crag Banyon P.I. TV series ===
In 2020, Fox was announced to be developing Crag Banyon P.I., an animated comedy series based on the Crag Banyon Mysteries books by Jim Mullaney, with he and Black hired to co-write and executive produce. The project was also executive produced by David Silverman, who was to direct, Stampede Ventures' Greg Silverman and Paul Shapiro, Greenlit's David Greenblatt, and Vinson Films' Tripp Vinson. Bento Box was attached as the animation company.

=== Bannerman TV series ===
In 2023, AMC Networks announced it had acquired the rights to John Maxim's Bannerman book series to develop for TV with Black, Greg Nicotero, Brian Witten and Jeffrey Maxim executive producing. By 2026, it was confirmed that Black also intended to direct.

=== The Executioner ===
In 2026, Sony Pictures picked up a creative package that saw Black reteaming with longtime producer-collaborator Joel Silver on a new adaptation of Don Pendleton's The Executioner books. The pulp series follows the fictional Mack Bolan, a former sniper turned lone-wolf who continually finds himself battling new antagonists such as organized crime, Soviet agents, terrorist groups and cybercriminals. Black was to write—with an eye to direct—the script alongside Anthony Bagarozzi and Chuck Mondry. No casting details were reported.

== Offers ==
=== The Green Hornet ===
On January 18, 2011, Evan Goldberg revealed that Black was considered to direct the feature film adaptation of The Green Hornet, before Michel Gondry was attached to direct.

=== Gambit ===
On November 12, 2015, Black was offered to direct the X-Men spinoff film Gambit after Rupert Wyatt dropped out, but Doug Liman was hired instead.

=== Hobbs & Shaw ===
On October 5, 2017, Black was offered to direct the Fast & Furious spinoff film Hobbs & Shaw, before David Leitch was attached to direct.
