= People of the River =

People of the River may refer to:

- People of the River, 1992 historical novel in the series North America's Forgotten Past by W. Michael Gear and Kathleen O'Neal Gear
- People of the River (book), 2020 Australian history book by Grace Karskens
