= Rogue Angel =

Series of paperback novels

Rogue Angel is a series of paperback novels produced bi-monthly since July 2006 by Harlequin Enterprises, published under a succession of imprints and written under the house name of "Alex Archer". Actual authors are credited with small notes inside the books but not on the front covers or spines. Each novel relates to history or mythology with a heavy fantasy slant, and the main character is Annja Creed.

== Background ==
Books in the series can be read individually, although when read in order, character development and sub-plots may be followed.

Typically, each volume is named after a historical or mythological artefact, around which the plot revolves. The plot structure tends to follow a pattern where the heroine discovers the item in question. The villain or another party then steals the item or abducts the heroine, motivated by their believing the item holds special power or significance. In the course of the story, the heroine discovers more about a historical period and the people who lived in it.

=== Series history ===
The series was first envisioned by Randall Toye, a Harlequin executive who fell in love with the history concerning Joan of Arc and wanted to develop the idea of a present-day Joan. Veteran action-adventure editors Feroze Mohammed and Nicole Brebner teamed up with Mel Odom to flesh out their series.

The first eight novels were written by Mel Odom and Victor Milán. New writers joining the series starting with book nine include Jon Merz, Michele Hauf, Jean Rabe, and Joseph Nassise.

=== Influences ===
Rogue Angel's premise and execution display similarities with earlier franchises such as the Witchblade comic book (published since 1995) and TV series (2001-02), Tomb Raider (1996-present), and Outlanders (1997–present).

== Characters ==
=== Annja Creed ===
Annja Creed is a world-traveling archaeologist with a penchant for arcane history and adventure. Heir to Joan of Arc's mystic sword and an ambiguous heroic destiny, she frequently finds herself exposed to both. She is portrayed as beautiful and intelligent.

Growing up in an orphanage, Annja, partly due to her lack of knowledge of her own origins, developed a love of history, as well as an interest in martial arts. She then earned a college scholarship and achieved a Masters in Archeology, concentrating on medieval and renaissance time periods, while also acquiring specialized knowledge in anthropology and art. She has written several scholarly as well as popular-scientific articles and books.

Not long after graduating, Annja was offered a job working as a host on Chasing History’s Monsters, a syndicated television show investigating all manner of cryptids drawn from pop culture, folklore, and mythology, and occasionally less far-fetched types of "monsters" such as serial killers. She tries to bring a certain amount of factual material to the episodes she hosts, but the show's producer insists on a more sensationalist and speculative slant. This regularly frustrates her, but the salary and expense account involved allow her to travel freely, and she often puts her status as a minor celebrity to good use.

She resides in a loft in Brooklyn, New York.

==== The Sword ====
When Joan of Arc was burned at the stake for heresy, her sword was shattered by an English soldier, and the fragments were widely dispersed. However, Roux and Garin, two of the knights in her personal retinue, were cursed with immortality in order to be able to eventually track down and reassemble the artifact.

Annja was present when this came to pass, and at her touch, the blade magically reformed, making her its new bearer. It cannot be taken from her against her will, and she has the power to remove it to and retrieve it from a supernatural location referred to as "the Otherwhere". This process works regardless of the Sword's current location, giving her the ability to, for example, use the weapon as a projectile and then immediately recall it to her hand.

Moreover, it also enhances her general constitution and helps her recover from injuries.

=== Recurring ===
==== Roux ====
Roux is apparently in his sixties, but has actually been alive for more than five hundred years. The precise extent of his immortality has not been revealed, though one of the later books (River of Nightmares) shows that it is not merely longevity but imbues him with an ability to recover from wounds that outstrip even Annja's.

He and Annja are in a mentor-protege relationship, however reluctant and long-distance. At the same time, he has his own agenda, such as tracking down a variety of other reportedly magical items for reasons ranging from simple personal ambition to the genuine desire to keep them out of hands that would use them for harm, and he is not above manipulating others, including Annja, to accomplish this.

He resides in a castle-like mansion outside of Paris, France.

==== Garin ====
Garin Braden was Roux's apprentice in Joan's day. Physically, he falls squarely into the "tall, dark, and handsome" category, and he has grown considerably wealthy and powerful, with a wide range of employees and resources at his beck and call. He is arrogant and ruthless, but also experiences and acts on the occasional selfless impulse.

His relationships with both Roux and Annja are complicated. He was initially afraid that the reforming of the Sword would put an end to his longevity and consequently made several attempts to destroy or at least separate Annja and the artifact. This concern lessens over time, though, and he increasingly develops fondness of and respect for her. His feelings towards Roux appear to be a mix of deep-rooted attachment and resentment.

His main residence is in Germany, but his lifestyle is even more cosmopolitan than Annja's.

==== Doug Morrell ====
Doug Morrell produces Chasing History's Monsters and is a stereotypical media personality - young, supremely self-involved, and with a staggering disregard for facts, especially when they threaten to get in the way of ratings. His relationship with Annja is sufficiently solid to survive the frequent disagreements this causes, though.

== Series listing ==
Renaissance (2008) collects books 1,2,3
Babel Codex (September 2013) (free novella, written by Mel Odom)

Series no.	Title	Author(s)	Date Released
01	Destiny	Mel Odom	July 2006
02	Solomon's Jar	Victor Milán	September 2006
03	The Spider Stone	Mel Odom	November 2006
04	The Chosen	Victor Milán	January 2007
05	Forbidden City	Mel Odom	March 2007
06	The Lost Scrolls	Victor Milán	May 2007
07	God of Thunder	Mel Odom	July 2007
08	Secret of the Slaves	Victor Milán	September 2007
09	Warrior Spirit	Jon F. Merz	November 2007
10	Serpent's Kiss	Mel Odom	January 2008
11	Provenance	Victor Milán	March 2008
12	The Soul Stealer	Jon F. Merz	May 2008
13	Gabriel's Horn	Mel Odom	July 2008
14	The Golden Elephant	Victor Milán	September 2008
15	Swordsman's Legacy	Michele Hauf	November 2008
16	Polar Quest	Jon F. Merz	January 2009
17	Eternal Journey	Jean Rabe	March 2009
18	Sacrifice	Jon F. Merz	May 2009
19	Seeker's Curse	Victor Milán	July 2009
20	Footprints	Jon F. Merz	September 2009
21	Paradox	Victor Milán	November 2009
22	The Spirit Banner	Joseph Nassise	January 2010
23	Sacred Ground	Jon F. Merz	March 2010
24	The Bone Conjurer	Michele Hauf	May 2010
25	Tribal Ways	Victor Milán	July 2010
26	The Dragon's Mark	Joseph Nassise	September 2010
27	Phantom Prospect	Jon F. Merz	November 2010
28	Restless Soul	Jean Rabe	January 2011
29	False Horizon	Jon F. Merz	March 2011
30	The Other Crowd	Michele Hauf	May 2011
31	Tear of the Gods	Joseph Nassise	July 2011
32	The Oracle's Message	Jon F. Merz	September 2011
33	Cradle of Solitude	Joseph Nassise	November 2011
34	Labyrinth	Jon F. Merz	January 2012
35	Fury's Goddess	Jon F. Merz	March 2012
36	Magic Lantern	Mel Odom	May 2012
37	Library of Gold	Joseph Nassise	July 2012
38	The Matador's Crown	Michele Hauf	September 2012
39	City of Swords	Jean Rabe	November 2012
40	The Third Caliph	Mel Odom	January 2013
41	The Staff of Judea	Joseph Nassise	March 2013
42	The Vanishing Tribe	Joseph Nassise	May 2013
43	Clockwork Doomsday	Mel Odom	July 2013
44	Blood Cursed	Michele Hauf	September 2013
45	Sunken Pyramid	Jean Rabe	November 2013
46	Treasure of Lima	Joseph Nassise	January 2014
47	River of Nightmares	Jean Rabe	March 2014
48	Grendel's Curse	Steven Savile	May 2014
49	The Devil's Chord	Michele Hauf	July 2014
50	Celtic Fire	Steven Savile	September 2014
51	Pretender's Gambit	Mel Odom	November 2014
52	Death Mask	Steven Savile	January 2015
53	Bathed in Blood	Joe Nassisse	March 2015
54	Day of Atonement	Steven Savile	May 2015
55	Beneath Still Waters	Joe Nassise	July 2015
56	The Mortality Principle	Steven Savile	September 2015
57	Mystic Warrior	Mel Odom	November 2015

=== Post-Shutdown Titles (Graphic Audio Exclusives) ===
Following the shutdown of Gold Eagle Publishing by Harlequin, the primary creator of audiobook adaptions of the franchise, Graphic Audio, acquired the rights to create original, in-house sequels to the novels, available exclusively in a narrated audio drama format.

Series #	Title	Author(s)	Date Released
58	Death Looms	Nanette Savard	December 2017
59	Eyes of the Beholder	Scott McCormick/Jillian Levine-Sisson	May 2018
60	In the Serpent's Tomb	Scott McCormick/Jillian Levine-Sisson	May 2019
61	Secret of the Monkey King	Christopher L. Bennett/Nanette Savard	August 2022
62	Treasure of the Monkey King	Christopher L. Bennett/Nanette Savard	August 2023
63	The Queen Jewels	Octavia J. McKenzie/Nanette Savard	August 2024

== Adaptations ==
=== Audiobooks ===
GraphicAudio have adapted all of the 57 Harlequin books into their dramatized audio format.

=== Comics ===
In 2008 IDW Publishing released a miniseries (five issues) written by Barbara Kesel and featuring art by Renae De Liz.
