= Jerry Ahern =

American writer (1946–2012)

- Born: Jerome Morrell Ahern; June 23, 1946; Chicago, Illinois, U.S.
- Died: July 24, 2012 (aged 66); Jefferson, Georgia, U.S.
- Occupations: Novelist, columnist
- Writing career
- Genre: Science fiction
- Notable work: The Survivalist

Jerome Morrell Ahern (June 23, 1946 – July 24, 2012) was an American writer of science fiction and action novels, non-fiction books, and articles for various firearms publications. He was considered an expert on firearms and related accessories, produced his own line of holsters, and served as president of firearms company Detonics.

== Biography ==
Jerry Ahern was the son of John and Arline Ahern. He was born and raised in Chicago and attended Lindblom High School. He served in the ROTC.

In 1969, he married Sharon and they had two children. Ahern wrote his first novel in 1980 and his first non-fiction book in 1996, and continued his writing career until his death. In addition to writing novels and non-fiction, Ahern was a contributor to various firearms publications such as Gun Digest, Guns Magazine, Dillon Precision's The Blue Press, Michael Bane's Down Range TV, among others. Ahern was considered an expert on firearm-related subjects and worked as an editorial consultant. Ahern and his wife also founded and ran a handgun holster company, Ahern Enterprises. From 2004 to 2007 Ahern was president of Detonics, a manufacturer of custom 1911-style pistols. Ahern died of cancer in Jefferson, Georgia.

== Novels ==
Jerry Ahern is best known for his post apocalyptic survivalist series, The Survivalist. The books in this series are heavy with descriptions of the weapons the protagonists use to survive and prosecute a seemingly never-ending war amongst the remnants of the superpowers from pre-apocalypse times. The series centers around the attempts of Dr. John Thomas Rourke, an ex-CIA agent, to preserve his family.

Most of the Ahern novels were written as a series, with multiple books containing the same characters. The underlying themes are survival, integrity, and perseverance. Ahern's four non-fiction books follow this theme and focus on self-defense and survival. His final published novel, with a semi-autobiographical character, was about a novelist and his family being transported through time to the 19th century. It was titled Written in Time. It was co-authored with his wife, Sharon Ahern.

Ahern, in collaboration with his wife Sharon, wrote more than 80 books prior to his death. Most of the books were published under his name but several series used the pseudonyms Axel Kilgore, Red Mitchell, and Nick Carter. Following Ahern's death, Sharon Ahern continues the various series, writing in conjunction with long-time family friend and writer Bob Anderson.

== Bibliography ==
The Survivalist

1. Total War (1981)
2. The Nightmare Begins (1981)
3. The Quest (1981)
4. The Doomsayer (1981)
5. The Web (1983)
6. The Savage Horde (1983)
7. The Prophet (1984)
8. The End Is Coming (1984)
9. Earth Fire (1984)
10. The Awakening (1984)
11. The Reprisal (1985)
12. The Rebellion (1985)
13. Pursuit (1986)
14. The Terror (1986)
15. Overlord (1987)
16. The Arsenal (1987)
17. The Ordeal (1988)
18. The Struggle (1989)
19. Final Rain (1989)
20. Firestorm (1989)
21. To End All War (1990)
22. Brutal Conquest (1991)
23. Call To Battle (1992)
24. Blood Assassins (1992)
25. War Mountain (1993)
26. Countdown (1993)
27. Death Watch (1993)
- Mid-Wake (1988)
- The Legend (1990)

Takers

- The Takers (1984) (with Sharon Ahern)
- River of Gold (1985)
- Summon the Demon (2001) (with Sharon Ahern)

Defender

1. The Battle Begins (1988)
2. The Killing Wedge (1988)
3. Out of Control (1988)
4. Decision Time (1988)
5. Entrapment (1989)
6. Escape (1989)
7. Vengeance (1989)
8. Justice Denied (1989)
9. Deathgrip (1989)
10. The Good Fight (1990)
11. The Challenge (1990)
12. No Survivors (1990)

Surgical Strike

1. Surgical Strike (1988)
2. Assault on the Empress (1988)
3. Infiltrator (1990)

Other Novels

- The Confederate (1983)
- The Freeman (1986) (with Sharon Ahern)
- Miamigrad (1987) (with Sharon Ahern)
- Yakusa Tattoo (1988) (with Sharon Ahern)
- Brandywine (1989)
- WerewolveSS (1990) (with Sharon Ahern)
- The Kamikaze Legacy (1990) (with Sharon Ahern)
- The Golden Shield of the IBF (1999) (with Sharon Ahern)
- The Illegal Man (2003) (with Sharon Ahern)
- Written in Time (2010) (with Sharon Ahern)

Track

1. The Ninety-Nine (1984)
2. Atrocity (1984)
3. The Hard Way (1984)
4. Armageddon Conspiracy (1984)
5. Origin of a Vendetta (1985)
6. Certain Blood (1985)
7. Master of D.E.A.T.H. (1985)
8. Revenge of the Master (1985)
9. The D.E.A.T.H. Hunters (1985)
10. Cocaine Run (1985)

They Call Me the Mercenary Series (as Axel Kilgore)

1. The Killer Genesis (1980)
2. The Slaughter Run (1980)
3. Fourth Reich Death Squad (1980)
4. The Opium Hunter (1981)
5. Canadian Killing Ground (1981)
6. Vengeance Army (1981)
7. Slave of the Warmonger (1981)
8. Assassin's Express (1982)
9. The Terror Contract (1982)
10. Bush Warfare (1982)
11. Death Lust! (1982)
12. Headshot! (1982)
13. Naked Blade, Naked Gun (1983)
14. The Siberian Alternative (1983)
15. The Afghanistan Penetration (1983)
16. China Bloodhunt (1983)
17. Buckingham Blowout (1984)
18. Eye for Eye (1984)

Non fiction

- CCW: Carrying Concealed Weapons: How to Carry Concealed Weapons and Know When Others Are (1996)
- Survive!: The Disaster, Crisis and Emergency Handbook (2010)

Short stories

- Roll Call (1993) (with Sharon Ahern) - published in the Anthology Confederacy of the Dead
- ...For I Have Sinned (1995) (with Samantha Ahern and Sharon Ahern) - published in the Anthology More Phobias
