= The Survivalist (novel series) =

Series of 29 pulp novels

The Survivalist is the generic title of Jerry Ahern's long-lived series of 29 pulp novels centering around John Rourke, an ex-CIA officer turned weapons and survival expert, in the aftermath of a nuclear war.

== Background ==
Ahern produced twenty-seven novels in numbered sequence, plus two un-numbered novels which fit between 15/16 and 21/22, selling 3.5 million copies in total.

The first few books cover Rourke's attempts to find his family, on the way fighting invading Soviet troops as well as typical post-apocalyptic villains such as biker gangs, mutants and cannibals in extended scenes of graphic violence. Later books head more into science fiction with cryonics, doomsday weapons and underwater cities.

Starting in 2007, audio versions started to be released by Graphic Audio covering the entire series of novels. The last book released in 2011.

The series was long out of print, until the continuation of the series in The Inheritors of Earth which was released June 2013. However e-book versions of the entire series are available.

== Major characters ==
=== John Thomas Rourke ===
Doctor, survival and weapons expert, and ex-CIA paramilitary operations officer. He has keen sight, but is consequently sensitive to bright light and is usually wearing sunglasses, even at night. He is always armed with a pair of Detonics Combat Master .45 pistols in Alessi shoulder holsters, Colt Python and Colt Lawman revolvers, an A.G. Russell Sting 1A boot knife, and either a CAR-15 carbine or a Steyr-Mannlicher SSG sniper rifle.

=== Sarah Rourke ===
Rourke's wife (later wife of Col. Wolfgang Mann) Children's Author and Illustrator before the war. She carries a stock Government M1911.45 while fleeing the Soviets with her children. The weapon becomes rust pitted and badly maintained because of her limited understanding of guns. Later she is gifted a custom .45 with "Trapper Gun" etched on the slide. It was based on a Colt Combat Commander, similar in size to Rourke's Detonics pistols. Sarah also utilizes different M16's throughout the series.

=== Michael Rourke ===
John and Sarah Rourke's son. Natalia Tiemerovna's lover and husband. Michael Rourke adopts 2 single action .44 Magnums in his 5-year tutorage (along with Annie) by Rourke while the rest of the family cryogenically sleep. Realising they are to slow to load in a combat situation he acquires two Beretta 92SBF's from Eden stores. Carries them in a double shoulder holster rig like his father. He also receives a Crain Life Support System I knife replica, a gift from an Icelandic knife maker.

=== Annie Rourke ===
John and Sarah Rourke's daughter. Paul Rubenstein's eventual wife.

=== Paul Rubenstein ===
John Rourke's sidekick, fellow survivor of the Albuquerque airliner crash on the night of the war. Fond of his looted Browning Hi-Power 9 mm pistol and vintage WW II "Schmeisser" MP-40 submachine gun. Wields a Gerber Mk II fighting knife later in the series given to him by Rourke.

=== Major Natalia Tiemerovna ===
Adopted surreptitiously as a niece by General Varakov, after her real parents were killed by the KGB. After her surrogate parents died in a road accident, Natalia trained as a KGB agent, reaching the rank of major by the beginning of the war. Married to the unpredictable and often exceedingly ruthless Vladimir Karamatzov—the head of the KGB in the U.S.—whom she eventually left after being beaten and otherwise mistreated—she developed a close relationship with Rourke. Tiemerovna's favorite weapons include a suppressed Walther pistol, an M16 and a butterfly knife.

=== General Ishmael Varakov ===
Natalia's uncle, and leader of the Soviet occupation forces in the U.S., Varakov many times shows himself to be a patriotic, honorable and reasonable Soviet soldier, who at times helps Rourke to stop some of the more extreme plans of the KGB. Varakov is at his best when he spews withering insults upon one of his country's intelligence assets who has survived to become a person of importance in the remnants of the U.S. federal government. Varakov tells this spy (controlled by blackmail due to his pedophilia) that if the spy makes the slightest error for any reason, Varakov will reveal him to the Americans. On the other hand, if the spy ever harms another child and Varakov learns of it, Varakov warns that he will kill the spy by hand. Eventually, Rourke holds the injured spy at gunpoint and promises him morphine in exchange for the means to radio Varakov, but rather than doing as he said, Rourke shoots the spy dead for his misdeeds.

=== Vladimir Karamatsov ===
Nemesis of Rourke, husband of Natalia Tiemerovna, head of the North American branch of the KGB. Rourke shot Karamatsov at General Varakov's request, since it was politically impossible for Varakov himself to take revenge for the mistreatment of Natalia. Karmatsov somehow survived Rourke's attack, but was later killed by Natalia herself.

=== Colonel Nehemiah Rozhdestvenskiy ===
Head of the KGB after Karamatzov's death. So power-crazed he even shoots down an airliner carrying the surviving members of the Soviet Politburo to the U.S.

== Plot overview ==
Soviet Army troops cross the Khyber Pass from Afghanistan into Pakistan. John Rourke is conducting classes in Pakistan and witnesses the invasion. Rourke then attempts to return home to the United States.

The Soviet leaders launch a nuclear strike against the U.S. and the U.S. president retaliates in kind. Nearly two hundred million Americans and over a hundred million Soviets are killed in the ensuing nuclear exchange, and tsunamis hit both California and New York. Rourke is on a Boeing 747 bound for Georgia when the missiles hit, and the pilots are blinded by the explosions. Rourke manages to crash-land the plane near Albuquerque, New Mexico and teams up with Paul Rubenstein, another survivor of the crash.

With Soviet airborne forces landing on U.S. soil, and almost every other major U.S. politician dead, the U.S. president commits suicide to prevent a forced surrender. Rourke's family become refugees after a gang of looters attack their farm.

Searching for a NASA astronaut who knows about a mysterious "Eden Project", Rourke enters Soviet-occupied Athens, Georgia, and is captured. Varakov has a job for him: Rourke is to kill Karamatzov, who has beaten Natalia on suspicion of adultery with Rourke.

A National Guard officer joins forces with a cult of wild-men to infiltrate a remaining missile silo and use the missiles to destroy Chicago. While Rourke's family fight with the resistance and the Soviets experiment with cryonic suspension, Rourke and Natalia fight the wild-men to save the city.

Rourke finally finds his family in Tennessee, and takes them to his survival retreat. To save themselves from war-induced climate change (specifically, the ionization of the atmosphere due to unexplained side effects of the nuclear exchange), the KGB loot Eden Project cryonics research from the Johnson Space Center, while Rourke and Natalia fight through Soviet troops, feral dogs, and cannibals to discuss the coming 'end of the world' with Varakov in Chicago.

Rourke and Natalia break into 'The Womb', a Soviet survival habitat in what used to be NORAD, to prevent the KGB from destroying the Eden Project shuttles on their return to Earth. The two take cryonics equipment allowing the Rourkes, Paul, and Natalia to survive the impending climatic catastrophe. Almost all life on the Earth's surface is wiped out, with Varakov dying in Chicago. Rozhdestvenskiy, searching for Rourke in Georgia, dies in a climactic shootout with him, even as the world's atmosphere ignites above them.

Having planned a five hundred year cryogenic sleep to await the returning Eden Project shuttles, Rourke awakens Annie and Michael early, raising them until their late teens. He then returns himself to cryogenic suspension so they'll be adults by the time that he and the others awaken. Michael explores the post-apocalypse world, finding tribes of cannibals surrounding a pre-war fallout shelter where the occupants rigorously maintain a limited population, sending excess workers outside to die.

The Eden Project (an international project) returns and lands in Georgia at a makeshift runway created by the Rourkes and they form a colony there. The Soviet Union has survived in massive underground shelters and continues their conflict with the Rourke family across the globe. Nazi Germany also survived in an underground shelter in South America but the Nazi regime is overthrown through the efforts of Rourke and his family. The now democratic German colony become staunch allies of Rourke. Iceland's inhabitants survived in hollow volcanoes and join the Rourke family in their battles. A particularly dramatic book, Mid-Wake, details how the United States survived in an underwater colony in the Pacific. A Soviet colony nearby also survived and both colonies have continued the war over the last five centuries. The Chinese survived in three underground cities and become involved in battles as well. The books end with an alliance of the freedom-loving states defeating the evil regime states and peace returning to the Earth.

== Weapons and equipment details ==
Ahern is very meticulous in his description of the weapons and equipment used by characters in the story, particularly with regard to his hero's preferences. So, for instance, John Thomas Rourke does not carry a .357 Magnum as his backup gun, he carries a Colt Python .357 Magnum revolver customized by Mag-na-port and Metalife, firing Federal Premium jacketed hollowpoint ammunition.

Such detail regarding the brands and specific products endorsed by Rourke extends to all sorts of items that appear in the series. This list is representative, but by no means complete. John Thomas Rourke favors:

- Steyr-Mannlicher SSG rifle
- Colt CAR-15 assault rifle
- twin stainless steel Detonics .45 handguns
- Colt Python revolver
- Colt Lawman .357 snub nose revolver
- Colt Government Mark IV .45
- Alessi shoulder rig
- Ranger leather holsters
- Pachmayr handgun grips
- Custom recoil suppression by Mag-na-port
- Firearms refinishing by Metalife Industries
- Safariland speedloaders
- Jack Crain LSS survival knife
- Chris Miller Bowie knife
- AG Russell Sting IA boot knife
- M16 bayonet
- Lowe Alpine Loco Pack backpack
- Kel-Lite flashlight
- Bushnell Corporation 8x30 armoured binoculars
- Aviator sunglasses
- Zippo cigarette lighters
- Black-faced Rolex Sub-mariner wristwatch
- Coleman camp stoves and lanterns
- Mountain House freeze-dried meals
- Harley-Davidson motorcycles

== Books ==
- No.1 Total War (1981) ISBN 0-89083-960-3
- No.2 The Nightmare Begins (1981) ISBN 0-89083-810-0
- No.3 The Quest (1981) ISBN 0-89083-851-8
- No.4 The Doomsayer (1981) ISBN 0-89083-893-3
- No.5 The Web (1983) ISBN 0-8217-1145-8
- No.6 The Savage Horde (1983) ISBN 0-8217-1243-8
- No.7 The Prophet (1984) ISBN 0-8217-1339-6
- No.8 The End is Coming (1984) ISBN 0-8217-1374-4
- No.9 Earth Fire (1984) ISBN 0-8217-1405-8
- No.10 The Awakening (1984) ISBN 0-8217-1478-3
- No.11 The Reprisal (1985) ISBN 0-8217-1590-9
- No.12 The Rebellion (1985) ISBN 0-8217-1676-X
- No.13 Pursuit (1986) ISBN 0-8217-1877-0
- No.14 The Terror (1987) ISBN 0-8217-1972-6
- No.15 Overlord (1987) ISBN 0-8217-2070-8
- Mid-Wake (1988) ISBN 0-8217-2279-4
- No.16 The Arsenal (1988) ISBN 0-8217-2355-3
- No.17 The Ordeal (1988) ISBN 0-8217-2513-0
- No.18 The Struggle (1989) ISBN 0-8217-2581-5
- No.19 Final Rain (1989) ISBN 0-8217-2684-6
- No.20 Firestorm (1989) ISBN 0-8217-2990-X
- No.21 ...To End all War (1990) ISBN 0-8217-3144-0
- The Legend (1991) ISBN 0-8217-3271-4
- No.22 Brutal Conquest (1991) ISBN 0-8217-3538-1
- No.23 Call to Battle (1992) ISBN 0-8217-3698-1
- No.24 Blood Assassins (1992) ISBN 0-8217-3909-3
- No.25 War Mountain (1993) ISBN 0-8217-4100-4
- No.26 Countdown (1993) ISBN 0-8217-4229-9
- No.27 Death Watch (1993) ISBN 0-8217-4410-0
- No.28 "Mid-Wake"
- No.29 "The Legend"
- No.30 "The Inheritors of Earth (2013) with Bob Anderson
- No.31 "Earth Shine" (2013) with Bob Anderson
- No.32 "The Quisling Covenant" (2014) with Bob Anderson
- No.33 "Deep Star" (2015) with Bob Anderson
- No.34 "Lodestar" (2016) with Bob Anderson
- No.35 "Blood Moon" (2018) with Bob Anderson
- No.36 "Operation Phoenix" (2019) with Bob Anderson

== Sources ==
Other than the books themselves:

- Nuclear Holocausts Bibliography
