= Jon Sprunk =

American fantasy author

- Born: Pennsylvania, United States
- Education: Lock Haven University of Pennsylvania (B.A.)
- Occupation: Writer
- Writing career
- Language: English
- Subject: Fantasy

Jon Sprunk (fl. 1992 - 2019), is an American fantasy author. He grew up in central Pennsylvania and attended Lock Haven University, graduating with a B.A. in English in 1992.

== Bibliography ==
=== Novels ===
==== Shadow Saga ====
- Shadow’s Son (2010)
- Shadow’s Lure (2011)
- Shadow’s Master (2012)

==== The Book of the Black Earth ====
- Blood and Iron (March 11, 2014)
- Storm and Steel (June 2, 2015)
- Blade and Bone (February 27, 2018)
- Sun and Serpent (December 17, 2019)

=== Short Fiction in Anthologies ===
- The Artist in Cloaked in Shadow: Dark Tales of Elves (2003)
- Sign of the Cross in Dreams & Visions #34 (2005)
- Office Magic in Modern Magic: Tales of Fantasy and Horror (2006)
- The Farmer’s Daughter (2006)
- The Wu Jen (2010)

== Adaptations ==
Sprunk's Shadow Saga was adapted as a full-cast audiobook series by GraphicAudio.
