= Love Inspired =

Canadian publisher

- Parent company: Harlequin (HarperCollins)
- Founded: 2000
- Country of origin: Canada
- Headquarters location: Toronto
- Publication types: Books
- Fiction genres: Christian Fiction
- Imprints: Love Inspired; Love Inspired Classics; Love Inspired Cold Case; Love Inspired Historical; Love Inspired Inspirational Romance; Love Inspired Mountain Rescue; Love Inspired Novels; Love Inspired Special Releases; Love Inspired Suspense
- Official website: www.loveinspired.com

Love Inspired is an imprint of Harlequin Enterprises that is focused on Christian Fiction.

The original and largest body of works under the "Love Inspired" name is the romance novels. Love Inspired Suspense and Love Inspired Historical represent a branching of the romance genre to a more particular theme and setting. A number of books have been released as Love Inspired Special releases sometimes containing the listing of Love Inspired Classics or going under different brands. In total more than 762 books comprise the Love Inspired brand.

The first release of Love Inspired was The Perfect Couple by Valerie Hansen in November 2000, with the second book being Tested by Fire by Kathryn Springer in August 2004. Books have been released monthly since, with the Love Inspired Suspense line of books beginning in July 2005 with Note of Peril by Hannah Alexander and Love Inspired Historical beginning in February 2008 with The Briton by Catherine Palmer. A collection of Love Inspired Special releases, including bearing the name Love Inspired Classics or other brandings have been used; with the first publication being Hearts Evergreen containing the work of Robin Lee Hatcher and Kathryn Springer.

== Focus ==
Love Inspired books are romances that are strongly rooted in traditional Christian and moral values. Publications include faith elements, have no graphic violence, premarital sex, or romances based on emotional over sexual desires. Harlequin's website states that Love Inspired is likened to Touched by an Angel, Seventh Heaven, or Gilmore Girls in terms of content.

== List of Love Inspired books ==
Number	Title	Author	Released	Reference
1	The Perfect Couple	Valerie Hansen	November 2000	
2	Tested by Fire	Kathryn Springer	August 2004	
3	Gabriel's Discovery	Felicia Mason	September 2004	
4	A Heart's Refuge	Carolyne Aarsen	September 2004	
5	A Tender Touch	Lenora Worth	September 2004	
6	Everlasting Love	Valerie Hansen	September 2004	
7	Redeeming Travis	Kate Welsh	October 2004	
8	A New Life	Dana Corbit	October 2004	
9	Gold in the Fire	Margaret Daley	October 2004	
10	Loving Constance	Lyn Cote	November 2004	
11	Peter's Return	Cynthia Cooke	November 2004	
12	Shadows in the Mirror	Linda Hall	October 2007	
13	Shadows at the Window	Linda Hall	July 2008	
14	Shadows on the River	Linda Hall	April 2009	

== Imprints ==
Name	Description
Love Inspired	
Love Inspired Classics	
Love Inspired Cold Case	
Love Inspired Historical	Historical fiction
Love Inspired Inspirational Romance	
Love Inspired Mountain Rescue	
Love Inspired Novels	
Love Inspired Special Releases	
Love Inspired Suspense	Romantic suspense
