= Wayne of Gotham =

2012 Batman novel

- Author: Tracy Hickman
- Language: English
- Genre: Detective fiction Superhero fiction
- Publisher: DC Comics, It Books
- Publication date: December 4, 2012
- Publication place: United States
- Media type: Print
- Pages: 304 pg
- ISBN: 0-062-21986-3

Wayne of Gotham is a novel by Tracy Hickman and is about the fictional superhero Batman. The book was published on December 4, 2012. A GraphicAudio audiobook was recorded in 2013.

== Plot ==
In 1957, Thomas Wayne meets Martha Kane and wonders why she can't love him like he loves her. Thomas' father, Patrick, mocks Martha and her society friends and demands that Thomas learn to be the predator and not the prey. Thomas meets with Dr. Ernst Richter at Arkham Asylum and they begin creating a virus against human evil. Over the next year, they kidnap four prominent Gothamites to use as test subjects. The four become Gotham City's vigilante group, The Apocalypse.

During a masquerade ball held at Wayne Manor, Thomas is confronted by one of the test subjects: Denholm Sinclair, AKA Disciple. Thomas leads him to the cave underneath Wayne Manor in hopes of trapping him. He finds Patrick Wayne's old shotgun and fires all six shots at Disciple, killing him. Disciple's blood spills into the Gotham River.

Over 50 years later, a middle-aged Batman investigates a case where various people are committing crimes under the influence of mind control. During this investigation, he finds a witness report by Dr. Ernst Richter's daughter, Marion Richter, claiming Bruce's parents were killed due to their business with her father. Intrigued, he reopens the case of his parents' death.

Bruce tracks down Marion's sister Amanda and discovers the two "sisters" are multiple personalities of the same woman, under the care of Nurse Ellen Doppel. As Batman, Bruce unearths a series of documents detailing the full story of the Apocalypse experiments. When Nurse Doppel attempts to steal some of the documents, Batman gives them to her willingly, knowing she will lead him to her controller. Doppel heads to the home of Gotham City kingpin Lewis Moxon and his daughter, Mallory, Bruce's childhood friend.

Mallory tells Bruce the Apocalypse isn't something to speak to her father of, while taking a call that she got the book. Bruce checks who called her and is surprised to hear Alfred's voice. Bruce confronts Alfred at the manor, and Alfred reveals that he has known about Apocalypse for years and that the Richters have been blackmailing the Waynes about it ever since.

Batman goes to the condemned Kane Mansion, formerly the home of his mother's family. He fends off an ambush, rescues a captured Marion/Amanda, and obtains an audio recording of Thomas Wayne's testimony regarding what happened on the night of the 1958 costume party. Back in the Batcave, Batman finishes the tape and learns the rest of the story. Bruce answers a call from Nurse Doppel about Marion/Amanda and suddenly wakes up alongside Amanda at the Academy Theater, where his parents were murdered. He heads outside, where Nurse Doppel shoots him. Doppel reveals to Bruce that she is Marion and that "Amanda" is the real Nurse Doppel, with the late Amanda's memories implanted. She explains she wants him dead as his family took everything from hers, and she took control of any villain she could catch to show him his family's dark past. The real Nurse Doppel arrives and, remembering who she is, kills Marion.

Six months later, Alfred and Commissioner Gordon talk about the funeral held for Bruce and what kind of man he was. Once Gordon leaves, Batman reveals himself to Alfred, deciding to stay dead as he always felt he was when his parents were killed. He asks if people ever truly know their parents and Alfred believes its best to know them from how we remember them, not for who they truly were.

== Reviews ==
Eric Garneau wrote that "there are a few nice things to be said about Hickman's writing. The story alternates between the present and the past, and it does so in a way that we see events unfold for Thomas and Bruce in a parallel fashion; one timeline colors the other. It's a common device, but Hickman uses it well".

Robert Silva said that "Wayne of Gotham is not a bad book", writing that the novel was not the story he was expecting. He wrote: "When I buy a book with Batman on the cover I expect to read about Batman for a majority of the book, which was not the case with WOG. Although Thomas is a great character to follow, Batman is why I'm here and I felt that his story fell a bit flat". Silva gave the book six out of 10 points.

USA Today gave a generally favorable review, saying: "Wayne of Gotham might be a Batman story, but by the end of it, the only guy you want to spend extra time with is the Dark Knight's dear old dad". The review praised the novel's insight into Bruce Wayne's thoughts, saying that "Hickman gives him little smirks and shows insight into his problem-solving mind-set", but said that the real strength of the book is fleshing out the character of Bruce's father.

Salt Lake City's Deseret News had a more negative view, criticizing the book for "veering off in a direction that is seemingly completely unsupported by current comic book arcs". The novel is mostly focused on new characters, rather than familiar faces from the comic book: "A risky move, this stands to earn him praise from those who find the new territory refreshing and interesting, but criticism from fans who pick up a Batman book with certain expectations". Ultimately, the review found that "this novel doesn't satisfy as much as other Batman novels, comics and films and is too distracted by a newly crafted history, slightly cheesy 1950s dialogue and somewhat repetitive exposition".
