= Relic of Empire =

1992 novel by W. Michael Gear

- Author: W. Michael Gear
- Cover artist: Sanjulián
- Language: English
- Series: Forbidden Borders trilogy
- Genre: Science fiction
- Publisher: Daw Books
- Publication date: April 1992
- Publication place: United States
- Media type: Print (paperback)
- Pages: 626 (reissue paperback edition)
- ISBN: 0-88677-492-6 (reissue paperback edition)
- OCLC: 25623197
- Followed by: Counter Measures

Relic of Empire is a science fiction novel by American writer W. Michael Gear.

== Plot introduction ==
Set in a future where an advanced humanity has forgotten their origins on Earth, the novel describes the political equations and power struggle between the emperor, a quasi-religious group, a pre-sentient computer named the Mag Comm and the Lord Commander.

== Plot summary ==
Humanity is trapped in a "gravity well", the so-called Forbidden Borders. Two remaining human empires - the Regan Empire and the Divine Sassa - are poised to fight one last war for domination of Free Space. The Lord Commander, Staffa Kar Therma a.k.a. The Star Butcher, is a mercenary who leads an elite group of soldiers (the Companions). He has aligned himself to The Seddi Order, a former quasi-religious group in an effort to stop humanity from making itself extinct.

The Regan Emperor has been assassinated, and Internal Security Minister Ily Takka has now taken control of the Regan Empire. She plots darkly, and has ordered little respected, but brilliant, Division First (Commander) Sinklar Fist to return to Rega and become the leader of her military.

== Characters ==
- The Others: The (supposedly alien and superintelligent) beings who confined humanity inside the Forbidden Borders. They also built the MagComm.
- Staffa Kar Therma aka the Lord Commander of the Companions: A protagonist & possible savior
- Ily Takka, Minister of Internal Security: A protagonist & she is unofficial ruler of Regan Empire
- Seddi Magister Kayalla Dawn: Current leader of the Seddi Order
- Sinklar Fist: Son of Staffa Kar Therma, Lord Commander of Regan Military
- Skyla Lyma, Wing Commander and 2nd in Command of the Companions & Staffa's current lover.
- Ben MacRuder, Division First: Commander of the 1st Targan Assault Division: He is best friend with Sinklar Fist and commands Regan space Battlecruiser Gyton
- Anatolia Daviura, Regan Researcher: Close friend of Sinklar Fist
- Arta Fera, Regan Assassin: original Seddi Assassin, originally cloned from Chrysla to kill Staffa
- Myles Roma, Sassan Divine Legate Prima: 2nd highest leader of the Divine Sassan empire.
- Chrysla: Wife of Staffa. Thought killed when Staffa personally destroyed the Battleship Pylos.
- Mag Comm: Self-Aware Computer built by The Others, in Makarta Mountain on the Planet Targa.
