= Ryder Syvertsen =

Ryder Syvertsen (born Reidar Otto Syvertsen, 1941–2015) was a prolific American author who wrote or co-authored over 30 science fiction, fantasy, and action-adventure books. He is best known for his contributions to the 1980's "men's adventure" and surrealist subgenres, including co-authoring 4 books and solo-writing 15 books in the Doomsday Warrior series under the pen name Ryder Stacy. His body of work is documented under his real name in The Encyclopedia of Science Fiction.

== Life ==
Syvertsen was born Reidar Otto Syvertsen on April 19, 1941, son of Otto and Lillian Syvertsen. A lifelong New Yorker, he graduated from Taft High School and went on to receive his BA in 1969 and MA in 1971 from SUNY Binghamton. In 1979 he was awarded his Teaching Certification from Hunter College. He then taught science at the Martin Luther King Jr. High School in Manhattan and essay writing as an adjunct professor at St. John's University, Pace University, and CUNY College of Staten Island. He was also a creative writing instructor in the Mystery Writers of America “Mentor Program.” His Buddhist faith and study of meditation with Tibetan monks led to a lasting interest in Tibet as a setting for his fiction as well as sympathy with the Tibetan resistance to Chinese rule.

Syvertsen authored or co-authored a total of 34 science fiction, action-adventure, and fantasy books. He is best known for Doomsday Warrior, a series of 19 novellas set in and after 2089, depicting the struggle to free America from Soviet domination following defeat in a nuclear conflagration, under the command of rebel leader Ted Rockson. The first four books in the Doomsday Warrior series were written in collaboration with Jan Stacy; the remainder were written by Syvertsen alone. The series was published as part of the Zebra Books’ Men’s Adventure series, under the pseudonym of Ryder Stacy. GraphicAudio versions of all 19 books were produced.

A second series, the Computerized Attack/Defense System (C.A.D.S.) novels, features Colonel Dean Sturgis as commander of a new generation of high-tech soldiers. The first of the C.A.D.S. novels was written in collaboration with Jan Stacy, #2-8 solely by Syvertsen. (Four additional books, C.A.D.S. #9-12, were written by David Alexander as sole author.) A third series, Syvertsen’s personal favorite, is the six-part Mystic Rebel series, set in Tibet and featuring CIA operative Bart Lasker. Syvertsen’s only stand-alone work of fiction, Psychic Spawn, co-authored with Rosemary Ellen Guiley writing under the name of Adrian Fletcher, was singled out by Visionary Living as enjoying “a rebirth of deserved attention." It follows the adventures of Rainer Stern, tortured by the Nazis as a child, as he confronts a band of psychic super-children bred by his old Nazi nemesis thirty years later.

In addition to his works of fiction, Syvertsen co-authored (with Jan Stacy) three reference books on the film industry. The two described themselves as "pop sociologists". Two – the Great Book of Movie Monsters and the Great Book of Movie Villains – are encyclopedia-like compilations; the third, Rockin’ Reels, is a genre book listing and exploring the history of rock-n-roll themed movies.

In 1989, Syvertsen married Paige Lewis. The couple had one son, born in 1993. Syvertsen died on Feb. 24, 2015.

== Books ==
=== Fiction ===
==== Doomsday Warrior (series), published under the pseudonym Ryder Stacy ====
- Doomsday Warrior #1 (with Jan Stacy). New York: Zebra Books, 1984, ISBN 978-0821713563.
- Doomsday Warrior #2 Red America (with Jan Stacy). New York: Zebra Books, 1984, ISBN 978-0821714195.
- Doomsday Warrior #3 The Last American (with Jan Stacy). New York: Zebra Books, 1984, ISBN 978-0821714898.
- Doomsday Warrior #4 Bloody America (with Jan Stacy). New York: Zebra Books, 1985, ISBN 978-0821715567.
- Doomsday Warrior #5 America's Last Declaration. New York: Zebra Books, 1985, ISBN 978-0821716083.
- Doomsday Warrior #6 American Rebellion. New York: Zebra Books, 1985, ISBN 978-0821716595.
- Doomsday Warrior #7 American Defiance. New York: Zebra Books, 1986, ISBN 978-0821717455.
- Doomsday Warrior #8 American Glory. New York: Zebra Books, 1986, ISBN 978-0821718124.
- Doomsday Warrior #9 America's Zero Hour. New York: Zebra Books, 1986, ISBN 978-0821719299.
- Doomsday Warrior #10 American Nightmare. New York: Zebra Books, 1987, ISBN 978-0821720219.
- Doomsday Warrior #11 American Eden. New York: Zebra Books, 1987, ISBN 978-0821720981.
- Doomsday Warrior #12 Death, American Style. New York: Zebra Books, 1987, ISBN 978-0821722114.
- Doomsday Warrior #13 American Paradise. New York: Zebra Books, 1988, ISBN 978-0821723388.
- Doomsday Warrior #14 American Death Orbit. New York: Zebra Books, 1988, ISBN 978-0821724583.
- Doomsday Warrior #15 American Ultimatum. New York: Zebra Books, 1989, ISBN 978-0821725870.
- Doomsday Warrior #16 American Overthrow. New York: Zebra Books, 1989, ISBN 978-0821727409.
- Doomsday Warrior #17 America’s Sword. New York: Zebra Books, 1989, ISBN 978-0821728727.
- Doomsday Warrior #18 American Dream Machine. New York: Zebra Books, 1990, ISBN 978-0821730744.
- Doomsday Warrior #19 America's Final Defense. New York: Zebra Books, 1991, ISBN 978-0821734513.

==== C.A.D.S. (Computerized Attack/Defense System) (series), published under the pseudonym John Sievert ====
- C.A.D.S. #1 [Nuke First Strike] (with Jan Stacy). New York: Zebra Books, 1985, ISBN 978-0821716410.
- C.A.D.S. #2: Tech Background. New York: Zebra Books, 1986, ISBN 978-0821717905.
- C.A.D.S. #3: Tech Commando. New York: Zebra Books, 1986, ISBN 978-0821718933.
- C.A.D.S. #4: Tech Strike Force. New York: Zebra Books, 1987, ISBN 978-0821719930.
- C.A.D.S. #5: Tech Satan. New York: Zebra Books, 1988, ISBN 978-0821723135.
- C.A.D.S. #6: Tech Inferno. New York: Zebra Books, 1988, ISBN 978-0821724101.
- C.A.D.S. #7: Doom Commander. New York: Zebra Books, 1989, ISBN 978-0821726853.
- C.A.D.S. #8: Cybertech Killing Zone. New York: Zebra Books, 1989, ISBN 978-0821728185.
- C.A.D.S. #9: Suicide Attack. New York: Zebra Books, 1990, ISBN 978-0821729267.
- C.A.D.S. #10: Recon By Fire. New York: Zebra Books, 1990, ISBN 978-0821731475.
- C.A.D.S. #11: Death Zone Attack. New York: Zebra Books, 1991, ISBN 978-0821733745.
- C.A.D.S. #12: Tech Assassins. New York: Zebra Books, 1991, ISBN 978-0821736005.

==== Mystic Rebel (series), by Ryder Syvertsen ====
- Mystic Rebel #1. New York: Pinnacle Books, 1988, ISBN 978-1558175501.
- Mystic Rebel #2 The Dancing Dead. New York: Pinnacle Books, 1988, ISBN 978-1558170797.
- Mystic Rebel #3 Darkness Descends. New York: Pinnacle Books, 1988, ISBN 978-1558171046.
- Mystic Rebel #4 Temple of Dark Destiny. New York: Pinnacle Books, 1989, ISBN 978-1558172432.
- Mystic Rebel #5 Cave of the Master. New York: Pinnacle Books, 1990, ISBN 978-1558172432.
- Mystic Rebel #6 Fortress of Forbidden Destiny. New York: Pinnacle Books, 1991, ISBN 978-1558175501.

==== Stand-alone title, by Ryder Syvertsen and Adrian Fletcher (pseudonym of Rosemary Ellen Guiley) ====
- Psychic Spawn (by Ryder Syvertsen and Adrian Fletcher). New York: Popular Library, 1987, ISBN 978-0445204201.

=== Nonfiction ===
- The Great Book of Movie Monsters (by Jan Stacy and Ryder Syvertsen). Chicago, IL: Contemporary Books, 1983, ISBN 978-0809255252.
- The Great Book of Movie Villains: A Guide to the Screen's Meanies, Tough Guys, and Bullies (by Jan Stacy and Ryder Syvertsen). Pub Marketing Enterprises, 1984, ISBN 978-0809253517.
- Rockin’ Reels: An Illustrated History of Rock & Roll Movies (by Jan Stacy and Ryder Syvertsen). Chicago, IL: Contemporary Books, 1984, ISBN 978-0809254217.
