= Dragons Can Only Rust =

Novel

Dragons Can Only Rust is a novel by Chris Cymri published by TSR in 1995.

== Plot summary ==
Dragons Can Only Rust is a novel about a dragon named Gonard who was created in a laboratory, using artificial intelligence to think and speak and become self-aware.

== Reception ==
Jonathan Palmer reviewed Dragons Can Only Rust for Arcane magazine, rating it a 3 out of 10 overall. Palmer comments that "I waded through this literary quagmire in search of Gonard's soul and couldn't find it. Couldn't find anybody's soul. I rather thought Gonard had found as much soul as he was ever going to find simply by looking for it. This is what Itsa thinks, too, and this intuitive character expresses a valid point well, on several occasions. Maybe this reflects the view of the author. If so, then hates off, Zen on; but if it's so simple, why write about it?"

== Reviews ==
- Review by Carolyn Cushman (1996) in Locus, #420 January 1996
- Kliatt
