= Jon F. Merz =

American writer

- Occupations: Author, Screenwriter, Actor
- Writing career
- Genre: Urban Fantasy
- Website: jonfmerz.net

Jon F. Merz is a U.S. author, former soldier, and ex-government employee best known for the Lawson Vampire series, the third entry of which won the 2001 National Novel Writing Month competition. He had also begun production on a television adaptation of the Lawson Vampire series through his production company New Ronin Entertainment, which was set to begin filming in Medfield, Massachusetts.

As of 2019, there has been no known progress towards the Lawson Vampire TV series. Merz's blog has not been updated since 2016 and a Lawson Vampire book has not been published since 2015. It is unknown whether or not Merz will be continuing the Lawson series, as he has largely gone inactive on his website. However, he remains quite active on his Twitter and seems mostly focused on side projects and paperback printing of his already published Lawson novels.

Merz has also been a practitioner of Bujinkan Ninjutsu for over two decades, studying under Mark Davis in Boston, Massachusetts, and implements what he has learned from martial arts into his novels.

== Bibliography ==
=== Frank Steel series ===
- Fool for Green (2011)

=== HELLstalkers ===
1. The Cerberus Protocol (2012, co-written with Joseph Nassise)

=== Jake Thunder series ===
1. Danger-Close (2004)

=== Lawson Vampire series ===
1. The Fixer (2002)
2. The Invoker (2002)
3. The Destructor (2003)
4. The Syndicate (2003)
5. The Kensei (2011)
6. The Ripper (2012)

==== Lawson Vampire novellas and short stories ====
- Slave to Love (2011)
- Interlude (2011)
- Dead Drop (2011)
- The Shepherd (2011)
- Rudolf The Red Nosed Rogue (2011)
- The Price of a Good Drink (2011)
- Frosty the Hitman (2012)
- Chase the Fire (2017)

=== The Ninja Apprentice ===
- The Lost Scrolls of Fudo Shin (2012)
- "The Tsuba of Kotogawa" (2017)

=== Rogue Angel ===
- "Warrior Spirit" (2007, as Alex Archer)
- Soul Stealer (2008, as Alex Archer)
- "Polar Quest" (2009, as Alex Archer)
- "Sacrifice" (2009, as Alex Archer)
- "Footprints" (2009, as Alex Archer)
- "Sacred Ground" (2010, as Alex Archer)
- "Phantom Prospect" (2010, as Alex Archer)
- "False Horizon" (2011, as Alex Archer)
- "The Oracle's Message" (2011, as Alex Archer)
- "Labyrinth" (2012, as Alex Archer)
- "Fury's Goddess" (2012, as Alex Archer)

=== Shadow Warrior series ===
- The Undead Hordes of Kangul (2013)
- "Slavers of the Savage Catacombs" (2014)

=== Standalone novels ===
- Parallax (2009)
- Vicarious (2009)
- The Brank of Khosadam (2010)
- Shadow Chaser (2010)
- Prey (2011)
- "The Last Vampire (2017)

=== Short stories ===
- "I, the Courier" (1996, published in Rictus Magazine)
- Prisoner 392 (2009)
- This Time of Night (2010 - collection)

=== Non-fiction ===
- Learning Later, Living Greater: The Secret for Making the Most of Your After-50 Years (2006)
- The Complete Idiot's Guide to Ultimate Fighting (2007, co-written with Rich Franklin)
- How To Really Sell EBooks (2011)
