= Jim Mullaney =

American writer

- Born: James Mullaney; Massachusetts, U.S.
- Occupation: Writer
- Writing career
- Language: English
- Genre: action/adventure/mystery
- Notable works: The Destroyer series, The Red Menace series, Crag Banyon Mysteries
- Website: www.jamesmullaney.com

James Mullaney is an American writer. Mullaney was ghostwriter and later credited writer of 28 novels in The Destroyer paperback-novel series. He is currently the author of The Red Menace novel series as well as the Crag Banyon Mysteries series.

== Biography ==
James Mullaney is a Shamus Award-nominated author of over 50 books, as well as comics, short stories and novellas. His work has been published by New American Library, Gold Eagle/Harlequin, Marvel Comics, Tor and Moonstone Books. He was co-writer with Jim Uhls (Fight Club) the screenplay to the shelved Destroyer film adaptation for Sony, to be directed by Shane Black (Lethal Weapon, Iron Man 3). He was born in Massachusetts, the last of six children.

== Writing ==
=== The Destroyer ===
The first Destroyer novel to which Mullaney contributed was #88: The Ultimate Death; he then went on to become the sole writer of the series for issues #111-131. When the series moved from Gold Eagle to Tor Books, he and series co-creator Warren Murphy shared coauthor credit on The Destroyer, beginning May 2007. Mullaney stayed with the series until it ended its run at Tor in August 2008. Sony Pictures has announced that Mullaney has been hired, along with Jim Uhls, to co-write the script for a new Destroyer movie, which is currently in development.

=== Other work ===
Mullaney has two series of his own. The Red Menace is an adventure series centering on Patrick "Podge" Becket, a retired communist-fighter and secret agent from the 1950s who returns to crime-fighting in the 1970s, aided by his friend and partner Dr. Thaddeus Wainwright. The first novel, Red and Buried, was released on September 15, 2011 to mostly positive reviews. The paperback of Red and Buried was issued in paperback by Moonstone Books in 2013. Eight years later, Bold Venture Press released the first three works in paperback. The next three paperbacks were released in 2022. The seventh issue, Ruses Are Red, was released simultaneously in 2023 as both paperback and eBook editions.

Mullaney's second series surrounds the comic adventures of private investigator Crag Banyon; the first book, One Horse Open Slay was published on December 13, 2011 to positive reviews. The second Crag Banyon Mystery, Devil May Care, was released May 2012. A third Crag Banyon Mystery, Royal Flush, was 2012, followed by Sea No Evil and Bum Luck in 2013. They are all available in paperback. A sixth Banyon, Flying Blind was published in June, 2014.

Devil May Care was a 2013 Shamus Award finalist in the Best Indie P.I. Novel category.

Mullaney has also worked on Iron Fist for Marvel Comics.

=== The Destroyer series ===
1. The Destroyer 88: The Ultimate Death (written with Will Murray and Ric Meyers)
2. The Destroyer 111: Prophet of Doom
3. The Destroyer 112: Brain Storm
4. The Destroyer 113: The Empire Dreams (alternate title: Sins of the Fatherland)
5. The Destroyer 114: Failing Marks
6. The Destroyer 115: Misfortune Teller
7. The Destroyer 116: The Final Reel
8. The Destroyer 117: Deadly Genes
9. The Destroyer 118: Killer Watts
10. The Destroyer 119: Fade to Black
11. The Destroyer 120: The Last Monarch
12. The Destroyer 121: A Pound of Prevention
13. The Destroyer 122: Syndication Rites
14. The Destroyer 123: Disloyal Opposition
15. The Destroyer 124: By Eminent Domain
16. The Destroyer 125: The Wrong Stuff
17. The Destroyer 126: Air Raid
18. The Destroyer 127: Market Force
19. The Destroyer 128: The End of the Beginning
20. The Destroyer 129: Father to Son
21. The Destroyer 130: Waste Not, Want Not
22. The Destroyer 131: Unnatural Selection
23. The New Destroyer #1: Guardian Angel
24. The New Destroyer #2: Choke Hold
25. The New Destroyer #3: Dead Reckoning
26. The New Destroyer #4: Killer Ratings
27. The Destroyer 154: Blood Brotherhood
28. The Destroyer 155: Trial By Fire

=== The Red Menace series ===
1. Red and Buried
2. Drowning In Red Ink
3. Red the Riot Act
4. A Red Letter Day
5. Red on the Menu
6. Red Devil
7. Ruses are Red
8. The Sky Is Red
9. Red Meat
10. Terminal Red (NYP)

=== The Crag Banyon series ===
1. One Horse Open Slay (A Crag Banyon Mystery)
2. Devil May Care (A Crag Banyon Mystery)
3. Royal Flush (A Crag Banyon Mystery)
4. Sea No Evil (A Crag Banyon Mystery)
5. Bum Luck (A Crag Banyon Mystery)
6. Flying Blind (A Crag Banyon Mystery)
7. Shoot the Moon (A Crag Banyon Mystery)
8. The Butler Did I.T. (A Crag Banyon Mystery)
9. Sleep Tight, Wake Dead (A Crag Banyon Mystery)
10. X Is for Banyon (A Crag Banyon Mystery)
11. Habeas A Nice Corpus (A Crag Banyon Mystery)
12. Death Sentience (A Crag Banyon Mystery) (NYP)
