= Detonics =

American firearm company

Detonics Defense
- Company type: Privately held
- Founded: ~1976
- Headquarters: Millstadt, Illinois (since 2007), United States
- Products: Compact 1911-style pistols

Detonics was an American firearm manufacturing company founded around 1976, which had existed under several owners and variants of this name. Detonics was best known for its innovative design of compact self-loading pistols, such as the Pocket 9 and the 1911-style Combat Master.

== Iterations ==
- ~1976-1987: Detonics Manufacturing Company (Seattle, Washington)
- 1987-1992: New Detonics (Arizona)
- 2004-2007: Detonics USA (Georgia)

== Gallery ==
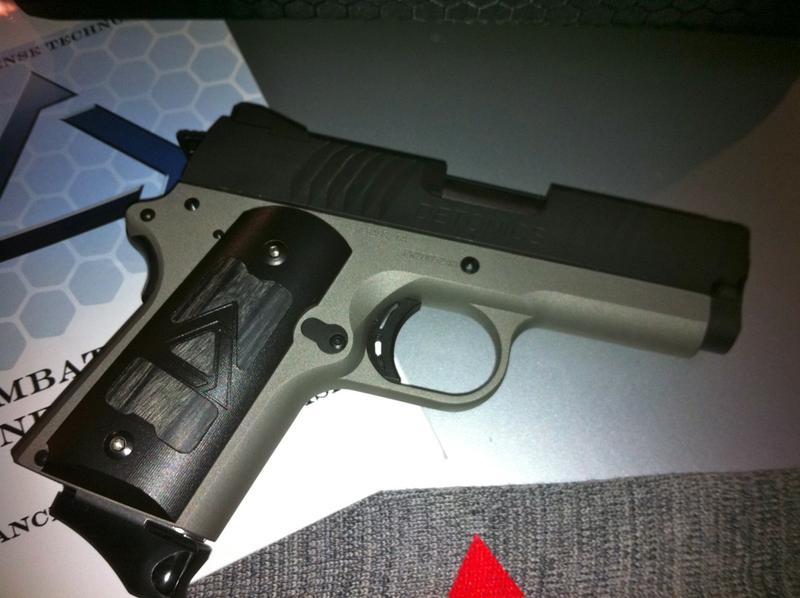
Detonics Legacy Combat Master

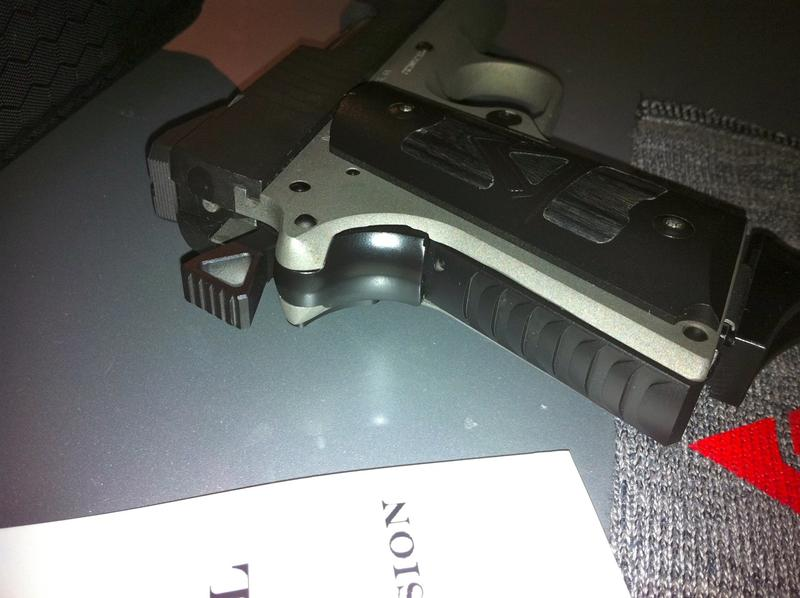
Detonics Legacy, backstrap view

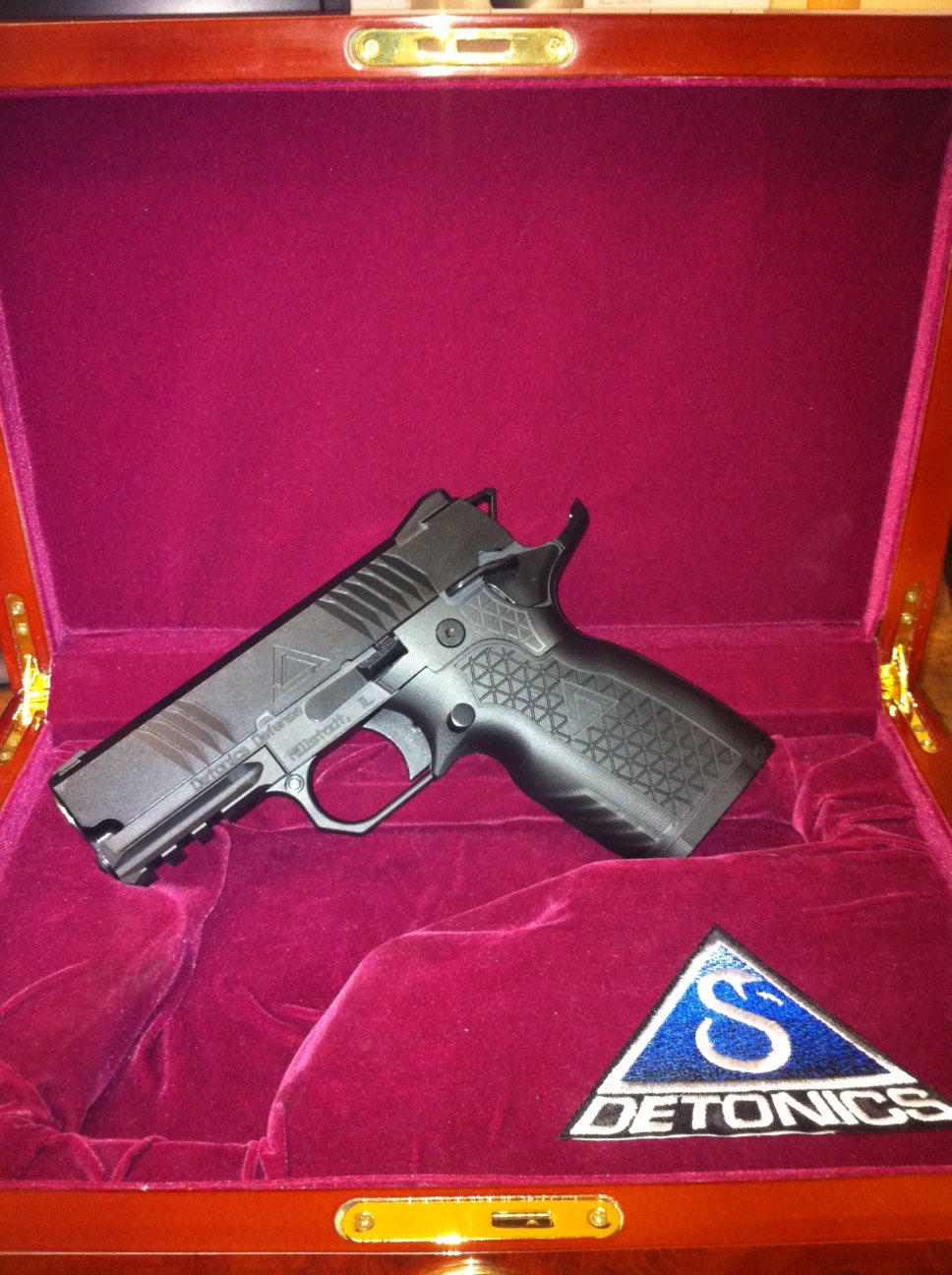
Detonics MTX
