= Kathleen O'Neal Gear =

American archaeologist and writer

- Born: 1954 (age 71–72); Tulare, California, U.S.
- Education: California State University, Bakersfield, Hebrew University of Jerusalem, California State University, Chico, University of California, Los Angeles
- Occupations: Archaeologist, writer
- Spouse: W. Michael Gear
- Writing career
- Notable work: North America's Forgotten Past series
- Website: www.gear-gear.com

Kathleen O'Neal Gear (born October 29, 1954) is an American archaeologist, historian, author. Her novels have been published in 29 languages.

== Biography ==
Gear was born in Tulare, California, and graduated with a B.A. from California State University, Bakersfield, then went on to do graduate work in archaeology at the Hebrew University of Jerusalem. She received her M.A. from California State University, Chico, and conducted Ph.D. studies in American Indian history at the University of California, Los Angeles.

Gear is a former state historian and archaeologist for Wyoming, Kansas, and Nebraska for the U.S. Department of the Interior. She is perhaps best known for the North America's Forgotten Past series, co-authored with her husband W. Michael Gear.

== Selected bibliography ==
- People of the Wolf (1990)
- People of the Fire (1990)
- People of the Earth (1992)
- People of the River (1992)
- People of the Sea (1993)
- People of the Lakes (1994)

== Awards and honors ==
- 2015 – inducted into the California State University, Bakersfield, Hall of Fame.
- 2021 – The Owen Wister Award for lifetime achievement in Western literature
- 2023 - Spur Award for Best Short Fiction of the Year for "No Quarter"
- 2023 - THE ICE GHOST awarded International Book Award for Best Young Adult Novel of the year.
- 2023 - inducted into the Colorado Authors' Hall of Fame.
