= Harlequin Enterprises =

Canadian book publisher of series romance and women's fiction

- Parent company: HarperCollins
- Founded: 1949; 77 years ago in Winnipeg, Manitoba
- Founder: Richard Bonnycastle; Jack Palmer; Doug Weld
- Country of origin: Canada
- Headquarters location: Toronto, Ontario
- Publication types: Books
- Fiction genres: Romance, action
- Imprints: Carina, Canary Street, Kimani, Love Inspired, Mira, Hanover Square, Park Row, Graydon House
- Revenue: $585 million
- Official website: www.harlequin.com

Harlequin Enterprises ULC (known simply as Harlequin) is a Canadian publisher of romance, women's fiction and various other genres under multiple publishing imprints. Founded in Winnipeg, Canada, in 1949, from the 1960s, it grew into the largest publisher of romance fiction in the world.

Based in Toronto since 1969, Harlequin was owned by the Torstar Corporation, the largest newspaper publisher in Canada, from 1981 to 2014. It was then purchased by News Corp and is now a division of HarperCollins. In 1971, Harlequin purchased the London-based publisher Mills & Boon Limited and began a global expansion program opening offices in Australia and major European markets such as Germany, France, Italy, Spain, Greece, Netherlands, and Scandinavia. Harlequin launched an audiobook program in 2015.

== History ==
=== Early years ===
Harlequin was founded in 1949 by Richard Bonnycastle in Winnipeg, Manitoba, as a paperback reprinting company. He founded the business while working at Winnipeg's Advocate Printers, a branch of Toronto's Bryant Press, as a way to keep the presses busy.

The business would be owned by Advocate Printers, Doug Weld of Bryant Press, and Jack Palmer, head of the Canadian distributor of the Saturday Evening Post and the Ladies' Home Journal. Palmer oversaw marketing for the new company and Bonnycastle took charge of the production.

Harlequin released its first book, Nancy Bruff's The Manatee, in May 1949. In the beginning, Harlequin typically acquired rights from various other publishers, though a few original books were published as well. Among the novels they reprinted were works by James Hadley Chase, Agatha Christie, Sir Arthur Conan Doyle, and Somerset Maugham. Their biggest success was Jean Plaidy's Beyond the Blue Mountain (1951). Of the 30,000 copies sold, only 48 were returned.

Although the new company had strong sales in its nascent years, profit margins were limited, and the operation struggled to stay solvent. Following the death of Palmer in the mid-1950s, Bonnycastle acquired his 25% interest in Harlequin. With the company still struggling to survive, soon Weld departed and Bonnycastle, now in full control, transferred Weld's shares to secretary Ruth Palmour.

In 1954, the company's chief editor died, and Bonnycastle's wife, Mary, began proofreading books at home and took over his duties. Mary enjoyed reading the romances of British publisher Mills & Boon, and, at her urging, in 1957 Harlequin acquired the North American distribution rights to the category romance novels which had been published by Mills & Boon in the British Commonwealth.

The first Mills & Boon novel to be reprinted by Harlequin was Anne Vinton's The Hospital in Buwambo (Mills & Boon No 407).

=== Mills & Boon partnership ===
The contract with Mills & Boon was based solely on a handshake, given each year when Richard Bonnycastle visited London. He would lunch at the Ritz Hotel with Editorial Director Alan Boon, the son of Gerald Mills, co-founder of Mills & Boon. The two would informally agree to extend their business agreement for an additional year.

Mary Bonnycastle and her daughter Judy Burgess exercised editorial control over which Mills & Boon novels were reprinted by Harlequin. They had a "decency code" and rejected more sexually-explicit material that Mills & Boon submitted for reprinting. Upon realizing the genre was popular, Richard finally decided to read a romance novel. He chose one of the more explicit novels and enjoyed it. On his orders, the company conducted a market test with the novel he had read and discovered that it outsold a similar, tamer novel. Overall, intimacy in the novels never extended beyond a chaste kiss between the protagonists.

The romances proved to be hugely popular, and by 1964 the company was exclusively publishing Mills & Boon novels under the Harlequin imprint. Although Harlequin had the rights to distribute the Mills & Boon books throughout North America, in 1967 over 78% of their sales took place in Canada, where the sell-through rate was approximately 85%. Richard Bonnycastle died in 1968 and his son, Richard Bonnycastle Jr., took over the company. He immediately organized the 1969 relocation of operations to Toronto, Ontario, where he built the company into a major force in the publishing industry. In 1970, Bonnycastle Jr. contracted with Pocket Books and Simon & Schuster to distribute Harlequin romance fiction novels in the United States.

On October 1, 1971, Harlequin purchased Mills & Boon. This move was made primarily to secure the talents of Alan Boon and his editorial team. John Boon, another of the co-founder's sons, remained with the company as Managing Director overseeing British operations and English language exports to markets around the world, including Australia, India and South Africa.

As North American booksellers were reluctant to stock mass-market paperbacks, Harlequin chose to sell its books "where the women are," distributing them in supermarkets, drug stores and other retail outlets. The company focuses on selling the line of books as a brand name, rather than individual titles. Headed by Larry Heisey, the marketing team modelled its techniques on those of Procter & Gamble. As well as selling through retail outlets, Harlequin established a direct marketing division taking as its inspiration the systems used by Reader's Digest. Rather than traditional advertising, the company focused on giveaways. A sampling of books within a line would be given away, sometimes in conjunction with other products, in the hopes that readers would continue to buy books within that line. Harlequin Reader Service sold directly to readers who agreed to purchase a set number of books each month.

At the time that Harlequin purchased Mills & Boon, the company only published one line of category romances. The Harlequin Romance line released six novels each month. At John Boon's urging, in 1973 Harlequin introduced a second line named Harlequin Presents. Designed partially to highlight three popular and prolific authors, Anne Hampson, Anne Mather, and Violet Winspear, these novels were slightly more sensual than their Harlequin Romance counterparts. Although Mary Bonnycastle disapproved of the more sensual nature of these novels, they had sold well in Great Britain, and the company chose to distribute them in North America as well. Within two years Harlequin Presents novels were outselling Harlequin Romance.

In late 1975 Toronto Star Ltd. acquired a 52.5% interest in Harlequin, and in 1981 acquired the balance of the shares.

=== Romance wars ===
By 1975, 70% of Harlequin's sales came from the United States. Despite this fact, the company contracted with only British writers. Harlequin contracted its first American author in late 1975 when they purchased a novel by Janet Dailey. Dailey's novels provided the romance genre's "first look at heroines, heroes and courtships that take place in America, with American sensibilities, assumptions, history, and most of all, settings." Harlequin was unsure how the market would react to this new type of romance, and was unwilling to fully embrace it. In the late 1970s, a Harlequin editor rejected a manuscript by Nora Roberts, who has since become the top-selling romance author, because "they already had their American writer."

Silhouette Books logo

Harlequin terminated its distribution contract with Simon & Schuster and Pocket Books in 1976. This left Simon & Schuster with a large sales force and no product. To fill this gap, and to take advantage of the untapped talent of the American writers Harlequin had rejected, Simon & Schuster formed Silhouette Books in 1980. Silhouette published several lines of category romance, and encouraged their writers to experiment within the genre, creating new kinds of heroes and heroines and addressing contemporary social issues.

Realizing their mistake, Harlequin launched their own line of America-focused romances in 1980. The Harlequin Superromance line was the first of its lines to originate in North America instead of in Britain. The novels were similar to the Harlequin Presents books, but were longer and featured American settings and American characters.

Harlequin had also failed to adapt quickly to the signs that readers appreciated novels with more explicit sex scenes, and in 1980 several publishers entered the category romance market to fill that gap. That year Dell launched Candlelight Ecstasy, the first line to waive the requirement that heroines be virginal. By the end of 1983, sales for the Candlelight Ecstasy line totaled $30 million. Silhouette also launched similar lines, Desire and Special Edition, each of which had a 90–100% sellout rate each month. The sudden increase in category romance lines meant an equally sudden increase in demand for writers of the new style of romance novel. By 1984, the market was saturated with category lines and readers had begun to complain of redundancy in plots. The following year, the "dampening effect of the high level of redundancy associated with series romances was evident in the decreased number of titles being read per month." Harlequin's return rate, which had been less than 25% in 1978 when it was the primary provider of category romance, swelled to 60%.

In 1984, Harlequin purchased Silhouette from Simon & Schuster. Despite the acquisition, Silhouette continued to retain editorial control and to publish various lines under their own imprint. Eight years later, Harlequin attempted to purchase Zebra, but the deal did not go through. Despite the loss of Zebra, Harlequin maintained an 85% share of the North American category romance market in 1992.

=== International expansion ===
Torstar Corporation, which owns Canada's largest daily newspaper, the Toronto Star, purchased Harlequin in 1981 and began actively expanding into other markets. Although the authors of Harlequin novels universally share English as a first language, each Harlequin office functions independently in deciding which books to publish, edit, translate, and print, "to ensure maximum adaptability to the particulars of their respective markets."

Harlequin began expanding into other parts of Europe in 1974, when it entered into a distribution agreement with Cora Verlag, a division of German publisher Axel Springer AG. The companies signed a two-year agreement to release two Mills & Boon novels each month in magazine format. The books sold well, and when the agreement came up for renewal Harlequin instead purchased a 50% interest in Cora Verlag. The new joint venture format allowed Harlequin to receive more of the profits, and allowed them to gain continued distribution in Austria, Switzerland, and West Germany. As of 1998, Germany represented 40% of Harlequin's total European business.

During this same period, Harlequin opened an office in the Netherlands. Although this office lost money in its first year, by its third year in business it had accumulated a profit. In 1979, the company expanded in Scandinavia with an office in Stockholm. Expansion was rapid in both Finland and Norway. Within two years of its opening Harlequin held 24% of the market for mass-market books in Sweden. Scandinavia offered unique problems however, as booksellers refused to sell the category romances, complaining that the books' short life span of one month created too much work for too little compensation. Booksellers and distributors also worried that the uniformity of Harlequin's book covers made advertising too difficult. Instead, Harlequin novels in Scandinavia are classified as magazines and sold in supermarkets, at newsstands, or through subscription. Harlequin retains their North American-style direct marketing. Its message in Scandinavia is very similar to that of North America, but its target audience differs slightly.

The 1989 fall of the Berlin Wall gave Harlequin an opportunity to extend into previously closed markets. Cora Verlag distributed over 720,000 romance novels at border checkpoints to introduce East Germans to the company's books. The same year, Harlequin's German joint venture began distributing books in Hungary. By 1991 the company was selling 7 million romances in Hungary, and by 1992 Harlequin had sold 11 million books in a nation which, at the time, contained only 5.5 million women. At the same time, Harlequin's wholly owned subsidiary in Poland was able to order initial print runs of 174,000 copies of each title, and the Czech Republic was purchasing over $10 million in Harlequin novels each year. In 1992, Harlequin had its best year (as of 1998), selling over 205 million novels in 24 languages on 6 continents. The company released a total of 800 new titles in English, with 6,600 foreign editions.

Harlequin moved into the Chinese market in January 1995. In China, the company produced books in both Mandarin and English. Twenty titles were offered each year in Mandarin, with print runs of 550,000 copies each. An additional ten titles were offered in English, with print runs of 200,000 copies each.

== International editions ==
In total, Harlequin has offices in Amsterdam, Athens, Budapest, Granges-Pacot, Hamburg, London, Madrid, Milan, New York, Paris, Stockholm, Sydney, Tokyo, and Warsaw as well as licensing agreements in nine other countries.

The editors in Harlequin's branch offices have a great deal of control over which Harlequin novels will be published in their market. An editor generally chooses a book after either reading it personally, receiving a favorable review of the book from someone else, or reading a tip sheet about the novel. The editors accept a novel for one of four reasons:

- Anticipated high sales
- Perceived quality
- A setting or topic that fits into a monthly theme
- Direct orders from the Harlequin head office

The novels published overseas are not necessarily contemporaries of those sold in North America or Europe. International editors are allowed to choose from Harlequin's backlist, and books published in a particular country may have been published in North America six or seven years previously. As the novels are translated into the country's native tongue, the names of the hero or heroine may be changed and the title might not be translated literally. Furthermore, each novel is usually shortened by 10-15% from its original English version. This is usually accomplished by removing references to American pop culture, removing puns that do not translate well, and tightening the descriptive passages.

== Current ==
As of 2024, Harlequin had published over 40,000 romance novels and sold over 131,000,000 copies, just under half of all romances released in North America.In 2024, Harlequin published books in 29 languages in 107 international markets. Their sales of 131 million books are similar to the company's sales in 2005.

The company is considered one of the most profitable publishers. Over $585 million worth of books sold in 2003 for gross profits of $124 million and a profit margin of 21%. Its large profit margin can be tied in part to the amount of advance that its authors receive. These advances are often smaller than the industry average and can total to only a few thousand dollars for a series romance. Despite its profitability, and a 37.2% pay hike for Harlequin President and CEO Donna Hayes in 2011, the firm's royalty program for authors is controversial. In 2011, the Romance Writers Association sent a letter to all members to "exercise due diligence in reviewing contracts" with Harlequin because "several members of RWA have expressed concern regarding" Harlequin's digital royalty rate changes and non-compete clauses. This is not the first time Harlequin had been called out by the Romance Writers Association regarding Harlequin's treatment of their authors. In 2009, Harlequin was called out by the Mystery Writer's Association, Romance Writers of America, and Science Fiction Writers Association for schemes of making their authors pay for publishing.

In late 2025 the French division of Harper Collins announced that it had engaged the company Fluent Planet to create AI translations of its romance novels into French in order to save costs and maintain low prices. The translations would then be checked for errors by human freelance editors before publication. The Association of France's Literary Translators (ATLF) and a collective of translators En Chair et en OS (In the Flesh) have voiced objections based on both quality and the negative effect on their member's income.

=== Class action lawsuit ===
In 2012, a class action lawsuit was filed against Harlequin Enterprises, Ltd. from authors alleging the publisher had fraudulently licensed e-book publishing rights at low rates to one of its subsidiaries in order to pay royalties only on the licensing fees instead of on the full sales receipts; the publisher responded that its authors "have been recompensed fairly and properly".

The lawsuit alleges that Harlequin deprives plaintiffs and the other authors in the class of e-book royalties due them under publishing agreements entered into between 1990 and 2004.

== Imprints ==
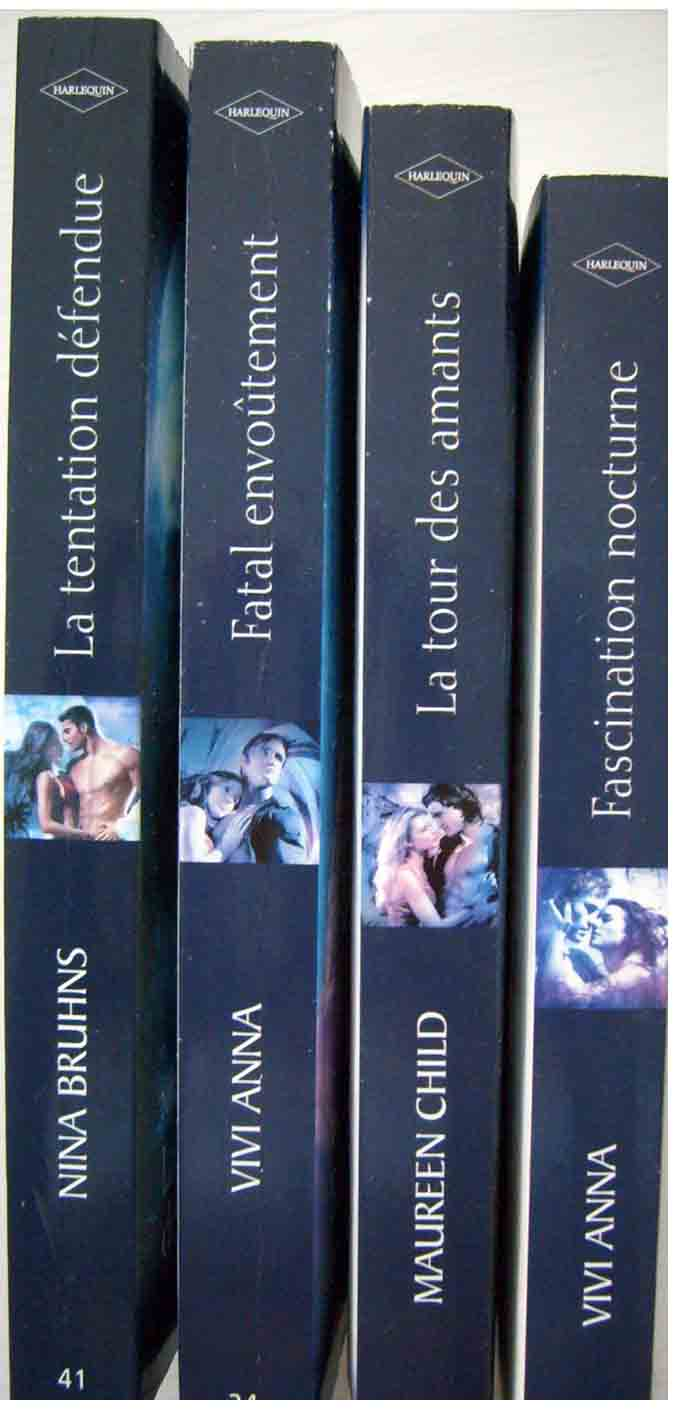
Harlequin Nocturne series

=== Harlequin ===
Name	Description
Harlequin American Romance	American protagonists and settings. Four titles released per month. Re-released as Harlequin Treasury Harlequin American Romance 90s.
Harlequin Blaze	Erotica. Imprint was ended in 2017 and superseded by Harlequin Dare. As of March 2022 Harlequin Dare has been ended and Harlequin Blaze is releasing four titles per month.
Harlequin Dare	Erotica; four titles released per month. Launched in 2017. Defunct as of June 2021.
Harlequin Desire	Wealthy and successful American protagonist-focused. Six titles released per month
Harlequin Duets	Defunct. Re-released as Harlequin Treasury Harlequin Duets 90s collection.
Harlequin E	
Harlequin Everlasting Love	Defunct
Harlequin Flipside	Defunct as of 2004
Harlequin Ginger Blossom	Defunct romance manga reprints. Formerly Harlequin Violet
Harlequin Heartwarming	Wholesome family- and community-focused plots. Four titles released per month
Harlequin Historical	Historical romance. Six titles released per month. Included Harlequin Historical Undone. Only distributed outside of the United States as of 2004. In February 2026, Harlequin confirmed it will discontinue Harlequin Historical in the fall of 2027.
Harlequin Intrigue	Romantic suspense. Six titles released per month
Harlequin KISS	Flirty first-encounter contemporary romances. Four titles released per month.
Harlequin Love And Laughter	Defunct. Re-released as the Harlequin Treasury Harlequin Love & Laughter 90s collection.
Harlequin Medical Romance	Medical-focused protagonists and plots. Six titles released per month.
Harlequin Mystique	1977-1982
Harlequin NEXT	Launched in 2005. Defunct.
Harlequin Nocturne	Paranormal romance. Two titles released per month. Includes Harlequin Nocturne Cravings series.
Harlequin Nonfiction	
Harlequin Presents	Glamorous and wealth-based plots that often feature "alpha male" protagonists. Eight titles released per month. Includes Harlequin Presents Extra erotica series.
Harlequin Romance	Uplifting, feel-good plots. Four titles released per month
Harlequin Romantic Suspense	Romantic suspense. Four titles released per month
Harlequin Signature Select	Defunct. Harlequin/Silhouette imprint.
Harlequin Special Edition	Relatable protagonists. Six titles released per month
Harlequin Special Releases	
Harlequin Superromance	Emotional plots with happy endings. Four titles released per month
Harlequin Temptation	Only distributed outside of the United States as of 2004.
Harlequin Treasury	
Harlequin Western Romance	Westerns and cowboy protagonists. Four titles released per month.

==== Harlequin Treasury collections ====
The Harlequin Treasury imprint re-released a number of titles as collections.

- Harlequin Treasury Harlequin American Romance 90s
- Harlequin Treasury Harlequin Duets 90s
- Harlequin Treasury Harlequin Historical 90s
- Harlequin Treasury Harlequin Intrigue 90s
- Harlequin Treasury Harlequin Love & Laughter 90s
- Harlequin Treasury Harlequin Presents 90s
- Harlequin Treasury Harlequin Romance 90s
- Harlequin Treasury Harlequin Superromance 90s
- Harlequin Treasury Harlequin Temptation 90s
- Harlequin Treasury Love Inspired 90s
- Harlequin Treasury Silhouette Desire 90s
- Harlequin Treasury Silhouette Intimate Moments 90s
- Harlequin Treasury Silhouette Romance 90s
- Harlequin Treasury Silhouette Special Edition 90s
- Harlequin Treasury Silhouette Yours Truly 90s

=== Kimani Press ===
Kimani Press, which focuses on African-American protagonists, was formed by Harlequin in December 2005, with the purchase of the Arabesque, Sepia, and New Spirit Imprints from BET Books.

Name	Description
Kimani Arabesque	"The soul of romance, passion, adventure and intrigue."
Kimani New Spirit	Defunct
Kimani Romance	These stories "feature sophisticated, soulful and sensual African-American and multicultural heroes and heroines who develop fulfilling relationships as they lead lives full of drama, glamour and passion."
Kimani Sepia	Defunct
Kimani Special Releases	
Kimani TRU	Young adult
Kimani Press	

=== Silhouette Books ===
Name	Description
Silhouette Bombshell	Launched 2004. Defunct.
Silhouette Desire	Defunct. Re-released as Harlequin Treasury Silhouette Desire 90s.
Silhouette Intimate Moments	Defunct. Re-released as Harlequin Treasury Silhouette Intimate Moments 90s.
Silhouette Nocturne	Defunct
Silhouette Romance	Defunct. Re-released as Harlequin Treasury Silhouette Romance 90s.
Silhouette Special Edition	Defunct. Re-released as Harlequin Treasury Silhouette Special Edition 90s.
Silhouette Special Releases	Defunct
Silhouette Yours Truly	Defunct. Re-released as Harlequin Treasury Silhouette Yours Truly 90s.

=== Love Inspired ===
Inspirational romance.

Name	Description
Love Inspired	
Love Inspired Classics	
Love Inspired Cold Case	
Love Inspired Historical	Historical fiction
Love Inspired Inspirational Romance	
Love Inspired Mountain Rescue	
Love Inspired Novels	
Love Inspired Special Releases	
Love Inspired Suspense	Romantic suspense

=== Other ===
Name	Description
Carina Press	
Carina Adores	LGBTQ+ romance
Canary Street Press	Absorbed by MIRA in 2025
DellArte Press	2009-2015
Gold Eagle	Defunct as of 2014
Graydon House	Defunct as of 2025
Hanover Square Press	crime, thrillers, high-concept fiction, narrative history, journalism. memoir
Heartsong Presents	
Canary Street	Formerly HQN, launched 2004
Inkyard Press	Formerly Harlequin TEEN, defunct as of 2023
LUNA	2004–2017
MIRA Books	
Park Row Books	
Red Dress Ink	2004–2014
Rogue Angel	Defunct
Spice	Defunct; now published under HQN. Included Spice Briefs (defunct).
Worldwide Library	
Worldwide Mystery	
Worldwide Suspense	

==== MIRA Books ====
In the early 1990s, many of Harlequin's authors began leaving the company to write single-title romances for other publishers. To retain their top talent, in October 1994 Harlequin launched the MIRA Books imprint to publish single-title romances. Most of their early novels were written by well-known Harlequin authors, including Heather Graham Pozzessere, whose novel Slow Burn (2001) launched the imprint. For its first few years, MIRA produced four novels each month. Of these, one would be an original novel, while the other three were repackaged backlist by other Harlequin authors.

Harlequin has expanded its range of books, offering everything from romance novels under its various Harlequin and Silhouette imprints; thrillers and commercial literary fiction under the MIRA imprint; erotic fiction under the Spice imprint; Bridget Jones-style "chick lit" under its Red Dress Ink imprint; fantasy books under the LUNA imprint; inspirational fiction published under the Steeple Hill and Steeple Hill Café imprints; African-American romance under its Kimani Press imprints; male action-adventure books under Gold Eagle imprint; and single-title romances under the Canary Street imprint.

==== Harlequin Horizons/DellArte Press ====
In 2009, Harlequin Enterprises announced the creation of a vanity press imprint, Harlequin Horizons.

The Mystery Writers of America, Romance Writers of America, and Science Fiction Writers of America denounced the move and revoked the eligibility of Harlequin's other imprints for their associations' conferences and awards. Following the backlash, the imprint changed its name to DellArte Press.

== Harlequin More Than Words ==
Harlequin Enterprises operates Harlequin More Than Words, a community investment program to reward women's work in communities across North America. The company solicits nominations of women who are making notable contributions to their communities. Five women are chosen as Harlequin More Than Words award recipients each year, and a donation of $50,000 is divided equally among their charitable causes. A collection of romance-fiction short stories inspired by their lives is then written by five of Harlequin's leading authors. Authors contributing to the More Than Words anthology include Diana Palmer, Debbie Macomber, Susan Wiggs, and Linda Lael Miller. The first anthology was published in 2004, with a new volume published annually. Proceeds from the sale of the book are reinvested in the Harlequin More Than Words program.

== See also ==
- List of Harlequin Romance novels
- Laser Books
- Lawrence Heisey
