= W. Michael Gear =

American writer and archaeologist

- Born: William Michael Gear; May 20, 1955 (age 71); Colorado Springs, Colorado
- Education: Colorado State University
- Occupations: Archaeologist, writer
- Spouse: Kathleen O'Neal Gear
- Writing career
- Notable work: North America's Forgotten Past series
- Website: www.gear-gear.com

William Michael Gear, better known as W. Michael Gear, (born May 20, 1955) is an American writer and archaeologist. He is the author of North America's Forgotten Past series, co-written with his wife Kathleen O'Neal Gear. His novels have been published in 29 languages.

== Biography ==
Gear was born in Colorado Springs, Colorado. He received his B.A. (1976) and M.A. (1979) from Colorado State University. Upon completion of his Master's in physical anthropology he went to work for Western Wyoming College in Rock Springs, Wyoming as a field archaeologist.

Gear currently resides in Wyoming along with his wife and co-writer Kathleen.

== Selected bibliography ==
- Requiem for the Conqueror (1991)
- Relic of Empire (1992)
- North America's Forgotten Past series
  - People of the Wolf (1990)
  - People of the Fire (1990)
  - People of the Earth (1992)
  - People of the River (1992)
  - People of the Sea (1993)
  - People of the Lakes (1994)
- The Warriors of Spider (1988)
- Dark Inheritance (2001) (with Kathleen O'Neal Gear)
