= North America's Forgotten Past =

Series of historical fiction novels

North America's Forgotten Past (occasionally called "First North Americans") is a series of historical fiction novels published by Tor and written by husband and wife co-authors W. Michael Gear and Kathleen O'Neal Gear. The series, which began with 1990's People of the Wolf, explores various civilizations and cultures in prehistoric North America. It is somewhat comparable to Jean M. Auel's Earth's Children series, which is set in prehistoric Europe, but each of its books focuses on a different time period, location, and set of characters. The first four novels form a coherent, more or less linear narrative, from the initial migration of Siberian peoples into what is now Canada and Alaska (People of the Wolf) through the florescence of the Mississippian semi-urban mound-building culture, considered the "high-water mark" of North American pre-Columbian civilization, around 1000 AD. The remaining novels cover a wide variety of times and settings, most standalone stories in no particular order, ranging from tropical Florida in the 6th millennium BC to the Chaco Empire of the Southwest in the 13th century AD. The novels take into account new developments in North American archaeology such as the discovery of Kennewick Man and the development of the coastal-route model as a possible alternative or supplement to overland migration across Beringia.

The novels generally have a prologue set in modern times, in which archaeologists or others discover ancient artifacts and other remnants of prehistoric North American civilization. The main body of the novel then details the individual lives of those who left the artifacts behind. Although generally well regarded for their accuracy and attention to detail (both of the writers are professional archaeologists) the novels usually contain mystic elements, focusing on shamanistic visions. Protagonists of early novels sometimes appear as dream guides or figures of legend in subsequent volumes.

According to the author's website, future titles in the series will include novels dealing with the Pacific Northwest in British Columbia; the high cultures of the Southeast, including Moundville, Alabama, and the Etowah Indian Mounds, Georgia; the Hohokam in southern Arizona; the Mimbres in New Mexico; and the Salado in the Salt River basin.

== Novels in order of publication ==
- People of the Wolf (1990)
- People of the Fire (1990)
- People of the Earth (1992)
- People of the River (1992)
- People of the Sea (1993)
- People of the Lakes (1994)
- People of the Lightning (1995)
- People of the Silence (1996)
- People of the Mist (1997)
- People of the Masks (1998)
- People of the Owl (2003)
- People of the Raven (2004)
- People of the Moon (2005)
- People of the Nightland (2007)
- People of the Weeping Eye (2008)
- People of the Thunder (2009)
- People of the Longhouse (2010)
- The Dawn Country (2011)
- The Broken Land (2012)
- People of the Black Sun (2012)
- "Copper Falcon" (2014)--short story
- People of the Morning Star (2014)
- "The Dead Man's Doll" (2015)--short story
- People of the Song Trail (2015)
- Sun Born (2016)
- Moon Hunt (2017)
- Star Path (2019)
- People of the Canyons (2020)
- Lightning Shell (2022)

== Novels in historical order ==
- People of the Wolf (13,000 BC): The initial migration of Siberian hunters across Beringia and into Alaska.
- People of the Nightland (13,000 BC): The melting of the glaciers in southern Ontario
- People of the Raven (9,000 BC): A speculative fictional account of Kennewick Man, an apparent Caucasoid male who lived in the Pacific Northwest.
- People of the Sea (8,000 BC): The initial development of California Native American culture, as a result of climatic warming.
- People of the Fire (8,000 BC): The transition of Native American culture from Paleo-Indian to Archaic, as a result of sudden climatic warming, in the High Plains and Western Rockies region.
- People of the Lightning (7,000 BC): The travails of an albino youth in Early Archaic Florida.
- People of the Earth (5,000 BC): Plains and Basins region.
- People of the Owl (1,500 BC): The Poverty Point semi-urban culture in the lower Mississippi Valley.
- People of the Lakes (100 AD): The journey of a band of Hopewell Indians across the Great Lakes.
- People of the Song Trail (980 AD): The first contact between Native Americans and Vikings.
- People of the Masks (1000 AD): Iroquois culture of the Woodland period.
- People of the River (1080 AD): The mound-building Cahokia empire on the Mississippi River.
- People of the Morning Star, Sun Born, Moon Hunt, Star Path, Lightning Shell (1100 AD): A tetralogy set in the Cahokian empire.
- People of the Silence (1130 AD): The decline of the Chaco Empire of the Southwest.
- People of the Moon (1150 AD): The collapse of the Chaco Empire's frontier, from the perspective of a subject people in what is now southern Colorado.
- People of the Canyons (1300 AD): The Fremont culture in Utah, Colorado, Arizona, and New Mexico.
- People of the Mist (1200 AD): A murder mystery set among the Algonquian people of the Chesapeake Bay region.
- People of the Weeping Eye and People of the Thunder (1200 AD): The mound-building culture around Moundville, Alabama.
- People of the Longhouse, The Dawn Country, The Broken Land, and People of the Black Sun (1400 AD): Conflict within the Iroquois nation in New England and New York.

== Novels ==
=== People of the Wolf ===
People of the Wolf (ISBN 0-8125-0737-1), the first book in the series, the story explores the migration of humans into pre-historic North America. The story starts with a woman being raped on the sea side. She gives birth to twins who are destined to change the history of the People. The novel follows two clans as they make way to new lands during the Ice age. Spurred by a vision he had while on a hunt, a young tribesman named Runs in Light, later called Wolf Dreamer, leads a handful of tribes people, in rebellion against the tribal shaman, south down the Yukon River valley into what is now Canada and the Pacific Northwest.

=== People of the Fire ===
People of the Fire (ISBN 978-0-8125-2150-4, 1991) dramatizes the transition of Native American culture from Paleo-Indian to Archaic as a result of climatic warming, set in the High Plains and Western Rockies region. It is the second book in North America's Forgotten Past series.

Amid disastrous climate changes, the Red Hand and Short Buffalo tribes struggle for survival, and against each other. In order to survive in the changing world, they must change with it, but to do that, they need the guidance of a new Dreamer, and the Red Hand's sacred Wolf Bundle must be renewed.

=== People of the Sea ===
People of the Sea (ISBN 0-8125-0737-1) dramatizes the initial development of the California Native American culture and the imminent extinction of mammoths and mastodons as a result of climatic warming ca. 8000 BC. It is the fifth book in the series.

=== People of the Lakes ===
People of the Lakes (ISBN 9780812507478) is the sixth book in the series. The title is a reference to the location and type of natives portrayed in the book, following the naming convention set forth by previous books in the series.

The book is set in the North American continent during the Iron Age (c. 100 CE) and follows the plight of a group of natives trying to save their clan from a great evil and avoid a rival clan. Clan fighting over a powerful totemic mask has brought the Mound Builder people of the Great Lakes region to the edge of destruction. It is up to Star Shell, daughter of a Hopewell chief, to rid her people of this curse. Along with her companions: Otter, a trader; Pearl, a runaway; and Green Spider, either prophet or madman, she braves the stormy waters of the lakes to reach the majestic waterfall known as Roaring Water. She is determined to banish the mask forever to a watery grave. But vengeful clan members are close on her heels, and they have a similar fate planned for her.

==== Main characters ====
Little Dancer/Fire Dancer: A young man of the Red Hand raised in a village of the Short Buffalo People, Little Dancer struggles to understand and come to grips with his emerging shamanic Power. He later becomes Fire Dancer after said Power comes into full bloom.

Two Smokes: An aging Two-Spirit who helps raise Little Dancer while seeking to glean a new food source in light of the dwindling numbers of buffalo.

Elk Charm: The love-interest of Little Dancer, she leaves the Red Hand camp after completing her first menstruation, fearing ambush and rape by Blood Bear.

Tanager: An independent-minded Red Hand warrior-woman amazingly skilled in battle. She is renowned for her ability to outrun men, to evade flying war-darts (spears launched by means of an atlatl) and her ferocity in battle.

Blood Bear: Ferocious war-leader of the Red Hand who becomes Keeper of the Wolf Bundle after reclaiming it from the Short Buffalo People, but shows no respect to the sacred object in private. He is revealed to be Little Dancer's biological father.

Heavy Beaver: Chief of the Short Buffalo tribe who uses false Dreams to obtain power for himself. Heavy Beaver suffers greatly from an Oedipus complex, struggling to prove his worth to the memory of his dead mother.

White Calf: The ancient medicine woman who teaches Little Dancer to harness his Dreams.

== Recurring terms ==
- Dreamer: When capitalized ("Dreamer" instead of "dreamer"), refers to a shaman, or one who possesses the talent for shamanic visions.
- Dream: Also called a Power Dream, refers to a shamanic vision (differentiated from ordinary REM sleep by means of capitalization).
- Power: When capitalized, refers to things in and of the spirit world, magic, Dreaming, etc.
- dart: A spear launched by means of an atlatl, in common use prior to the invention of the bow and arrow in North America. "War darts" are darts intended specifically for killing humans in war-time, as opposed to buffalo or mammoths or other prey animals of ancient North America.
- Wolf Dreamer/First Man: The main protagonist of the first book, who becomes a figure of legend in subsequent books. The further "ahead" the books go, the more the alteration effect of oral history becomes apparent.
- First Woman: Though her name is never mentioned, it is assumed that her true name is Heron, who helped Wolf Dreamer in the first novel. She appears in subsequent novels as a loner spirit who lives in a cave, fickle.
- the One: Refers to the belief that all life is one life, but viewed from many perspectives. To touch the One is a state of Zen-like self-transcendence where a Dreamer is at his or her most Powerful.

== First edition covers ==
People of the Wolf

People of the Fire

People of the Lakes

People of the Sea
