= Mistborn: Secret History =

2016 fantasy novella by Brandon Sanderson

- First edition cover
- Author: Brandon Sanderson
- Illustrator: Isaac Stewart
- Cover artist: Miranda Meeks
- Language: English
- Series: Mistborn series
- Genre: Fantasy
- Published: 30 January 2016
- Publisher: Dragonsteel Entertainment
- Publication place: United States
- Media type: Ebook
- Pages: 151
- ISBN: 978-1-938570-12-4

Mistborn: Secret History is a fantasy novella (Note: The Internet Speculative Fiction Database considers it to be novel length due to having nearly 50,000 words. However, it is marketed specifically as a novella per the cover. See entry at ISFDB (archive).)) by American author Brandon Sanderson, written as a companion story to the original trilogy of the Mistborn series.

The novella follows the story of Kelsier from Mistborn: The Final Empire and concludes with the events of the last book in the original trilogy, The Hero of Ages.

== Conception ==
Sanderson published the novella, which was 12 years in the making, as an effort to tide fans over until the third book in The Stormlight Archive was published. The story was supposed to be a secret until published, but Amazon accidentally leaked the last few pages of The Bands of Mourning with the author's comments about the story in the novel's postscript. The author noted in a blog post that the novella contained huge spoilers for the original Mistborn trilogy as well as minor spoilers to The Bands of Mourning, warning readers that knowledge of the story's existence was in itself, a spoiler.

== Plot summary ==
After being killed by the Lord Ruler, Kelsier meets Preservation as he is about to pass on to the spiritual realm. Kelsier refuses to do so and races to the Well of Ascension at the heart of the Lord Ruler's palace, touching its power and thus anchoring himself to the world. Whilst trapped at the Well, he discovers another entity trapped there: Ruin, the counterpart to Preservation, who intends to destroy the world.

When Vin accidentally frees Ruin when she gives up the power at the Well, Kelsier is also released. With the world now under direct threat from Ruin, a dying Preservation tasks Kelsier to find help. Following Preservation's guidance, Kelsier meets two people from different worlds, Khriss and Nazh, who point him to a covert group known as the Ire (Eyree) as his only chance for aid.

Despite Ruin's dissuasion, Kelsier travels to the Ire's fortress. He discovers that they are planning to steal Preservation's powers once he dies by using a strange artifact. Kelsier dupes the group by posing as Ruin and steals the artifact for himself. When he returns to his world, Preservation tells him that he cannot pass on his powers to Vin because she has been spiked by Ruin. When Preservation finally dies, Kelsier takes up the power using the stolen artifact. Trying and failing to contact Vin because of Ruin's interference and his inexperience with Preservation's powers, Kelsier decides to instead travel to Urteau and succeeds in freeing Spook from Ruin's influence.

Under Kelsier's command, Spook sends a message to Vin about her spike and Ruin's influence on her. However, Ruin intercepts and kills the messenger using Marsh, Kelsier's brother, who is now under Ruin's control. They then witness Vin's battle and subsequent defeat at the hands of Marsh and the other Steel Inquisitors. With Ruin's rage loosening his control, Marsh manages to use the intercepted message as Kelsier secretly intended and removes Vin's earring spike. Kelsier gives up Preservation's power to Vin, who uses it to kill the other Steel Inquisitors - but she ascends before she can finish Marsh.

Kelsier realizes that Ruin's power is incomplete until he finds the Lord Ruler's hidden cache of atium. He watches the battle at the Pits of Hathsin and Elend Venture's death at Marsh's hands. With her husband's death, Vin sacrifices herself to kill Ruin. Kelsier's long-time friend, Sazed takes up the powers of both Preservation and Ruin, ascending as Harmony. Kelsier tearfully reunites with Vin and watches as she too chooses to pass on to the Afterlife with Elend. After Harmony remakes the world, Kelsier speaks to Spook and recruits his help in getting him a new "string" to the physical realm.

== Characters ==
- Kelsier: The famed Survivor of Hathsin, a half-skaa Mistborn who led a revolution against the Lord Ruler. At the novella's beginning, Kelsier is killed by the Lord Ruler but refuses to pass on to the Beyond, and instead becomes trapped in the Cognitive Realm, between the Physical and Spiritual realms.
- Preservation: A god force on Scadrial with powers that can preserve what already exists, but cannot destroy or create. Preservation is at constant war with its opposite Ruin, and has been slowly weakening and dying for centuries.
- Ruin: Preservation's opposite, a god force with powers of pure destruction. He is currently trapped at the Well of Ascension, but seeks to escape and bring an end to the world.
- Vin: A young, fierce mistborn who trained under Kelsier, and has an important role in deciding the world's fate.
- Lestibournes (Spook): A young tineye member of Kelsier's crew, who idolized Kelsier.
- Marsh: Kelsier's brother joined the Lord Ruler's Ministry of Inquisition to help spy on them. He was eventually turned into an Inquisitor.
- Sazed: A Terrisman friend of Kelsier, a Keeper who specializes in preserving religions.
- The Lord Ruler: A seemingly immortal being who rules the Final Empire, and has oppressed the people for a thousand years.
- Drifter/Cephandrius: also known as Hoid and Wit, A world-hopper who secretly enters Scadrial posing as a nobleman.
- Khriss: A worldhopper from Taldain who was researching the origins of the Cosmere. She plays her role as the main character in White Sand.
- Nazh: A worldhopper from Threnody who assists Khriss during her research.

== Release ==
Mistborn: Secret History was originally published 30 January 2016 by Dragonsteel Entertainment as an ebook. In November 2016, it was republished as part of Arcanum Unbounded by Tor Books.

== Critical reception ==
Tor.com (later known as Reactor) magazine noted that the novella was an unusual one for Sanderson since it contained "less action, and a lot more time-killing while waiting for action".
