= Mistborn: The Lost Metal =

2022 novel by Brandon Sanderson

- First edition cover
- Author: Brandon Sanderson
- Cover artist: Chris McGrath
- Language: English
- Series: Wax and Wayne, Mistborn
- Genre: Fantasy novel
- Published: November 15, 2022
- Publisher: Tor Books
- Publication place: United States
- Media type: Print (hardcover and paperback), audiobook, e-book
- Pages: 528 pp
- ISBN: 978-0-7653-9119-3
- OCLC: 0765391198
- Preceded by: Mistborn: The Bands of Mourning

Mistborn: The Lost Metal is an urban fantasy novel written by American author Brandon Sanderson. It was published on November 15, 2022, by Tor Books. It is the fourth and final book in the Wax and Wayne series and seventh in the Mistborn series. It is preceded by The Bands of Mourning in 2016 and is to be followed by a new trilogy, written after release of a novelization of the Cosmere graphic novel White Sand.

== Plot summary ==
Six years following The Bands of Mourning, Waxillium Ladrian has retired from his lawman career, and Wayne has become a full constable in Elendel law enforcement, serving under Marasi who has been promoted to detective. Wax, aided by his wife Steris (with whom he has two young children, Maxillium and Tindwyl), has become a prominent figure in Elendel politics, known as the 'Lawman Senator of the Roughs'. Since the discovery of the Southern Scadrials during the quest for the Bands of Mourning, diplomatic relations have been established with its most prominent nation, the Malwish Consortium. However, relations between the north and south remain tense, as do those between Elendel and its neighboring cities in the Basin. Despite Wax's and Steris' efforts, conflict escalates.

Wax's sister Telsin, the leader of the Set, a terrorist group working for Trell (actually a Shard of Adonalsium called Autonomy), plots to smuggle a magical equivalent of an atomic bomb into Elendel. Marasi goes on a mission with a mysterious group known as the Ghostbloods, led by Kelsier, to stop Autonomy's forces from invading the world. Meanwhile, Wax and Wayne go to confront Telsin at the Set's base, killing several Set members, but discover that the bomb is not there, and instead is on a ship headed for the city. Marasi stops enemies in time and disables their portal, preventing the invasion, while Wax reaches the boat with Wayne. The duo discover that the bomb can be defused, but the defuser will die in the process. Wayne sacrifices himself to both defuse the bomb and save Wax. Telsin's overloaded body dies upon Autonomy removing her influence.

In the aftermath, Kelsier and Harmony debate about whether Harmony should introduce technology to the people or not, and Wax lives happily with Steris and his children. The city honors Wayne by putting up a statue of him.

== Characters ==
- Waxillium "Wax" Ladrian: head of House Ladrian and a special constable and detective, Wax was once a lawman of the roughs and is now a senator. He is a Twinborn with the Allomantic ability to Push metals and the Feruchemical ability to increase or decrease his weight.
- Wayne: Wax's best friend, who is a constable in Elendel law enforcement and has the Allomantic ability to make speed bubbles, in which time speeds up inside, and the Feruchemical ability to store health in goldminds to heal quickly, in exchange for a period of poor health.
- Marasi Colms: A constable who is Steris' illegitimate half-sister, who is a Pulser, an Allomancer that can slow down time within a bubble, and uses her ability via grenades that stop time when thrown.
- Steris Harms: Wax's wife, whom he has two children with. She is Marasi's half-sister.
- Telsin Ladrian: Wax's sister, the leader of the Set, a terrorist group, who has become the avatar of Autonomy.
- Sazed / Harmony: A former Terrisman who ascended to become the god Harmony, who is in conflict with Autonomy.
- Kelsier: The Mistborn Survivor of Hathsin who leads the Ghostbloods. He was killed by the Lord Ruler in The Final Empire, but managed to stay as a "ghost" (cognitive shadow) and later bound his spirit to a body.
- Marsh / Ironeyes / Death: Kelsier's Inquisitor brother, who has become a mythical figure associated with death. Ironically, his Atium stash is all but gone and without it his life would end.

== Publication ==
In 2014, Sanderson revealed the tentative title of the fourth and final book of the Wax and Wayne series as The Lost Metal. It was initially planned to be released in 2018, but was subsequently moved to Fall 2019. Later, due to the release of the previously unplanned Skyward series, the publication date was further postponed to 2022. The first printing of the novel consists of 500,000 copies.

== Audiobook ==
An unabridged audiobook was released on the same day as the physical novel, published by Macmillan Audio. It is narrated by Michael Kramer, who has narrated many of Brandon Sanderson's Cosmere novels.

A 2-part GraphicAudio version (dramatized adaptation) of The Lost Metal was released between December 2022 and January 2023:

The Lost Metal [Dramatized Adaptation]
Part	Publication Date	Ref
1	7 December 2022	
2	26 January 2023	

== Reception ==
The Lost Metal debuted at #2 on the Combined Print and E-Book Fiction New York Times Best Seller list and #2 on the Hardcover Fiction New York Times Best Seller list. Kirkus Reviews called the novel a "fast-paced and entirely satisfying conclusion to Mistborn's second era," praising it as an "action-packed adventure" while dropping hints torwards the future of the Mistborn saga.

Lyndsey Luther and Ross Newberry of Tor.com wrote a review as in-character as Wax and Wayne. They called the story a "romp-roarin', steel-pushin', emotion-wrenchin' rail-car ride full a' surprises, laughs and tears" and said that "Sanderson bloke's right good at spinnin' a tale." They also praised the character growth and connections to other series.

Eric Lake of 17th Shard called it a "pretty good ending" and a "fun read" stating that it "does wrap up the things it needs to do to be a satisfying conclusion." He added that it had "extremely cool moments, fantastic character work, and some really killer Cosmere stuff." However, he criticized the plot and questioned how self-contained it was in regard to crossovers with other Cosmere series.
