= Mistborn =

Fantasy literature series by Brandon Sanderson

- Era One: The Final Empire (2006); The Well of Ascension (2007); The Hero of Ages (2008); Era Two (Wax and Wayne): The Alloy of Law (2011); Shadows of Self (2015); The Bands of Mourning (2016); The Lost Metal (2022); Era Three (Ghostbloods): Forthcoming
- Author: Brandon Sanderson
- Illustrator: Isaac Stewart
- Cover artist: Jon Foster; Chris McGrath; Miranda Meeks
- Country: United States
- Language: English
- Genre: High fantasy
- Publisher: Tor Books (US); Gollancz (UK)
- Published: July 2006 – present
- Media type: Print (hardcover, paperback and leatherbound), audiobook, e-book
- No. of books: 7, 1 novella

Mistborn is a series of epic fantasy novels by the American author Brandon Sanderson and published by Tor Books. The books follow a series of Allomancers, who are individuals who can consume metal to wield magical powers.

The books are organised into four eras with large time skips between, of which the first two are complete and the third is currently being written. The first era (published 2006-2008) is fantasy and chronicles the efforts of a secret group of Allomancers who attempt to overthrow a dystopian empire and establish themselves in a world covered by ash. The second (2011-2022) is a detective story set 300 years later, following the Lawmen Wax and Wayne in their efforts to undermine a criminal ring. The third series will be set in the early computer age with 1980s/1990s technology. The fourth series is planned to be a space-opera.

Mistborn has been a critical and commercial success, and has led to adaptations in other media, including tabletop gaming. It is part of Sanderson's Cosmere, an interconnected universe, and thus some elements from Mistborn have appeared in or influenced other stories.

== Books ==
#	Title	Words	Publication date
Era One
1	The Final Empire	212,417	July 17, 2006
2	The Well of Ascension	245,672	August 21, 2007
3	The Hero of Ages	235,114	October 14, 2008
	Secret History (novella)	50,000	January 26, 2016
Era Two (Wax and Wayne series)
4	The Alloy of Law	94,763	November 8, 2011
5	Shadows of Self	112,000	October 6, 2015
6	The Bands of Mourning	127,000	January 26, 2016
7	The Lost Metal	149,000	November 15, 2022

== Development history ==
=== Original trilogy (2006-2008) ===
Sanderson's first idea for Mistborn came while reading the Harry Potter series: He thought it would be interesting to set a story in a world where the "dark lord" triumphed and the "prophesied hero" failed. His second idea, originally unrelated, was to tell a heist story in a fantasy setting, an idea inspired by the Ocean's series. The idea for the titular mist came while he was driving through mist in Idaho, which he combined with his memories of having once seen Washington National Cathedral lit from the inside. He originally developed feruchemy and allomancy for separate stories before deciding to bring them together in one story.

Sanderson began work on what would become Mistborn: The Final Empire in the early 2000s, while trying to get Elantris published. Experiencing reluctance from publishers in taking on large books from unknown authors, he set out to produce shorter works and developed two in the same world, entitled Mistborn and The Final Empire. The first told the story of a Mistborn hiding out in a small village to avoid capture, while the second was a larger story involving a girl named Vin who attempted to overthrow the government. He referred to both of these works as "unpublishable", and moved on to Stormlight Archive, but they served as inspiration for his later work. Sanderson ultimately chose to delay publication of the first Stormlight book in favor of completing the Mistborn series, which he thought would serve as a better follow-up to Elantris. He published a trilogy of Mistborn books from 2006 to 2008.

=== Era Two (2011-2022) ===
By the late 2000s Sanderson envisioned a "trilogy of trilogies" for Mistborn, comprising nine books across three eras. A second trilogy was to be set in an urban setting, featuring modern technology, and the third trilogy was to be a science fiction series, set in the far future. However, Sanderson realised that with his work on Stormlight it would be a decade before he would be able to return to Mistborn, and began exploring a "stop-gap" work to be published during that period. He wrote and discarded a short story before developing The Alloy of Law (2011), set between the first and second trilogy. Set 300 years after The Hero of Ages, it introduced a western-like setting and early 20th century technology to the franchise.

The Alloy of Law was very well received and sold consistently over the long term. With this in mind Sanderson expanded the structure, and developed three sequels. This established four "Eras" for the planned series, with Alloy marking the start of the second. The sequels were published from 2015 to 2022, interspersed between Sanderson's work on Skyward and The Stormlight Archive. In addition to the Era Two works, Sanderson also published Secret History, an additional Era One novella. He described the story, which takes place concurrently with the original trilogy, as something that he had developed at the time and then refined over the years. The final Era Two book, The Lost Metal was substantially delayed by the previously unplanned Skyward series.

=== Future ===
Work on Era Three did not commence in earnest until after the completion of Wind and Truth in 2024. Sanderson has earmarked December 2028, 2029 and 2030 for the trilogy. As of December 2025, much of the first book has been written.

== Setting ==
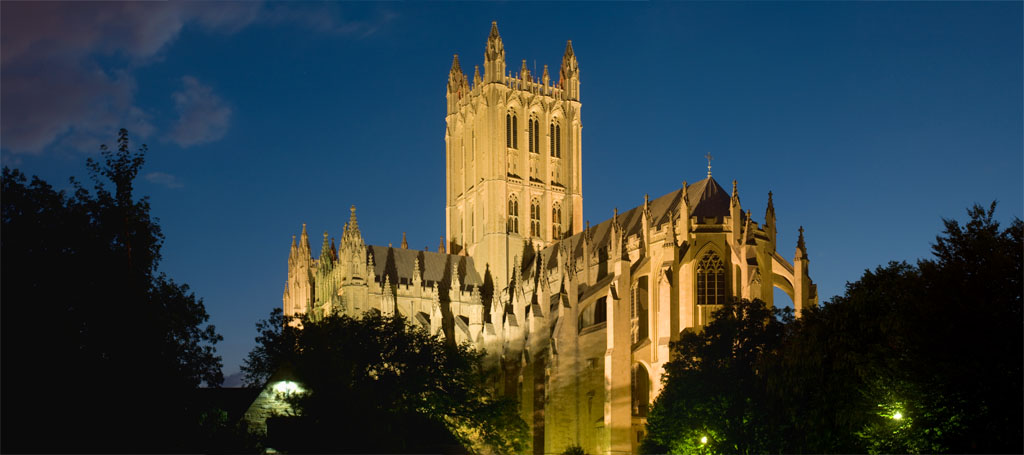
Keep Venture was inspired by the structure of Washington National Cathedral

Mistborn is set on the planet Scadrial. It is home to two gods, Preservation and Ruin, both of which are shards of an original deity named Adonalsium. The imbalance and relationship between these powers have shaped Scadrial into a borderline inhospitable place, with red sky, brown foliage and an unnatural thick mist that blankets the land each night. The only habitable regions of the planet are at the poles. The habitable North is organised into the Final Empire, an autocratic society dominated by an unaging emperor known as the Lord Ruler. The empire is also overseen by an extensive nobility; the distant descendants of the Lord Ruler's allies during the formation of the empire a thousand years earlier. Much of Era One takes place in and around the city of Luthadel, capital of the empire and home to the nobles' keeps as well as the Lord Ruler's sanctuary, Kredik Shaw.

By Era Two, set 300 years later, the planet has been greatly reshaped by an apocalyptic interaction of divine power known as the Catacendre. This has wildly adjusted the climate of the planet and resulted in a new god named Harmony. The former territory of the Final Empire has been replaced by a lush grassland of Harmony's creation named the Elendel Basin. More distant are the Roughs, which are less arable. On the far side of the planet, the world's south pole is inhabited by a distinct group of humans, who had been totally isolated until the improved climate and technology made interaction possible. These include the Malwish, an enigmatic advanced society that always wear masks.

== Magic ==
Scadrial is home to three magical disciplines: Allomancy, Feruchemy, and Hemalurgy. All three magic systems are based on metals, which are used by the Invested individual to grant them specific abilities. The series makes use of hard magic principles, and so all three disciplines have rigorously defined rules which are defined in the books' appendices.

=== Allomancy ===
In the Mistborn series, Allomancy is a predominantly genetic ability that allows a person to metabolize ("burn") metals, ingested by the Allomancer, for magical powers that can enhance physical and mental capacities. For example, by burning tin an Allomancer may improve their perceptive abilities, such as eyesight and hearing. There are 16 metals that such Allomancers can use, with each metal granting a specific ability. In addition to these, there are "god metals" with other effects. A Mistborn is able to use all 16 and a Misting may use a single one only.

Table of Allomantic Metals
physical	Pushing	Pulling	Pulling	Pushing	mental
External	Steel (Coinshot); Pushes on Nearby Metals	Iron (Lurcher); Pulls on Nearby Metals	Zinc (Rioter); Inflames Emotions	Brass (Soother); Dampens Emotions	External
Internal	Pewter (Thug or Pewterarm); Increases Physical Abilities	Tin (Tineye); Increases Physical Senses	Copper (Smoker); Hides Allomantic Pulses	Bronze (Seeker); Detects Allomantic Pulses	Internal
Internal	Duralumin (Duralumin Gnat); Enhances Current Metal Burned	Aluminium (Aluminium Gnat); Wipes Internal Allomantic Reserves	Gold (Augur); Reveals Your Past Self	Electrum (Oracle); Reveals Your Future	Internal
External	Nicrosil (Nicroburst); Enhances Allomantic Burn of Target	Chromium (Leecher); Wipes Allomantic Reserves of Target	Cadmium (Pulser); Slows Down Time	Bendalloy (Slider); Speeds Up Time	External
enhancement	Pushing	Pulling	Pulling	Pushing	temporal

=== Feruchemy ===
Feruchemy is a genetic ability found among the people of the Terris region. A person who can use only one Feruchemical metal is known as a Ferring, while those who can use them all are called Feruchemists. They use the same metals as Allomancers, but rather than ingesting them, the metals are worn, carried, or implanted. The metal is not consumed, instead acting like a battery to store a specific attribute for later retrieval. For example, a Feruchemist could store physical strength in a piece of pewter—making themselves weak for a time—to later tap that strength and become very powerful for a short period. Usually, only the Feruchemist who originally stored the attribute can use it. Beginning in Era Two, interbreeding has introduced Twinborn, who possess a single Allomantic power as well as a single Feruchemical power.

Table of Feruchemical Metals
physical		cognitive	
Iron (Skimmer); Stores weight	Steel (Steelrunner); Stores physical speed	Zinc (Sparker); Stores mental speed	Brass (Firesoul); Stores warmth
Pewter (Brute); Stores physical strength	Tin (Windwhisper); Stores physical senses	Copper (Archivist); Stores memories	Bronze (Sentry); Stores wakefulness
Chromium (Spinner); Stores Fortune	Nicrosil (Soulbearer); Stores Investiture	Cadmium (Gasper); Stores breath	Bendalloy (Subsumer); Stores energy
Aluminium (Trueself); Stores Identity	Duralumin (Connector); Stores Connection	Gold (Bloodmaker); Stores health	Electrum (Pinnacle); Stores determination
spiritual		hybrid	

=== Hemalurgy ===
Hemalurgy allows the transfer of Allomantic and Feruchemical powers from one person to another, though with a net loss of power. It is done by driving metal spikes through the body of the power donor, and then permanently impaling these in the receiver's body in specific bind points. These spikes may pierce key organs without killing the host; notably the Steel Inquisitors of Era One had large spikes driven through their eye sockets.

physical	Pushing	Pulling	Pulling	Pushing	mental
External	Steel steals Physical Allomancy	Iron steals physical strength	Zinc steals emotional fortitude	Brass steals cognitive Feruchemy	External
Internal	Pewter steals Physical Feruchemy	Tin steals senses	Copper steals mental fortitude, memory, and intelligence	Bronze steals Mental Allomancy	Internal
Internal	Duralumin steals Connection and Identity	Aluminium removes all powers	Gold steals hybrid Feruchemy	Electrum steals Enhancement Allomancy	Internal
External	Nicrosil steals Investiture	Chromium might steal destiny	Cadmium steals Temporal Allomancy	Bendalloy steals Spiritual Feruchemy	External
enhancement	Pushing	Pulling	Pulling	Pushing	temporal

== In other media ==
=== Role-playing game ===
In early 2009, Sanderson announced he was working with Crafty Games to release a role-playing game based on the series. While the release date was originally placed as "sometime in 2009", it shifted multiple times before being released in December 2011 in PDF, softcover, and hardcover editions.

In 2024, Brotherwise Games and Dragonsteel Entertainment announced the Cosmere Roleplaying Game, with a Mistborn campaign setting expected to be released in Fall 2026.

=== Film ===
In 2010, Sanderson optioned the rights to the Mistborn books to Paloppa Pictures LLC. In Q1 of 2014 Paloppa Pictures' option ran out. In October 2016, the rights to the entire Cosmere universe, including the Mistborn series, were licensed by DMG Entertainment. On January 27, 2017, Deadline Hollywood reported that DMG signed F. Scott Frazier as the screenwriter for the adaptation of Mistborn: The Final Empire. On March 5, 2020, Sanderson stated that he was currently writing the screenplay of Mistborn: The Final Empire. Later, on December 19, 2023, Sanderson stated that the film's development had encountered "hiccups" and was on "pause for now".

In January 2026, it was announced that Apple TV had secured the rights for Sanderson's entire Cosmere universe, and that Mistborn in particular would be adapted as feature films. As of July 2026 Sanderson has reported that the first draft of the screenplay has been completed .

=== Video games ===
In March 2012, a video game prequel called Mistborn: Birthright was announced slated for a fall 2013 release. The game had been delayed until 2015 to take advantage of the PlayStation 4 and Xbox One and then delayed again to Fall 2016. Sanderson said in a November 2016 Q&A that Mistborn: Birthright is "dead". Developed by Little Orbit, Sanderson had written the story of the game. On July 24, 2017, an official cancellation of the game was posted by the CEO of Little Orbit, Matthew Scott, on Facebook.

On May 27, 2021, it was announced that Mistborn would cross over with Fortnite. Later that day, Kelsier was released in the item shop for purchase, bundled with other items from the Mistborn universe.

=== Board game ===
In 2016, a kickstarter campaign raised funds for a board game centered on the Mistborn series called Mistborn: House War. Developed by Crafty Games and designed by Kevin Wilson, House War is the first board game set in the Mistborn world and takes players on an adventure to play the role of leaders of the great noble Houses, struggling to weather the cataclysmic events of the first novel of the series. The game started shipping to backers in late August 2017. In 2018, a digital version of the boardgame was published on Tabletopia.

Crafty Games also released an expansion for Mistborn: House War called Mistborn: The Siege of Luthadel, in which players take the role of factions attacking or defending Luthadel during the events of the second novel.

=== Deck-building game ===
In 2024, Brotherwise Games released Mistborn: The Deckbuilding Game.

James Austin of The New York Times reviewed the game favorably, saying that it was enjoyable and thematic, but opined that it was not a good beginner card game, because it is more complex than simpler games such as Dominion.

=== Audio adaptations ===
A full-cast audio adaptation of the entire series has been produced by American audiobook company GraphicAudio since 2014.

== Reception ==
Forbes magazine praises all of the books in the Mistborn series, saying that "the narrative is crafted with such bloody precision, it's nearly impossible to put the books down".
