= Gentlemen's agreement (disambiguation) =

A gentleman's agreement is an informal agreement.

It may also refer to:

- Gentlemen's Agreement of 1907 between the United States and Japan
- Gentlemen's Agreement of 1956 between leaders of the Andhra State and the Telangana region, leading to the formation of the state of Andhra Pradesh in India
- Gentleman's Agreement (novel)
- Gentleman's Agreement, the 1947 film adaptation, starring Gregory Peck and Dorothy McGuire
- A Gentleman's Agreement, a 1918 silent film
- Gentlemen's Agreement (film), a 1935 British film
- Gentleman's Agreement (album), a 1983 jazz album by George Adams and Dannie Richmond
- Gentlemen's Agreement (Spycraft), a collection of adventures for the role-playing game Spycraft
