= Vater (album) =

Studio album by Janus
- Released: (Germany) 1998
- Genre: electronic, gothic rock, industrial
- Length: 49:53
- Label: Trisol Records (Germany)
- Producer: Janus

Janus chronology
Vater (1998)	Schlafende Hunde (2000)

Vater is the first studio album by electronic band Janus. It was released in 1998 on Trisol Records. The album was re-released (self-released) as Vater Deluxe in 2006, with bonus tracks.

== Track listing ==
1. "Isaak"–6:02
2. "Schwarzer Witwer"–9:02
3. "Lolita / Knochenhaus"–10:32
4. "Exodus"–3:06
5. "Saitenspiel"–6:30
6. "Der Flüsterer im Dunkeln"–9:45
7. "Dreizehn Bestien"–5:36

== Info ==
- All tracks written and produced by Janus
- Vocals by Dirk Riegert
- Programming and piano by Tobias Hahn
