= Stargate SG-1 (roleplaying game) =

Tabletop role-playing game

- Stargate SG-1 Roleplaying Game cover
- Designers: Robert Defendi, Scott Gearin, Patrick Kapera, Don Mappin, Christina Kamnikar, Rodney Thompson, Kevin Wilson
- Publishers: Alderac Entertainment Group
- Publication: 2003
- Genres: Licensed science fiction
- Systems: Spycraft (d20 System)

Stargate: SG-1 Roleplaying Game is a role-playing game based on the TV series Stargate SG-1, released in 2003 by Alderac Entertainment Group. The game, based on AEG's Spycraft, uses the d20 System. Since Sony did not renew AEG's contract to publish the game, it is now out of print.

== History ==
The Stargate SG:1 RPG (2003) by Alderac Entertainment Group followed their publication of the Spycraft d20 espionage game, and was designed to be fully compatible with the first edition of Spycraft. Season guides and additional supplements for Stargate SG:1 were published until MGM pulled their license from AEG; thus, the RPG only adapted material from the first two seasons of the series.

== Core rulebook ==
The core Stargate SG-1 role-playing book is a hardbound and full-color 488 page volume. The content includes:

- Summaries of episodes aired during the television show's first six seasons
- Information on planet previously visited by SG-1
- Information regarding Stargate Command and the Cheyenne Mountain Complex
- Information regarding Goa'uld types, history, biology and psychology
- Skills, feats, and gear
- Advice for Game Masters on building worlds to visit, races to encounter, and adventure construction

== Supplements ==
- Fantastic Frontiers (2003) and Friends and Foes (2004), detailing the first two seasons of the series
- Living Gods (2004), concerning Goa'uld System Lords
- First Steps (2004), a collection of original worlds and adventures.

== Reception ==
SciFi.com gave the Stargate SG-1 Roleplaying Game an A−.

== Reviews ==
- Pyramid
- Backstab #45
