= Spycraft (role-playing game) =

Tabletop role-playing game

- Spycraft Roleplaying Game (2nd edition) cover
- Designers: Patrick Kapera, Scott Gearin, Alex Flagg, Kevin Wilson
- Publishers: Alderac Entertainment Group, Crafty Games
- Publication: 2002 (Classic Spycraft); 2005 (Spycraft 2.0)
- Genres: Espionage, Action
- Systems: d20 System (variant) (Classic Spycraft); OGL (Spycraft 2.0)

Spycraft is a d20 and OGL-based role-playing game dealing with superspies and modern action. Originally published by the Alderac Entertainment Group (AEG), it is currently published under licence by Crafty Games.

== History ==
Originally envisioned—and initially publicised—as a paranormal superspy game called Series Archer, the game was split into 2 complementary product lines: Spycraft (silver trade dress) which devoted itself to a generic cinematic superspy/action setting, and Shadowforce Archer (black trade dress) which featured a setting focused on a global shadow conspiracy based on a wide variety of supernatural elements. After the release of the core book (subsequently referred to as the Spycraft Espionage Handbook) in 2002, multiple print supplements were released in the following years for both lines. Each of these books sported highly distinctive cover art by artist Veronica V. Jones.

A new edition of the rules, Spycraft 2.0, was released in August 2005. Shortly afterwards, economic issues forced AEG to cull Spycraft from its product range. As a result, early in 2006 the core authors of the second edition – Alex Flagg, Scott Gearin and Patrick Kapera (who also co-authored Spycraft 1.0)) – formed Crafty Games to continue the line under licence, predominantly through PDF file releases supported by strategic print releases. This model has changed over time, permitting a growing number of print releases including compilations of previous PDF releases. During this time Crafty Games began referring to Spycraft 1.0 as Classic Spycraft.

=== Awards and nominations ===
==== Classic Spycraft ====
- ENnie (Nominee for Best d20 Game, 2002)
- Outie (Best New RPG, 2002)
- Pen & Paper (Best Graphic Design Runner-Up, 2002)
- Pen & Paper (Best RPG Runner-Up, 2002)
- Grog d'Or (Best RPG Nominee, 2003)

==== Spycraft 2.0 ====
- Outie (Best Retread, 2005)
- Diana Jones (Nominee for Excellence in Gaming, 2006)
- ENnie (Nominee for Best d20 or OGL Product, 2006)
- ENnie (Nominee for Best Game, 2006)
- ENnie (Nominee for Best Product, 2006)
- ENnie (Nominee for Best Rules, 2006)

== System ==
=== Classic Spycraft ===
Spycraft Roleplaying Game (Classic Spycraft) cover

Classic Spycraft is a d20 System game, implementing a number of changes to the core mechanics in order to give a more contemporary feel:

- The system used the Vitality/Wound Point system originated in the Star Wars d20 RPG.
- Races were replaced by Departments. The mechanic would later evolve into the slightly more simulist meta-Departments before then being used to model non-humans.
- Characters gained both a Defense and Initiative bonus which improved with their character levels, while armor instead adds damage resistance rather than add to defense (Armor Class).
- Modern day skills like Computers and Electronics were added to the skill list. Characters in Spycraft can also critically succeed or critically fail at skill checks.
- A system for resolving high-speed chases was included in the main rulebook (and expanded somewhat in later supplements). The system involves both sides of the chase picking maneuvers with specific game effects and then rolling a contest of skill to determine which takes effect. The system was later used by the d20 conversion of White Wolf Publishing's Aeonverse games.
- Characters kept a certain amount of personal gear, but the gear would be replaced by the Agency the characters worked for when lost. Characters also received additional gear for each mission based on the threat level code of the mission (White, Yellow, Red, or Black).
- Characters received a number of "Action Dice" based on their character level (and feat selection) for each play session. These Action Dice would be used during play to add to die rolls or to activate a critical success (or critical failure on the part of your opponents). The Game Control (Spycraft's term for a Game Master) also received a number of Action Dice to use for his NPCs, and could award the players (and himself) additional Action Dice for particularly good play.

=== Spycraft 2.0 ===
Spycraft 2.0 took these changes a step further and was released under the Open Game Licence (OGL), but not the d20 System Trademark License. There were also numerous changes from Classic Spycraft, such as:

- New character options, including Wealth and Interests, help flesh out characters more effectively.
- Plug-and-play modifications called Campaign Qualities that allow characters to advance in some skills and abilities faster at the expense of others that slow down by the same rate. Other Campaign Qualities have more general effects, such as defining the campaign as taking place in a specific time period, or making combat more of a danger.
- Each character chooses an Origin at character creation. Unlike Dungeons & Dragons's Race mechanic and Classic Spycraft's Departments, Origins consist of two parts which allow players to choose an almost unending variety of character benefits and detriments.
- The skills system has been reworked. The d20 System skill list has been replaced by a new list. Each skill has a variety of codified checks that that skill can perform. The skills rules more rigorously detail matters that were often left to group contract in other d20 System games.
- A redesigned gear system that simplifies one of the more unwieldy parts of Classic Spycraft. Budget and Gear Points have been replaced with Common Items, and a number of Gear Picks based on a character's class and gadgets can now be designed freeform style.
- Vehicular chases have been expanded into a new rules mechanic called Dramatic Conflicts. The one system covers chases, seduction, hacking and other dramatic events.
- Mission and NPC creation have been redesigned, and are now crafted to give a set amount of XP based on their ability instead of using Challenge Ratings. This simplifies mission creation.

== Campaign settings ==
=== Classic Spycraft ===
==== Shadowforce Archer ====
Shadowforce Archer was the first of all the Spycraft campaign settings. The world of Shadowforce Archer (SFA) is an Earth where mystical and psionic powers are real. A series of supplemental books that were released to support the SFA worldbook. Each book details one of the international Chambers of the world. Each book has a different theme and includes new rules and agent options appropriate to the theme. The setting was discontinued at the beginning of 2005. Spycraft 2.0 contains many classes and feats that first appeared in the SFA line.

The Shadowforce Archer World Book has recently been re-released in PDF format by Crafty Games. The rest of the SFA line will also be made available in PDF format throughout the rest of the year (and possibly into the next).

- Archer Foundation Chamber Book [AEG1001]: Details the continent of Australia and the South Pacific region. The theme is super-espionage, conspiracy and paranoia and is an expansion and continuation of the plot and events in the main worldbook.
- Pan-Asian Collective Chamber Book [AEG1005]: Details the continent of Asia and the Pacific Rim. The themes are Martial Arts fighting, Anime-style high tech, and hard-boiled Hong Kong action.
- European Commonwealth Chamber Book [AEG1006]: Details the continent of Europe. The themes are techno-thriller, suspense, and double-crosses.
- African Alliance Chamber Book [AEG1007]: Details the continent of Africa. The themes are action, adventure, misdirection, and mystery.

==== Dark Inheritance ====
Released in 2004 by Mythic Dreams Studios, Dark Inheritance (DI) was originally a d20 Modern campaign setting but converted across to the Powered by Spycraft banner using the Classic Spycraft rules. It describes an Earth that has been ravaged by ancient mystical powers, allowing Demons and other foul beasts access to this dimension. The setting book contains new rules that allow agents to play as Titans (powerful descendants of antediluvian demi-gods), worship the demonic forces and gain access to mystic powers (reprinted from the SFA world book).

There are a number of supplements planned for DI, similar in fashion to those for SFA. There is no release date as yet for any of these supplements.

=== Spycraft 2.0 ===
==== World On Fire ====
Released in December 2007, World On Fire is the title of the world book that covers the setting detailed in the Spycraft CCG. Agents are able to fight the forces of evil alongside such groups as the Shadow Patriots and Banshee.Net. The book features even more character options (in the form of new origins, base and expert classes, and new master classes for higher level characters). New classes include the Ace, the Centurion, the Edgemaster, the Fixer, the Forward, the Goliath, the High Roller, the Martial Artist, the Medic, the Menace, the Mole, the Ninja, the Provocateur, the Saboteur, the Spin Doctor, the Street Knight, and the Terrorist.

==== Fantasy Craft ====
Fantasy Craft was released in both hardcover and PDF formats in 2009 through the Flaming Cobra imprint of Mongoose Publishing. Following Crafty Games' parting with Mongoose, a soft-covered second printing incorporating the errata generated up to that point was released in 2010.

Originally the game was intended for release as an expansion of the Spycraft 2.0 ruleset, following up the first two Origin of the Species electronic products that added character creation options for a variety of standard fantasy and classical Greek non-humans to the ruleset. During the development process, the decision was made by Crafty Games to instead take the opportunity to significantly streamline the game mechanics in response to user feedback and create the ruleset referred to as Mastercraft. This permitted the release of Fantasy Craft as a standalone product under the Open Gaming Licence, including full rules for character generation, conversion mechanics for monsters found in the System Resource Document, and the tools for creating, populating and presenting user-generated campaign settings to players.

Fantasy Craft was nominated in 2010 for an Origins award for best RPG and an ENnie for Best Writing; it also received an honorable mention at that year's ENnies for Product of the Year.

2010 also saw two further Fantasy Craft soft-covered print products, both of which reprinted previously electronically published material. The first was Time of High Adventure, which compiled the previously published "The Darkest Hour" and "Cleansing of Black Spur" and added a third original mission as well as a chapter expanding upon the implied setting of all three modules. This was followed up by the Adventure Companion, which contained 3 campaign settings originally intended for release as part of the core book before being cut for space, and a fourth chapter offering a number of new game mechanic options, including a compilation of the non-spellcasting "Call to Arms" character class releases, some additional classes and a small library of additional specialities, feats and tricks.

A fourth print release titled Spellbound is currently slated for publication. In addition to compiling the spellcasting "Call to Arms" character class releases, its content is focused on greatly expanding the mechanical and narrative options for magic use in a Fantasy Craft game.

==== Ten Thousand Bullets ====
Long teased on the Spycraft forums under the name 'Project X', Ten Thousand Bullets is a gritty crime setting intended to bring Spycraft down to street level with new rules to allow players to become police, gangsters and everything in between. Originally intended for release at Gen Con Indy 2007, the creative process behind Fantasy Craft has resulted in its being slated for release as a Mastercraft title.

== Organized play ==
Spycraft has a long history with organized play and living campaigns. For 5 years Spycraft could be played as part of the Living Spycraft campaign, which was a part of the RPGA (Role Playing Game Association) network of Living Campaign settings.

The Living Spycraft campaign had been in the planning stages for a while before RPGA approval was provided on 29 August 2002 with the campaign starting properly in October 2002 utilising the, then current, Classic Spycraft rules. In 2005 the campaign converted to the Spycraft 2.0 rules but, at the end of 2007, Crafty Games ended the campaign although the original campaign scenarios are still available as free downloads. A number of volunteers who ran the Living Spycraft campaign restarted it independently as Spymaster but this campaign ceased in 2010. Likewise, in 2008 a UK-only campaign, called For Queen & Country, started. This campaign utilises a version of Classic Spycraft that incorporates aspects of Spycraft 2.0.

== Supplements ==
=== Classic Spycraft ===
- Modern Arms Guide (AEG (print), Crafty Games (PDF))
- Gentlemen's Agreement (AEG (print), Crafty Games (PDF))
- Game Control Screen (AEG (print), Crafty Games (PDF))
- Soldier/Wheelman Class Guide (AEG (print), Crafty Games (PDF))
- Fixer/Pointman Class Guide (AEG (print), Crafty Games (PDF))
- Faceman/Snoop Class Guide (AEG (print), Crafty Games (PDF))
- The 1960s Decade Book (AEG (print), Crafty Games (PDF))
- Most Wanted (Paradigm Concepts (print))
- Agency (AEG (print), Crafty Games (PDF))
- Mastermind (AEG (print), Crafty Games (PDF))
- U.S. Militaries (AEG (print), Crafty Games (PDF))
- World Militaries (AEG (print), Crafty Games (PDF))
- Battlegrounds (AEG (print), Crafty Games (PDF))

Crafty Games has re-released the first edition books in PDF format. The first two PDF releases, the Spycraft Espionage Handbook and Shadowforce Archer came with a Conversion Document that allows owners to use the material with Spycraft 2.0.

=== Spycraft 2.0 ===
There are currently 28 supplements available for the new version of Spycraft (21 from Crafty Games and 6 licensed products).

- Agent X: Firebrand (Crafty Games (PDF))
- Agent X: One Man Army (Crafty Games (PDF))
- Agent X: The Runner (Crafty Games (PDF))
- Back to Basics: Modern SRD Classes for Spycraft (Crafty Games (PDF))
- Bag Full of Guns: Dragon's Fury (Crafty Games (PDF))
- Bag Full of Guns: Red Heat (Crafty Games (PDF))
- Bag Full of Guns: This is My Gun (Crafty Games (PDF))
- Bag Full of Guns: This is My Rifle (Crafty Games (PDF))
- The Big Score (Crafty Games (PDF))
- Black Knight Casino (Darkfuries (print))
- Combat Missions (Paradigm Concepts (print and PDF))
- Conspiracies (Paradigm Concepts (print and PDF))
- Fragile Minds (Crafty Games (PDF))
- Odd Jobs (Crafty Games (print))
- Operation: Nightfall (Crafty Games (PDF))
- Origin of the Species: Classic Fantasy (Crafty Games (PDF))
- Origin of the Species: Light of Olympus (Crafty Games (PDF))
- Origin of the Species: Transmechs (Crafty Games (PDF))
- Practice Makes Perfect (Crafty Games) (PDF)
- Real American H.E.R.O.es (Crafty Games) (PDF)
- Skyshark Stealth Helicopter (Fat Dragon Games) (PDF)
- Shadow Play (Crafty Games (print))
- Spellbound: The Channeler (Revised) (Crafty Games) (PDF)
- Spellbound: The Seer (Crafty Games (PDF))
- Spycraft 2.0 Game Control Screen (Crafty Games) (PDF)
- Twilight 2013 Shooter's Guide: Alternate Arms (93 Games Studios (PDF))
- Twilight 2013 Shooter's Guide: Pistol-Caliber Carbines (93 Games Studios (PDF))
- World on Fire (Crafty Games (print and PDF))

== See also ==
The Spycraft system was used in the Stargate SG-1 role-playing game. This has often been referred to as Spycraft 1.5 due to some small changes that were made to the Spycraft 1.0 rules and were subsequently incorporated into Spycraft 2.0, such as Gear Picks.

== Reviews ==
- Backstab #38
- Pyramid
