= Nisil =

Metal alloy of nickel and silicon

Nisil is an alloy of nickel (95.5% wt.) and silicon (4.4% wt.) with traces of Mg (0.1% wt.), which is non-magnetic.

Nisil melts at 1341 - 1420 °C, has a density of 8.58 g/cm^{3}, and electrical resistivity of 0.365 Ω⋅mm^{2}/m at 20 °C.

It is often used in conjunction with Nicrosil in type N thermocouples. In this use, it serves as the negative leg of the thermocouple. It offers higher thermoelectric stability in air above 1000°C (1830°F) and better oxidation resistance than type E, J and K thermocouples. It can not be exposed to sulphur-containing gases.
