= Auferstehung =

Studio album by Janus
- Released: (Germany) April 13, 2004
- Genres: Electronic music Gothic rock Industrial
- Length: 79:52
- Label: Trisol Records (Germany)
- Producer: Janus

Janus chronology
Auferstehung (2004)	Nachtmahr (2005)

Auferstehung (German for Resurrection) is the third full-length album of the German musical project Janus.

== Track listing ==
Disc 1:

1. "Wenn du vor mir stehst"–1:40
2. "Paulas Spiel"–5:15
3. "Ich will seinen Kopf"–4:49
4. "Scherbengesicht"–3:32
5. "Die Tage werden enger"–5:36
6. "Neunundachtzig"–4:00
7. "Überleben"–5:36
8. "Du siehst aus wie immer"–5:20
9. "Auferstehung"–9:53
10. "Paulas Traum"–5:35

Disc 2 (Kleine Ängste) (only in the limited edition):

1. "Kleine Ängste"-4:45
2. "Das Land unter dem Bett"-1:36
3. "Lemuren"-2:45
4. "Die Welt steht Kopf"-7:06
5. "Kinderaugen"-4:07
6. "Ein sicherer Ort"-2:59
7. "Die letzte Tür"-5:04

== Info ==
- All tracks written and produced by Janus
- Vocals by Dirk Riegert
- Programming and piano by Tobias Hahn
