= Little Fears =

Tabletop horror role-playing game by Jason L Blair

- Cover of Little Fears
- Designers: Jason L Blair
- Publishers: Key 20 Publishing
- Publication: 2001
- Genres: Horror
- Systems: Original
- Website: http://www.littlefears.com

Little Fears - The Roleplaying Game of Childhood Terror is a role-playing game published in 2001 by Key 20 Publishing. The book was written by Jason L Blair, featuring illustrations by Drew Baker, Dimitrios "Jim" Denaxas, Veronica V. Jones, hive, Nick Wilson, Kieran Yanner, Bradley K. McDevitt, and Julie Hoverson, and additional material by Seth A. Ben-Ezra, Greg Oliver, F. Scott Blair, and Shelby Mallow.

== Summary ==
In the game, players take on the personae of children, aged 6 to 12, who are being hunted by the minions of a place called Closetland. Closetland is ruled by the Demagogue and his Seven Kings. Each King is the personification of one of the seven deadly sins. The most well-known of the Kings is the Bogeyman, King of Greed. Other creatures include the Closet Monster, the Monster Under The Bed, werewolves, vampires, and much more.

The children are not entirely powerless: They have Belief, a special kind of magic that can turn the impossible into the real. Through Belief, pictures of deceased relatives can call forth their protective spirits while teddy bears can spring to life to defend children. Belief also has disadvantages: Stepping on a crack really can break your mother's back and mirrors really can capture souls.

A tenth anniversary edition of the original game was released in summer 2011. Titled Happy Birthday, Little Fears, it collects the original text, revised rules, author commentary, and all the official supplements into a single volume.

== Reviews ==
- Backstab #33

== Awards ==
Little Fears was nominated for an Origins Award as the Roleplaying Game of the Year in 2002. The book was nominated for and won the RPGnet Award for the Most Disturbing/Controversial Game of 2001.

== Foreign editions and expansions ==
Also in 2002, Little Fears was licensed by prominent German game publisher Feder & Schwert for release in the German language market. The German version, titled Kleine Ängste, inspired the industrial duo Janus to release a soundtrack. Packaged with a limited edition of Janus' studio release Auferstehung, the Kleine Ängste CD featured seven eerily haunting songs. Janus frontman RIG also released a German-language storybook inspired by Little Fears/Kleine Ängste which was limited to 666 copies. In it, RIG tells a story from the Little Fears universe.

Little Fears was also licensed by French publisher 7ème Cercle who released the French language edition of Little Fears (which retained its English title) in 2003. The game was illustrated entirely by the Peru brothers and featured a cover by Samuel Araya. 7ème Cercle also released a game screen for use in the game featuring an original mural by Stéphane et Olivier Peru.

The English edition of Little Fears went out of publication in 2004, after selling through its initial print run. The copyright to the work is held by Jason L Blair. Key 20 Publishing no longer has any Little Fears-related content on its website.

In 2006, an article announced the 2007 release of a new edition of Little Fears, called Little Fears: Nightmare Edition.

In January 2008, Jason L Blair issued a statement regarding his regret that the game had not been ready for publishing in the promised time frame, and that he "decided to step away from it for a bit to reevaluate the game, what I wanted from it and I what it needed to be."

== Novels ==
In January 2008, Blair said that he had written a young adult novel set in Little Fears called The Wolf Pact and that he was working on its sequel.

The completion of the first draft of Wolf Pact was announced in 2016, and the sequel's name was revealed to be Fairy Tale Ending.

== Little Fears Nightmare Edition ==
Blair released Little Fears Nightmare Edition in print and PDF on October 19, 2009. This version is a complete overhaul of the system and premise with some figures key to the original, such as the Demagogue and the Kings, being completely removed. Closetland remains as the source of the monsters and is better detailed than before. Tonally, the game is more focused on Goosebumps-style horror. The controversial elements were mostly removed. While the Kings were excised, some of them remained in name as regular monsters.

The game uses a dice engine called the Top 3 System which was built especially for the game.

== Products ==
=== Little Fears ===
Little Fears (corebook)
Needles & Chocolate (web-based)
The Rusted Swing (web-based)
When the Monsters Came (PDF)
Santa Claws (PDF)
Cry Havoc (PDF)
Dragon Hunting (PDF)

=== Little Fears Nightmare Edition ===
Little Fears Nightmare Edition (corebook) (PDF/Print)
Book 2: Among the Missing (rules/setting/character expansion)(PDF/Print)
Book 3: Blessed are the Children (rules/setting/character expansion)(PDF/Print)
Campfire Tales #1: Beggars Night (PDF)
Campfire Tales #2: The Fall Harvest (PDF)
Campfire Tales #3: The Longest Night of Your Life (PDF)
Campfire Tales #4: Death by Chocolate (PDF)
Campfire Tales #5: Dead Leaves (PDF)
Campfire Tales #6: Old Man Winter (PDF)
Campfire Tales #7: Camp Howling Wolf (PDF)
Goodie Bags #1: The Butterfly Knights (PDF)
Goodie Bags #2: Baba Yaga's Children (PDF)

=== Happy Birthday, Little Fears ===
Happy Birthday, Little Fears (corebook)

=== Little Fears: The Movie ===
Currently in development by Reactor 88 Studios. Jason L Blair is attached as the writer for the screenplay.
