= Janus (musical project) =

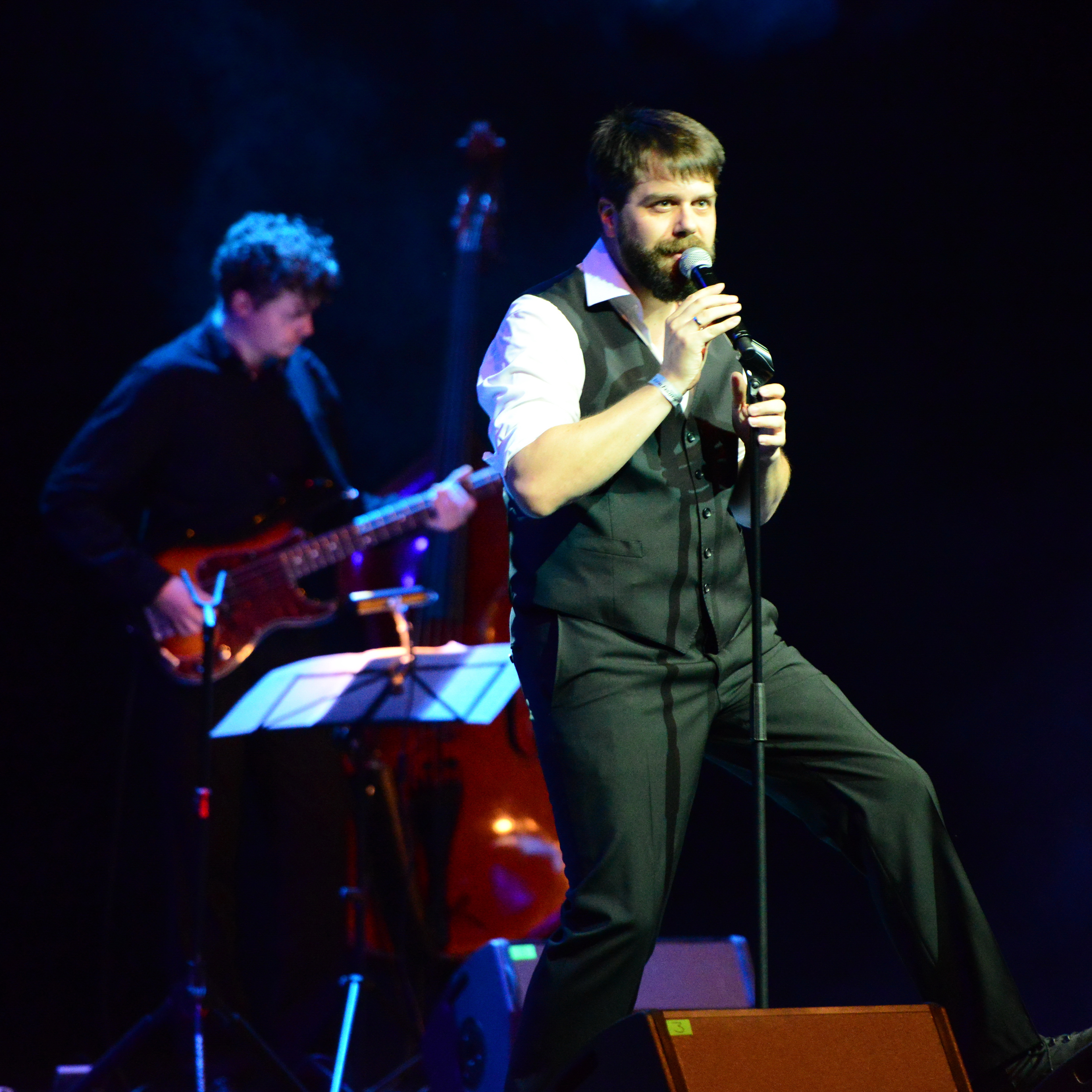
- Janus, Amphi festival 2014

Background information
- Origin: Germany
- Genres: Neue Deutsche Härte, electronic
- Years active: 1995–present
- Labels: Trisol
- Members: Dirk "Rig" Riegert; Tobias "Toby" Hahn
- Website: knochenhaus.de

Janus is a German musical project led by Dirk "Rig" Riegert and Tobias Hahn. The name comes from Roman mythology, specifically the god Janus, who ruled over gates and doors.

== History ==
From the beginning, Janus consisted of only two members - Dirk "Rig" Riegert, songwriter and vocalist, and Tobias "Toby" Hahn, programmer and piano player. Throughout their albums Janus has used many guest musicians, up to and including an entire orchestra.

Despite positive criticism, the debut album Vater failed to attract much attention. However, with further releases, Janus gained more popularity within the German alternative scene.

== Musical characteristics ==
The music style of Janus is not easy to define. It can be labeled as Neue Deutsche Härte with influences of drum and bass, trip hop, tango and film score elements.

Like the mythological god, Janus has two faces: aggressive electronic pieces, and ballads with acoustic instruments. In their concerts, Janus is often assisted by guest musicians, who can also be found on the albums, although they are not official members of the band.

Janus uses the German language to describe such human emotions as hate, despair, insanity, fear, and loss.

== Line-up ==
Members

- Dirk "Rig" Riegert - Vocals and lyrics
- Tobias "Toby" Hahn - Programming and piano

== Discography ==
=== Releases ===
- ????: Liebeslieder (first demo, under the name Rorschach)
- 1995: Schlafende Hunde (second demo, limited to 25 copies)
- 1997: Vater Demo (self-distributed, limited to 500 copies)
- 1998: Vater
- 1999: Isaak (MCD)
- 2000: Schlafende Hunde (see German Wikipedia article)
- 2001: Hundstage (EP)
- 2002: Winterreise (self-distributed, limited to 500 copies. With German-language covers of Hallelujah by Leonard Cohen and Disarm by Smashing Pumpkins)
- 2004: Auferstehung
- 2004: Kleine Ängste (only available on the limited edition of Auferstehung, inspired by the German version of the Little Fears RPG)
- 2004: Kleine Ängste (spoken word, self-distributed and limited to 666 copies)
- 2005: Live Bootleg DVD (self-distributed, limited to 400 copies. Footage from a concert in Leipzig)
- 2005: Nachtmahr
- 2005: Die Alpträume des Herrn Riegert (spoken word, only available on the limited edition of Nachtmahr)
- 2005: Live Bootleg DVD (self-distributed, limited to 400 copies. Footage from a concert in Koblenz)
- 2006: Vater Deluxe (self-distributed re-release of the first album Vater and bonus tracks from the Vater Demo)
- 2014: Schlafende Hunde Deluxe (self-distributed re-release of the album Schlafende Hunde and bonus tracks from the Hundstage EP)
- 2017: Ein Schwacher Trost

=== Compilation appearances ===
- Touched By The Hand Of Goth Volume IV – Saitenspiel
- Nachtschwärmer 3 – Rorschach
- Mondenblut 1 – Gescheitert
- Sonic Seducer Cold Hands Seduction Vol. XVII – Was uns zerbricht
- Dark Roses - 36 Mystic And Electropop Romantics – Isaak (Single Edit)
- Leichenschrei - Trisol Bible Chapter 2 - Kleine Ängste
- Orkus Presents The Best Of 2004 (Part 2) – Paulas Spiel
- Orkus Presents The Best Of 2005 - Grabenkrieg
