= Nicrosil =

Nickel alloy

Nicrosil is a nickel alloy containing about 14.4% chromium, 1.4% silicon, and (in some sources) 0.1% magnesium.

Nicrosil is used as the positive leg of type N thermocouples. In this application another nickel alloy, Nisil, is used as the negative leg. The Nicrosil alloy in this case does not contain magnesium.

Nicrosil makes an appearance in Brandon Sanderson's Mistborn books, where it is one of the sixteen Allomantic metals. When burned, it allows the user to enhance the effect of another Allomancer's metal burn, and as a Feruchemical metalmind it can store Investiture, the basis of magic within Sanderson's interconnected universe, the cosmere.
