= Gentlemen's Agreement (Spycraft) =

Collection of adventures for Spycraft RPG

- Cover art by Veronica V. Jones
- Designers: BD Flory
- Illustrators: Veronica V. Jones; Jonathan Hunt; Paul H. Way
- Publishers: Alderac Entertainment Group
- Publication: 2002
- Genres: Modern espionage RPG

Gentlemen's Agreement is a collection of adventures published by Alderac Entertainment Group (AEG) in 2002 for the modern-day espionage role-playing game Spycraft.

== Description ==
Gentlemen's Agreement presents four interconnected adventures — in Spycraft terms, a "season" — that feature a common enemy. A group of idle billionaires who call themselves The Board seek to push the world to the brink of destruction and chaos for their own amusement, before reversing course and saving humanity, receiving kudos from each other for having averted disaster. It has become a game of brinkmanship where each successive catastrophe pushes the world ever closer to the point of no return.

The four adventures are:

- "Ring of Fire": The player characters are pitted against Errol Richter, a new member of The Board, who seeks to trigger the simultaneous eruption of all the volcanoes surrounding the Pacific.
- "The Bull and the Bear": Board member Pluto Crassus seeks to destabilize the global stock market. This adventure reveals information to the players about The Board and the grand game its members are playing.
- "The Cold Days": This adventure is set in the 1960s and revolves around the Cuban Missile Crisis, which this adventure claims was started by the founding member of The Board, Nero Kingsley. Players can either keep the character they used in the first two adventures by temporarily changing the character's name or they can use a pre-generated character.
- "End Game": This adventure returns to the present. Nero Kingsley is dying of an inoperable brain tumor, and has decided to push the world towards ruin one last time by removing oxygen from the atmosphere, with no intention of saving it, taking humanity with him to the grave.

== Publication history ==
AEG published the modern-day espionage role-playing game Spycraft in 2002, and subsequently published several supplements and collections of adventures, one of those being Gentlemen's Agreement, a 96-page softcover book released in 2002 that was designed by BD Flory, with cover art by Veronica V. Jones and interior art by Jonathan Hunt and Paul H. Way.

== Reception ==
In Issue 43 of the French games magazine Backstab, Frédéric Romero noted "All of these adventures should remind you of Bond movies. But the last two adventures undoubtedly feature the best of the bad guys, the formidable Kingsley." Romero concluded, "Cool ideas. The PCs have their work cut out for them!"
