= Veronica V. Jones =

American artist

- Known for: Digital illustration

Veronica V. Jones is a commercial digital illustrator specializing in the fantasy and science fiction genres. She began her professional illustration career in 1997, and has since worked on a wide variety of role-playing, collectible card game and fantasy literature publications.

== Select published works ==
- Book covers, Spycraft 1.0 / Shadowforce Archer RPG
- Card illustrations, Legend of the Five Rings CCG
- Card illustrations, A Game of Thrones CCG
- Interior illustrations, Little Fears
- Cover and interior illustrations, Little Fears Nightmare Edition
