= Mistborn: The Bands of Mourning =

2016 novel by Brandon Sanderson

- First edition cover
- Author: Brandon Sanderson
- Illustrator: Isaac Stewart; Ben McSweeney
- Cover artist: Chris McGrath
- Language: English
- Series: Wax and Wayne, Mistborn
- Genre: Fantasy novel
- Published: January 26, 2016
- Publisher: Tor Books
- Publication place: United States
- Media type: Print (hardcover and paperback), audiobook, e-book
- Pages: 448 pp
- ISBN: 978-0-7653-7857-6
- OCLC: 948320987
- Dewey Decimal: 813/.6
- LC Class: PS3619.A533 B36 2016
- Preceded by: Mistborn: Shadows of Self
- Followed by: Mistborn: The Lost Metal

Mistborn: The Bands of Mourning is a steampunk fantasy novel written by American author Brandon Sanderson. It was published on January 26, 2016, by Tor Books and is the third book in the Wax and Wayne series and sixth in the Mistborn series. It is preceded by Shadows of Self in 2015 and followed by The Lost Metal in 2022.

== Plot summary ==
In a flashback, Waxillium Ladrian is spending a year in the Terris Village while he is a teenager. Unlike his sister Telsin, he struggles to adapt to their ways, and when he discovers and kills a Terris murderer whom the Terris failed to apprehend, he decides to depart the village. Years later, Wax has mostly emotionally recovered from Lessie's death, and is about to marry Steris. However, Wayne secretly sabotages the wedding so that it is unfinished.

A kandra named VenDell makes contact with Wax, seeking help on a mission, but when Wax refuses, VenDell recruits Marasi instead. Wax listens in as VenDell explains how another kandra, ReLuur, found evidence of the existence of the Bands of Mourning: the Lord Ruler's arm braces, which may be able to grant anyone the powers of an allomancer and a feruchemist. However, ReLuur was attacked by the Set and lost one of his spikes. Marasi agrees to hunt the spike, and Wax agrees to tag along when a picture reveals that his sister may be in New Seran, where ReLuur was ambushed. VenDell also says that Harmony has been preoccupied with something big lately.

Wax, Marasi, Wayne, Steris, and MeLaan make their way to New Seran under the guise of a diplomatic mission. Tensions have grown between Elendel and the outer cities, with a war possibly imminent. Marasi acquires a strange cubic device from bandits after she and Wax foil a train robbery. At New Seran, Wax attends a party held by prominent noblewoman Lady Kelesina Shores, after acquiring a strange coin and partially uncovering a conspiracy Kelesina is involved in. Kelesina contacts Wax's uncle Edwarn, who has Kelesina killed and frames Wax. Wax also discovers that his uncle was not actually present in the room, but speaking to Kelesina through a communication device, hinting at the Set having developed or found their own advanced technology. Steris proves useful at the party, both for the infiltration and the subsequent escape. Meanwhile, Wayne and Marasi raid a graveyard where they believe the spike to be, but cannot find it. They do learn, however, that there is a strange project going on in the nearby town of Dulsing, connected to the Set.

The group flees the city and heads for Dulsing. Marasi discovers that her cube can absorb and replicate Allomantic powers when thrown. At Dulsing, the group infiltrates a Set warehouse and discovers a massive, damaged warship, which the Set is both repairing and researching. Marasi recovers the spike and rescues a strange, imprisoned man who wears a wooden mask; she also finds evidence that other mask-wearing people have been tortured and murdered there. Wax rescues Telsin, but a shootout ensues. The masked man leads Marasi, Wax, and the others into a hidden compartment aboard the ship, which is actually a smaller ship hidden inside. The man reveals the ships are flying vehicles powered by Allomancy, and with Wax's power they use the vehicle to escape.

The man, Allik, uses a strange medallion to communicate with them; he reveals many of the medallions, which have the ability to grant a variety of Allomantic and Feruchemical abilities to anyone who wears them. He comes from a region beyond the Roughs that froze when Harmony remade the world, and claims that his people were then saved by the Lord Ruler, who reappeared with a spike through his right eye after Harmony's ascension. Allik and his people were also seeking the Bands of Mourning, which are hidden at a temple in a nearby mountain range, when they crashed and were taken by the Set. The group sets course for the temple, hoping they can reach it before Edwarn Ladrian and his expedition team do.

Wax's group find the temple and disable its traps, but cannot get through the final door. The Set expedition arrives, and Edwarn, under a banner of truce, opens the final door so that they may all enter. They find the temple empty, the Bands seemingly already taken. Telsin is revealed as a traitor and leader of the Set (even higher ranked than Edwarn), and she shoots Wax repeatedly; he falls into a pit trap. MeLaan is incapacitated, Wayne is forced to flee, and Steris, Allik, and Marasi are taken captive.

Wax crawls through the pit, but is confronted by his uncle. Edwarn reveals he gained Allomancy through Hemalurgy, and tries to kill Wax, but is stopped by Wayne. Dying from his wounds, Wax loses consciousness. He appears in a world beyond death and meets Harmony, who forces Wax to confront his own hatred and self-loathing surrounding the death of Lessie. Harmony also shows Wax a vision of his planet, Scadrial, surrounded by red mist, hinting that he has been holding off a far greater threat than Wax knew. Marasi realizes that the temple is a decoy, and the real bands have been reforged into a metal spearhead on a statue outside the temple. She seizes the Bands, and uses their incredible power to find Wax. Harmony offers Wax the chance to continue his life and fulfil his duty; he takes it, taking the Bands from Marasi and healing his wounds. As Wax uses his newfound power to quickly disable Set forces and capture Edwarn, Steris and Allik liberate his remaining captive crew members. Wayne hunts down and seemingly kills Telsin as she tries to slip away, but later Wax discovers her body is missing and that she has escaped.

Allik's crew uses a newly recovered airship to transport Wax's team and their prisoners back to Elendel. They open potential future trade deals for their peoples before the airship returns to its homeland. However, the governor informs Wax that the murder of Lady Kelesina may spark a war. The Bands are given to the kandra for safekeeping. Wax admits his love for Steris, and they marry in private. A strange, red-eyed servant of Trell visits Edwarn in prison, and detonates a bomb killing itself and Edwarn. Wax discovers that the strange coin from New Seran is a Coppermind, and investigation of the memory inside reveals that the man with the spike in his eye was not the Lord Ruler, but actually Kelsier, the Survivor.

== Characters ==
- Waxillium "Wax" Ladrian: The head of House Ladrian and a special constable and detective, Wax was once a lawman of the roughs. He is a Twinborn with the Allomantic ability to Push metals and the Feruchemical ability to increase or decrease his weight. Wax has been emotionally closed off and enraged at Harmony following the events in Shadows of Self.
- Wayne: Wax's best friend and deputy, an easygoing man who is also a master of disguises. Wayne is a Twinborn that has the Allomantic ability to make speed bubbles, in which time speeds up inside, and the Feruchemical ability to store health in goldminds to heal quickly, in exchange for a period of poor health.
- Marasi Colms: A constable who reports directly to Governor Claude Aradel. She is Steris' illegitimate half-sister, and has worked frequently with Wax and Wayne in the past. She is a Pulser, an Allomancer that can slow down time within a bubble.
- Steris Harms: Waxillium's betrothed, a moderately wealthy noblewoman who has a reputation for being a bore. She has been very supportive of Wax during his recent mental recovery, and the two have grown close.
- MeLaan: A female kandra of the Seventh Generation, who first appeared as a companion of TenSoon in the original trilogy. MeLaan has previously worked with Wax and Wayne to take down Bleeder in Shadows of Self.
- Edwarn Ladrian: Waxillium's uncle, the former lord of House Ladrian, and a high-ranking member of the mysterious Set.
- Telsin Ladrian: Waxillium's sister, who he hasn't seen in decades. She is currently held captive by the Set, and was recently spotted in New Seran.
- Allik: A mysterious man imprisoned by the Set.

== Background ==
On October 29, 2013, Sanderson and Tor Books announced that there would be two more Mistborn novels following The Alloy of Law in the Wax and Wayne timeframe of the Mistborn world, starting with the publication of Shadows of Self.

Sanderson wrote the first third of Shadows of Self between revisions of A Memory of Light from The Wheel of Time series. However, after returning to the book in 2014 Sanderson found it difficult to get back into writing it again. To refresh himself on the world and characters, Sanderson decided to write The Bands of Mourning first and at the end of 2014 he turned both novels in to his publisher.

Tor Books released the first six chapters of the book weekly from December 7, 2015, to January 18, 2016, on their website.

== Audiobook ==
An unabridged audiobook was released on the same day as the physical novel, published by Macmillan Audio. It is narrated by Michael Kramer, who has narrated many of Brandon Sanderson's Cosmere novels.

A 2-part GraphicAudio version (dramatized adaptation) of The Bands of Mourning was released between September and October 2016:

Bands of Mourning [Dramatized Adaptation]
Part	Publication Date	Ref
1	26 September 2016	
2	26 October 2016	

== Reception ==
The Bands of Mourning debuted at #3 on the Combined Print and E-Book New York Times Best Seller list, #6 on the Hardcover Fiction New York Times Best Seller list, and #3 on the E-Book New York Times Best Seller list. The novel debuted at #5 on the Fiction Hardcover Washington Post bestseller list. It debuted at #6 on the USA Today Best-Selling Books list.

Reviewers lauded the novel's swift publication, a mere 16 weeks after Shadows of Self was published. Publishers Weekly praised Sanderson's skill in weaving new opportunities for the dynamic duo's next adventure and noted that the novel would be a delight for die-hard Mistborn fans. The Speculative Herald described the novel as an action-filled romp through a fantasy world on the cusp of an industrial revolution, with strong Western vibes and excellent characterization and humor.

== Sequel ==
On December 16, 2014, Sanderson revealed the tentative title of the fourth and final book of the Wax and Wayne series as The Lost Metal. It was initially planned to be released in 2018 but was subsequently moved to Fall 2019. Due to the release of the previously unplanned Skyward series, it was further postponed and ultimately released on November 15, 2022.
