= Crafty Games =

Tabletop role-playing game publisher

- Company type: Limited Liability Company
- Industry: Tabletop games
- Founded: 2005
- Founder: Alex Flagg, Patrick Kapera, and Scott Gearin
- Headquarters: Portland, Oregon, US
- Products: Spycraft, Little Wizards, and Mistborn Games
- Website: www.crafty-games.com

Crafty Games is an American publisher of tabletop games based on espionage and fantasy themes, particularly Mistborn and Spycraft. The company was founded by the creative team behind the Classic Spycraft and Spycraft 2.0 RPGs, shortly after both lines were shut down by then-publisher Alderac Entertainment Group. Since its inception, Crafty Games has published over 50 products in print and PDF format. Crafty Games' work on Spycraft 2.0 has won nominations for the Diana Jones Award and 4 ENnie Awards in 2006.

== Founders ==
The founders of Crafty Games were affiliated with Alderac Entertainment Group in various capacities. When the Spycraft line was cut in the summer of 2005, they jointly formed Crafty Games.

=== Patrick Kapera ===
A professional content producer and creative manager in the hobby gaming industry since 1998, Patrick Kapera was the co-creator of the award-winning Spycraft role-playing game and its many offshoots, including the Stargate SG-1 RPG while working as a staff writer, editor, developer, and brand manager for AEG. Additionally he has worked on many acclaimed games, including Legend of the Five Rings, 7th Sea, Doomtown, When Darkness Comes, and the Battlestar Galactica RPG.

=== Alex Flagg ===
Once an organizer for the Oregon-based gaming convention Dairyland, Alex was recruited as an AEG freelancer to work on Classic Spycraft in 2002 based on the strength of his homebrewed setting Ten Thousand Bullets. Over the subsequent 5 years, he worked on nearly 2 dozen books for a number of publishers, including AEG, Privateer Press, Fantasy Flight Games, Paradigm Concepts, and Mythic Dreams Studios, and was a core designer of the critically acclaimed Spycraft 2.0.

== Games and products ==
Beyond Spycraft, Crafty Games has recently begun to branch into other games, including Mastercraft, a new system developed as part of their Fantasy Craft RPG. On September 7, 2008, the company also announced its first licensed property, the Mistborn Adventure Game, based on Brandon Sanderson's Mistborn series of novels.

== See also ==
- List of companies based in Oregon
