= Mistborn: Shadows of Self =

2015 fantasy novel by Brandon Sanderson

- First edition cover
- Author: Brandon Sanderson
- Illustrator: Isaac Stewart; Ben McSweeney
- Cover artist: Chris McGrath
- Language: English
- Series: Wax and Wayne, Mistborn
- Genre: Fantasy novel
- Published: October 6, 2015
- Publisher: Tor Books
- Publication place: United States
- Media type: Print (hardcover and paperback), audiobook, e-book
- Pages: 383 pp
- ISBN: 978-0-7653-7855-2
- OCLC: 915057133
- Dewey Decimal: 813.6
- LC Class: PS3619.A533
- Preceded by: Mistborn: The Alloy of Law
- Followed by: Mistborn: The Bands of Mourning

Mistborn: Shadows of Self is a fantasy novel written by American author Brandon Sanderson. It was published on October 6, 2015, by Tor Books and is the second book in the Wax and Wayne series and fifth in the Mistborn series. It is preceded by The Alloy of Law in 2011 and followed by The Bands of Mourning in 2016.

== Plot summary ==
In a flashback, Waxillium Ladrian first meets his future wife Lessie on a bounty hunt, where they work together to bag a powerful crime boss. In the present, it is one year since the defeat of the Vanishers. Wax and Marasi have learned of the art of Hemalurgy from the book given to them by Ironeyes. Wax has now been deputized by the city's constabulary.

While hunting down a criminal called the Marksman with his partner Wayne, Wax sees the face of Bloody Tan (the man responsible for Lessie's death) in a crowd, but is unable to find him when he searches. Wax is called off the job and summoned by the constables to aid in a major investigation: the brother of Elendel's governor has been murdered at a meeting with a number of powerful crime bosses, who have all also been killed. This incident further stokes unrest over corruption and bad working conditions in the city. Wax finds evidence that only a Steelrunner (a Feruchemist who can store and utilize speed) could have committed the murders, but when he tracks down the only Steelrunner in the city, he finds her dead, murdered with a Hemalurgic spike.

Wax is approached by Harmony himself, who informs him that a rogue kandra named Paalm, now known as Bleeder, is responsible for the killings. She has gone mad, and ripped out one of her spikes to hide from Harmony. She has also found a way to grant herself metallic powers using Hemalurgy, though she can only hold one ability at a time. She now seeks unrest and destruction in the city, and is convinced that Harmony is a terrible, cruel god. Harmony promises to send supernatural help to Wax in order to foil her plots.

Wax and Marasi become convinced that governor Innate (whom Marasi has discovered is corrupt) will be the next target of Bleeder's attacks, and Wax finds evidence that Bleeder may have a personal vendetta against him. Bleeder finds a way to mentally communicate with Wax and draws him away from a noble party and into a trap laid by Set enforcers. Wax is saved by MeLaan, a kandra sent by Harmony to help him. Wax contacts his uncle Edwarn and attempts to strike a truce with the Set, but learns that the Set is backing Bleeder with both manpower and money. Bleeder kills a Survivorist priest while posing as a Pathian, which spurs riots in the city. Constable-general Aradel seeks permission to institute martial law.

Bleeder launches an attack on the governor's mansion, using her speed to slip by Wax and Wayne's defenses and to break into the governor's safe room; she only kills Innate's bodyguard before fleeing, however, and Wax guesses that she will not kill Innate until she can further destabilize the city. Innate gives permission for martial law, and insists on making a speech to quell the population. Bleeder leads Wax on another false chase alongside the famed kandra TenSoon, where they discover that she has made other Hemalurgic creations. Wax returns to the governor's mansion, and realizes that Bleeder has had time to prepare for many months, leading him to correctly guess that she has already killed and taken the place of the governor. Found out, she is forced to switch bodies and flee, Wax giving chase.

Wayne and Marasi have MeLaan impersonate the governor and give a speech to appease the populace. When even this does not seem to head off the rioters, Aradel publicly arrests the governor (MeLaan) on charges of corruption and installs himself as city leader. Wax pursues Bleeder to a bridge, where he discovers she is impersonating Lessie. He fires a specially crafted bullet with his hemalurgic earring forged inside it into her, allowing Harmony to assert his control. Rather than be controlled, she commits suicide, and as she dies, she says things which only the real Lessie could know. Wax, anguished, realizes that she is the real Lessie, and TenSoon arrives to explain that she had been sent to watch over Wax in the Roughs. Wax is horrified that he has now killed her a second time.

Aradel is officially named governor, the first ever without noble blood; he begins immediate work exposing corruption. MeLaan fakes the suicide of Innate, and warns Marasi that a spike recovered from Bleeder is made of a metal that even Harmony has never seen. MeLaan's warnings prompt Marasi to research Trell, an ancient god whom Miles Hundredlives referenced with his final words. Meanwhile, Wax slips into a deeply melancholic and isolationist depression.

== Characters ==
- Waxillium "Wax" Ladrian: The hereditary Lord of House Ladrian. A former lawman in the Roughs, he has a current special deputized forbearance in the constabulary. He is a Twinborn with the Allomantic ability to Push metals and the Feruchemical ability to increase or decrease his weight.
- Wayne: Wax's best friend and deputy, a master of disguises. A Twinborn as well, Wayne has the Allomantic ability to make speed bubbles, in which time speeds up inside and slows down outside; and the Feruchemical ability to store health in goldminds to heal quickly, in exchange for a period of poor health.
- Marasi Colms: A constable and aide to Constable-General Claude Aradel in the Fourth Octant, serving as an analyst and his executive assistant. She is the illegitimate daughter of Lord Jackstom Harms and is Steris' half-sister. She accompanies Wax and Wayne along in their investigations. She is a Pulser, an Allomancer that can slow down time within a bubble and speed up time outside.
- Bleeder or Paalm: A rogue and deranged female Kandra of the Third Generation, who once served the Lord Ruler. She plots to block Harmony's influence over Elendel.
- MeLaan: A female Kandra of the Seventh Generation. She has previously appeared in the original trilogy. She was sent by Harmony to aid Waxillium in incapacitating Bleeder.
- Steris Harms: Waxillium's betrothed, who has a reputation of being a bore.
- Replar Innate: Governor of Elendel, whom Marasi believes to be corrupt. His brother Winsting Innate was recently murdered at a meeting with various criminal factions.
- Claude Aradel: Constable-General of the Fourth Octant, a man of honor, who has not a single drop of noble blood in him.
- Edwarn Ladrian: Waxillium's villainous uncle, who is one of the leaders of the mysterious group known as the Set.

== Background ==
On October 29, 2013, Sanderson and Tor Books announced that there would be two more Mistborn novels following The Alloy of Law in the Wax and Wayne timeframe of the Mistborn world, starting with the publication of Shadows of Self.

== Audiobook ==
An unabridged audiobook was released on the same day as the physical novel, published by Macmillan Audio. It is narrated by Michael Kramer, who has narrated many of Brandon Sanderson's Cosmere novels.

A GraphicAudio version (dramatized adaptation) of Shadows of Self was released on July 25, 2016.

== Reception ==
Shadows of Self debuted at #5 on the Combined Print and E-Book New York Times Best Seller list, #8 on the Hardcover Fiction New York Times Best Seller list, and #5 on the E-Book New York Times Best Seller list. It debuted at #42 on the USA Today Best-Selling Books list.

Kirkus Reviews praised Shadows of Self over The Alloy of Law stating that it "deals far more than its predecessor with its world's complicated mythology, but the action never lets up, and the characters never lose their endearing humanity." They also called it "a fast-paced fantasy adventure set in a fascinating world and populated with lovable, memorable characters." Publishers Weekly commented that "fantasy fans will savor this exciting escapade."
