= Mistborn: The Well of Ascension =

2007 fantasy novel by Brandon Sanderson

- First edition cover
- Author: Brandon Sanderson
- Illustrator: Isaac Stewart
- Cover artist: Jon Foster
- Language: English
- Series: Mistborn
- Release number: 2
- Genre: Fantasy novel
- Publisher: Tor Books, Macmillan Audio
- Publication date: August 21, 2007
- Publication place: United States
- Media type: Print (hardcover and paperback), audiobook, e-book
- Pages: 590 pp (first edition, hardback); 781 pp (U.S. mass market paperback)
- ISBN: 978-0-7653-1688-2 (first edition, hardback)
- OCLC: 122715367
- Dewey Decimal: 813/.6 22
- LC Class: PS3619.A533 W45 2007
- Preceded by: Mistborn: The Final Empire
- Followed by: Mistborn: The Hero of Ages

Mistborn: The Well of Ascension is a fantasy novel written by American author Brandon Sanderson. It was published on August 21, 2007, by Tor Books and is the second novel in the Mistborn trilogy. It is preceded by The Final Empire in 2006 and followed by The Hero of Ages in 2008.

The Well of Ascension follows the surviving members of Kelsier's crew as they deal with the aftermath of the collapse of the Final Empire. Vin and Elend, who becomes king of the capital city of Luthadel, struggle to exert control over his democratic government while facing a siege from three armies, including one run by Elend's father, Straff. Meanwhile, Sazed investigates a prophecy about the purported Well of Ascension from before the establishment of the Final Empire.

== Plot ==
A year after the events of the first novel, the Final Empire is in turmoil as various regions descend into anarchy following the Lord Ruler's death and the disappearance of the Steel Ministry. Elend Venture has claimed the crown of the capital city, Luthadel, and attempts to restore order, but various hostile forces converge on the city. Three armies lay siege to Luthadel because of its rumored wealth of atium and political influence. The first army is led by Straff Venture – head of House Venture, and Elend's father. The second army is led by Ashweather Cett, self-declared king of the Western Dominance. The third army consists of koloss, massive, brutish blue creatures once controlled by the Lord Ruler, and is led by Elend's former friend Jastes, who is buying the koloss' obedience with counterfeit coins.

Vin and Elend discover a set of discarded bones in their keep, and with help from Vin's shapeshifting kandra, OreSeur, realize that another kandra has taken the form and identity of one of Kelsier's crew to spy on them. Vin becomes increasingly suspicious of everyone around her. At night, she begins sparring with Zane, Straff's Mistborn son and Elend's half brother. In the South, Sazed has come across suspicious deaths that appear to be caused by the mists. Marsh – Kelsier's brother and a Steel Inquisitor – leads Sazed to a Ministry stronghold called "The Conventical of Seran," the former base of the Inquisitors. They discover an engraving that was authored by the Terrisman who once claimed to have found the Hero of Ages, which begins "I write these words in steel, for anything not set in metal cannot be trusted." They leave quickly, Sazed taking a charcoal rubbing. On their way back to Luthadel, Marsh disappears.

The Terris Keeper Tindwyl arrives at Luthadel to train Elend to be a better king. Despite his personal improvements, the Assembly votes to depose Elend, using the very laws written by him, and elect Lord Penrod as their new king. Zane pressures Vin to kill her enemies and flee with him, abandoning the city. Misting assassins attack Elend at an Assembly meeting, and when Vin brutally kills them in front of Elend, their relationship deteriorates. At Zane's urging, Vin lashes out, slaughtering hundreds of Cett's soldiers at his temporary Luthadel mansion. She becomes disturbed by her actions and flees without killing Cett, who decides to leave the city and abandon his siege. Vin decides to choose Elend over Zane and refuses his offer to flee. Zane tries to kill her, and reveals that the real OreSeur is dead, having been replaced by Zane's kandra, TenSoon. TenSoon has grown to like Vin, and he helps her kill Zane before returning to the kandra homeland. Feeling liberated, Vin accepts Elend's longstanding marriage proposal. Sazed and the rest of the crew scheme to get Elend and Vin out of the city before it falls, and Sazed creates a false map to the Well of Ascension, which Vin is convinced may be able to save them.

Sazed and Tindwyl have been studying the mysterious text left by the Terrisman Kwaan, which explains the events of the Lord Ruler's ascent. Kwaan believed he had discovered the Hero of Ages in the person of Alendi, who rose to become a feared general and ruler known as the "Conqueror". However, Kwaan had become fearful for an unknown reason, and started believing that Alendi was not actually the Hero of Ages. Anxious about what would happen when Alendi reached the Well of Ascension and tried to use the power within, Kwaan instructed his nephew Rashek to mislead Alendi or kill him if needed. Rashek obeyed his uncle's command, but instead claimed the power for himself and became the Lord Ruler. Sazed and Tindwyl's research is complicated by their disagreements over the nature of the Hero of Ages prophecy, and Sazed becomes convinced that Vin herself is actually the Hero of Ages. At some point, one fragment of the text Sazed has transcribed from his metalminds is mysteriously ripped off.

Straff withdraws his forces, allowing the koloss army to attack Luthadel, planning to rescue the city after the koloss have destroyed most of it and suffered casualties. Jastes loses control of his army; he flees and is killed by Elend for putting the city in danger. Vin returns to Luthadel just in time to save Sazed and most of the city's civilians, though Dockson, Tindwyl, and Clubs are killed. She discovers that she can control the koloss using her Allomancy; she stops their slaughtering and turns them and Luthadel's army against Straff's army. Vin kills Straff and his generals as Cett decides to ally himself with Luthadel. Vin forces Cett, Penrod, and Straff's last general to swear allegiance as kings under Elend, whom she names emperor.

Vin realizes that the Well of Ascension is in Luthadel itself; Rashek had transferred it from Terris to his stronghold when he had remade the world after claiming the Well's power, ensuring that he could keep it close and hide it from others. Vin, Elend, and Spook find a hidden doorway in the Lord Ruler's castle that leads down to the underground Well of Ascension, where a figure made of mist stabs Elend. Meanwhile, a similar spirit approaches Sazed, revealing the fragment of text which had disappeared from his and Tindwyl's transcription: Alendi must not reach the Well of Ascension, for he must not be allowed to release the thing that is imprisoned there. Sazed attempts to stop Vin but is attacked by Marsh, who appears to struggle with his quest to kill Sazed. Sazed is saved by Ham, and Marsh escapes. Meanwhile, Vin is tempted to use the power in the Well to heal Elend, but ultimately follows the instruction of Sazed's rubbing, releasing the power for the good of the world rather than seizing it for herself. The moment she releases it, a powerful entity escapes, shouting that it is now free. The Mist figure encourages Vin to feed Elend a bead of metal she finds in the room, which turns him into a Mistborn; his life is saved through Allomancy by burning pewter.

Two weeks later, Sazed returns to The Conventical of Seran and inspects the engraving. He discovers that the words of the rubbing have been changed, finally explaining why Kwaan had inscribed it in metal where it could not be altered. Even the text in Sazed's metalminds had been manipulated, presumably by the mysterious entity working to secure its own release. Realizing that he had been manipulated and the entire Hero of Ages prophecy had been a lie designed to release the power hidden in the Well of Ascension, Sazed loses his faith.

== Characters ==
- Vin: a half-skaa Mistborn who killed the Lord Ruler and is the Survivor's Heir. She believes herself to be the Hero of Ages, and fights to protect Luthadel from its enemies. She is in a relationship with Elend.
- Elend Venture: the king of the Central Dominance and leader of the Luthadel Assembly; a nobleman with a good heart who cares about the people. He is in love with Vin.
- Dockson or "Dox": a member of Kelsier's crew, he is in charge of operations and administration for the crew and Luthadel. He was the closest to Kelsier, and is the only member who isn't an Allomancer.
- Hammond or "Ham": a member of Kelsier's crew and a general in Elend's military. He is a Pewter-burning Thug. Ham enjoys philosophical bouts, especially with Breeze.
- Breeze: a member of Kelsier's crew and a Soother.
- Clubs: a member of Kelsier's crew and a general in Elend's military. He is a Smoker, and the uncle of Spook.
- Spook: a member of Kelsier's crew and Clubs' nephew. He is a Tineye and the youngest member of the crew. Formerly known as Lestibournes, Kelsier gave him a new nickname, Spook.
- Marsh: Kelsier's brother, who was turned into a Steel Inquisitor during the rebellion against the Lord Ruler.
- Sazed: a Terrisman from the Northern Dominance of Terris. He is a Feruchemist Keeper, specializing in the keeping of religions. With the Final Empire overthrown, Sazed's duty is to spread his knowledge to the world.
- Tindwyl: a Terriswoman from the Northern Dominance of Terris. She is a Keeper, specializing in the remembering of great political leaders.
- OreSeur: a Kandra who is bound to Vin by a Contract, though the two despise each other. At her request, he takes the form of a wolfhound.
- Straff Venture: Elend's father and a Tineye. He is king of the Northern Dominance.
- Ashweather Cett: the self-declared king of the Western Dominance.
- Allrianne Cett: Ashweather Cett's only daughter, considered to be somewhat of a ditz by Vin.
- Jastes Lekal: the former best friend of Elend and the current king of the Southern Dominance.
- Zane: a Mistborn who considers himself insane. He is an illegitimate son of Straff Venture.
- TenSoon: the Kandra that belonged to Straff Venture and was later commanded by Zane.

== Adaptations ==
=== Audiobook ===
An unabridged audiobook version was released in December 2008 by Macmillan Audio and is narrated by Michael Kramer.

A three-part GraphicAudio dramatized adaptation of The Well of Ascension was released between August and October 2014:

| Part | Publication Date | Ref |
|---|---|---|
| 1 | 1 August 2014 | |
| 2 | 1 September 2014 | |
| 3 | 1 October 2014 | |

Author Brandon Sanderson praised the GraphicAudio versions, saying that they

aren't your average audiobooks—they're full-cast recordings with some sound effects, though they're still nearly unabridged; only a few things such as dialogue tags ("she said") get trimmed out, since by the voice actor you can know who's talking.

The dramatized adaptation of The Well of Ascension is available in either stereo or 5.1-channel surround sound format.

== Reception ==
A reviewer for Publishers Weekly expressed admiration for the second book in the series by writing "this entertaining read will especially please those who always wanted to know what happened after the good guys won."

The GraphicAudio dramatized adaptation received 5/5 stars from Audio Drama Reviews.
