= Mistborn: The Alloy of Law =

2011 fantasy novel by Brandon Sanderson

- First edition cover
- Author: Brandon Sanderson
- Illustrator: Isaac Stewart; Ben McSweeney
- Cover artist: Chris McGrath
- Language: English
- Series: Wax and Wayne, Mistborn
- Genre: Fantasy novel
- Published: November 8, 2011
- Publisher: Tor Books
- Publication place: United States
- Media type: Print (hardcover and paperback), audiobook, e-book
- Pages: 336 pp
- ISBN: 978-0-7653-3042-0
- OCLC: 707969381
- Dewey Decimal: 813.6
- LC Class: PS3619.A533
- Preceded by: Mistborn: The Hero of Ages
- Followed by: Mistborn: Shadows of Self

Mistborn: The Alloy of Law is a fantasy novel written by American author Brandon Sanderson. It was published on November 8, 2011, by Tor Books and is the first book in the Wax and Wayne series and fourth in the Mistborn series. It is preceded by The Hero of Ages from the Mistborn Original Trilogy in 2008 and followed by Shadows of Self in 2015.

The story features Twinborns, Metalborns who are able to use Allomancy and Feruchemy in conjunction, along with abilities from new metals not present in the original trilogy.

== Plot ==
The Alloy of Law is set in an analog to the early 20th century, on Scadrial, approximately 300 years after the conclusion of the original trilogy. It also introduces the concept of Twinborn, beings naturally born with one allomantic and one feruchemical ability, for the first time in the series.

Lawman Waxillium "Wax" Ladrian and his partner Lessie are investigating a serial killer in Feltrel, a small town in the Roughs. They decide to split up and Wax follows the murderer's tracks, leading him into a small church, where he finds that Lessie had been captured and held hostage by the serial killer. While trying to free her, Wax accidentally kills Lessie.

Five months after the death of Lessie, Wax has given up the role as peacekeeper, and returned to Elendel, where after the death of his uncle and sister who were involved in a carriage accident, he has become the head of his house. Due to his uncle's inadequate financial operations, Wax is trying to save House Ladrian from bankruptcy. The only way to do it is to find a suitable high-born lady from a financially stable house to marry.

Just before meeting with promising prospect Lady Steris and her father, Wax is unexpectedly visited by his friend, deputy, and master of disguise Wayne who is also a Twinborn with the abilities to create speed bubbles, and store health in his goldminds, who has come to Elendel to investigate a series of robberies and kidnappings for which a rogue band called "the Vanishers" is responsible. He wants Wax's help to solve the case. Although still torn between his previous life as a lawman and his obligations to House Ladrian, Wax declines to join him. During the meeting with Lady Steris, her father, and her half-sister Marasi (who is posing as a distant cousin to Lady Steris, for she is illegitimately born), Wayne pretends to be Wax's distant uncle. Wax and Lady Steris come to an agreement to marry after several months of courting, and to introduce themselves as a couple to the elite society.

At a wedding party held by House Tekiel, the Vanishers show up and try to kidnap Steris and Marasi. Wax and Wayne, working as a team, manage to save Marasi, and kill most of the Vanishers when the event becomes violent. However, their leader and a few others slip away with Steris. Wax decides to solve the case and rescue his wife-to-be. After a careful recollection of the events at the wedding, Wax comes to the conclusion that the band is led by a former lawman named Miles, who is a Twinborn with the ability to cure any injury almost immediately.

Wayne discovers the bandits' hideout after interrogating one of the captives in police custody, and meets with Wax and Marasi in House Ladrian's mansion to share his findings. There, Wax's butler tries to kill him, but the trio manage to escape.

Wax and Wayne, accompanied by Marasi, go to the bandits' hideout, and find it deserted, with minimal remaining evidence. They visit an old acquaintance – a gunsmith named Ranette – and form a plan to capture the bandits during their next robbery.

Wax deduces that the Vanishers will try to rob a train transporting large amounts of aluminium which is extremely valuable due to its immunity to allomancy. He manages to slip into the cargo hold of the train. Meanwhile, Wayne and Marasi watch as the bandits switch the train's carts, and manage to follow them to their new hideout. There, after a long battle, in which all the bandits except Miles are killed, Wax and Marasi manage to distract Miles long enough with Marasi's Allomantic ability to slow down time inside a speed bubble for Wayne to fetch enough law officers to subdue and capture Miles. Lady Steris is saved, and, although Wax feels attraction to Marasi, he decides to continue with the planned marriage.

Wax discovers that the person who had recruited Miles in the first place is the presumed dead Lord Edwarn Ladrian, Wax's uncle, who still holds the other kidnapped women. Edwarn is connected to a shadowy organization known as the Set, and has used the robberies to commit profitable insurance fraud. Wax and Wayne decide that they will stay in Elendel and try to stop Lord Edwarn and his organization from fulfilling their plans. Miles is stripped of his metalminds and publicly executed. Marasi is approached by Ironeyes, Marsh, now revered as Death himself, and is given a mysterious book.

== Characters ==
- Waxillium "Wax" Ladrian: a descendant of Breeze's house from the original trilogy, he is in his forties, a lawman with twenty years of experience. After leaving his life as a lawman in the Roughs, he returns to rebuild his House, which his uncle left poor and destitute. He is an excellent shot and an astute investigator. He is a Twinborn known as a "Crasher," with the Allomantic ability to Push metals and the Feruchemical ability to increase or decrease his weight.
- Wayne: Wax's best friend and deputy, Wayne follows Wax back to the city and pesters him to rejoin the law career. Also a Twinborn, he is Allomantically able to make speed bubbles, in which time is compressed and speeds up; he can also Feruchemically store health in goldminds to heal quickly, in exchange for a period of poor health. He is skilled at disguises, and mimicking accents.
- Marasi Colms: an intelligent woman, she studies law in the university and has a passion for statistics. After hearing the stories of Wax and Wayne's good deeds in the Roughs, she becomes a fan and tags along with them. She can Allomantically create speed bubbles that slow down time inside the bubble, while outside the bubble time flows freely-a talent she is mostly embarrassed of as she sees it at useless. She is an illegitimate child of Lord Jackstom Harms, and is Steris' half-sister.
- Steris Harms: The legitimate daughter of Lord Harms and the half-sister of Marasi. She is betrothed to Wax. She is characterized as a stiff, overly formal and somewhat boring young woman. Wax is aware of these traits yet agrees to marry her hoping to settle down in the city and secure her house's wealth. When she is kidnapped by a gang of robbers called the Vanishers, Wax takes it upon himself to track them down and rescue her.
- Miles Dagouter: a former lawman and acquaintance of Wax from his time in the Roughs. He has turned bitter against the system and believes that the wealth and pomp of Elendel is the cause of the deprivation in the Roughs. He now leads the Vanishers. He is also a Twinborn, with the ability to heal any wounds to himself almost instantly due to both Feruchemical and Allomantic gifts with Gold, earning him the name "Miles Hundredlives".
- Lessie: Wax's former love interest and partner when he served as a lawman. Wax kills her by accident when he shoots at a serial killer. The incident becomes the impetus for Wax to leave the Roughs and come back to Elendel.

== Background ==
The work that eventually turned into Mistborn: The Alloy of Law was originally a creative writing exercise, not necessarily intended for publication, to help clear Sanderson's head before continuing work on A Memory of Light from The Wheel of Time and the next book in The Stormlight Archive. It turned out better than expected and was released for publication.

Alloy of Law was originally released as a standalone, transitional sequel to the original Mistborn trilogy. In December 2014, Sanderson stated he would write a follow-up trilogy to The Alloy of Law, and it later became the first of four books in the Wax and Wayne series.

== Audiobook ==
An unabridged audiobook was released on the same day as the physical novel, published by Macmillan Audio. It is narrated by Michael Kramer, who has narrated many of Brandon Sanderson's Cosmere novels.

A GraphicAudio version (dramatized adaptation) of The Alloy of Law was released on 27 April 2016.

== Reception ==
=== Critical response and sales ===
The Alloy of Law debuted at #9 on the Combined Print and E-Book New York Times Best Seller list, #10 on the Combined Hardcover & Paperback Fiction New York Times Best Seller list, and #13 on the E-Book New York Times Best Seller list. The novel debuted at #10 on the Fiction Hardcover Washington Post bestseller list. It debuted at #37 on the USA Today Best-Selling Books list.

Library Journal praised it as "highly recommended for fantasy fans, especially followers of the original trilogy" and that it "is not a stale visit to a fondly remembered setting" in its starred review of it. The novel received a mixed review by Kirkus Reviews that stated: "Sanderson's fresh ideas on the source and employment of magic are both arresting and original—just don't expect rigorously worked out plot details, memorable characters or narrative depth. Think brisk. Think fun." Publishers Weekly expressed that they viewed it as "Part Sherlock Holmes, part X-Men" and that it is an "exciting stand-alone adventure is full of close shaves, shootouts, and witty banter."

=== Awards and nominations ===
Year	Award	Category	Result	Ref
2011	Whitney Awards	Best Speculative Fiction	Won	
2011	Goodreads Choice Awards	Best Fantasy Novel	Nominated	
2012	David Gemmell Legend Award	Best Novel	Nominated	
