= Mistborn: The Final Empire =

2006 fantasy novel by Brandon Sanderson

- First edition cover
- Author: Brandon Sanderson
- Illustrator: Isaac Stewart
- Cover artist: Jon Foster
- Language: English
- Series: Mistborn
- Release number: 1
- Genre: Fantasy novel
- Publisher: Tor Books, Macmillan Audio
- Publication date: July 17, 2006
- Publication place: United States
- Media type: Print (hardcover, paperback and leatherbound), audiobook, e-book
- Pages: 541 pp (first edition, hardback); 647 (U.S. mass market paperback)
- ISBN: 0-7653-1178-X (first edition, hardback)
- OCLC: 62342185
- Dewey Decimal: 813/.6 22
- LC Class: PS3619.A533 M57 2006
- Followed by: Mistborn: The Well of Ascension

Mistborn: The Final Empire is a fantasy novel written by American author Brandon Sanderson. It was published on July 17, 2006, by Tor Books and is the first novel in the Mistborn trilogy, followed by The Well of Ascension in 2007 and The Hero of Ages in 2008.

The novel is set in the Final Empire, a tyrannical regime led by the seemingly immortal Lord Ruler. The human population is mainly divided into the nobility and the heavily oppressed skaa. The magic system of Allomancy allows certain people to digest and metabolize metals to use certain magical powers. While most Allomancers are only able to use one type of metal, which grants them one of the powers, rare Allomancers called Mistborn can use any metal. In The Final Empire, the half-skaa Mistborn Kelsier and his crew recruit a street urchin named Vin in their plot to overthrow the Lord Ruler.

== Synopsis ==
=== Setting ===
Mistborn: The Final Empire is set on the dystopian world of Scadrial, where ash constantly falls from the sky, all plants are brown, and supernatural mists cloak the landscape every night. One thousand years before the start of the novel, the prophesized Hero of Ages ascended to godhood at the Well of Ascension in order to repel the Deepness, a terror threatening the world whose true nature has since been lost to time. Though the Deepness was successfully repelled and mankind saved, the world was changed into its current form by the Hero, who took the title "Lord Ruler" and has ruled over the Final Empire for a thousand years as an immortal tyrant and god. Under his rule, society is stratified into the nobility, believed to be the descendants of the friends and allies who helped him achieve godhood, and the brutally oppressed peasantry descended from those who opposed him, known as Skaa.

Magic is central to the Mistborn world. The most widely known discipline of magic is called Allomancy, which allows users to gain supernatural abilities by swallowing and "burning" specific metals. Allomantic potential is a genetic trait concentrated in the nobility, though skaa Allomancers also exist due to crossbreeding between the nobility and the skaa. Normal Allomancers have access to one Allomantic power, but an incredibly rare subset of Allomancers, called Mistborn, have access to every Allomantic power.

=== Plot ===
Three years prior to the start of the novel, a half-skaa thief named Kelsier discovered that he is Mistborn and escapes the Pits of Hathsin, a brutal prison camp of the Lord Ruler. He returned to Luthadel, the capital city of the Final Empire, where he rounded up his old thieving crew for a new job: to overthrow the Final Empire by stealing its treasury and collapsing its economy.

At the beginning of the novel, Vin, a wary and abused street urchin, is recruited by Kelsier's crew after Kelsier is notified by his brother, Marsh, that she is a Mistborn. Vin is trained by Kelsier's crew to develop her Allomantic powers, which include burning pewter to strengthen the body, burning tin to enhance the senses, and burning steel and iron to gain a limited form of telekinesis over metal. She is also given the duty of spying on the nobility by attending opulent balls in Luthadel (the capital and center of the Final Empire), where she poses as Valette Renoux, niece to Lord Renoux, a nobleman working with Kelsier's crew. During these balls, she meets and falls in love with Elend Venture, heir to House Venture, the most powerful of the Luthadel noble houses. Elend flouts the rules of nobility culture and secretly plans to build a better society with his noble friends when they ascend to their respective house titles.

Kelsier hopes to conquer the city by destabilizing it with a house war between the nobility and then invading with a skaa army. Once in control, he hopes to overthrow the Final Empire by stealing the Lord Ruler's hoard of atium, a precious metal which is the cornerstone of the Final Empire's economy. The crew succeeds in starting a house war by assassinating several powerful nobles and recruiting about seven thousand soldiers to join their cause. However, about three quarters of the soldiers are slaughtered when they foolishly attack an unimportant Final Empire garrison with the hopes of divine protection from Kelsier, who has spread rumors of his "supernatural" powers. The remaining soldiers are smuggled into Luthadel by Kelsier, who intends to continue the plan. However, Marsh is discovered and seemingly killed, and Lord Renoux and his estate are seized and he is brought to be executed by the Canton of Inquisition, the police arm of the Final Empire. This Canton is made up of Steel Inquisitors, seemingly indestructible Allomancers with steel spikes driven through their eyes. Though Kelsier's crew manage to free most of Renoux's group and kill an Inquisitor, Kelsier is killed by the Lord Ruler himself in a dramatic confrontation in Luthadel's city square. Though these events appear to leave Kelsier's plan in shambles, it is revealed that his real plan was to become a martyred symbol of hope for Luthadel's superstitious skaa population. The skaa population reacts to his death by rising up and overthrowing the city with the help of Kelsier's army.

Before his death, Kelsier had attempted to unlock the potential of the "Eleventh Metal" that he had acquired, which was rumored to be the Lord Ruler's weakness. He was unable to do so before his death, and left it to Vin to finish the job. With the Eleventh Metal, Vin goes to the imperial palace to kill the Lord Ruler. She is captured by the Canton of Inquisition and left in a cell to be tortured, but Sazed, her faithful Terrisman servant, comes to her rescue. Using a magical discipline called Feruchemy, he helps Vin escape and recover her possessions. Marsh is revealed to be alive, having actually been made into a Steel Inquisitor; he betrays his fellow Inquisitors and slays them before being overpowered by the Lord Ruler. Vin fights the Lord Ruler, whom she recognizes as not the Hero of Ages, but his Terrisman advisor Rashek, who had killed the Hero and taken his place as an incredibly powerful Allomancer and a Feruchemist, the combination of which grants him incredible healing powers and eternal youth. Vin is almost destroyed by the Lord Ruler, but with hints from the Eleventh Metal and the unexpected magical aid of the mists, she manages to separate the Lord Ruler from his Feruchemical bracelets that provide him with constant youth, causing him to age rapidly. Vin uses a spear to execute the Lord Ruler, who with his last words ominously warns her of a great doom. The Final Empire collapses, though Elend is able to avoid total societal collapse by uniting Luthadel under a new system of democratic government.

== Development ==
Sanderson began work on the novel while trying to get his earlier novel Elantris published. After writing two early iterations, he shifted his focus to his Stormlight Archive series but chose to delay its publication in favor of completing the Mistborn series because he thought it would serve as a better follow-up to Elantris.

== Reception ==
Upon publication, Mistborn: The Final Empire was nominated for the Romantic Times Reviewers' Choice Best Book Award for an Epic Fantasy Novel.

A review in The Washington Post said "Sanderson's characters aren't particularly well-developed, and the allomancy sometimes feels a little like a video game trick (press X-Y-X-X to burn steel!). But he has created a fascinating world here, one that deserves a sequel." Forbes magazine praised all of the books in the Mistborn series collectively: "The narrative is crafted with such bloody precision, it's nearly impossible to put the books down."

Time Magazine listed it as one of the best fantasy books ever written in "The 100 Best Fantasy Books of All Time".

The dramatized adaptation audiobook version of Mistborn: The Final Empire was a finalist for the 2015 Audie Award for Audio Drama.

== Adaptations ==
=== Film ===
In January 2010, Brandon Sanderson optioned the rights to the Mistborn books to Paloppa Pictures, LLC. In Q1 of 2014, Paloppa Pictures' option ran out. In October 2016, the rights to the entire Cosmere universe, including the Mistborn series, were licensed by DMG Entertainment. On January 27, 2017, Deadline Hollywood reported that DMG signed F. Scott Frazier as the screenwriter for an adaptation of Mistborn: The Final Empire. By 2025, the rights had since reverted back to Sanderson. On January 28, 2026, the Hollywood Reporter published an exclusive report that Apple had entered into a partnership to adapt the Cosmere for both feature film and premium TV, with Mistborn being the first project to be developed. Sanderson himself has since begun writing the screenplay.

=== Audiobook ===
An unabridged audiobook version was released in December 2008 by Macmillan Audio and is narrated by Michael Kramer.

A three-part GraphicAudio dramatized adaptation of The Final Empire was released between December 2013 and February 2014:

Part	Publication Date	Ref
1	1 December 2013	
2	1 January 2014	
3	1 February 2014	

Author Brandon Sanderson praised the GraphicAudio versions, saying that they

aren't your average audiobooks—they're full-cast recordings with some sound effects, though they're still nearly unabridged; only a few things such as dialogue tags ("she said") get trimmed out, since by the voice actor you can know who's talking.

The dramatized adaptation of Mistborn: The Final Empire is available in either stereo or 5.1-channel surround sound format.
