= Shadowforce Archer =

Role-playing game supplement

Shadowforce Archer is a 2002 role-playing game supplement published by Alderac Entertainment Group for Spycraft.

== Contents ==
Shadowforce Archer is a supplement in which a campaign setting blends conspiracies, psychic espionage, mystic threats, rogue agencies, and cross‑genre spy action into a globe‑spanning struggle where operatives of the Archer Conspiracy must stop both external enemies and a deadly betrayal from within.

== Reviews ==
- Pyramid
- Asgard (Issue 6 - Jun 2002)
- Campaign Magazine (Issue 5 - Sep/Oct 2002)
