= Jon Foster (artist) =

American freelance illustrator, penciler, and sculptor

- Area: Artist

Jon Foster is an American freelance illustrator, penciler, and sculptor.

== Biography ==
Foster is best known for his comic book covers (DC Comics, Dark Horse Comics) and other works featured in role-playing games such as Dungeons & Dragons and Alternity.

Jon Foster studied illustration at the Rhode Island School of Design and graduated in 1989. His paintings are oils on canvas and are known to have a dark or muted color palette. Typically, they incorporate subject matter like good vs. evil, anger, and adventure. Before a project is complete, Foster scans his paintings into a computer to add digital effects.

Earlier in his career, Jon collaborated with artists such as Rick Berry and Dave Dorman (well known Star Wars artist).

Foster has illustrated cards for the Magic: The Gathering collectible card game.

Some of his achievements include multiple awards from the prestigious Spectrum sci-fi and fantasy art publications.

Jon lives in Providence, Rhode Island.

== Works ==
=== Books ===
- Progressions (February 2003)
- Revolution: The Art of Jon Foster (November 2006)

=== Book covers ===
- Star Wars: The New Jedi Order: Force Heretic Trilogy by Sean Williams and Shane Dix (Del Rey Books, 2003)
- The Uninvited (May 2004)
- Snake Agent by Liz Williams (Night Shade Books, September 2005)
- The Dragonback series by Timothy Zahn (Starscape Books, 2005)
- The Demon and the City by Liz Williams (Night Shade Books, August 2006)
- Dark Harvest by Norman Partridge (Cemetery Dance, 2006)
- Mistborn: The Final Empire, Mistborn: The Well of Ascension, and Mistborn: Hero of Ages by Brandon Sanderson
- The Chronicles of Master Li and Number Ten Ox by Barry Hughart (Subterranean Press, 2008)
- Fender Lizards by Joe R. Lansdale (Subterranean Press, 2015)

=== Comics ===
- Aliens vs. Predator vs. Terminator
- Batman: the Ring, the Arrow and the Bat
- Hunter
- The Nightmare Factory - Volume 2
- Species
- Star Wars
- Buffy the Vampire Slayer

=== Other references ===
- Spectrum 6 (December 1999)
- Spectrum 8 (November 2001)
- Spectrum 9 (December 2002)
- Spectrum 10 (October 2003)
- Spectrum 11 (November 2004)
