= Mistborn: The Hero of Ages =

2008 fantasy novel by Brandon Sanderson

- First edition cover
- Author: Brandon Sanderson
- Illustrator: Isaac Stewart
- Cover artist: Jon Foster
- Language: English
- Series: Mistborn
- Release number: 3
- Genre: Fantasy novel
- Publisher: Tor Books, Macmillan Audio
- Publication date: October 14, 2008
- Publication place: United States
- Media type: Print (hardcover and paperback), audiobook, e-book
- Pages: 572 pp (first edition, hardback), 27.5 hours (audiobook)
- ISBN: 978-0-7653-1689-9 (first edition, hardback)
- OCLC: 691717141
- Dewey Decimal: 813/.6
- LC Class: PS3619.A533 H47 2008
- Preceded by: Mistborn: The Well of Ascension
- Followed by: Mistborn: The Alloy of Law

Mistborn: The Hero of Ages is an epic fantasy novel written by American author Brandon Sanderson. It was published on October 14, 2008, by Tor Books and is the third and final novel in the Mistborn trilogy. It is preceded by The Well of Ascension in 2007 and followed by The Alloy of Law in the Mistborn: Era 2 series, Wax and Wayne in 2011.

== Plot ==
The Hero of Ages is the prophesied savior of the Terris people, foretold to find and give up the power at the Well of Ascension in a selfless act to save the world from the Deepness. A thousand years before the fall of the Final Empire, the Terrisman Worldbringer Kwaan believed that he had found the Hero of Ages in Alendi, a blacksmith's son who rose to become the last ruler of Khlennium. However, as Alendi's quest for the Well continued, Kwaan discovered that the Terris prophecies had been altered by a mysterious force called Ruin, whose power was contained within the Well. If the Hero of Ages released the power as the prophecies claimed needed to be done, Ruin would be free to destroy the world. Kwaan betrayed Alendi, instructing his nephew Rashek to kill him. Rashek then claimed the power for himself, remaking the world and forming the Final Empire which he ruled as the immortal Lord Ruler. A thousand years later, the Mistborn Vin defeated the Lord Ruler and, tricked by the same prophecies, released the power from the Well of Ascension, freeing Ruin.

Ruin wanted to destroy the world instantaneously but was too weak, as part of his power had been taken and hidden by the opposing force, Preservation, long ago. Freedom from the Well of Ascension enabled Ruin to directly affect the world more, increasing ashfall from the ashmounts and summoning earthquakes to break the world apart; he could also influence people and control entire koloss armies. He used his thousand years of imprisonment to plot his escape and the subsequent destruction he would reap.

The Lord Ruler, in preparation for such an event, created storage caches containing food and water in cave complexes beneath certain cities, each one providing directions to the next. As Vin and Elend struggle to consolidate the remaining outposts of humanity, they hunt for the storage caches, following hints left by the Lord Ruler. As they journey from cache to cache, the world itself begins to crumble with ash spewing forth in greater quantities, blocking out the sun and preventing crops from growing. The mists continue to act strangely, sickening and killing people who venture into them. The last two major unconquered cities are Fadrex City, which has reverted to the Lord Ruler's old structure of mass oppression under the obligator Yomen, and Urteau, a rebel city where the Skaa are free, the nobility overpowered, and a former commoner titled the Citizen rules with increasing violence.

Sazed tries to establish diplomatic relations with the people of Urteau while continuing to struggle with depression stemming from the recent death of his beloved, the Terriswoman Keeper Tindwyl. He studies religions, but has lost his own faith and yearns to find a religion that makes sense to him. He and Breeze work with Spook (who has developed strange abilities due to incessantly flaring tin) to try and help Elend secretly take over Urteau. Meanwhile, TenSoon the kandra is imprisoned and sentenced to death by the kandra elders, while still trying to convince them that the kandra prophecies of the world ending are now happening, and that they must work together with the humans to save the world.

Vin and Elend try to conquer Fadrex City and discover more about how their world works; they uncover strange patterns in the numbers of people dying after being exposed to the mists, as well as secrets regarding the art of Hemalurgy, which is used to create the koloss, the kandra, and the Inquisitors. Fearing that Ruin will discover their plans, they are unable to discuss their findings with each other. Yomen, the King of Fadrex City, captures Vin during a botched infiltration mission. Elend, left without any choice, takes another koloss army under his control, but the last remnants of Preservation appear to him, warning him to not attack the city. Shortly after, Preservation finally dies. Just before the koloss attack, Vin escapes Yomen's captivity, and Ruin reveals his ability to seize ultimate control over the koloss. Ruin turns the koloss against Elend and Yomen's human armies, but before he can destroy them, Vin leads Ruin's attention and armies away to Luthadel. There, Marsh and the remaining Inquisitors (who are under Ruin's control) battle Vin. On the verge of her death, Marsh briefly reasserts control and removes Vin's earring (which is actually a Hemalurgic spike), allowing Vin to draw upon the true power of the mists, Preservation's power. Vin ascends to become Preservation, trapped with Ruin upon another plane of existence, watching the world.

The kandra finally accept their doom, and Sazed finds his faith in the ancient Terris religion and the Hero of Ages. Urteau is saved, at a great physical cost to Spook, who has discovered that Ruin was influencing him with Hemalurgy. Elend leads the last of humanity to the kandra homeland, the Pits of Hathsin, where Ruin's power, or body, has been stored. Ruin has been fooling Vin and Elend into leading him to his body, which turns out to be the atium stash hidden in the kandra homeland all along. Surrounded and outnumbered, Elend realizes that the mists have been Snapping Mistings, and that he has been provided with an army of atium Mistings. He leads a desperate battle against the koloss in vain. Marsh appears again and battles Elend. Though Elend receives mystical aid from Vin, giving him unlimited metallic power, Marsh fatally wounds Elend. As he is dying, Elend reveals that his soldiers have burnt away all of Ruin's body, the atium, in battle, so that Ruin can never recover his missing power. Vin realizes that Preservation gave of himself to create mankind so that mankind would be able to manifest both Preservation's ability to create and Ruin's ability to destroy. Having both abilities within her, Vin attacks Ruin directly, sacrificing herself and Preservation to finally destroy Ruin.

Vin and many others thought that she was the Hero of Ages, but it is revealed to actually be Sazed. One major prophecy, "The Hero will bear the future of the world on his arms", referred to Sazed's Feruchemical copperminds. He uses the knowledge in these copperminds, along with the combined power of Preservation and Ruin, claimed from the fallen bodies of Vin and Ruin, to reshape the world into a new paradise of blue skies, green foliage, and rainbow flowers. Spook, Ham, Breeze, and the other survivors emerge to this newly reformed world, finding Vin and Elend's reformed but still lifeless bodies in a field of flowers. A thick tome is found, written by Sazed, explaining his role as the Hero of Ages, the history of Ruin and Preservation's conflict, and extensive knowledge about the Three Metallic Arts. A note is also left for Spook, revealing that Sazed had made him a Mistborn and healed the damages he had done to his own body over the course of the book, as well as the revelation that there are two metals and their alloys that have yet to be discovered. Under Spook's leadership, they begin their mission of rebuilding society.

== Characters ==
- Vin Venture: a Mistborn believed to be the Hero of Ages. She is Elend's wife and empress.
- Elend Venture: a Mistborn of extraordinary power who gained his powers through a bead of metal found in the Well of Ascension. He is Vin's husband and the reigning emperor.
- Sazed: a Terrisman from the Northern Dominance of Terris. He is a Keeper, and specializes in religion. He is severely depressed by Tindwyl's death during the Battle of Luthadel in the previous books. He no longer wears his metalminds and is trying to find the true religion that can answer Tindwyl's fate after death.
- TenSoon: a kandra friend of Vin. He is facing punishment in the kandra homeland for telling her kandra secrets, and for killing another kandra, OreSeur.
- Hammond or Ham: originally a member of Kelsier's crew and a Pewterarm. Ham enjoys philosophical bouts, especially with Breeze.
- Ladrian or Breeze: originally a member of Kelsier's crew and a Soother. He possesses an aristocratic bearing.
- Spook: originally a member of Kelsier's crew and a Tineye. He has become a tin savant, causing his body to adapt to constantly flared tin. He is the crew's spy in the rebel city of Urteau, in the Northern Dominance.
- Marsh: a Steel Inquisitor who is the brother of Kelsier. Like all Inquisitors, he is now controlled by the force known as Ruin.
- Ashweather Cett: one of Emperor Elend Venture's advisors and former king of Fadrex City.
- Lord Aradan Yomen: the new king of Fadrex City and the surrounding areas in the Western Dominance. He is an Obligator devout to the Lord Ruler, and believed him to still be alive.
- The Citizen or Quellion: the skaa leader of the rebel city Urteau. An extremist follower of the Church of the Survivor, he burns the houses of noblemen and any person with noble blood.
- Ruin: a god-like, seemingly unkillable being that seeks the destruction of the world. He manipulated Vin into releasing him from the Well of Ascension in the previous book.

== Adaptations ==
=== Audiobook ===
An unabridged audiobook version was released in October 2008 by Macmillan Audio and is narrated by Michael Kramer.

A three-part GraphicAudio dramatized adaptation of The Hero of Ages was released between January and April 2015:

Part	Publication Date	Ref
1	1 January 2015	
2	2 February 2015	
3	1 April 2015	

The dramatized adaptation of The Hero of Ages is available in either stereo or 5.1-channel surround sound format.
