= Works relating to Joseph Smith =

There are many works relating to Joseph Smith. These works cover Joseph Smith's his life, legacy, and teachings. Smith is the author of several works of scripture, and several personal histories, letters, and other writings. There have also been several biographies written about him.

== Teachings and writings ==
- Smith, Joseph (1835). Lectures on Faith. Kirtland, Ohio: F. G. Williams & Co.
- — (1902–2012). B. H. Roberts (ed.). History of the Church. Salt Lake City: Deseret News.
- — (1976) [1938]. Joseph Fielding Smith (ed.). Teachings of the Prophet Joseph Smith. Salt Lake City: Deseret Book Company. ISBN 0-87579-243-X.
- — (1991) [1980]. Andrew F. Ehat; Lyndon W. Cook (eds.). The Words of Joseph Smith: The Contemporary Accounts of the Nauvoo Discourses of the Prophet Joseph. Orem, UT: Grandin Book. ISBN 0910523398.
- — (2002) [1984]. Dean C. Jessee (ed.). Personal Writings of Joseph Smith. Salt Lake City: Deseret Book. ISBN 1-57345-787-6.
- — (1989–1992). Dean C. Jessee (ed.). The Papers of Joseph Smith (3 vols). Salt Lake City: Deseret Book. ISBN 0-87579-199-9.
- — (1989) [1987]. Scott H. Faulring (ed.). An American Prophet's Record: The Diaries and Journals of Joseph Smith (2nd ed.). Salt Lake City: Signature Books. ISBN 0-941214-78-8.
- — (1995). The Essential Joseph Smith. Salt Lake City: Signature Books. ISBN 0-941214-71-0.
- — (2000). Larry E. Dahl; Donald Q. Cannon (eds.). Encyclopedia of Joseph Smith's Teachings. Salt Lake City: Deseret Book. ISBN 1-57008-672-9.
- — (2005). William V. Smith (ed.). The Parallel Joseph (1st ed.).
- — (2008). Dean C. Jessee; Ronald K. Esplin; Richard Lyman Bushman (eds.). The Joseph Smith Papers. Salt Lake City: Church Historian's Press. (10 volumes as of 2014, publication ongoing)

== Biographies ==
- Tullidge, Edward W. (1878). Life of Joseph the Prophet. Salt Lake City.
- Cannon, George Q. (1888). The Life of Joseph Smith, the Prophet. New York: Juvenile Instructor Office.
- Brodie, Fawn M. (1971) [1945]. No Man Knows My History: The Life of Joseph Smith (2nd ed.). New York: Alfred A. Knopf. ISBN 0-679-73054-0.
- Bushman, Richard Lyman (2005). Joseph Smith: Rough Stone Rolling. New York: Alfred A. Knopf. ISBN 1-4000-4270-4.
- Hill, Donna (1999) [1977]. Joseph Smith: The First Mormon. Salt Lake City: Signature Books. ISBN 1-56085-118-X.
- Remini, Robert V. (2002). Joseph Smith. New York: Penguin/Viking.
- Smith, Lucy Mack (1902) [1853]. Smith, George A.; Smith, Elias (eds.). History of the Prophet Joseph, by His Mother, Lucy Smith, as Revised by George A. Smith and Elias Smith. Salt Lake City, Utah: Improvement Era.
- Vogel, Dan (2004). Joseph Smith: The Making of a Prophet. Signature Books. ISBN 1-56085-179-1.
- Turner, John G. (2025). Joseph Smith: The Rise and Fall of an American Prophet. Yale University Press. ISBN 978-0-300-25516-4.

== Other historical works ==
- Ash, Michael R. (2008). Of Faith and Reason: 80 Evidences Supporting the Prophet Joseph Smith. Springville, Utah: Cedar Fort. ISBN 978-1-59955-231-6.
- Beam, Alex (2014). American Crucifixion: The Murder of Joseph Smith and the Fate of the Mormon Church. New York: PublicAffairs. ISBN 978-1610393133.
- Bitton, Davis (2010) [1996]. Knowing Brother Joseph Again: Perceptions and Perspectives (2nd ed.). Salt Lake City: Greg Kofford Books. ISBN 978-1-58958-123-4.
- Compton, Todd (1997). In Sacred Loneliness: The Plural Wives of Joseph Smith. Salt Lake City: Signature Books. ISBN 1-56085-085-X.
- Holzapfel, Richard Neitzel; Jackson, Kent P., eds. (2010). Joseph Smith, the Prophet & Seer. Provo: Religious Studies Center, Brigham Young University. ISBN 978-0-8425-2753-8.
- Madsen, Truman G. (1989). Joseph Smith the Prophet. Salt Lake City: Bookcraft. ISBN 0-88494-704-1.
- Neilson, Reid L.; Givens, Terryl L., eds. (2009). Joseph Smith, Jr.: Reappraisals After Two Centuries. Oxford University Press. ISBN 9780199708697.
- Quinn, D. Michael (1994). The Mormon Hierarchy: Origins of Power. Salt Lake City: Signature Books. ISBN 1-56085-056-6.
- Tanner, Jerald and Tanner, Sandra (1981). The Changing World of Mormonism. Moody Press. ISBN 0-8024-1234-3.
- Waterman, Bryan, ed. (1999). The Prophet Puzzle: Interpretive Essays on Joseph Smith. Essays on Mormonism Series. Vol. 9. Salt Lake City: Signature Books. ISBN 1-56085-121-X.
- Welch, John W., ed. (2006). The Worlds of Joseph Smith: A Bicentennial Conference at the Library of Congress. BYU Studies Monographs. Provo: BYU Press. ISBN 0842526366.

== Films ==
- American Prophet: The Story of Joseph Smith (1999), broadcast on PBS and produced by Vermont Public Television
- The Joseph Smith Papers: Television Documentary Series (2008-09), produced by Larry H. Miller for KJZZ-TV
- Joseph Smith: The Prophet of the Restoration. (2005), produced by the Church of Jesus Christ of Latter-day Saints
- Joseph Smith - Volume 1: Plates of Gold (2011) – LDS cinema film, produced by Christian Vuissa
- The Work and the Glory (2004), film directed by Russell Holt
- The Work and the Glory: American Zion (2005), film directed by Sterling Van Wagenen
- The Work and The Glory: A House Divided (2006), film directed by Sterling Van Wagenen

== Fiction ==
- Dougall, Lily (1899). The Mormon Prophet. New York: D. Appleton.
- Card, Orson Scott (1984). Saints. New York: Berkley Books. ISBN 0-425-07002-6.
- Fisher, Vardis (1939). Children of God. New York: Harper & Brothers.
- Lund, Gerald N. (1990–1995). The Work and the Glory. Vols. 1-6. Salt Lake City: Bookcraft.
- Pratt, Parley P. (1844). A Dialogue between Joseph Smith and the Devil. New York: New York Herald.
- Sorensen, Virginia (1942). A Little Lower than the Angels. New York: Knopf.
- Stansfield, Anita (2008). Emma: Woman of Faith. American Fork, Utah: Covenant Communications. ISBN 978-1598116304.
- Taylor, Samuel W. (1971). Nightfall at Nauvoo. New York: Macmillan.
- Young, Margaret Blair; Gray, Darius (2000). One More River to Cross. Standing on the Promises. Vol. 1. Salt Lake City: Shadow Mountain. ISBN 1573456292.
