= Sylvester Smith (Latter Day Saints) =

American lawyer

First Seven Presidents of the Seventy
- March 1, 1835 – April 6, 1837
- Called by: Joseph Smith
- End reason: Honorably released because he had already been ordained a high priest

Personal details
- Born: March 28, 1806; Tyringham, Massachusetts, United States
- Died: February 22, 1880 (aged 73); Council Bluffs, Iowa, United States

Sylvester Marshall Smith (March 28, 1806 – February 22, 1880) was an early leader in the Latter Day Saint movement and one of the inaugural seven Presidents of the Seventy.

== Biography ==
Smith was born in Tyringham, Massachusetts. He was a farmer, teacher, and carpenter by trade. He was baptized into the Church of Christ some time before May 1831. Oliver Cowdery ordained him a high priest on October 25, 1831. During 1832, he served as a traveling missionary on a journey from Ohio to Vermont.

=== Zion's Camp ===
Smith was a member of Zion's Camp in 1834, where in the words of Heber C. Kimball he displayed "refractory feelings." During Zion's Camp he was blamed for "confrontations with Joseph Smith (to whom he was no relation), insubordination, threatening Joseph's dog, arguing with him, and refusing to share bread." Upon the return of Zion's Camp to Kirtland, Ohio, Smith's complaints against Joseph Smith resulted in the only time in church history that the Common Council of the Church has been convened to try a President of the Church. The August 1834 Council, which was presided over by Bishop Newel K. Whitney, determined that Joseph Smith had "acted in every respect in an honorable and proper manner with all monies and properties entrusted to his charge." In September 1834, Sylvester Smith reconciled with the high council and was dropped from the council without protesting.

=== Kirtland life ===
On February 14, 1835, Smith attended the meeting where the inaugural Quorum of the Twelve was called, and three days later he was appointed to the Kirtland High Council. Later that month he was ordained a Seventy, and named as one of the inaugural presidents of the Seventies the next day. He continued to serve on the Kirtland High Council, from which he was released in early 1836.

Smith remained very active in the Latter Day Saint community for the next two years. In 1836, he briefly acted as scribe for Joseph Smith. In Kirtland he attended the Hebrew School, the School of the Prophets, the solemn assembly in January 1836, and the dedication of the Kirtland Temple. He was a member of the Kirtland Safety Society when it was formed in 1837. Perhaps because of disputed preeminence between High Priests and Seventies, five of the seven presidents of the Seventy previously ordained as High Priests, including Smith, were released and returned to the High Priests quorum in April 1837. George A. Smith later reported that by 1837 Sylvester was numbered among the dissenters from Joseph Smith and the church. By 1838, Smith had left the church. At this time, many Latter Day Saints had left Kirtland, leaving Smith behind in the city until 1853, when he sold his land and moved to Council Bluffs, Iowa. There he was a lawyer and bought and sold real estate. In the 1850s and 1860s, he was the county school fund commissioner and justice of the peace. Smith died in Council Bluffs at the age of 73.

== Sources ==
- Black, Susan Easton (1997), "Sylvester Smith", Who's Who in the Doctrine and Covenants, Salt Lake City, Utah: Bookcraft, ISBN 1-57008-292-8.
- Cook, Lyndon W. (1981), The Revelations of the Prophet Joseph Smith: A Historical and Biographical Commentary of the Doctrine and Covenants, Provo, Utah: Seventy's Mission Bookstore. Entry for Sylvester Smith online at "Biographical Registers - S". BYU Studies.
- Hedges, Andrew H. (2000), "Smith, Sylvester", in Arnold K. Garr; Donald Q. Cannon; Richard O. Cowan (eds.), Encyclopedia of Latter-day Saint History, Salt Lake City, Utah: Deseret Book, ISBN 1-57345-822-8.
- Jenson, Andrew (1901), "SMITH, Sylvester", Latter-day Saint Biographical Encyclopedia, vol. 1, Salt Lake City, Utah: The Andrew Jenson History Company, p. 191.
- Jessee, Dean C. (1989), The Papers of Joseph Smith: Autobiographical and Historical Writings, Salt Lake City, Utah: Deseret Book, ISBN 0-87579-199-9. Entry for Sylvester Smith online at "Biographical Registers - S". BYU Studies.
- Jessee, Dean C. (1992), The Papers of Joseph Smith, Vol. 2: Journal, 1832-1842, Salt Lake City, Utah: Deseret Book, ISBN 0-87579-545-5. Entry for Sylvester Smith online at "Biographical Registers - S". BYU Studies.
- Jessee, Dean C. (2002), "Biographical Register", The Personal Writings of Joseph Smith, Salt Lake City and Provo, Utah: Deseret Book and Brigham Young University Press, ISBN 1-57345-787-6, archived from the original on 2008-11-20.
- Jessee, Dean C.; Ashurst-McGee, Mark; Jensen, Richard L. (2008), "Biographical Directory", Journals, Volume 1: 1832–1839, The Joseph Smith Papers, Salt Lake City: Church Historian's Press, ISBN 978-1-57008-849-0.
- Kenney, Scott G., "Sylvester Smith (1805–18??)", Saints Without Halos.
- Quinn, D. Michael (1994), The Mormon Hierarchy: Origins of Power, Salt Lake City, Utah: Signature Books in association with Smith Research Associates, p. 592, ISBN 1-56085-056-6. Biographical details for Sylvester Smith from this volume are cited online by Kenney.
- Roberts, B. H. (1904), History of the Church of Jesus Christ of Latter-day Saints, Volume II, Salt Lake City, Utah: The Church of Jesus Christ of Latter-day Saints.
