= Mark Ashurst-McGee =

American historian and editor

Mark Roscoe Ashurst-McGee (born 1968) is an American historian of the Latter Day Saint movement and editor for the Joseph Smith Papers project.

== Background ==
From 1988 to 1990, Ashurst-McGee served a mission for the Church of Jesus Christ of Latter-day Saints (LDS Church) in New Jersey. Ashurst-McGee received B.A. and B.S. degrees from Brigham Young University (BYU) in 1994, and an M.A. in History from Utah State University (USU) in 2000. During his graduate studies he also did a summer seminar course in Latter-day Saint history at BYU that was led by Richard L. Bushman. His master's thesis on Joseph Smith's religious development won the Reese History Award from the Mormon History Association (MHA). He then pursued a doctorate in history at Arizona State University (ASU), where he also worked on a project for American Indian history and culture. His dissertation was on Joseph Smith's early social and political thought, and won the Gerald E. Jones Dissertation Award from the MHA. Through this training, he became a "specialist in documentary editing conventions and transcription methodology." A BYU professor of religious education and colleague in the Joseph Smith Papers Project, Steven C. Harper, stated Ashurst-McGee "probably knows the field of documentary editing better than anybody that I know."

== Mormon studies ==
In 1999, Ashurst-McGee was an intern in the LDS Church's archives. After his time at ASU, he joined the staff of the Joseph Fielding Smith Institute for Latter-day Saint History at BYU. He also worked as an editor for Deseret Book and published articles with the Foundation for Ancient Research and Mormon Studies (FARMS) and the MHA.

When FARMS printed a coordinated critique of Grant H. Palmer's controversial 2002 book, An Insider's View of Mormon Origins, Ashurst-McGee wrote one of the five critiques published in the FARMS Review. The other reviewers were James B. Allen, Davis Bitton, Louis Midgley, and Steven C. Harper.

Ashurst-McGee is a member of the Joseph Smith Papers Project. Along with Richard L. Jensen and Dean C. Jessee, he co-edited the first volume to be published from the series, which was on the early journals of Joseph Smith. Released in 2008, the book became popular and sold quickly, prompting expanded additional printings. In 2009, it received the Steven F. Christensen Best Documentary Award (from MHA) and a Special Award in Textual Criticism and Bibliography (Association for Mormon Letters).

== Work ==
- Ashurst-McGee, Mark (1999). "The Josiah Stowell Jr.-John S. Fullmer Correspondence". BYU Studies. 38 (3): 108–117.
- —— (2000). A Pathway to Prophethood: Joseph Smith as Rodsman, Village Seer, and Judeo-Christian Prophet. [master's thesis]. Utah State University..
- —— (Fall 2001). "Moroni: Angel or Treasure Guardian?". Mormon Historical Studies. 2 (2): 39–75.
- —— (2001). "Mormonism's Encounter with the Michigan Relics" (PDF). BYU Studies. 40 (3): 174–209.
- —— (2003). "A One-sided View of Mormon Origins". FARMS Review. 15 (2).
- —— (2006). "Moroni as Angel and as Treasure Guardian". FARMS Review. 18 (1).
- ——; Smith, Alex (December 2007). "The Joseph Smith Journals". Ensign.
- —— (2008). Zion Rising: Joseph Smith's Early Social and Political Thought. [doctoral dissertation]. Arizona State University.
- Smith, Joseph Jr. (2008). Jessee, Dean C.; ——; Jensen, Richard L. (eds.). Journals, Volume 1: 1832–1839. The Joseph Smith Papers. Salt Lake City: Church Historian's Press. ISBN 978-1-57008-849-0.

== Sources ==
- Biography at Joseph Smith Papers Project website (accessed May 4, 2012)
- Maxwell Institute listing
- University of Utah papers listing
