= Dean C. Jessee =

American historian on the LDS Church (1929–2025)

Dean Cornell Jessee (August 29, 1929 – December 31, 2025) was an American historian of the early Latter Day Saint movement and leading expert on the writings of Joseph Smith Jr.

== Life and career ==
Jessee was born on August 29, 1929, one of the sons of Phillip Cornell Jessee and Minerva Boss. He was born and raised in Springville, Utah as a member of the Church of Jesus Christ of Latter-day Saints (LDS Church). He served an LDS mission to Germany.

In 1959, Jessee received his Master of Arts in LDS church history from the College of Religion at Brigham Young University (BYU), writing his thesis on the controversial topic of Mormon fundamentalism (D. Michael Quinn claims BYU restricted access to this paper for several years). He then taught LDS Seminary for four years at West High School in Salt Lake City.

In his career, Jesse was a respected archivist, editor and historian, as well as an authority on early Mormon handwriting. Davis Bitton called him one of the "[Mormon] historians who are deeply familiar with the sources on Mormon origins [yet] still find it possible to remain in the fold." In addition to his mission, Jessee has served in his local Salt Lake City congregation as a home teacher and counselor of the high priest group, as well as a stake family history coordinator.

Jessee married Margaret June Wood (1935–2013) and they had eight children and reside in Salt Lake City. Jessee's younger brother Donald served in the LDS Church as president of the Oregon Portland Mission and as a Regional Representative.

=== Church Historian's Office ===
In 1964, Jessee was hired by the Church Historian's Office under Joseph Fielding Smith as an archivist in the church historical archives.

While Leonard J. Arrington was researching a book on the Mormon development of western America, he met Jessee in the church archives during 1967. As a cataloguer of manuscripts, Jessee informed Arrington of many useful documents in the archive that historians had not yet studied. Arrington later recalled that at the time Jessee was "Intelligent, well-informed, hardworking, and modest," and that "he knew more about the documents of LDS history than any other person."

In the late 1960s, Jessee was invited by Truman G. Madsen, at BYU's Institute of Mormon Studies, to publish articles on Joseph Smith and early Mormon history in BYU Studies. This began Jessee's research and publication in early Mormon manuscripts and historical documents.

In 1972, Leonard J. Arrington became the official Church Historian. He requested the transfer of Jessee from the archives to the new History Division, a newly created, impressive team of historians for researching and writing of new Mormon histories. One such work, Jessee's 1974 Letters of Brigham Young to his Sons, caused Apostle Boyd K. Packer to bring concerns to the First Presidency about the Historical Department's "orientation toward scholarly work," an early sign of the tension that would eventually lead to the History Division's disbandment. Jessee was also assigned by Arrington to locate, collect and transcribe all of Joseph Smith Jr.'s writings, a work inspired by the Thomas Jefferson Papers of the 1950s and those of other Founding Fathers.

In the 1980s, Jessee was a major player in the Historical Department's examinations of important historical documents produced by Mark Hofmann, which were later found to be forgeries. Jessee was considered the preeminent expert on early Mormon handwriting, especially Joseph Smith's, and he authenticated and defended a number of Hofmann's forgeries, including the famous "Salamander Letter". Hofmann's extensive deception of document and forgery experts led him to be called "unquestionably the most skilled forger this country has ever seen".

Jessee served as a research historian in the church's Historical Department until 1981, when he was transferred to the Joseph Fielding Smith Institute for Latter-day Saint History at Brigham Young University (BYU). At BYU, he was also an associate professor of history and LDS Church history.

=== Joseph Smith Papers ===
As a Senior Historical Associate then Senior Research Fellow, Jessee served for nineteen years in the Joseph Fielding Smith Institute. During this time he continued his earlier work to produce the papers of Joseph Smith. In 1984, he published most of Smith's own writings and many of his dictations in The Personal Writings of Joseph Smith. This research continued to expand into two volumes of The Papers of Joseph Smith, one in 1989 on Smith's autobiographical and historical writings, and the other in 1992 on Smith's journals.

Jessee's efforts were eventually made an official joint effort of BYU and the LDS Church in 2001, called the Joseph Smith Papers Project. This is intended to be a large multi-volume series, including virtually everything written by Joseph Smith, by his office, or under his direction. That year, Larry H. Miller, a Salt Lake City businessman and philanthropist, began funding the venture. In 2005, Miller announced the goal of completing the project by 2015, "while Dean Jessee is still around", since Jessee was then in his 70s. Jessee was general manager of the project along with Richard Bushman and Ron Esplin.

=== Death ===
Jessee died on December 31, 2025, at the age of 96.

== Honors ==
- Best Article Award for "The Writing of Joseph Smith’s History" (Mormon History Association: 1971)
- Best Book Award for Letters of Brigham Young to his Sons (Mormon History Association: 1975)
- Vice-president of the Mormon History Association (1978–79)
- President of the Mormon History Association (1980–81)
- First winner of the Grace Arrington Award for Historical Excellence (Mormon History Association: 1982)
- The T. Edgar Lyon Award for Best Article for "Return to Carthage: Writing the History of Joseph Smith’s Martyrdom" (Mormon History Association: 1983)
- Best Book Award in documentary history for The Personal Writings of Joseph Smith (Mormon History Association: 1984)
- Steven F. Christensen Best Documentary Award for The Papers of Joseph Smith: Autobiographical and Historical Writings, vol. 1 (Mormon History Association: 1989)
- Steven F. Christensen Best Documentary Award for Steven F. Christensen Best Documentary Award (Mormon History Association: 1992)
- Steven F. Christensen Best Documentary Award for The Joseph Smith Papers: Journals, vol. 1, 1832-1839 (Mormon History Association: 2009)
- Special Award in Textual Criticism and Bibliography for The Joseph Smith Papers: Journals, vol. 1, 1832-1839 (Association for Mormon Letters: 2009)

== Writings ==
In the 1980s, Jessee worked on editing some of Wilford Woodruff's journals though he never published them.

=== Books ===
- Young, Brigham (1974). Jessee, Dean C. (ed.). Letters of Brigham Young to his Sons. Mormon Heritage Series. Vol. 1. Salt Lake City: Deseret Book; In collaboration with the Historical Department of The Church of Jesus Christ of Latter-day Saints. ISBN 0-87747-522-9.
- Smith, Joseph Jr.; Jessee, Dean C. (1984). The Personal Writings of Joseph Smith. Salt Lake City: Deseret Book. ISBN 0-87747-974-7.
- Jessee, Dean C., ed. (1989). The Papers of Joseph Smith: Autobiographical and Historical Writings. Salt Lake City: Deseret Book. ISBN 0-87579-199-9.
- Jessee, Dean C., ed. (1992). The Papers of Joseph Smith, Vol. 2: Journal, 1832-1842. Salt Lake City: Deseret Book. ISBN 0-87579-545-5.
- Taylor, John; Jessee, Dean C. (1996). John Taylor Nauvoo Journal. Provo, Utah: Grandin Book Co. ISBN 0-910523-26-6.
- Smith, Joseph Jr.; Jessee, Dean C. (2002). The Personal Writings of Joseph Smith (revised ed.). Salt Lake City: Deseret Book. ISBN 1-57345-787-6. Archived from the original on 2009-10-10.
- Smith, Joseph Jr. (2008). Jessee, Dean C.; Ashurst-McGee, Mark; Jensen, Richard L. (eds.). Journals, Volume 1: 1832–1839. The Joseph Smith Papers. Salt Lake City: Church Historian's Press. ISBN 978-1-57008-849-0.

=== Academic journals ===
- Jessee, Dean C. (Autumn 1967). "[Book review of] Messages of the First Presidency. III, by James R. Clark". BYU Studies. 9 (3): 95–97.
- —— (Spring 1969). "Early Accounts of Joseph Smith's First Vision". BYU Studies. 9 (3): 275–94.
- —— (Spring 1970). "The Original Book of Mormon Manuscript". BYU Studies. 10 (3): 259–78.
- —— (Spring 1971). "How Lovely Was the Morning". Dialogue: A Journal of Mormon Thought. 6 (1): 85–88. doi:10.2307/45227517. JSTOR 45227517. S2CID 254397097.
- —— (Summer 1971). "The Writing of Joseph Smith's History". BYU Studies. 11 (4): 439–73.
- —— (Summer 1972). "The Kirtland Diary of Wilford Woodruff". BYU Studies. 12 (4): 365–99.
- —— (Summer 1972). "A Prophet's Goodly Grandparents". Dialogue: A Journal of Mormon Thought. 7 (2): 58–60. doi:10.2307/45224295. JSTOR 45224295. S2CID 254402783.
- —— (June 1973). "The Writings of Brigham Young". Western Historical Quarterly. 4 (3). The Western Historical Quarterly, Vol. 4, No. 3: 273–94. doi:10.2307/967728. JSTOR 967728.
- —— (1976). "The Reliability of Joseph Smith's History". Journal of Mormon History. 3: 23–46. Archived from the original on 2012-04-14.
- Knight, Joseph (Autumn 1976). Jessee, Dean C. (ed.). "Joseph Knight's Recollection of Early Mormon History". BYU Studies. 17 (1): 29–39.
- Coray, Howard (Spring 1977). Jessee, Dean C. (ed.). "Howard Coray's Recollections of Joseph Smith". BYU Studies. 17 (3): 341–47.
- Jessee, Dean C. (Spring 1978). "Brigham Young's Family: Part I, 1824-1845". BYU Studies. 18 (3): 311–27.
- Smith, Joseph Jr. (Spring 1979). Jessee, Dean C. (ed.). "Howard Coray's Recollections of Joseph Smith". BYU Studies. 19 (3): 390–94.
- Jessee, Dean C. (Summer 1979). "Brigham Young's Family: The Wilderness Years". BYU Studies. 19 (4): 474–500.
- Personal Writings of Joseph Smith (1981). "Return to Carthage: Writing the History of Joseph Smith's Martyrdom". Journal of Mormon History. 8: 3–19. Archived from the original on 2012-04-14.
- —— (Fall 1981). "[Review of]The Words of Joseph Smith: The Contemporary Accounts of the Nauvoo Discourses of the Prophet Joseph". BYU Studies. 21 (4): 529–34.
- —— (Fall 1982). "Lucy Mack Smith's 1829 Letter to Mary Smith Pierce". BYU Studies. 22 (4): 455–65.
- Taylor, John (Summer 1983). Dean C. Jessee (ed.). "The John Taylor Nauvoo Journal, January 1845–September 1845". BYU Studies. 23 (3): 1–105.
- Jessee, Dean C. (Fall 1984). "New Documents and Mormon Beginnings". BYU Studies. 24 (4): 397–428.
- —— (Winter 1985). "The Benefits of Partisanship". Dialogue: A Journal of Mormon Thought. 18 (4): 187–88. doi:10.2307/45225414. JSTOR 45225414. Archived from the original on 2011-08-08.
- Rockwood, Albert Perry (Winter 1988). Jessee, Dean C.; Whittaker, David J. (eds.). "The Last Months of Mormonism in Missouri: The Albert Perry Rockwood Journal". BYU Studies. 28 (1): 5–41.
- Jessee, Dean C. (Spring 1991). "Priceless Words and Fallible Memories: Joseph Smith as Seen in the Effort to Preserve His Discourses". BYU Studies. 31 (2): 19–40.
- Walker, Ronald W.; Jessee, Dean C., eds. (Fall 1992). "The Historians' Corner". BYU Studies. 32 (4): 125–35.
- Jessee, Dean C.; Ronald W. Walker (2000). "Revelations in Context: Joseph Smith's Letter from Liberty Jail, March 20, 1839". BYU Studies. 39 (3): 125–45.
- —— (2001). "'A Man of God and a Good Kind Father': Brigham Young at Home". BYU Studies. 40 (2): 23–53.

=== Other articles ===
- Jessee, Dean C.; William G. Hartley (February 1974). "Joseph Smith's Missionary Journal". New Era. 4: 34–36.
- —— (March 1974). "Your Affectionate Father, Brigham Young: The Prophet's Letters to His Sons (Part 1)". Ensign. 4: 63.
- —— (April 1974). "Your Affectionate Father, Brigham Young: The Prophet's Letters to His Sons (Part 2)". Ensign. 4: 63.
- —— (February 7, 1976). "Cement That Binds". Church News. Deseret News: 16.
- —— (July 30, 1977). "Troubled Waters". Church News. Deseret News: 16.
- —— (August 4, 1977). "Another Secluded Grove". Church News. Deseret News: 16.
- —— (August 20, 1977). "'Spaulding Theory' Re-Examined". Church News. Deseret News: 3–5.
- —— (November 5, 1977). "Death at Winter Quarters". Church News. Deseret News: 16.
- —— (July 29, 1978). "The first 47". Church News. Deseret News: 16.
- —— (September 1978). "The Spirituality of Joseph Smith". Ensign. 8: 14–20.
- —— (December 23, 1978). "Truth Established". Church News. Deseret News: 12.
- —— (April 14, 1979). "Success in Steps". Church News. Deseret News: 12.
- —— (June 1979). "'Steadfastness and Patient Endurance': The Legacy of Edward Partridge". Ensign. 9: 40–47.
- —— (September 1979). "Joseph Smith's Reputation: Among Historians". Ensign. 9 (9): 57–61.
- —— (September 15, 1979). "Monument to Progress". Church News. Deseret News: 20.
- —— (October 20, 1979). "Four Early Calls". Church News. Deseret News: 16.
- —— (November 17, 1979). "Improvised Fonts". Church News. Deseret News: 16.
- —— (January 12, 1980). "Pioneer Strength". Church News. Deseret News: 12.
- —— (April 26, 1980). "An Early Historian". Church News. Deseret News: 16.
- —— (June 14, 1980). "Tests of Her Faith". Church News. Deseret News: 24.
- —— (August 2, 1980). "A Priceless Treasure". Church News. Deseret News: 16.
- —— (October 18, 1980). "Talented Linguist". Church News. Deseret News: 16.
- —— (February 7, 1981). "Seeing His Good Works". Church News. Deseret News: 16.
- —— (April 11, 1981). "One of Many Trials". Church News. Deseret News: 24.
- —— (June 27, 1981). "Heaven's Manifestation". Church News. Deseret News: 16.
- —— (August 15, 1981). "An Initial Impression". Church News. Deseret News: 12.
- —— (April 1982). "Has Mormon History Been Deliberately Falsified?". Mormon Miscellaneous Response Series (2). Sandy, UT.
- —— (December 1984). "Joseph Smith Jr.—in His Own Words, Part 1". Ensign. 14: 22–31.
- —— (January 1985). "Joseph Smith Jr.—in His Own Words, Part 2". Ensign. 15: 18–24.
- —— (February 1985). "Joseph Smith Jr.—in His Own Words, Part 3". Ensign. 15: 6–13.
- —— (July 1985). "I have heard that Joseph Smith didn't actually write his history". Ensign: 15–17.
- —— (1985). "The Early Accounts of Joseph Smith's First Vision". In Robert L. Millet; Kent P. Jackson (eds.). Studies in Scripture. Vol. 2. Salt Lake City, Utah: Randall Book. pp. 301–14.
- —— (1986). "Wilford Woodruff". In Leonard J. Arrington (ed.). The Presidents of the Church. Salt Lake City, Utah: Deseret Book. pp. 117–143.
- —— (1987). "'Walls, Grates and Screeking Iron Doors': The Prison Experience of Mormon Leaders in Missouri, 1838-1839". In Davis Bitton, Maureen Ursenbach Beecher (ed.). New Views of Mormon History: Essays in Honor of Leonard J. Arrington. Salt Lake City: University of Utah Press. pp. 19–42.
- —— (1988). "Joseph Smith and the Beginnings of Mormon Record Keeping". In Larry C. Porter; Susan Easton Black (eds.). The Prophet Joseph: Essays on the Life and Mission of Joseph Smith. Salt Lake City: Deseret Book. pp. 138–60.
- Bushman, Richard L.; Dean C. Jessee (1992). "Smith, Joseph: The Prophet". In Daniel H. Ludlow (ed.). Encyclopedia of Mormonism. Vol. 3. New York: Macmillan. pp. 1331–39. Archived from the original on 2009-10-11.
- Jessee, Dean C. (1992). "Smith, Joseph: Writings of Joseph Smith". In Daniel H. Ludlow (ed.). Encyclopedia of Mormonism. Vol. 3. New York: Macmillan. pp. 1343–46. Archived from the original on 2009-10-11.
- —— (1992). "Woodruff, Wilford". In Daniel H. Ludlow (ed.). Encyclopedia of Mormonism. Vol. 4. New York: Macmillan. pp. 1580–84. Archived from the original on 2010-03-02.
- —— (July 1993). "Wilford Woodruff: A Man of Record". Ensign. 23: 28–31.
- —— (1994). "Woodruff, Wilford". In Powell, Allan Kent (ed.). Utah History Encyclopedia. Salt Lake City, Utah: University of Utah Press. ISBN 0874804256. OCLC 30473917. Archived from the original on 2013-12-02.
- —— (1995). "Sources for the Study of Joseph Smith". In David J. Whittaker (ed.). Mormon Americana. Provo, Utah: BYU Studies. pp. 7–28.
- —— (2005). "The Earliest Documented Accounts of Joseph Smith's First Vision". In John W. Welch (ed.). Opening the Heavens: Accounts of Divine Manifestations, 1820-1844. Provo, Utah and Salt Lake City: BYU Press and Deseret Book. pp. 1–33.

=== Papers ===
- Jessee, Dean C. (August 1959). "A Comparative Study and Evaluation of the Latter-day Saint and 'Fundamentalist' Views Pertaining to the Practice of Plural Marriage". Theses and Dissertations. Master's thesis. Provo, Utah: College of Religion, Brigham Young University.
- —— (1977). "Solomon Spaulding and the Book of Mormon". The First Annual CES Religious Symposium: LDS Church History. Provo, UT: Brigham Young University. pp. 57–68.
- —— (August 6, 1980). "Tidbits from Historian's Office journal". Favorite Historical Tidbits For the First Annual Dinner. Provo, UT: Joseph Fielding Smith Institute for Church History.
- —— (August 22, 1985). "Contributions of Wilford Woodruff" (MP3). What It Means to be a Prophet. time 28:20–46:15. Salt Lake City, Utah: Sunstone Theological Symposium.
- —— (2007). "Joseph Smith and His Papers: An Editorial View" (PDF). Joseph Smith Papers Project. Archived from the original (PDF) on 2010-02-02.

== Reviews ==
The following are published reviews of Jessee's writings:

Letters of Brigham Young to His Sons

- William Mulder (Winter 1974), Dialogue: A Journal of Mormon Thought: pp. 77–80
- S. George Ellsworth (Winter 1975), Utah Historical Quarterly: pp. 190–91
- Jan Shipps (March 1975), Journal of American History: pp. 1007–08
- Stanford J. Layton (Spring 1975), BYU Studies: pp.378–80

The Personal Writings of Joseph Smith

- Richard Lloyd Anderson (1984), Journal of Mormon History: pp.113–18
- Golden A. Buchmiller (September 2, 1984), Church News: p. 14
- (Winter 1985), Utah Historical Quarterly: p. 107–08
- Marvin S. Hill (Summer 1985), BYU Studies: pp. 117–25
- Roger D. Launius (Summer 1989), Dialogue: A Journal of Mormon Thought: pp.142–43
- Ronald E. Romig (Spring 2004), Journal of Mormon History: pp. 221–24

The Papers of Joseph Smith

- Roger D. Launius (Fall 1990), Dialogue: A Journal of Mormon Thought: pp. 203–04
- Roger D. Launius (Winter 1990), Illinois Historical Journal: p. 284
- James C. Bedford (Fall 1991), Journal of the Early Republic: pp. 451–52
- Richard Dilworth Rust (1993), BYU Studies: pp. 339–44
- Richard L. Bushman (Spring 1993), Journal of Mormon History: pp.183–87
- David J. Whittaker (June 1993), Church History: pp. 283–84
