= Historians of the Latter Day Saint movement =

Historians of the Latter Day Saint movement are a diverse group of historians writing about Mormonism. Historians devoted to the history of the Latter Day Saint movement may be members of a Latter Day Saint faith or non-members with an academic interest. They range from faith-promoting historians to anti-Mormon historians, but also include scholars who make an honest effort at objectivity.

== Range of perspective ==
Authors of books on "faith-promoting history" are criticized as generally avoiding more controversial topics in an effort to promote faith among members. This sort of history has generally been endorsed by the leadership of the Church of Jesus Christ of Latter-day Saints (LDS Church), and was encouraged by church apostle Dallin H. Oaks.

"Criticism is particularly objectionable when it is directed toward Church authorities, general or local. ... Evil-speaking of the Lord's anointed is in a class by itself. It is one thing to depreciate a person who exercises corporate power or even government power. It is quite another thing to criticize or depreciate a person for the performance of an office to which he or she has been called of God. It does not matter that the criticism is true. As President George F. Richards of the Council of the Twelve said in a conference address in April 1947: 'When we say anything bad about the leaders of the Church, whether true or false, we tend to impair their influence and their usefulness and are thus working against the Lord and his cause.' (CR April 1947, p. 24)"

"Balance is telling both sides. This is not the mission of the official Church literature or avowedly anti-Mormon literature.Neither has any responsibility to present both sides."

On the opposite end of the spectrum are anti-Mormon historians, which Oaks mentioned in the above quote. Anti-Mormons generally write with the intention of disproving the claims of the LDS Church, sometimes to the point of fabricating lies about the LDS Church. Though such historians would not be considered Latter Day Saints, they could be considered Latter Day Saint historians as the LDS Church is the topic of their research. Many anti-Mormons are, in fact, non-practicing ex-Mormons and therefore may still consider themselves cultural Mormons.

Other historians reject both faith-promoting history and anti-Mormon history, and seek to give a more objective analysis, basing their conclusions on actual evidence, rather than revealing selective evidence to reach their desired conclusions.

== List of Latter Day Saint historians ==
- Thomas Alexander
- Edward H. Anderson
- Leonard J. Arrington, American author, academic, and the founder of the Mormon History Association
- Valeen Tippetts Avery
- Will Bagley
- Fawn McKay Brodie
- Juanita Brooks, American historian and author
- Susan Easton Black, professor of Church History and Doctrine at Brigham Young University
- Claudia Bushman
- Richard Bushman, Gouverneur Morris Professor of History emeritus at Columbia University
- Todd Compton
- Kathleen Flake, Richard Lyman Bushman Chair of Mormon Studies at the University of Virginia.
- Sherman Fleek, military historian, served as Command Historian at the U.S. Military Academy.
- Laura Harris Hales, writer, historian, and podcaster
- Kate Holbrook, Managing Historian of women's history in the Church History Department
- Melissa Wei-Tsing Inouye, Senior Lecturer in Chinese Studies at the University of Auckland
- Steven C. Harper
- Dale Morgan
- Reid Larkin Neilson
- Linda King Newell
- Grant H. Palmer
- Gregory Prince
- D. Michael Quinn
- Jennifer Reeder, Nineteenth-century women's history specialist in the Church History Department
- Jan Shipps, professor emeritus at Indiana University–Purdue University Indianapolis
- Wallace Stegner
- Stephen C. Taysom
- Richard E. Turley, Jr.
- Grant Underwood
- William Robert Wright

Organizations

- Foundation for Ancient Research and Mormon Studies (FARMS)
- Foundation for Apologetic Information & Research (FAIR)
- John Whitmer Historical Association
- Joseph Fielding Smith Institute for Church History
- Mormon Historic Sites Foundation
- Mormon History Association

== See also ==
- Mormonism and history
