= Carol Cornwall Madsen =

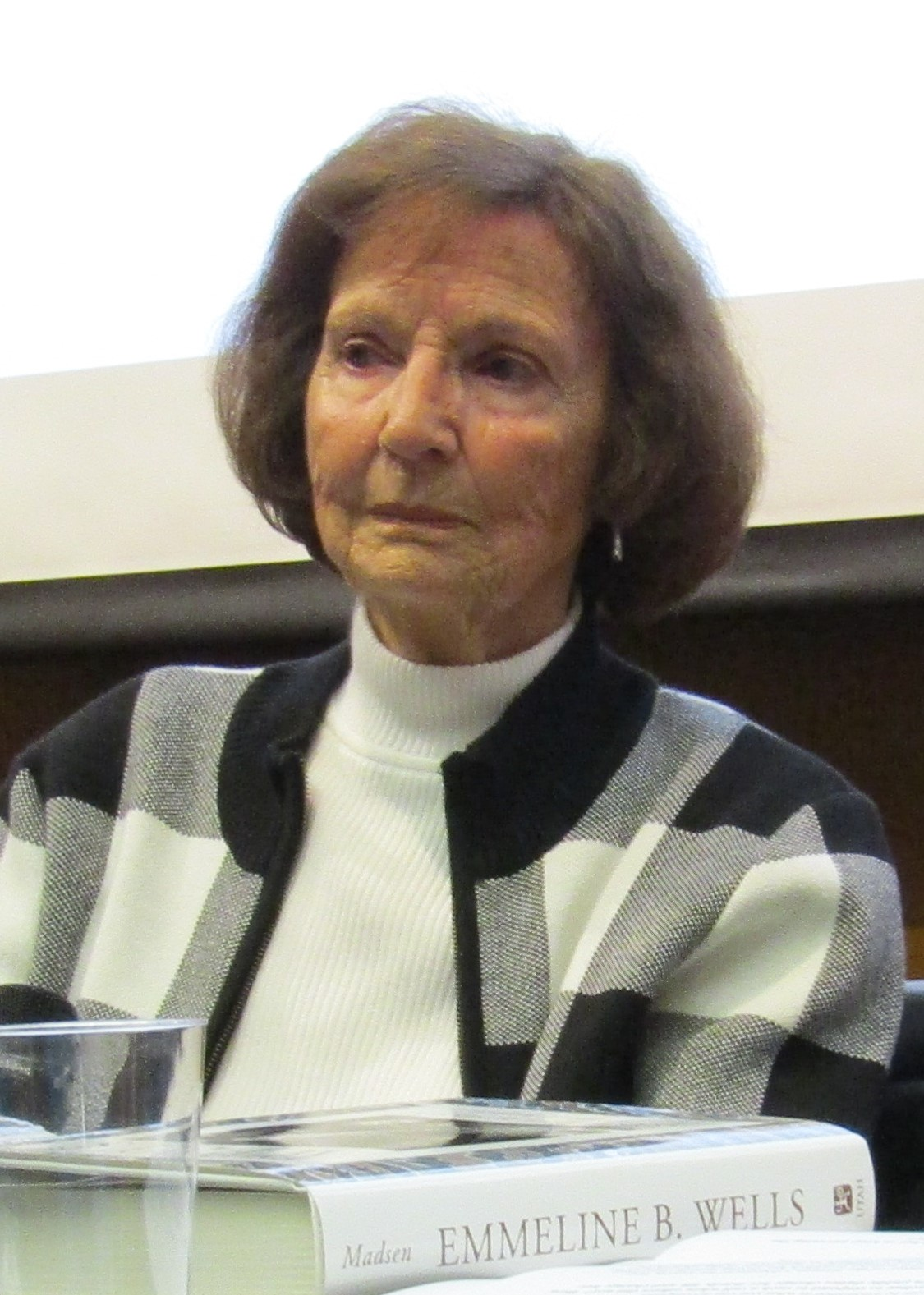
Carol C. Madsen in 2018

Carol Cornwall Madsen (born 1930) is an emeritus professor of history at Brigham Young University (BYU) where she was a research historian with the Joseph Fielding Smith Institute for Church History. She also served as associate director of BYU's Women's Research Institute. She has written 50 scholarly articles and several books.

== Personal life ==
Born Carol Cornwall, she was the youngest daughter of J. Spencer Cornwall and his wife Mary Alice Haigh Cornwall. Her father was the conductor of the Mormon Tabernacle Choir and her mother was a noted soloist. Carol was the youngest of seven children.

Carol Cornwall married Gordon A. Madsen in 1953. They are the parents of six children.

== Academic experience ==
Madsen did undergraduate studies at the University of Utah and took one semester at the University of California, Los Angeles.

Madsen served as an associate instructor in the University of Utah's English department from 1960 to 1967. She then joined the Department of Continuing Education at the UofU in 1967, and in 1970 became an instructor with the Department of Independent Studies, a position she retained until 1991.

After she obtained her MA in history in 1977 Madsen became a research historian with the LDS Church Historical Department. Along with Maureen Ursenbach Beecher and Jill Mulvay Derr Madsen was one of the first three professional historians in the Church History Department assigned to work on women's history.

She then moved to being a research historian with the Joseph Fielding Smith Institute for Church History when it was formed in 1982. In 1986, shortly after receiving her Ph.D., Madsen became an associate professor in BYU's history department. She became a professor in the History Department and a research professor in the Joseph Fielding Smith Institute in 1994. She held these positions until she received emeritus status in 2002 and remained a senior research fellow with the Joseph Fielding Smith Institute until it was disbanded, with various members relocating either to the Church History Department of the LDS Church in Salt Lake City to work on the Joseph Smith Papers Project or to the BYU History Department.

Madsen's most recent book is Emmeline B. Wells: An Intimate History. She has also written a history of the leaders of the Primary. Madsen has a Ph.D. from the University of Utah, as well as B.A. in English literature and an M.A. in American history, also from that institution.

== Professional organizations ==
Madsen served as vice chair of the Utah State Board of History from 1993 to 2001. She was the president of the Mormon History Association from 1989 to 1990. She was president of the Utah Women's History Association from 1979 to 1980, having spent the previous two years as president elect. She has also been a member of the Coalition for Western Women's History, the Western Association of Women Historians and the Coordinating Committee on Women in the Historical Profession.

Madsen has also served on the editorial committee for the Journal of the John Whitmer Historical Association.

== Recognition ==
BYU has a Carol Cornwall Madsen Student Paper Award in Women's History.

== Writings ==
Books by Madsen include In Their Own Words: Women and the Story of Nauvoo; Journey to Zion: Voices from the Mormon Trail; Battle for the Ballot: Essays on Woman Suffrage in Utah as well as An Advocate for Women: The Public Life of Emmeline B. Wells and "Emmeline B. Wells: An Intimate History."

Madsen has also written an in-depth article on Doctrine and Covenants Section 25 and its meaning to Emma Smith over the rest of her life. She also contributed several articles to the Utah History Encyclopedia. Her article "'At Their Peril': Utah Law and the Case of Plural Wives, 1850-1900" was republished in Mary Ann Irwin's and James Brooks' Woman and Gender in the American West.

Madsen also co-authored a chapter on women in the legal history of Utah with her daughter Lisa Madsen Pearson that was published in the book Women in Utah History: Paradigm or Paradox

In 2016, the Church Historian's Press released the book The First Fifty Years of Relief Society: Key Documents in Latter-day Saint Women's History, which was edited by Madsen, Matthew Grow, Jill Mulvay Derr and Kate Holbrook.

== Sources ==
- Dustjacket bio from An Advocate of Women
- "Recent Studies of Mormon Women" article that lists a work by Madsen
- Meridian Magazine article about Cornwall's work
- Meridian Magazine article by Davis Bitton containing praise for work by Madsen.
- Cherry Silver's review of Terryl Givens book on Mormon culture where she cites works by Madsen to explain deficiencies in Givens work
- short bio of and interview with Madsen published by the Mormon Historical Sites Foundation
- article on Women and the polygamy prosecution that cites Madsen multiple times
- 2006 MHA awards listing
- Madsen's vita
