= Steven C. Harper =

American LDS scholar (born 1970)

Steven Craig Harper

Personal details
- Born: 1970 (age 55–56)
- Website: stevencraigharper.com

Steven Craig Harper (born 1970) is a professor of church history and doctrine at Brigham Young University. He was a historian for the Church History Department of the Church of Jesus Christ of Latter-day Saints. From 2019, he is the Editor-in-Chief of BYU Studies Quarterly.

== Biography ==
Harper is a member of the Church of Jesus Christ of Latter-day Saints (LDS Church). He served a mission for the LDS Church in Canada Winnipeg Mission.

Harper earned his B.A. in history from BYU in 1994. While a student at BYU he worked as an editorial assistant at BYU Studies in the compilation of the journals of William E. McLellin for publication. Harper earned an M.A. in American history from Utah State University in 1996, and a Ph.D. in early American history from Lehigh University in 2001. During his graduate studies Harper also took a summer seminar in Latter-day Saint history directed by Richard L. Bushman.

He taught history and religion at BYU-Hawaii from 2000 to 2001 and joined the faculty in the Department of Church History and Doctrine at Brigham Young University in Provo, Utah, in 2002. Since that time he has also served as an editor of The Joseph Smith Papers, working on volumes in the Revelations and Translations Series and the Documents Series.

At the start of 2019 Harper became editor-in-chief of BYU Studies Quarterly.

== Honors ==
- 1997 Grant recipient, Lawrence Henry Gipson Institute for 18th Century Studies, Lehigh University
- 1999 Juanita Brooks Award, Best Graduate Student Paper, Mormon History Association
- 1999 T. Edgar Lyon Award, Best Article of the Year, Mormon History Association
- 1999 Gest Fellowship, Haverford College Quaker Collection
- 2000 Dissertation Fellow, Lawrence Henry Gipson Institute for 18th Century Studies, Lehigh University
- 2002 Research Fellowship, Joseph Fielding Smith Institute for LDS History
- 2007 Lawrence Henry Gipson Institute Guest Lecturer, Lehigh University
- 2008 Class of '49 Endowed Young Scholar Award, Brigham Young University
- 2009 Susan and Harvey Black Outstanding Publication Award, Church History and Doctrine, Brigham Young University
- 2010 Joseph Smith Lecturer, Brigham Young University-Hawaii

== Bibliography ==
=== Books ===
- Harper, Steven C. (2005). Joseph the Seer. Provo, UT: Harper Publishing. ISBN 0-9773879-0-9.
- —— (2006). Promised Land: Penn's Holy Experiment, the Walking Purchase, and the Dispossession of Delawares, 1600-1763. Bethlehem, PA: Lehigh University Press. ISBN 0-934223-77-7.
- —— (2007). The Word of Wisdom. Setting the Record Straight. Orem, UT: Millennial Press. ISBN 978-1-932597-43-1.
- —— (2008). Making Sense of the Doctrine and Covenants: A Guided Tour Through Modern Revelation. Salt Lake City: Deseret Book. ISBN 978-1-59038-921-8.
- Smith, Joseph Jr. (2009). Harper, Steven C.; Jensen, Robin Scott; Woodford, Robert J. (eds.). Revelations and Translations: Manuscript Revelation Books. The Joseph Smith Papers (Facsimile ed.). Salt Lake City: Church Historian's Press. ISBN 978-1-57008-850-6.
- Harper, Steven C. (2019). First Vision: Memory and Mormon Origins. New York City: Oxford University Press. ISBN 978-0-19-932947-2.

Harper has also been co-editor of Prelude to the Restoration: Apostasy to the Restored Church with Fred E. Woods, Andrew H. Hedges, Patty Smith and Thomas R. Valletta. In 2010 Preserving the History of the Latter-day Saints that he co-edited with Richard E. Turley, Jr. was published. In 2012 Exploring the First Vision that he co-edited with Samuel Alonzo Dodge. In 2008 Regional Studies in Latter-day Saint Church History: The Pacific Isles that Harper co-edited with Fred E. Woods, Reid L. Neilson, Craig K. Manscill and Mary Jane Woodger was published.

=== Articles ===
- Harper, Steven C. (Spring 2000). "The Restoration of Mormonism to Erie County, Pennsylvania" (PDF). Mormon Historical Studies. 1 (1): 3–19.
- —— (Winter 2000). "Infallible Proofs, Both Human and Divine: The Persuasiveness of Mormonism for Early Converts". Religion and American Culture. 10 (1): 99–118. doi:10.1525/rac.2000.10.1.03a00040.
- —— (2002). "Drawing Lessons From a Life: William McLellin, 1831-1832". Lives of the Saints: Writing Mormon Biography and Autobiography. Provo, UT: Joseph Fielding Smith Institute for Latter-day Saint History.
- —— (2002). "Van Wagoner's Sidney Rigdon: A Portrait of Biographical Excess". FARMS Review. 14 (1): 261–74. doi:10.2307/44795406. JSTOR 44795406.
- —— (2003). "Nothing Less Than Miraculous: The First Decade of Mormonism in Mongolia". BYU Studies. 42 (1): 19–49.
- —— (2003). "'Pentecost Continued': A Contemporary Account of the Kirtland Temple". BYU Studies. 42 (2): 5–22.
- —— (2003). "Trustworthy History?". FARMS Review. 15 (2): 273–308. doi:10.5406/farmsreview.15.2.0273.
- —— (2004). "Delawares and Pennsylvanians After the Walking Purchase". Friends and Enemies in Penn's Woods: Indians, Colonists, and the Racial Construction of Pennsylvania. Pennsylvania State University Press. ISBN 0-271-02384-8.
- —— (2004). "Elizabeth Harris". New Dictionary of National Biography. Oxford University Press.
- —— (2004). "Endowed with Power" (PDF). The Religious Educator. 5 (2).
- —— (2004). "Thomas Müntzer and the Radical Reformation". Prelude to the Restoration, 33rd Annual Sidney B. Sperry Symposium. Salt Lake City: Deseret Book. pp. 59–69. ISBN 1-59038-329-X.
- —— (2005). "On the Eve of the First Vision". In Susan Easton Black; Andrew C. Skinner (eds.). Joseph: Exploring the Life and Ministry of the Prophet. Salt Lake City: Deseret Book. ISBN 1-59038-471-7.
- —— (2005). "'Assemble Together at the Ohio'". In Susan Easton Black; Andrew C. Skinner (eds.). Joseph: Exploring the Life and Ministry of the Prophet. Salt Lake City, UT: Deseret Book. ISBN 1-59038-471-7.
- ——; Milton V. Backman, Jr. (Spring 2005). "History is People, Places, Sources, and Stories: An Interview with Milton V. Backman Jr" (PDF). Mormon Historical Studies. 6 (1): 99–122.
- —— (2005). "'A Pentecost and Endowment Indeed': Six Eyewitness Accounts of the Kirtland Temple Experience". In John W. Welch; Erick B. Carlson (eds.). Opening the Heavens: Accounts of Divine Manifestations, 1820–1844. Provo and Salt Lake City: Brigham Young University Press and Deseret Book. pp. 327–71. ISBN 0-8425-2607-2. Archived from the original on 2010-06-26.
- ——; Richard Neitzel Holzapfel (2006). "'This is My Testimony, Spoken by Myself Into a Talking Machine': Wilford Woodruff's 1897 Statement in Stereo". BYU Studies. 45 (2): 112–16. Archived from the original on 2010-04-08.
- —— (2006). ""Every Man Walketh in His Own Way": Individualism, Revelation, and Authority in the Ohio Period". In Guy L. Dorius; Manscill; Craig James Ostler (eds.). Ohio and Upper Canada. Regional Studies in Latter-day Saint Church History. Provo, UT: Religious Studies Center. pp. 39–52. ISBN 0-8425-2653-6.
- —— (Summer 2006). "'Dictated by Christ': Joseph Smith and the Politics of Revelation". Journal of the Early Republic. 26 (2): 275–304. doi:10.1353/jer.2006.0026. S2CID 144432177.
- ——; Mark B. Nelson (2006). "The Imprisonment of Martin Harris in 1833". BYU Studies. 45 (4): 113–19. Archived from the original on 2011-06-09.
- ——; Jordan Watkins (2007). "'It Seems That All Nature Mourns': Sally Randall's Response to the Murder of Joseph and Hyrum Smith". BYU Studies. 46 (1): 95–100. Archived from the original on 2011-06-09.
- —— (2007). "Mormon Authority and Identity in America". In Trepanier, Lee (ed.). Democracy, Pluralism, and Utah. Cedar City: Southern Utah University Press. ISBN 978-0-935615-22-7.
- —— (2008). "'All Things Are the Lord's': The Law of Consecration in the Doctrine and Covenants". In Andrew H. Hedges; J. Spencer Fluhman; Alonzo L. Gaskill (eds.). The Doctrine and Covenants: Revelations in Context: The 37th Annual Brigham Young University Sidney B. Sperry Symposium. Provo, UT: Religious Studies Center. pp. 212–28. ISBN 978-1-60641-015-8. Archived from the original on 2010-03-13.
- —— (2008). "The Rich Man, Lazarus, and Doctrine & Covenants 104:18". BYU Studies. 47 (4): 51–54. Archived from the original on 2011-06-09.
- —— (Fall 2008). "'Overwhelmingly Democratic': Cultural Identity in Jackson County, Missouri, 1827-1833". Mormon Historical Studies. 9 (2): 1–16.
- —— (2009). "Oliver Cowdery as Second Witness of Priesthood Restoration". In Alexander L. Baugh (ed.). Days Never to be Forgotten: Oliver Cowdery (PDF). Provo and Salt Lake City, Utah: Religious Studies Center, Brigham Young University and Deseret Book. pp. 73–90. ISBN 978-0-8425-2742-2.

== Sources ==
- BYU faculty website
- Harper's publications with the Maxwell Institute
- Steven C. Harper at IMDb
- Goodreads review of Joseph the Seer
- Biography at Joseph Smith Papers Project website (accessed May 11, 2012)
