= William G. Hartley =

American historian

William George Hartley (born 10 February 1942; died 10 April 2018) was an American historian and author. He wrote many books primarily on family history research, histories of specific families and 19th-century Latter-day Saint history.

== Biography ==
Hartley graduated from Arroyo High School in San Lorenzo, California in 1960. He served a mission for the Church of Jesus Christ of Latter-day Saints (LDS Church) in the Eastern States Mission and the Cumorah Mission from 1962 to 1964.

Hartley received both his bachelor's and master's degrees from Brigham Young University (BYU). He did course work towards a Ph.D. at Washington State University.

Hartley was a member of the LDS Church, for which he served as a member of a stake high council, a Sunday school teacher and a counselor in an elders quorum presidency. He also served for a time as bishop of the Sandy 37th Ward.

Hartley and his wife, the former Linda Perry, are the parents of six children.

=== Historical work ===
In 1972 Hartley began working at the Church History Department and served for a time as a director of the James H. Moyle oral history project.

In 1980, Hartley transferred to the newly created Joseph Fielding Smith Institute for Latter-day Saint History at BYU and was appointed associate professor of history. He also served as director of the Family History and Genealogy Research Center at BYU. Besides teaching courses at both BYU and its Salt Lake Center, Hartley also taught at the LDS Institute of Religion located adjacent to the University of Utah.

Hartley was active in the Mormon History Association and served as its president in 2000–2001.

At the time of his death, Hartley was working on the Joseph Smith Papers Project. He had served as an editor of the first Documents volume with Grant Underwood and Robert Woodford.

== Published work ==
Hartley's book My Best For the Kingdom: John Lowe Butler, Mormon Frontiersman won an award from the Association for Mormon Letters in 1994. Hartley's Anson Bowen Call: Bishop of Colonia Dublan, which he coauthored with Lorna Call Alder and H. Lane Johnson, won the 2008 Mormon History Award for best international Mormon history.

== Sources ==
- Association for Mormon Letters awards
- Hartley statement endorsing a book
- Hartley's vita
- Biography at Joseph Smith Papers Project website (accessed May 11, 2012)
