= Jill Mulvay Derr =

American Mormon historian

Jill Mulvay Derr (born September 8, 1948) is a historian of Mormon Studies. She served as the senior research historian in the Church History Department of the Church of Jesus Christ of Latter-day Saints (LDS Church) from 2005 to 2011. She previously served as managing director of the Joseph Fielding Smith Institute for Latter-day Saint History at Brigham Young University (2003–2005), where she was also associate professor of Church History (1998–2005). Her research and publications have focused on the history of Mormon and Utah women, and she is past president of the Mormon History Association (1998–1999).

Derr was raised as Jill Carol Mulvay in Salt Lake City. Some of her publications have been credited under her maiden name.

Derr is a member of the LDS Church. Derr is married to C. Brooklyn Derr, and they are the parents of four children. Longtime residents of Alpine, Utah, they have also lived in Fontainebleau, France, and Tolochenaz, Switzerland.

Jill Mulvay Derr holds a bachelor's degree from the University of Utah and an MA in teaching from Harvard University.

== Writings ==
Derr edited Women's Voices: An Untold History of the Latter-day Saints, 1830-1900 with Kenneth W. Godfrey and Audrey M. Godfrey (Salt Lake City: Deseret Book, 1982; 2000). She also co-wrote Women of Covenant: The Story of Relief Society (Salt Lake City: Deseret Book, 1992; 2000). Her articles have appeared in BYU Studies, Journal of Mormon History, Utah Historical Quarterly, and Dialogue: A Journal of Mormon Thought Her paper on Sarah M. Kimball received first prize in the 1976 Utah Bicentennial Biographies contest.

In 2016, the Church Historian's Press released the book The First Fifty Years of Relief Society: Key Documents in Latter-day Saint Women's History, which was edited by Derr, Matthew Grow, Carol Cornwall Madsen and Kate Holbrook.

The following is a partial list of Derr's published work:

- Derr, Jill Mulvay (1976), Sarah M. Kimball, Salt Lake City: Utah State Historical Society. Published as a pamphlet by Signature Books in 1981.

=== Books ===
- Godfrey, Kenneth W.; Godfrey, Audrey M.; Derr, Jill Mulvay, eds. (1982). Women's Voices: An Untold History of the Latter-day Saints, 1830-1900. Salt Lake City: Deseret Book. ISBN 0-87747-909-7.
- Derr, Jill Mulvay; Janath Russell Cannon; Maureen Ursenbach Beecher (1992). Women of Covenant: The Story of Relief Society. Salt Lake City: Deseret Book. ISBN 0-87579-593-5.
- Snow, Eliza R.; Jill Mulvay Derr; Karen Lynn Davidson (2009). Eliza R. Snow: The Complete Poetry. Provo and Salt Lake City: BYU Press and University of Utah Press. ISBN 978-0-8425-2737-8.
- Davidson, Karen Lynn; Derr, Jill Mulvay (2012). The Life and Faith of Eliza R. Snow. Salt Lake City: Deseret Book. ISBN 978-1-60908-902-3.

== Sources ==
- Open Library listing
- Derr's vita
