= Grant H. Palmer =

American author (1940–2017)

Portrait of Grant H Palmer

Grant Hart Palmer (August 17, 1940 – September 25, 2017) was an American author and critic of the Church of Jesus Christ of Latter-day Saints (LDS Church). Palmer taught seminaries and institutes of religion for thirty-four years in the Church Educational System, and served as a chaplain at the Salt Lake County jail for thirteen years. In 2002 Signature Books published Grant's book, An Insider's View of Mormon Origins, in which Grant scrutinized many of Mormonism's foundational stories. Grant went on to publish two additional books, The Incomparable Christ in 2005, and Restoring Christ: Leaving Mormon Jesus for Jesus of the Gospels.

== Biography ==
Palmer received his M.A. in American history from Brigham Young University (BYU) in 1968, writing his thesis on the Godbeite movement. He pursued doctoral studies from 1974 to 1975, but did not complete them. During his career Palmer was active in the Mormon History Association.

Palmer's wife died of cancer in late 1992. He later remarried the former Connie Christensen and they lived in Sandy, Utah. After retiring Palmer worked as a real estate developer. He died on September 25, 2017.

=== Career ===
Initially, Palmer was hired to teach history at the Church College of New Zealand. Shortly later he began teaching religion, which led to a 34-year career in the Church Educational System (CES). He was director of the LDS Institute of Religion in Whittier, California (1970–73) followed by Chico, California (1975–80). Returning to Utah, he then taught LDS seminary at East High School in 1980 and at Brighton High School from 1980 to 1988.

During this time the infamous Salamander Letter surfaced, challenging the orthodox story of Mormon beginnings, though the letter was eventually found to be a forgery. As an ardent student of LDS history the letter caused Palmer to consider the influences of American folk magic on Joseph Smith's religious practices. In 1985 Palmer's research on this issue led him to write and circulate a manuscript called "New York Mormonism" under the pseudonym "Paul Pry, Jr." which became the first draft of An Insider's View of Mormon Origins.

As he grew uneasy with some aspects of LDS history, Palmer approached his CES supervisor about changing positions to teach adults at the Salt Lake County Jail. Teaching more general Christian and Biblical lessons of faith and ethics to all inmates, he was the jail's chaplain and director of its Institute program from 1988 until his 2001 retirement. He also served on the board of directors of the Salt Lake Legal Defenders Association.

After completing his long-coming manuscript, he published the controversial book An Insider's View of Mormon Origins with Signature Books in 2002, in which Palmer challenged the orthodox teachings of Mormonism's beginnings. Palmer's prison teaching led him to write another book, The Incomparable Jesus, published by Greg Kofford Books in 2005.

In 2003 An Insider's View was criticized by BYU's Foundation for Ancient Research and Mormon Studies (FARMS) in reviews written by Daniel C. Peterson, Davis Bitton, Steven C. Harper, Mark Ashurst-McGee, and Louis Midgley. These were published in the FARMS Review alongside an official statement from BYU's Joseph Fielding Smith Institute for Latter-day Saint History disagreeing with Palmer's conclusions. In the following Review issue, historian James B. Allen published another critical review.

=== Church discipline ===
Palmer asserts that he was disfellowshipped from the LDS Church in December 2004 as a result of his book, An Insider's View of Mormon Origins, which was skeptical of Mormonism's claimed origins. Being disfellowshipped results in probational loss of some church privileges without being forced to leave the church.

Palmer concluded that while he liked many of the teachings of Joseph Smith, "the foundational events in church history are too problematic to ignore". He found that much of what Latter Day Saints take for granted as literal history has, over the years, been modified to emphasize certain aspects over others. This, he believes, has resulted in an inaccurate picture of LDS Church history.

Palmer argues also that the 'Mormon Jesus' is very different from the current Christian Jesus due to the modern practices of the LDS Church such as tithing, avoidance of alcoholic beverages, and use of special clothing.

At the time of his disfellowshipment, Palmer stated that he still loved the church, and was pleased he was not excommunicated. He also stated that he no longer attended church meetings specifically to avoid offending other members with his opinions as well as due to his rejection of standard LDS beliefs.

=== Afterward ===
Critics of the LDS Church, and Palmer himself, have compared the disfellowshipment of Grant Palmer to the trial of Galileo Galilei by the Roman Catholic Church.

In May 2006, a four-part interview of Grant Palmer was featured on John Dehlin's podcast Mormon Stories. This interview was followed in January 2007 with a five-part interview of Richard Bushman, historian and author of Joseph Smith: Rough Stone Rolling, with Bushman's LDS-believing views presented in contrast to Palmer's skeptical take on Mormon origins. Palmer and Bushman were also among the wide range of people interviewed in the 2007 PBS documentary The Mormons.

In 2008 Palmer wrote an article in The Salt Lake Tribune comparing the Mormon and Catholic Churches to the Pharisees, whose observance of strict laws and oral traditions was decried by Jesus. Palmer believed that, instead, a true belief in Christian religion is centered in individually becoming good and loving people.

In 2010, Palmer resigned his membership in the LDS Church.

Palmer stated in a Mormon Stories interview in 2012 that due to the publication of a two and half page article in 2010, "Religious feeling and truth", for an obscure Baptist journal in Kansas City, a second disciplinary council was scheduled but Palmer handed in his resignation before the hearing was held. Several reasons led to his decision, mainly, that the first disciplinary council lasted an exhausting seven hours and he did not want to repeat that experience and also that the presiding authority of the second council let him know beforehand that to stay a member and avoid excommunication he would need to repudiate all of the details from his book and also regain his testimony of the church.

After learning that Palmer had terminal cancer, the Open Stories Foundation organized celebration of the life and works of Palmer February 15, 2017. He died on September 25, 2017.

== Publications ==
- Palmer, Grant (1968-01-01). "The Godbeite Movement: A Dissent Against Temporal Control". Theses and Dissertations. Provo, Utah..
- —— (2002). An Insider's View of Mormon Origins. Salt Lake City: Signature Books. ISBN 1-56085-157-0.
- —— (2005). The Incomparable Jesus. Salt Lake City: Greg Kofford Books. ISBN 978-1-58958-092-3.
- —— (March 2007). "The "Born Again" Saint" (PDF). Sunstone (145): 70–71.
- —— (March 1, 2008). "Jesus stressed kind behavior, not rituals, to get to heaven". The Salt Lake Tribune.
- —— (Spring 2010). "Religious Feeling and Truth". Midwestern Journal of Theology: 115–18.
- —— (June 2010). "My Years in the Church Education System, 1967-2001". SignatureBooks.com. Signature Books. Archived from the original on 2014-03-02.
- —— (June 2010). "Notes on 'The Golden Pot'". SignatureBooks.com. Signature Books. Archived from the original on 2014-03-02.
- —— (Fall–Winter 2012). "Why William and Jane Law Left the LDS Church in 1844". John Whitmer Historical Association Journal. 32 (2): 43–51.
- —— (Fall–Winter 2012). "Did Joseph Smith Commit Treason in His Quest for Political Empire in 1844?". John Whitmer Historical Association Journal. 32 (2): 52–58.
- —— (July 18, 2017). Restoring Christ: Leaving Mormon Jesus for Jesus of the Gospels.
