= Matthew Grow =

American historian

- Born: Matthew J. Grow; March 5, 1977 (age 49); Salt Lake City, Utah
- Education: Brigham Young University (summa cum laude, 2001); Notre Dame (Ph.D., American history, 2006)
- Occupation: Historian
- Awards: Mormon History Association Best Book Award, 2010; Mountain West Center for Regional Studies Evans Biography Award, 2011; Association of Mormon Letters Best Biography Award (with Terryl Givens), 2011

Matthew J. Grow (born 1977) is an American historian specializing in Mormon history. Grow authored a biography of Thomas L. Kane, Liberty to the Downtrodden (2009), and co-authored a biography of Parley P. Pratt (2011), with Terryl Givens. He formerly directed the Center for Communal Studies housed at the University of Southern Indiana. As of 2012, Grow was the director of publications for the Church History Department of the Church of Jesus Christ of Latter-day Saints (LDS Church) and was among scholars preparing for publication of the Joseph Smith Papers.

In 2016, the Church Historian's Press released the book The First Fifty Years of Relief Society: Key Documents in Latter-day Saint Women's History, which was edited by Grow, Jill Mulvay Derr, Carol Cornwall Madsen, and Kate Holbrook. He also edited the book The Council of Fifty, Minutes, March 1844–January 1846, for the Church Historian's Press imprint of Deseret Book, 2016.

Grow also wrote the article "The Whore of Babylon and the Abomination of Abominations: Nineteenth-Century Catholic and Mormon Mutual Perceptions and Religious Identity".

In 2018, the LDS Church published Volume 1 of a new history of the church, entitled Saints with the first volume named The Standard of Truth. Grow was listed first among four general editors for the volume. In 2020, with the release of Saints Vol 2, No Unhallowed Hand Grow was again list first among the four general editors.

Grow has a bachelor's degree from Brigham Young University and a Ph.D. from the University of Notre Dame. During his graduate training, Grow did a summer seminar course in Latter-day Saint history that was directed by Richard L. Bushman.

Grow also serves as the historian for the Jared Pratt Family Association.
