= Grant Underwood =

Grant Revon Underwood
- Born: May 4, 1964 (age 62); Glendale, California, U.S.

Academic background
- Education: Brigham Young University; University of California, Los Angeles

Academic work
- Discipline: History
- Institutions: Brigham Young University; Brigham Young University–Hawaii

Grant Revon Underwood is a historian of the Church of Jesus Christ of Latter-day Saints (LDS Church) and a professor at Brigham Young University (BYU). He is also the author of The Millenarian World of Early Mormonism and the editor of Voyages of Faith: Explorations in Mormon Pacific History. He is also been named the greatest professor to ever teach at BYU.

== Background ==
Underwood was born in Glendale, California and raised in Anaheim, California. He served as a missionary for the LDS Church in Argentina from 1973 to 1975.

Underwood and his wife, the former Sheree Jolley, are the parents of seven children. In the LDS Church he has served in several callings, including twice as a bishop.

== Career ==
Underwood received his B.A. in 1977 and M.A. in 1981, both in history, from BYU. He received his Ph.D. in history from the University of California at Los Angeles (UCLA) in 1988. His advisor was Daniel Walker Howe.

During his BYU graduate studies, Underwood worked as an LDS Seminary teacher at Thunderbird High School in Phoenix, Arizona from 1977 to 1981. While studying at UCLA, he taught at the LDS Institute of Religion in Los Angeles (1981–86), and later became Director of the Institute in Pomona, California (1986–92). He was then a religion professor at Brigham Young University–Hawaii from 1992 to 1999, where he was elected Teacher of the Year multiple times. In 2000 he joined the faculty of BYU in Provo, Utah as a professor of history and Research Historian with the Joseph Fielding Smith Institute for Latter-day Saint History. In 2009 Underwood was on leave from BYU and working on the Joseph Smith Papers Project.

Underwood has been active in the Mormon History Association, serving on its Council from 1987 to 1990 and on the Board of Editors for the Journal of Mormon History from 1984 to 1987. In Hawaii, he was active in the Mormon Pacific Historical Society and served on its board of directors. In 2007 Underwood created a Mormon studies unit for the American Academy of Religion and served as co-chair.

Having background in Hawaii and Pacific Mormon history, Underwood is a Tour Director for the Hawaiian excursion from the company LDS Travel Study.

== Honors ==
- T. Edgar Lyon Best Article from the Mormon History Association in 1986
- William Grover and Winnifred Foster Reese Award from the Mormon History Association in 1989
- T. Edgar Lyon Best Article from the Mormon History Association in 1989

The Millenarian World of Early Mormonism

- Best Book Award from the Mormon History Association in 1993
- Best Book Award from the John Whitmer Historical Association
- Nominated for the Philip Schaff Prize from the American Society of Church History
- Nominated for the Merle Curti Prize from the Organization of American Historians

== Publications ==
Underwood has also written several articles on a broad variety of topics related to the history of the LDS Church, especially related to the doctrinal views of the LDS Church and its members in the nineteenth century. He has also written Mormon history book reviews for academic journals.

The following is a list of some of Underwood's publications:

=== Books ===
- Underwood, Grant (1993). The Millenarian World of Early Mormonism. Urbana: University of Illinois Press. ISBN 0-252-02037-5. Paperback edition issued in 1999.
- Underwood, Grant, ed. (2000). Voyages of Faith: Explorations in Mormon Pacific History. Provo, Utah: Brigham Young University Press. ISBN 0-8425-2480-0.
- Underwood, Grant, ed. (2005). Pioneers in the Pacific: Memory, History, and Cultural Identity Among the Latter-day Saints. Provo, Utah: Religious Studies Center, Brigham Young University. ISBN 0-8425-2616-1.

=== Articles ===
- Underwood, Grant (Spring 1981). "Seminal Versus Sesquicentennial Saints: A Look at Mormon Millennialism". Dialogue: A Journal of Mormon Thought. 14 (1): 32–44. doi:10.2307/45224956. JSTOR 45224956. S2CID 254398835.
- Underwood, Grant (1982). "Millenarianism and the Early Mormon Mind". Journal of Mormon History. 9: 41–51. Archived from the original on June 13, 2011.
- Underwood, Grant (1984). "Book of Mormon Usage in Early LDS Theology". Dialogue: A Journal of Mormon Thought. 17 (3): 35–74. doi:10.2307/45227937. JSTOR 45227937. S2CID 254397416.
- Underwood, Grant (June 1985). "Early Mormon Millennialism: Another Look". Church History. 54 (2). American Society of Church History: 215–229. doi:10.2307/3167237. JSTOR 3167237. S2CID 162501628.
- Underwood, Grant (1985). "The Earliest Reference Guides to the Book of Mormon: Windows Into the Past". Journal of Mormon History. 12: 69–89. Archived from the original on June 14, 2011.
- Underwood, Grant (Summer 1985). ""Saved or Damned": Tracing a Persistent Protestantism in Early Mormon Thought". BYU Studies. 25 (3): 85–103.
- Underwood, Grant (August 1986). "Re-visioning Mormon History". Pacific Historical Review. 55 (3): 403–426. doi:10.2307/3639705. JSTOR 3639705.
- Underwood, Grant (1986). "Joseph Smith's Use of the Old Testament". The Old Testament and the Latter-day Saints: The 14th Annual Sidney B. Sperry Symposium. Orem, Utah: Randall Book Company. pp. 381–413. ISBN 0-934126-96-8.
- Underwood, Grant (Summer 1986). "Early Mormon Perceptions of Contemporary America: 1830-1846". BYU Studies. 26 (3): 49–61.
- Underwood, Grant (1989). "The New England Origins of Mormonism Revisited". Journal of Mormon History. 15: 15–25. Archived from the original on June 14, 2011.
- Underwood, Grant (1990). "Baptism for the Dead: Comparing the RLDS and LDS Perspectives". Dialogue: A Journal of Mormon Thought. 23 (2): 99–105. doi:10.2307/45228081. JSTOR 45228081. S2CID 254403566.

Underwood, Grant (March 19, 1994). "Frontiers in Mormon Pacific History". Mormon Pacific Historical Society Proceedings, Fifteenth Annual Conference (15): 54–55.

- Underwood, Grant (2000). "Mormonism". Encyclopedia of Millennialism and Millennial Movements. New York: Routledge. pp. 270–274. ISBN 978-0-415-92246-3.
- Underwood, Grant (2000). "Mormonism, the Maori and Cultural Authenticity". Journal of Pacific History. 35 (2): 133–146. doi:10.1080/002233400445751. S2CID 162379545.
- Underwood, Grant (2001). "Supernaturalism and Healing in the Church of Jesus Christ of Latter-day Saints". In Colleen McDannell (ed.). Religions of the United States in Practice. Vol. 1. Princeton University Press. pp. 299–309. ISBN 0-691-00999-6.
- Underwood, Grant (2002). "The 'Same' Organization That Existed in the Primitive Church". In Ray L. Huntington; Thomas A. Wayment; Jerome M. Perkins (eds.). Go Ye Into All the World: Messages of the New Testament Apostles: The 31st Annual Sidney B. Sperry Symposium. Salt Lake City, Utah: Deseret Book. pp. 167–186. ISBN 1-57008-896-9.
- Underwood, Grant (2002). "More Than an Index: The First Reference Guide to the Doctrine and Covenants as a Window to Early Mormonism". BYU Studies. 41 (2): 116–147.
- Underwood, Grant (2004). "Millenarianism and Nineteenth-Century New Religions: The Mormon Example". In Moshe Sharon (ed.). Studies in Modern Religions, Religious Movements and the Bābī-Bahā'ī Faiths. Boston: Brill. pp. 117–126. ISBN 90-04-13904-4.
- Underwood, Grant (2005). "Latter-day Saints in the Pacific: A Bibliographic Essay". In Grant Underwood (ed.). Pioneers in the Pacific: Memory, History, and Cultural Identity Among the Latter-day Saints. Provo, Utah: Religious Studies Center, Brigham Young University. ISBN 0-8425-2616-1.
- Underwood, Grant (2005). "Attempting to Situate Joseph Smith". BYU Studies. 44 (4): 41–52. Archived from the original on June 9, 2011.
- Underwood, Grant (2008). "Joseph Smith's Legacy in Latin America and the Pacific". In Reid L. Neilson (ed.). Global Mormonism in the 21st Century. Provo, Utah: Religious Studies Center, Brigham Young University. ISBN 978-0-8425-2696-8.
- Underwood, Grant (2008). "'The Laws of the Church of Christ' (D&C 42): A Textual and Historical Analysis". In Andrew H. Hedges; J. Spencer Fluhman; Alonzo L. Gaskill (eds.). The Doctrine and Covenants: Revelations in Context: The 37th Annual Brigham Young University Sidney B. Sperry Symposium. Provo, Utah: Religious Studies Center, Brigham Young University. pp. 108–141. ISBN 978-1-60641-015-8.
- Underwood, Grant (2009). "Oliver Cowdery's Correspondence with Joseph Smith". In Alexander L. Baugh (ed.). Days Never to be Forgotten: Oliver Cowdery. Provo and Salt Lake City, Utah: Religious Studies Center, Brigham Young University and Deseret Book. pp. 103–22. ISBN 978-0-8425-2742-2.
- Underwood, Grant (2009). "Revelation, Text, and Revision: Insight from the Book of Commandments and Revelations". BYU Studies. 48 (3): 67–84. Archived from the original on June 9, 2011.

=== Papers ===
- Underwood, Grant (1977). The Meaning and Attraction of Mormonism Re-Examined. ["A University scholar project"]. Provo, Utah: Brigham Young University..
- Underwood, Grant (December 1981). Early Mormon Millennialism: Another Look. [masters thesis]. Provo, Utah: Brigham Young University, Department of History..
- Underwood, Grant (1988). The Millenarian World of Early Mormonism. [doctoral thesis]. University of California, Los Angeles..

== Sources ==
- confetti books entry
- Joseph Smith Papers editor bio
- Claremont Mormon Studies association mention of participation
