= Gordon A. Madsen =

American politician (born 1929)

Gordon Axel Madsen (born July 3, 1929) is a former state legislator and assistant attorney general in Utah. He is currently working as a co-editor of the business and legal papers in the Joseph Smith Papers Project. Madsen is married to Carol Cornwall Madsen.

Madsen was born to Axel A. Madsen and his wife the former Emily Wells Grant in Salt Lake City. His mother died about two weeks after his birth. He was raised by his father, his grandparents Heber J. Grant and wife Augusta Winters (his mother's step-mother) and various six sisters of his mother and their families, all living within just a few houses of each other in the Avenues section of Salt Lake City. Madsen is the younger brother of noted Latter-day Saint scholar and philosopher Truman G. Madsen.

Madsen has B.S. and J.D. degrees from the University of Utah. Early in his career, he served as a district attorney and then assistant attorney general in Utah. He served in the latter position from 1959 to 1964.

From 1969 to 1971, Madsen served as a Republican member of the Utah House of Representatives.

Madsen in 1990 and 2004, published articles in BYU Studies about trials involving Joseph Smith. Madsen has also worked as an adjunct faculty member at Brigham Young University's J. Reuben Clark Law School.
