= An Insider's View of Mormon Origins =

Book by Grant H. Palmer

- Cover
- Author: Grant H. Palmer
- Language: English
- Subject: Mormonism
- Publisher: Signature Books
- Publication date: 2002
- Publication place: United States
- Media type: Print (Paperback)
- Pages: 296
- ISBN: 978-1560851578

An Insider's View of Mormon Origins is a 2002 book about the origins of Mormonism by Grant H. Palmer, a member of the Church of Jesus Christ of Latter-day Saints (LDS Church) who was a Church Educational System instructor and Institute director with a master's degree in history.

Palmer's stated purpose in writing the book was to incorporate recent critical historical and scholarly studies of LDS history in an orthodox defense of the faith. He states that his aim is to "increase faith, not diminish it".

== Overview ==
The book concludes that:

- Joseph Smith mistranslated a number of documents including the Book of Abraham and that he used the King James Bible extensively in constructing the Book of Mormon.
- The Book of Mormon is most likely pieced together from sources that have been established to be available to Smith (King James Bible, local revival evangelism, Smith family biography/dreams, American antiquities; he has later also included the War of 1812 and anti-masonic hysteria to that list); therefore the book is not a translation from ancient golden plates. Regardless, these plates were not used and often not even present during dictation to scribes—instead Smith translated by looking into a hat with a stone placed in it, and he was in the earlier stages separated from his scribe by a blanket hung between them (and later used other methods to distance those transcribing).
- DNA evidence demonstrates that the origin of Native Americans is not as claimed in the Book of Mormon.
- The King James Bible is a source for numerous Book of Mormon stories; many of these stories contain anachronisms and King James translators' errors copied in erroneous form into the Book of Mormon. Palmer asks, "Why would God reveal to Joseph Smith a faulty KJV text?"
- Many theological issues addressed in the Book of Mormon probably derived from Smith's Upstate New York religious environment (as opposed to the golden plates he claimed to be translating from).
- There are more parallels between a published story by E.T.A. Hoffmann and Smith's account of the angel Moroni's visits than could possibly be coincidence.
- In spite of the LDS Church's current claims, evidence shows that none of the eleven witnesses claimed to have actually seen the physical gold plates. Instead, they reported visualizing them "with spiritual eyes" in a prayer-induced trance state.
- Smith's claim to have been personally ordained by John the Baptist, Peter, James and John as resurrected beings, was not at all what Smith originally claimed. Instead, this evolved over a number of years from the original claim that did not involve any beings such as the previously mentioned New Testament figures.
- The LDS Church's official claim that Joseph Smith claimed to have been visited by God the Father and Jesus Christ as two separate beings "is not supported by the historical evidence" either in the number of beings alleged seen or in the year and circumstances as now officially claimed.

Palmer's book suggests that the foundation events were rewritten by Joseph Smith, Oliver Cowdery and other early church officials. This reworking made the stories more useful for missionary work. Palmer asks, "Is it right to tell religious allegories to adults as if they were literal history?"

== LDS response ==
Mark Ashurst-McGee, an LDS member, states that Palmer presents only one side of an issue and only uses evidence that supports his own views, such as using the Hurlbut affidavits from Eber Dudley Howe's book Mormonism Unvailed for the purpose of "overlaying run-of-the-mill treasure lore" onto Joseph Smith's original account of the recovery of the golden plates.

=== Counterpoint ===
Responding to five negative reviews of Palmer's book by FARMS (the LDS affiliated Foundation for Ancient Research and Mormon Studies), Ron Priddis asks: "Is nothing beyond the reach of sarcasm by FARMS polemicists?" He refers to the reviews as "tabloid scholarship".

=== Against Palmer ===
Palmer was disfellowshipped from the church in December 2004. He said he still loves it and is pleased he was not excommunicated. A disfellowshipped member retains church membership but loses certain privileges. In 2010, he resigned his membership in the church and did not reinstate it before his death in 2017.
