= C. Brooklyn Derr =

American academic

C. Brooklyn Derr was the Staheli Professor of International Business and the director of the Global Business Management Center at the Marriott School of Management of Brigham Young University (BYU).

Derr is a Latter-day Saint. He served a mission for the LDS Church in France. He is married to LDS women's historian Jill Mulvay Derr. They are the parents of four children.

Derr holds an EDD from Harvard University. Prior to joining the BYU faculty Derr was a professor at the University of Utah.

Derr is the author of Cross-Cultural Approaches to Leadership Development, Managing the New Careerists (Jossey-Bass, 1986), Organizational Development in Urban School Systems, Managing Internationally with Gary R. Oddou (Harcourt Brace College Publishers, 1998) and Work, Family and the Career.

Derr has also written largely personal reflective essays on Mormonism, both for Dialogue: A Journal of Mormon Thought and for Exponent II. He also wrote the Dialogue article "Outside the Mormon Hierarchy: Alternative Aspects of Institutional Power" in Dialogue 15 (Winter 1982) p. 21-43. He has also written book reviews for the Journal of Mormon History.

== Sources ==
- C. Brooklyn Derr at the MLCA Database
- Greenwood Publishing bio
- Derr, C. Brooklyn. “Messages from Two Cultures: Mormon Leaders in France, 1985.” in Dialogue 21 (2) Summer 1988: p. 98-111.
- Open Library entry for Derr
