= Fiona Givens =

American writer, teacher, and speaker

- Born: Fiona Anne Bulbeck
- Occupations: Writer, Speaker
- Spouse: Terryl Givens

Fiona Givens is an American writer, teacher, and speaker who focuses on matters of history, theology, and culture of the Church of Jesus Christ of Latter-day Saints (LDS Church).

== Biography and career ==
Givens was born in Nairobi, Kenya as the oldest of three children. She grew up in Nairobi, Tanzania, and the Seychelles and was educated in British convent schools. She converted to the LDS Church while in Frankfurt, Germany. She obtained bachelor's degrees in French and German from the University of Richmond and a master's degree in European history.

She was director of the French Language program at Patrick Henry High School in Ashland, Virginia. She also worked in translation services, as a lobbyist, and as communications director of a non-profit organization.

In the past decade, she and her husband have conducted meetings with Mormons questioning their faith. She described a talk given by Dieter F. Uchtdorf on this topic as "the balm of Gilead for many people who are struggling with questions to which they cannot find answers.”

In her 2016 article in Dialogue: A Journal of Mormon Thought, Givens wrote about ancient traditions which associated Heavenly Mother with the Holy Spirit. In 2019, Givens gave a keynote speech at a conference "Women and Mormonism" where she urged the LDS Church “to tap more deeply the potential of a theological framework that has dared to challenge the model of unequivocal patriarchy, both on earth and in heaven.” In March 2021, Givens gave a fireside chat and spoke about Heavenly Mother, suggesting that she was present at Joseph Smith's First Vision. As of May 2021, Givens amicably parted ways with the Maxwell Institute.

== Writing ==
Givens has published essays and articles in Exponent II, LDS Living, Journal of Mormon History, and Dialogue. She is also a frequent speaker on podcasts and at conferences. A longtime collaborator with her husband, Terryl Givens, she is the co-author of The God Who Weeps: How Mormonism Makes Sense of Life, The Crucible of Doubt: Reflections on the Quest for Faith, and The Christ Who Heals: How God Restored the Truth that Saves Us. Their most recent collaboration is entitled All Things New: Rethinking Sin, Salvation, and Everything in Between. She has also written about historical references to Joseph Smith and priesthood keys for women. In 2020, she contributed a chapter on "Feminism and Heavenly Mother" to The Routledge Handbook of Mormonism and Gender.

== Personal life ==
Givens and her husband have six children. She is a member of the LDS Church. After living in Richmond, Virginia, she and Terryl Givens moved to Utah to work at the Maxwell Institute at BYU.

=== Books ===
- The God Who Weeps: How Mormonism Makes Sense of Life (with Terryl Givens) Ensign Peak, 2012. ISBN 978-1609071882
- The Crucible of Doubt: Reflections On the Quest for Faith (with Terryl Givens) Deseret Book, 2014. ISBN 978-1609079420
- The Christ Who Heals: How God Restored the Truth that Saves Us (with Terryl Givens). Deseret Book, 2017. ISBN 978-1629723358
- All Things New: Rethinking Sin, Salvation, and Everything in Between (with Terryl Givens). Faith Matters Publishing, 2020. ISBN 978-1629723358
- "Feminism and Heavenly Mother" in The Routledge Handbook of Mormonism and Gender. Taylor and Francis, 2020. ISBN 978-1351181587
