= Craig K. Manscill =

American historian

Craig K. Manscill is a religion professor at Brigham Young University (BYU) and a historian who specializes in the history of the Church of Jesus Christ of Latter-day Saints (LDS Church), especially during the 1830s. Among other things he has edited the journal of the part of Zion's Camp that started in Pontiac, Michigan under the direction of Hyrum Smith. He is also a sociologist who has done studies on the family in Utah.

== Early life ==
Manscill was raised in the town of Farr West, Utah.

Manscill served a mission for the LDS Church in the Ohio West Virginia Mission as a young man. He received his bachelor's degree from Weber State University in 1978 and his masters and Ph.D. degrees from BYU, the latter in 1987.

== Career ==
Between receiving his two degrees from BYU, Manscill was director of the English department in the LDS high school in Fiji. From 1987 to 1991 Manscill worked in New York City as the director of the Institutes of Religion adjacent to Columbia University and West Point. From 1991 to 1999 he was Manager of College Curriculum for the Church Educational System. He has been a member of the BYU faculty since 1999.

Manscill is a co-author of Our Heritage and was on the compiling committee for many of the books in the Teachings of the Presidents of the Church series. Manscill also served as a historical consultant to Lee Groberg and Heidi Swinton in producing such works as Trail of Hope and American Prophet.

Manscill is a co-author of Mormon Thoroughfare: a History of the Church in Illinois, 1830-1838, Presidents of the Church: The Lives and Teachings of the Modern Prophets (with Robert C. Freeman), The A to Z of the Doctrine and Covenants and Church History and Regional Studies in Latter-day Saint History: Ohio and Upper Canada.

== Personal life ==
Manscill and his wife Jana are the parents of eight children and currently live in Lindon, Utah.
