= Ron Esplin =

American historian

Ronald Kent Esplin (born 1944) is the managing editor of The Joseph Smith Papers project and the former director of the Joseph Fielding Smith Institute for Latter-day Saint History at Brigham Young University (BYU).

== Biography ==
Esplin was born in Cedar City, Utah and raised in Salt Lake City.

Esplin served as a missionary for the Church of Jesus Christ of Latter-day Saints in the Central American Mission, when that mission not only included all the countries from Guatemala to Panama, but also had Colombia within its borders.

Esplin holds degrees from Brigham Young University, the University of Utah and the University of Virginia.

In 1972 Esplin was planning to start a teaching career as an Institute instructor. He was recruited to work for the summer under Church Historian Leonard J. Arrington doing a search and study of Brigham Young's papers in the church archive. He remained working in the Church History Archives until 1980 when Church Commissioner of Education Jeffrey R. Holland announced that Esplin and his colleagues would come to Brigham Young University with Holland who was appointed university president. Esplin received a Ph.D. from BYU with his doctoral dissertation being entitled The Emergence of Brigham Young and The Twelve to Mormon Leadership, 1830-1841.

By 1984 Esplin was director of the Smith Institute and he helped Dean C. Jessee to get The Papers of Joseph Smith: Volume 1 published in 1984. Esplin was also involved in the decision to entirely revamp the project. In 2001 he left BYU and took over as director of the papers project full-time. However, from 2001 to 2005 the project was operating at BYU. In 2005 it relocated to the Church Archives (part of the Church History Department) in Salt Lake City.

Esplin's research has focused on the early period of the history of The Church of Jesus Christ of Latter-day Saints particularly the role of Brigham Young during the presidency of Joseph Smith. Esplin was among the contributors to the Atlas of Mormonism and the Encyclopedia of Mormonism. Esplin was also one of fourteen editors working on the project under Daniel H. Ludlow.

Besides directing the Smith Institute, Esplin also taught classes in Church History at BYU.

As managing editor of the Joseph Smith papers project Esplin has been working to make it so that once the papers come out they are available in many libraries around the world.

Esplin also served as the president of the Mormon History Association from 2006 to 2007.

Esplin has seven children and has served in such positions as a counselor in a bishopric.

== Published works ==
=== Articles ===
- "A Place Prepared in the Rockies", Ensign, July 1988, p. 7
- "Fire in His Bones", Ensign, March 1993, p. 44
- "'God Will Protect Me until My Work Is Done'", Ensign, August 1989, p. 16
- "Brigham Young in England", Ensign, June 1987
- "Hyrum Smith: The Mildness of a Lamb, the Integrity of Job", Ensign, February 2000, p. 30
- "Utah's First Thanksgiving", Ensign, October 1982, p. 49-51

== Chapters ==
- "Joseph Smith and the Kirtland Crisis, 1837" in Joseph Smith: Prophet and Seer
- "Modern Efforts to Preserve Church History" in Preserving the History of the Latter-day Saints
- "A Place Prepared: Joseph, Brigham, and the Quest for a Promised Refuge in the West" in Window of Faith: Latter-day Saint Perspectives on World History

=== Books ===
- With David J. Whittaker and James B. Allen, Men with a Mission: The Quorum of the Twelve Apostles in the British Isles, 1837-1841
