= Robert J. Woodford =

American historian of the Latter Day Saint movement (1936–2019)

Robert John Woodford (September 19, 1936 – January 19, 2019) was an American expert on Joseph Smith and the Doctrine and Covenants. He was a teacher in seminaries and institutes with the Church Educational System of the Church of Jesus Christ of Latter-day Saints for many years. Woodford was one of the editors with the Joseph Smith Papers Project and along with Steven C. Harper and Robin Scott Jensen was a volume editor of The Joseph Smith Papers: Revelations and Translations, Manuscript Revelations Books, Facsimile Edition that was published in 2009.

== Life and career ==
Woodford was born on September 19, 1935. He spent much of his career as an institute instructor at the Institute of Religion adjacent to the University of Utah campus. He also taught history at LDS Business College (now Ensign College) and the Joseph Smith Academy. In the LDS Church he has served in many callings including as a Sunday School teacher and high councilor. Woodford has a Ph.D. from Brigham Young University (BYU) in Bible and modern scripture. His 1974 dissertation was entitled The Historical Development of the Doctrine and Covenants and has been considered the definitive and most exhaustive analysis of the textual development of the Doctrine and Covenants. Woodford also wrote a 1975 BYU Studies article which was the first to investigate the life of Jesse Gause, a forgotten member of the First Presidency.

He also taught at BYU for two years, the BYU Salt Lake Center for over 25 years and for a time at the Joseph Smith Academy in Nauvoo.

Woodford and his wife, Narda, were the parents of eight children. He died on January 19, 2019, at the age of 82.

== See also ==
- H. Michael Marquardt

== Sources ==
- Ensign, author bio notes, Aug 1978, p. 12; Dec. 1984, p. 32; Jan 1985, p. 27; Jan. 1997, p. 42; Jan. 1998, p. 12.
- Joseph Smith Papers bio
- Salt Lake Tribune, Sept. 22, 2009
- article about Jesse Gause
- "Church Update", Meridian Magazine – article about the Revelations and Translations volume
