= Robert C. Freeman =

Robert C. Freeman is a professor of Church History and Doctrine at Brigham Young University (BYU) where he has taught for over 20 years. Freeman is the director of the Saints at War Project which he co-founded with colleague Dr. Dennis A. Wright. Research of the project has resulted in a series of volumes documenting the contributions of Latter-day Saints in the military during wartime. Freeman has contributed to eight volumes on this theme including World War II, Korea, Vietnam, and conflicts of the nineteenth century. Freeman and Wright have produced several documentary works on war-related subjects. Freeman and his wife JaNeal have also recently completed work on a history of the community of Springville. Freeman has written professional articles and has presented at professional conferences of historians.

Freeman served a mission for the Church of Jesus Christ of Latter-day Saints in London, England. He earned his undergraduate degree at BYU and his Juris Doctor degree at Western State University. He worked for many years for the Church Educational System and has been a professor at BYU since 1996.
