= Richard L. Jensen =

American historian (born 1943)

Richard Louis Jensen (born 1943) is an American historian who specializes in the study of the 19th-century Latter Day Saint movement in Europe and of 19th-century European Latter Day Saint immigrants in the United States. Jensen received his Bachelor of Arts degree in history from Utah State University and a Master of Arts degree in history from Ohio State University in 1972. Among his writings are Mormons in Early Victorian Britain. Jensen was a research historian with the Joseph Fielding Smith Institute for Church History during its entire existence. Jensen is one of the co-editors involved in the Joseph Smith Papers Project. He edited The Joseph Smith Papers, Journals, Volume 1: 1832-1839 with Dean C. Jessee and Mark Ashurst-McGee, and The Joseph Smith Papers, Histories, Volume 2: Assigned Histories, 1831–1847 with Karen Lynn Davidson and David J. Whittaker.
