= The Joseph Smith Papers =

Documentary editing project to collect and research documents by Joseph Smith

- Cover of first published volume
- Author: Joseph Smith, Jr.
- Language: English
- Genre: Religious writings
- Published: 2008–2023 (print)
- Publisher: Church Historian's Press (The Church of Jesus Christ of Latter-day Saints) (Note: With co-sponsorship by the Miller Family and endorsement from the US National Archives)
- Publication place: United States
- Media type: Print and online
- Website: JosephSmithPapers.org

The Joseph Smith Papers (or Joseph Smith Papers Project) is a documentary editing project to collect, research, and publish all documents created by, or under the direction of, Joseph Smith (1805–1844), the founder of the Latter Day Saint movement. Documents are published online alongside transcriptions and annotations, with selections also published in 27 printed volumes.

The project began in 2001, published its first printed volume in 2008 and released its final printed volume in 2023; as of 2026, the project continues to publish digital content. The Church History Department of the Church of Jesus Christ of Latter-day Saints (LDS Church) sponsored the project; the department's imprint, the Church Historian's Press, published the website and printed volumes.

== History of the project ==
After Smith's death in 1844, a collection of his papers was carried west by Brigham Young and other church leaders. Some significant documents remained with Smith's widow, Emma, and others, such as John Whitmer. Many of these were not published until years later by the LDS Church, the Community of Christ, and independent researchers.

The "roots" of the project began in the late 1960s when Truman G. Madsen invited Dean C. Jessee, then an employee of the Church Historian's Office, to contribute documents relating to Joseph Smith and early Mormonism to issues of BYU Studies. In 1972, Leonard J. Arrington was appointed the Church Historian and he directed Jessee to continue to "locate, collect, and transcribe Smith's writings." This resulted in Jessee's 1984 publication, The Personal Writings of Joseph Smith, followed by the two volume Papers of Joseph Smith, the first in 1989 and the second in 1992. This preliminary publication of Smith's documents was important to the creation of the biography Joseph Smith: Rough Stone Rolling, which Richard Bushman published in 2005.

In 2001, Jessee's project became a joint venture between Brigham Young University's (BYU) Joseph Fielding Smith Institute and the LDS Church Archives. The project was renamed The Joseph Smith Papers and expanded with added funding from Larry H. and Gail Miller. (The Millers provided a donation of $10 million in bonds and additional cash contributions.) In June 2004, the project received endorsement by the National Historical Publications and Records Commission, a division of the US National Archives, ensuring research was conducted according to the highest scholarly standards. The project was moved to Salt Lake City in 2005, when BYU's Joseph Fielding Smith Institute dissolved.

=== Publishing ===
In February 2008, the Church Historian's Press, was established "for publishing works related to the Church's origin and growth." The publication of The Joseph Smith Papers was the press's initial project. Marlin K. Jensen, Church Historian and Recorder at the time of the press' establishment, said the papers project would include "journals, diaries, correspondence, articles and notices. Everything of a written nature Joseph Smith generated, or over which he had oversight." (Note: High resolution images of many of the original documents had previously been published by Brigham Young University Press in 2002 as part of Selected Collections from the Archives of The Church of Jesus Christ of Latter-day Saints. The two volume set contains 76 DVDs of images from 1830 to 1923, including complete images of the Joseph Smith Collection, circa 1831–1844, the Revelations Collections, circa 1831–1876, architectural drawings of the Nauvoo Temple, and several volumes containing minutes from meetings Joseph Smith attended or oversaw.) Prior to publication of the documents, transcripts of the manuscripts were verified three times, and annotation was supplied to provide the historical context for each document.

The first volume of The Joseph Smith Papers, entitled, The Joseph Smith Papers, Journals, Volume 1: 1832–1839, was released in December 2008. Despite the $50 retail price, unexpectedly high demand caused the initial printing of 12,500 copies to sell out in two weeks, and the publishers to triple their projected second printing order to 16,500. Many Christmas purchasers bought gift certificates for the coming printing and some extant copies were resold for over twice the retail price.

The final printed volume, number 15 of the Documents series, was published on June 27, 2023. Even though the print volumes are completed, new content will continue to come and the website will see "substantial work" beyond 2023.

== Volumes ==
Initially, the project anticipated that it would publish around two dozen print volumes, as well as online publication of additional documents not included in the print editions. After the release of the final volume, the printed volumes numbered 27.

The papers are divided into the following seven series:

=== Administrative records ===
The Administrative records series published records relating to the "institutions that were established under Smith's directions" as well as minutes for meetings Smith attended.

- Administrative Records, Council of Fifty, Minutes, March 1844–January 1846 (published September 26, 2016)

=== Documents ===
Contains correspondence, sermons and other addresses, official declarations and pronouncements, editorials and articles from periodicals, early versions of revelations, and "selected minutes and proceedings." Several hundred documents from this series are available on the Joseph Smith Papers website.

- Volume 1: July 1828–June 1831 (published September 4, 2013)
- Volume 2: July 1831–January 1833 (published December 2, 2013)
- Volume 3: February 1833–March 1834 (published December 1, 2014)
- Volume 4: April 1834–September 1835 (published May 9, 2016)
- Volume 5: October 1835–January 1838 (published May 15, 2017)
- Volume 6: February 1838–August 1839 (published September 25, 2017)
- Volume 7: September 1839–January 1841 (published April 2, 2018)
- Volume 8: February 1841–November 1841 (published May 13, 2019)
- Volume 9: December 1841–April 1842 (published October 8, 2019)
- Volume 10: May 1842–August 1842 (published May 4, 2020)
- Volume 11: September 1842–February 1843 (published October 12, 2020)
- Volume 12: March 1843–July 1843 (published April 26, 2021)
- Volume 13: August–December 1843 (published June 23, 2022)
- Volume 14: 1 January–15 May 1844 (published April 17, 2023)
- Volume 15: 16 May–28 June 1844 (published June 27, 2023)

=== Financial records ===
Contains Smith's financial records, including tithing books. While an ebook study aid was published in 2026, the documents from this series are available only online.

- Financial Records: Historical and Contextual Introductions (ebook study aid, published October 20, 2026)

=== Histories ===
Contains Smith's manuscript history, which he began in 1838, and continued by clerks after his death in 1844.

- Volume 1: Joseph Smith Histories, 1832–1844 (published March 19, 2012)
- Volume 2: Assigned Historical Writings, 1831–1847 (published September 25, 2012)

=== Journals ===
Contains the ten journals kept by Smith and his scribes from 1832 to 1844.

- Volume 1: 1832–1839 (December 1, 2008)
- Volume 2: December 1841–April 1843 (published November 15, 2011)
- Volume 3: May 1843–June 1844 (published November 30, 2015)

=== Legal records ===
Contains records of cases in which Smith was a plaintiff, defendant, witness, or judge. Also contains records related to the trial of his accused assassins and his estate's disposition. While an ebook study aid was published in 2024, the documents from this series are available only online, with minimal annotation.

- Legal Records: Case Introductions (ebook study aid, published April 17, 2024)

=== Revelations and Translations ===
Contains the earliest known manuscripts text of revelations received by Smith and published in his lifetime including the printer's manuscript of the Book of Mormon, the published Book of Mormon, and the Book of Commandments.

- Volume 1: Manuscript Revelation Books (published March 9, 2011)
  - Volume 1: Manuscript Revelation Books, Facsimile Edition (published September 22, 2009)
- Volume 2: Published Revelations (published March 18, 2011)
- Volume 3, Part 1: Printer's Manuscript of the Book of Mormon, 1 Nephi 1–Alma 35 (published August 4, 2015)
- Volume 3, Part 2: Printer's Manuscript of the Book of Mormon, Alma 36–Moroni 10 (published August 4, 2015)
- Volume 4: Book of Abraham and Related Manuscripts (published October 29, 2018)
- Volume 5: Original Manuscript of the Book of Mormon (published January 25, 2022)

== Editorial board and project staff ==
The editorial board and project staff are:

Editorial Board

- LeGrand R. Curtis Jr. - Church Historian and Recorder
- Matthew J. Grow - Managing Director, Church History Department

National Advisory Board

- Stephen J. Stein - Chancellor's Professor, Emeritus, of Religious Studies and Adjunct Professor of American History and American Studies, Indiana University, Bloomington
- Harry S. Stout - Jonathan Edwards Professor of American Religious History and Chair, Department of Religious Studies, Yale University
- Terryl L. Givens - James A. Bostwick Chair and Professor of Literature and Religion,University of Richmond
- Susan Holbrook Perdue - Program Director, Documents Compass, Virginia Foundation for the Humanities, University of Virginia

General Editors

- Ronald K. Esplin
- Matthew J. Grow
- Richard Lyman Bushman

Managing Historian

- Matthew C. Godfrey

Associate Managing Historian

- Robin Jensen

Editorial Manager

- R. Eric Smith

Assistant Editorial Managers

- Nathan Waite
- Riley Lorimer

Project Archivist

- Robin Scott Jensen

Document Specialists

- Sharalyn D. Howcroft

Volume Co-editors

- Mason K. Allred, Mark Ashurst-McGee, Alexander L. Baugh, Christopher James Blythe, Gerrit Dirkmaat, David W. Grua, Karen Lynn Davidson, Steven C. Harper, William G. Hartley, Andrew H. Hedges, Christian Heimburger, Elizabeth A. Kuehn, Gordon A. Madsen, Spencer W. McBride, Max H. Parkin, Brenden W. Rensink, Brent M. Rogers, Royal Skousen, Alex D. Smith, Grant Underwood, Jeffrey N. Walker, John W. Welch, David J. Whittaker, Robert J. Woodford.

Production Editors

- R. Eric Smith, senior editor, Linda Hunter Adams, Susan Hainsworth, Rachel Osborne, Sarah Gibby Peris, Heather Seferovich, Nathan N. Waite.

== Awards ==
In 2008, Journals, Volume 1: 1832–1839 received the Special Award in Textual Criticism and Bibliography from the Association for Mormon Letters, and the Steven F. Christensen Best Documentary Award from the Mormon History Association in 2009.

== Related projects ==
From 2017 through 2023, the project sponsored an annual "Joseph Smith Papers Conference" in Salt Lake City. Beginning in 2020 and ending in 2023, the project released a five-series podcast, which focused on certain themes from the church's history.

In December 2016, the project released a study aid titled Joseph Smith’s Revelations: A Doctrine and Covenants Study Companion from the Joseph Smith Papers. Published only as an ebook, the study aid was produced to provide original text and historical context for those studying the Doctrine and Covenants. The project released an updated version of this book in 2020.

Although not an official part of the project, a documentary TV series also called The Joseph Smith Papers was aired in the late 2000s. The two-season series documented the creation of and work involved in the Joseph Smith Papers Project. It was produced by KJZZ-TV in cooperation with the Church History Department.

== See also ==
- Book of Mormon
- Doctrine and Covenants
- Golden Plates
- Joseph Smith Papyri
- Joseph Smith Translation of the Bible
- Pearl of Great Price
- Standard Works

== Bibliography ==
- Jessee, Dean C.; Esplin, Ronald K.; Bushman, Richard Lyman, eds. (2008). The Joseph Smith Papers, Journals, Volume 1: 1832–1839. Salt Lake City: The Church Historian's Press. ISBN 978-1-57008-849-0.
