= Reid L. Neilson =

American educator

Reid Larkin Neilson is the assistant academic vice president (AAVP) for religious scholarly publications at Brigham Young University (BYU). He was the Assistant Church Historian and Recorder for the Church of Jesus Christ of Latter-day Saints (LDS Church) from 2015 to 2019, and the managing director of the church's history department from 2010 to 2019.

== Early life and education ==
Neilson was raised in Orange County, California.

After graduating from BYU in 1996 with a Bachelor of Arts in international relations, he worked for Arthur Andersen and The Walt Disney Company's Strategic Planning Division in Tokyo, where he had served years previously as an LDS Church missionary in Japan. He returned to BYU for master's degrees in American history and business administration, which he received in 2001 and 2002. While a graduate student at BYU, Neilson was part of a summer seminar on Mormon History with Richard Bushman, which ran over several years, and has produced many of the leading figures in the production of scholarly Mormon history in the early 21st-century. Neilson completed a PhD in American religious history from the University of North Carolina at Chapel Hill in 2006. He also completed Harvard Business School's General Management Program.

== Career ==
From 2006 to 2009, Neilson was a professor in BYU's Church History and Doctrine Department.

Neilson started working for the Church History Department in 2009. In addition to working on the creation of books and editing new document collections, Neilson works on the creation of web-resources and historical sites by the department. He is also involved in the dedication of expanded and refurbished historical sites.

In January 2019, the LDS Church announced that he would begin service in July 2019 as president of the Washington DC North Mission.

In August 2022, he began serving as the AAVP for religious scholarly publications at BYU, overseeing three publication groups at the university: the Neal A. Maxwell Institute for Religious Scholarship, the Religious Studies Center, and BYU Studies.

== Family ==
Neilson is married to the former Shelly Anderson. They are the parents of five children.

== Publications ==
Neilson has written and edited more than twenty books. Some of his frequent topics are the travels of Mormon figures, such as Andrew Jenson and David O. McKay. Many of his books have been published by major university presses.

- Peter Neilson Sr.: A Consecrated Life. Community Press, 1997. author
- From the Green Hills of England to the Red Hills of Dixie: The Story of William and Rachel Thompson Atkin. Red Rock Publishing, 2000. Author.
- The Japanese Missionary Journals of Elder Alma O. Taylor, 1901–10. BYU Studies, 2001. ISBN 978-0842524957. Editor.
- Believing History: Latter-day Saint Essays. Columbia University Press, 2004. ISBN 978-0-231-13006-6 Co-editor along with Jed Woodworth, Richard L. Bushman was the author. Author.
- The Rise of Mormonism. Columbia University Press, 2005. ISBN 978-0231136341 Book by Rodney Stark with Neilson as editor of this volume.
- Taking the Gospel to the Japanese, 1901–2001. Brigham Young University Press, 2006. ISBN 978-0-8425-2595-4 author
- The Mormon History Association's Tanner Lectures: The First Twenty Years. University of Illinois Press, 2006. ISBN 978-0252072888 Neilson was co-editor along with Dean L. May.
- Reflections of a Mormon Historian: Leonard J. Arrington on the New Mormon History. Arthur H. Clark Company at the University of Oklahoma Press, 2006. ISBN 9780870623486. Co-editor along with Sarah Prete and Ronald W. Walker.
- Global Mormonism in the Twenty-First Century. Religious Studies Center at Brigham Young University, 2008. ISBN 978-0842526968. Sole listed editor, was contributor or co-contributor of some of the contents.
- Regional Studies in Latter-day Saint Church History: The Pacific Isles. Religious Studies Center, 2008. ISBN 978-0615200378
- Proclamation to the People: Nineteenth-Century Mormonism and the Pacific Basin Frontier. University of Utah Press, 2008. ISBN 978-0874809183
- Joseph Smith Jr.: Reappraisals after Two Centuries. Oxford University Press, 2009. ISBN 978-0195369762
- Early Mormon Missionary Activities in Japan, 1901–1924. University of Utah Press, 2010. ISBN 978-0874809893
- To the Peripheries of Mormondom: The Apostolic Around-the-World Journey of David O. McKay, 1920–1921. University of Utah Press, 2010. ISBN 978-1607810100
- Exhibiting Mormonism: The Latter-day Saints and the 1893 Chicago World’s Fair. Oxford University Press, 2011. ISBN 978-0195384031
- In the Whirlpool: The Pre-Manifesto Letters of President Wilford Woodruff to the William Atkin Family, 1885–1890. Arthur H. Clark Company, 2011. ISBN 978-0870623905
- Tales from the World Tour: The 1895–1897 Travel Writings of Mormon Historian Andrew Jenson. Religious Studies Center, 2012. ISBN 978-0842528207
- Go Ye Into All the World: The Growth and Development of Mormon Missionary Work. Religious Studies Center, 2012. ISBN 978-0842528214
- Religion, Food, and Eating in North America. Columbia University Press, 2014. ISBN 978-0231160315
- Exploring Book of Mormon Lands: The 1923 Travel Writings of Mormon Historian Andrew Jenson. Religious Studies Center, 2014. ISBN 978-0842528511
- A Zion Canyon Reader. University of Utah Press, 2014. ISBN 978-1607813477
- The Columbia Sourcebook of Mormons in the United States. Columbia University Press, 2014. ISBN 978-0231149426. Edited with Terryl L. Givens. Received the 2015 Mormon History Association Best Document Editing/Bibliography Award.
- Conversations with Mormon Historians. Religious Studies Center, 2015. ISBN 978-0-8425-2890-0. Edited with Alexander L. Baugh.
- Rediscovering the Sites of the Restoration: The 1888 Travel Writings of Mormon Historian Andrew Jenson, Edward Stevenson, and Joseph S. Black. Religious Studies Center, 2015. ISBN 978-0-8425-2960-0. Edited with Justin R. Bray and Alan D. Johnson.
- From the Outside Looking In: Essays on Mormon History, Theology, and Culture. Oxford University Press, 2015. ISBN 9780190244668. Coeditor with Matthew J. Grow.
- A Historian in Zion: The Autobiography of Andrew Jenson, Assistant Church Historian. Religious Studies Center, 2016. ISBN 978-1-9443-9400-4 Coeditor with R. Mark Melville.
- Settling the Valley, Proclaiming the Gospel: The General Epistles of the Mormon First Presidency. Oxford University Press, 2017. ISBN 978-0-19-060089-1 Coeditor with Nathan N. Waite.
- A Voice in the Wilderness: The 1888-1930 General Conference Sermons of Mormon Historian Andrew Jenson. Oxford University Press, 2018. ISBN 978-0190867829 Coeditor with Scott D. Marianno.
- The Saints Abroad: Missionaries Who Answered Brigham Young's 1852 Call to the Nations of the World. Religious Studies Center, 2019. ISBN 978-1-9443-9472-1 Coeditor with R. Mark Melville.
- The Annals of the Southern Mission: A Record of the History of the Settlement of Southern Utah. Greg Kofford Books, 2019. ISBN 978-1-58958-652-9 Coeditor with Aaron McArthur.
- Pacific Apostle: The 1920-21 Diary of David O. McKay in the Latter-day Saint Island Missions. University of Illinois Press, 2020. ISBN 978-0-252-04285-0 Coeditor with Carson V. Teuscher.
- Restless Pilgrim: Andrew Jenson's Quest for Latter-day Saint History. University of Illinois Press, 2022. ISBN 9780252086267 Coauthor with Scott D. Marianno.
- Pushing and Pulling to Zion: The Eighth Handcart Company Trek Day by Day in 1859. Religious Studies Center, 2023. ISBN 978-1-9503-0438-7
- The Salt Lake Temple. Oxford University Press, 2025. ISBN 9780190881559 Coauthor with Scott D. Marianno.
- Elias—An Epic of the Ages: A Critical Edition. Greg Kofford Books, 2025. ISBN 978-1-58958-828-8
- Off for the Holy Land: Apostle Francis Marion Lyman's 1902 Tour of the Middle East. Religious Studies Center, 2025. ISBN 978-1-9503-0473-8

== See also ==
- Andrew Jenson
- Richard E. Turley, Jr.
