= Terryl Givens =

Senior research fellow at Brigham Young University

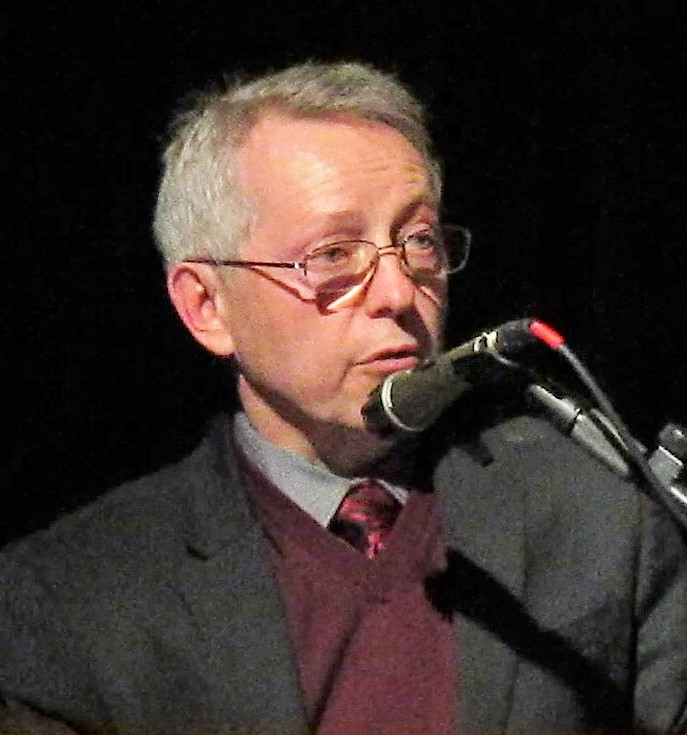
- Terryl Givens in 2018
- Born: Terryl Lynn Givens
- Occupations: James A. Bostwick Professor of English and Religion, University of Richmond
- Spouse: Fiona Givens
- Website: TerrylGivens.com

Terryl Lynn Givens is a senior research fellow at the Neal A. Maxwell Institute of Religious Scholarship at Brigham Young University (BYU). Until 2019, he was a professor of literature and religion at the University of Richmond, where he held the James A. Bostwick Chair in English.

Givens is a member of the Church of Jesus Christ of Latter-day Saints (LDS Church). As a young man, he served a mission in São Paulo, Brazil, and later graduated from BYU with a degree in comparative literature. He did graduate work in intellectual history at Cornell and earned a PhD in comparative literature from the University of North Carolina, working with Greek, German, Spanish, Portuguese and English languages and literature. A longtime collaborator with his wife, Fiona Givens, he is the co-author of The God Who Weeps: How Mormonism Makes Sense of Life and Crucible of Doubt: Reflections on the Quest for Faith.

The New York Times referred to his work as "polemical" and "provocative" while Harper's praised him for being "fair-minded and unbiased."

== Personal life ==
Givens has served in the LDS Church as a bishop in a local congregation.

== Publications ==
=== Books ===
- Dragon Scales and Willow Leaves. Putnam Juvenile, 1997. ISBN 978-0399226199
- The Viper on the Hearth: Mormons, Myths, and the Construction of Heresy. Oxford University Press, 1997. ISBN 978-0-19-510183-6
- By the Hand of Mormon: The American Scripture that Launched a New World Religion. Oxford University Press, 2002. ISBN 978-0-19-513818-4
- The Latter-day Saint Experience in America. Greenwood Press, 2004. ISBN 978-0-313-32750-6
- People of Paradox: A History of Mormon Culture. Oxford University Press, 2007. ISBN 978-0-19-516711-5
- The Book of Mormon: A Very Short Introduction. Oxford University Press, 2009. ISBN 978-0-19-536931-1
- When Souls Had Wings: Pre-Mortal Existence in Western Thought. Oxford University Press, 2010. ISBN 978-0-19-531390-1
- Parley P. Pratt: The Apostle Paul of Mormonism (with Matthew J. Grow). Oxford University Press, 2011. ISBN 978-0-19-537573-2
- The God Who Weeps: How Mormonism Makes Sense of Life (with Fiona Givens). Ensign Peak, 2012. ISBN 978-1609071882
- The Crucible of Doubt: Reflections On the Quest for Faith (with Fiona Givens). Deseret Book, 2014. ISBN 978-1609079420
- Wrestling the Angel: The Foundations of Mormon Thought: Cosmos, God, Humanity. Oxford University Press, 2014. ISBN 978-0199794928
- The Christ Who Heals: How God Restored the Truth that Saves Us (with Fiona Givens). Deseret Book, 2017. ISBN 978-1629723358
- The Pearl of Greatest Price (with Brian M. Hauglid). Oxford University Press, 2019. ISBN 978-0190603861
- "All Things New": Rethinking Sin, Salvation, and Everything in Between (with Fiona Givens). Faith Matters Publishing, 2020. ISBN 978-1953677020
- Mormonism: What Everyone Needs to Know®. Oxford University Press, 2020. ISBN 978-0190885083
- The Life of Eugene England and the Crisis of Modern Mormonism. Chapel Hill: UNC University Press, 2021. ISBN 978-1469664330

=== Edited volumes ===
- Joseph Smith, Jr.: Reappraisals After Two Centuries (with Reid L. Neilson) Oxford University Press, 2008. ISBN 978-0195369762
- The Columbia Sourcebook of Mormons in the United States (with Reid L. Neilson) Columbia University Press, 2014. ISBN 978-0231149426
- The Oxford Handbook of Mormonism (with Philip L. Barlow) Oxford University Press, 2015. ISBN 978-0-1904-6350-2

=== Articles and papers ===
- Mimesis and the Limits of Semblance. Ph.D. Diss. University of North Carolina at Chapel Hill, 1988
- "Blind Men and Hieroglyphs: The Collapse of Mimesis." European Romantic Review 2.1 (1991): 61–80.
- "Aristotle's Critique of Mimesis: The Romantic Prelude." Comparative Literature Studies 28.2 (1991): 121–136.
- "Romantic Agonies: Human Suffering and the Ethical Sublime." Romanticism Across the Disciplines (1998): 231–53. ISBN 978-0761811039
- "'This Great Modern Abomination': Orthodoxy and Heresy in American Religion." Mormons and Mormonism: An Introduction to an American World Religion (2001). ISBN 978-0252026096
- "Joseph Smith: Prophecy, Process, and Plenitude." in BYU Studies 44.4 (2005): 55–68.
- "'Lightning Out of Heaven': Joseph Smith and the Forging of Community." BYU Speeches 24 (2005).
- "New Religious Movements and the Orthodoxy: The Challenge to the Religious Mainstream." FARMS Review of Books 19.1 (2007): 201–221.
- "'There Is Room for Both': Mormon Cinema and the Paradoxes of Mormon Culture." BYU Studies 46.2 (2007): 188–208.
- "'Common Sense' Meets the Book of Mormon: Source, Substance and Prophetic Disruption." Revisiting Thomas F. O'Dea's The Mormons: Contemporary Perspectives (2008): 79–98. ISBN 978-0874809206
- "Joseph Smith's American Bible: Radicalizing the Familiar." Journal of the Book of Mormon and Other Restoration Scripture 18.2 (2009): 4–17.
- "Paradox and Discipleship." Religious Educator 11.1 (2010): 142–155.
- "Fraud, Philandery, and Football: Negotiating the Mormon Image." International Journal of Mormon Studies 4 (2011): 1–13.
- "The Prophecy of Enoch as Restoration Blueprint" Leonard J. Arrington Mormon History Lecture Series, No. 18 : Utah State University Press, 2013.
