= Relief Society Documents Project =

Project by the Church of Jesus Christ of Latter-day Saints

The Relief Society Documents Project is a project by the Church of Jesus Christ of Latter-day Saints (LDS Church) to publish historical documents regarding the history of the church's organization for women, the Relief Society.

In February 2016, the book The First Fifty Years of Relief Society: Key Documents in Latter-day Saint Women's History was published by Church Historian's Press, an imprint of the Church History Department of the LDS Church.

== See also ==
- Relief Society Magazine
- Mormon feminism
