= Brigham Young University Press =

Publishing arm of Brigham Young University

- Parent company: Brigham Young University
- Founded: 1967
- Country of origin: United States
- Headquarters location: Provo, Utah
- Distribution: Chicago Distribution Center
- Publication types: Books

Brigham Young University Press (BYU Press) was the university press of Brigham Young University (BYU).

== History ==
Brigham Young University Press was formed in 1967 through the consolidation of BYU's various publishing activities into one central organization.

In its prime, BYU Press was a robust press publishing in a wide array of subjects, such as interior design, preschools, dancing, and wood-burning, as well as intellectual, scholarly and fine arts titles. In 1974, the press published Roughing it Easy: A Unique Ideabook for Camping and Cooking, by Dian Thomas, which later made the New York Times Best Seller list.

The press also published works for Latter-day Saint readers and scholars, including BYU speeches and symposia proceedings and the periodical BYU Studies. Amongst its major publications in Church history are James B. Allen's Studies in Mormon History series, several of the "Charles Redd Monographs in Western History", the LDS Church's 1965 reprint of A Comprehensive History of the Church of Jesus Christ of Latter-day Saints, Fox and Quinn's biographies of J. Reuben Clark, and Davis Bitton's Guide to Mormon Diaries and Autobiographies. The press itself received a 1978 Special Citation from the Mormon History Association for encouraging and publishing fine Church histories that year. Many of its LDS books have been published in conjunction with Deseret Book. It also maintained the imprint "Young House" during the 1970s.

BYU Press had a reputation of selecting for publication only church approved material. Press officials scrutinized and rejected manuscripts they found too technical or too controversial. These rejections include Dennis Lythgoe's Let 'Em Holler: A Political Biography of J. Bracken Lee, Béla Petsco's Nothing Very Important and Other Stories (1979 AML Best Fiction Award winner), and Science and Religion: Toward a More Useful Dialogue by several BYU faculty. In 1973, BYU Press recalled Thomas Cheney's The Golden Legacy: A Folk History of J. Golden Kimball, a new release, over concerns with some of Kimball's vulgar language. The book was edited and republished by Peregrine Press in 1974.

=== Decline and return ===
Financial troubles struck the press in the late 1970s, leading to a decision for it to only print internal university publications, making it essentially defunct for many authors and scholars. In 1984, the press was replaced by BYU Print Services and has since merged with BYU Mail Services to become BYU Print and Mail.

In 1997, BYU Press returned as a logo under the Academic Vice President's office, intended for use with expanded distribution of some titles to other university libraries. Officials made clear that BYU Press would not be an organization or an office. The return was inspired by the production of new religious texts and the university's desire to clear out manuscripts to focus on publishing the papers of LDS Church founders Joseph Smith and Oliver Cowdery, which were then being developed by BYU's Joseph Fielding Smith Institute for Latter-day Saint History. In 2005, the Joseph Smith Papers Project transferred from BYU to LDS Church headquarters, and began publication in 2008 with a new imprint, the Church Historian's Press, rather than BYU Press. The Church Historian's Press may also publish the George Q. Cannon journals, another project formerly slated for BYU Press.

=== Recent work ===
Some notable recent publications by BYU Press:

- Elwin C. Robison's 1997 book, The First Mormon Temple, Mormon History Association Special Citation winner.
- Glen M. Leonard's 2002 book, Nauvoo: A Place of Peace, a People of Promise, Mormon History Association Special Merit Citation Book Award winner.
- James B. Allen’s 2002 book, No Toil nor Labor Fear: The story of William Clayton.
- Carol Cornwall Madsen's 2006 book, An Advocate for Women: The Public Life of Emmeline B. Wells, 1870-1920, Mormon History Association Best Book Award winner.
- Reid Nielson's 2006 book, Taking the Gospel to the Japanese, 1901–2001, Mormon History Association Geraldine-McBride Woodward Award winner, for the best international Mormon history publication.
- Brandon Plewe's Mapping Mormonism: An Atlas of Latter-day Saint History (1st ed. 2012, 2nd ed. 2014), winner of the Mormon History Association Best Book Award for 2012.

BYU Press has also produced electronic resources from the LDS Church's historical records including Selected Collections from the Archives of The Church of Jesus Christ of Latter-day Saints and BYU Family History Digital Archive. For publication information, contact the BYU Press or Brigham Young University Religious Studies Center (RSC).

== Trivia ==
Before achieving wide notability, and after his own theater company failed, Orson Scott Card worked as a proofreader, then copy editor at BYU Press. In this role he met Calvin Grondahl, whose Mormon-themed cartoons were rejected by BYU Press, yet he would later illustrate one of Card's early works, the 1981 Saintspeak. Card's role at BYU Press led to his later editing job at the LDS Church's Ensign magazine.

== See also ==
- List of English-language book publishing companies
- List of university presses
