= Alexander L. Baugh =

American historian

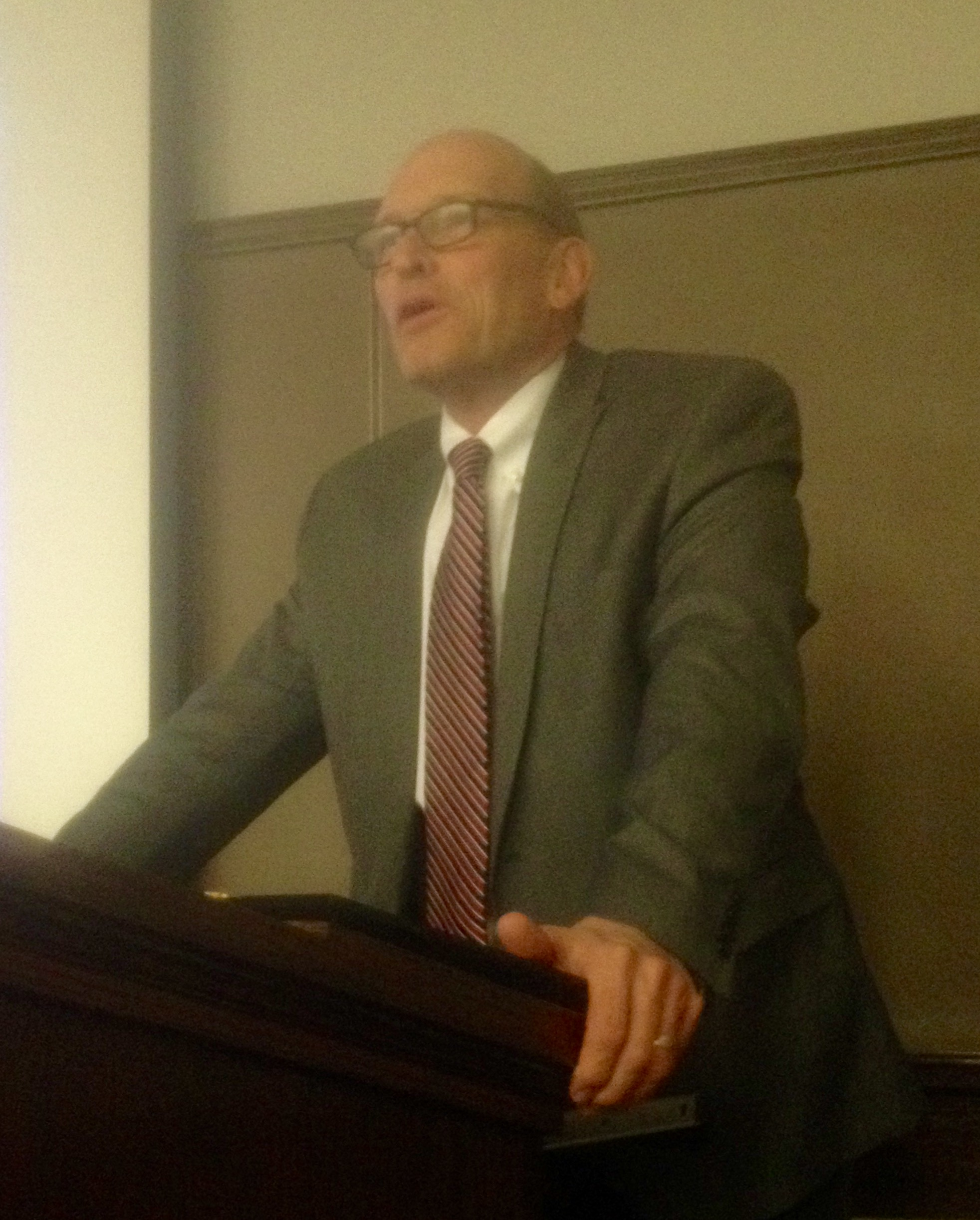
Alexander L. Baugh in 2017.

Alexander L. Baugh (born 1957) is a professor of Church History and Doctrine at Brigham Young University (BYU). He has largely written on the history of the Latter Day Saint movement in the 1830s Missouri period, but has also written on such topics as the Church of Jesus Christ of Latter-day Saints (LDS Church) in Great Britain during the 20th Century.

Baugh was born and raised in Logan, Utah. From 1976 to 1978, he served as a missionary in the LDS Church's Virginia Roanoke Mission. He later received a bachelor's degree from Utah State University. He then became a seminary instructor for the Church Educational System and went on to earn a master's degree and Ph.D. from BYU.

Baugh is the author of Call to Arms: The 1838 Mormon Defense of Northern Missouri and Banner of the Gospel: Wilford Woodruff. He is also the co-editor or co-author of On This Day in the Church: An Illustrated Almanac of the Latter-day Saints and Regional Studies in Church History: New York and Pennsylvania.

Among other callings in the LDS Church, Baugh has served as a bishop. He and his wife, Susan, are the parents of five children.

Baugh is currently one of the editors of the Joseph Smith Papers Project.

== Selected speeches ==
- "Joseph Smith: Seer, Translator, Revelator, Prophet" – Devotional address given at Brigham Young University on November 1, 2016

== Sources ==
- Mormon Historic Sites bio
- BYU biography
- Biography at Joseph Smith Papers Project website (accessed May 4, 2012)
