= Andrew H. Hedges =

American church historian

Andrew H. Hedges (born 1966) is a co-editor of the Joseph Smith Papers, and from 1995 until 2009 was an associate professor of Church History and Doctrine at Brigham Young University (BYU).

He received his bachelor's degree from Weber State University, a master's degree in Near Eastern Studies from BYU and his Ph.D. in American History from the University of Illinois at Urbana-Champaign.

Hedges has written a paper on the early history of the Ogden Valley after Mormon settlement there. He was also the author of On This Day in Church History: An Illustrated Almanac of the Latter-day Saints. He co-authored The Doctrine and Covenants: Revelations in Context with Alonzo L. Gaskill and J. Spencer Fluhman. He was also a co-editor of Regional Studies in Latter-day Saint Church History: Pennsylvania and New York. He also wrote the chapter "Isaiah in America" in Isaiah in the Book of Mormon (Provo: FARMS, 1998). Most recently Hedges published with Richard N. Holzapfel the journal of Lorenzo Snow for the period he was imprisoned on polygamy charges.
