= Truman G. Madsen =

American philosopher

Truman Grant Madsen
- Born: December 13, 1926; Salt Lake City, Utah, US
- Died: May 28, 2009 (aged 82); Provo, Utah, US
- Education: University of Utah (BA, MA); Harvard University (PhD)
- Occupations: Philosopher, historian, speaker, author, professor
- Spouse: Ann N. Madsen
- Website: http://trumanmadsen.com/

Truman Grant Madsen (December 13, 1926 – May 28, 2009) was an American professor of religion and philosophy at Brigham Young University (BYU) and director of the Brigham Young University Jerusalem Center for Near Eastern Studies. He was a prolific author, a recognized authority on Joseph Smith, and a popular lecturer among Latter-day Saints. At one point, Madsen was an instructor at the LDS Institute of Religion in Berkeley, California.

== Biography ==
Madsen was born in Salt Lake City, Utah. He was the second son of Axel A. Madsen and Emily Wells Grant; his parents were members of the Church of Jesus Christ of Latter-day Saints (LDS Church). His mother was a daughter of Heber J. Grant; she died when Madsen was about two years old. He was raised in the home of his aunt Deseret Grant Doyle and her husband Ashby Douglas Doyle, where his father also resided. This—as well as the home where Madsen had lived previously—were in the Avenues area of Salt Lake City.

Madsen served as a Mormon missionary in the New England Mission with S. Dilworth Young as his mission president. After his marriage and the start of his academic career, he was called in 1961 to serve as president of the New England Mission. He served in this position until he was replaced by Boyd K. Packer in 1965.

Madsen received his Ph.D. from Harvard University. He also studied at the University of Utah receiving his bachelor's degree in speech and master's degree in philosophy. He also studied at the University of Southern California before being accepted into the Ph.D. philosophy program at Harvard.

Madsen wrote several philosophical theses, including Four Essays on Love. He also wrote a paper "Are Christians Mormon?", as well as a biography of B. H. Roberts.

While at BYU, Madsen held the Richard L. Evans Chair of Religious Understanding for over 20 years. He also served as the director of the BYU Jerusalem Center from 1991 to 1993.

Madsen most recently served in the LDS Church as the patriarch of the Provo, Utah, Sharon East Stake.

Madsen died at his home on the morning of May 28, 2009, from bone cancer.

Madsen also served as a stake president of a BYU student stake, with James Fillmore and Dennis Harper as counselors. Towards the end of his service, the stake included 14 wards.

During Madsen's tenure as stake president, the stake met in the Harris Fine Arts Center on the BYU Campus. He encouraged worship services to include inspirational music. Since the stake met in the building with concert halls several stake conferences were held there which included a full orchestra. He asked for and received permission to include brass instruments.

During this time as stake president, Madsen also delivered and recorded a lecture series on the presidents of the LDS Church, from Joseph Smith to Gordon B. Hinckley.
