= Davis Bitton =

American historian (1930–2007)

Assistant Church Historian
- 1972 – 1982
- Called by: Leonard J. Arrington
- Predecessor: E. Earl Olson
- Successor: None until 2008; Richard E. Turley, Jr.
- End reason: The LDS Church transferred its History Division to BYU in 1982

Personal details
- Born: Ronald Davis Bitton; February 22, 1930; Blackfoot, Idaho, U.S.
- Died: April 13, 2007 (aged 77); Salt Lake City, Utah, U.S.
- Resting place: Salt Lake City Cemetery; 40°46′37.92″N 111°51′28.8″W
- Education: Ph.D. in history
- Alma mater: Brigham Young University; Princeton University
- Occupation: Historian; Professor of History
- Employer: University of Utah
- Notable works: Author of notable Mormon histories
- Title: Charter member and president of the Mormon History Association

Ronald Davis Bitton (February 22, 1930 – April 13, 2007) was a charter member and president of the Mormon History Association, professor of history at the University of Utah, and official Assistant Church Historian in the Church of Jesus Christ of Latter-day Saints (LDS Church) working with Leonard J. Arrington.

== Biography ==
Bitton was raised in the area of Blackfoot, Idaho. He started playing piano at age six and was a talented pianist. After two years at Brigham Young University (BYU), he served as an LDS missionary in France where he edited the church's L'Etoile periodical. While on his LDS mission he performed on the piano to assist in proselyting. He then served in the United States Army during the Korean War. Bitton returned to BYU where he was president of his Phi Alpha Theta chapter. While president of the Phi Alpha Theta chapter at BYU he invited Arrington to address the spring banquet. Arrington also wrote a letter of recommendation for Bitton during this time. He graduated in 1956 from BYU with a BA in history. Afterward, he studied at Princeton University; there he received a M.A. in 1958 and earned his Ph.D. in French History in 1961.

Bitton was a professor of history at the University of Texas at Austin until 1961 when he started teaching at the University of California, Santa Barbara. He then joined the University of Utah faculty in 1966 where he taught for 29 years until his retirement in 1995. Coming out of retirement, from 2005 to 2006 Bitton was a visiting professor at Brigham Young University Hawaii.

He was an original member and founder of the Mormon History Association in 1965 and he served as president from 1971 to 1972. Bitton served as an official Assistant Church Historian to Leonard J. Arrington from 1972 to 1982. Bitton referred to this time as "Camelot", an exciting time of unprecedented development of new Mormon historical research. Bitton published several works with Arrington. With Arrington's help, Bitton was appointed as a consultant for BYU to the newly created Joseph Fielding Smith Institute with an honorarium of $1,000 per year. However, this position only lasted two years before it was terminated.

Bitton married his wife Joan in 1984, and later in life they served together as guides on Temple Square for five years. He died at the age of 77 in Salt Lake City.

== Awards and honors ==
Davis Bitton has been presented five awards by the MHA. His first award granted by the MHA was in 1975 for the Best Article By A Senior Author for his works Ritualization of Mormon History and The Making of a Community: Blackfoot, Idaho, 1878 to 1910. Two years later he won the Outstanding Bibliography Award for his Guide to Mormon Diaries and Autobiographies. In 1979, Arrington and Bitton were given the MHA Best Book Award for The Mormon Experience: A History of the Latterday Saints. For his biography on George Q. Cannon, Bitton was honored with the MHA Best Book Award in 1999; in 2006, the Mormon History Association awarded Bitton the Leonard J. Arrington Award for "distinguished and meritorious service to Mormon history."

Although his specialty was French history, Bitton made many contributions to Mormon history. Bitton was given the "Silver Award" from Dialogue: A Journal of Mormon Thought for an essay on B. H. Roberts. Bitton's biography of George Q. Cannon was described by Deseret News "as a definitive study of one of the most important of all Mormon leaders."

== Published works ==
The following is only a partial list of Bitton's published works:

=== Books ===
- Bitton, Davis (1969). The French Nobility in Crisis, 1560-1640. Stanford, California: Stanford University Press.
- Bitton, Davis (1974). Wit and Whimsy in Mormon History. Deseret Book.
- Arrington, Leonard; Bitton, Davis (1977). Guide to Mormon Diaries and Autobiographies. Provo, Utah: Brigham Young University Press. ISBN 0-8425-1478-3. Archived from the original (PDF) on 2018-09-07.
  Winner of Outstanding Bibliography Award (Mormon History Association)
- Arrington, Leonard; Bitton, Davis (1979). The Mormon Experience: A History of the Latter-day Saints. New York: Alfred A. Knopf. ISBN 0-394-46566-0.
  Winner of Best Book Award (Mormon History Association)
- Arrington, Leonard; Bitton, Davis (1981). Saints Without Halos: The Human Side of Mormon History. Salt Lake City: Signature Books. ISBN 0-941214-01-X. Archived from the original on 2018-09-06.
- Bitton, Davis (1982). The Redoubtable John Pack: Pioneer, Proselyter, Patriarch. Midvale, Utah: The John Pack Family Association-Eden Hill.
- Arrington, Leonard; Bitton, Davis (1988). Mormons and their Historians. Salt Lake City: University of Utah Press. ISBN 0-87480-280-6.
- Bitton, Davis (1994). The Ritualization of Mormon History and Other Essays. Urbana: University of Illinois Press. ISBN 0-252-02079-0.
- Bitton, Davis (1999). George Q. Cannon: A Biography. Salt Lake City: Deseret Book. ISBN 1-57345-490-7.
  Winner of Best Book Award (Mormon History Association) and Evans Biography Award (Utah State University)

=== Articles ===
- Bitton, Davis (Winter 1975). "Ritualization of Mormon History". Utah Historical Quarterly. 43 (1): 67–85. doi:10.2307/45059451. JSTOR 45059451. S2CID 254449523.
  Winner of Best Article by a Senior Author (Mormon History Association)
- Bitton, Davis (Autumn 1983). "Ten Years in Camelot: A Personal Memoir" (PDF). Dialogue: A Journal of Mormon Thought. 16 (3): 9–19. doi:10.2307/45225167. JSTOR 45225167. S2CID 254398971. Archived from the original (PDF) on 2017-04-22.
