= Church History Department =

The Church History Department (CHD) manages the historical and publishing activities of the Church of Jesus Christ of Latter-day Saints (LDS Church). This includes the Church History Library, Church History Museum, Church Historian's Press, and various research and collection projects. Kyle S. McKay, an LDS general authority seventy, is the current Church Historian and Recorder (CHR).

== History ==
The position of CHR is based on revelations Joseph Smith said he received, which are included in the Doctrine and Covenants, calling for keeping records and preparing a church history. Oliver Cowdery, the first in this position, originally recorded meeting minutes, patriarchal blessings, membership information, priesthood ordinations, and a narrative church history. For a time, the callings of Church Historian and Church Recorder were separate, but in 1842 these callings were merged and now the Church Historian also acts as the Church Recorder.

In 1972, the Church Historian's Office was renamed as the Historical Department. In 2000, this department was merged with the Family History Department to become the Family and Church History Department. On March 12, 2008, the Church Historian separated again from the Family History Department to become the CHD.

A new Church History Library (CHL) was constructed in 2009 and it holds a collection that includes 600,000 photos, 270,000 books, pamphlets, magazines and newspapers, 240,000 collections of original, unpublished records, journals, diaries, correspondence and minutes, 23,000 audio-visual items, 4,000 oral histories and millions of digitized pages.

=== Marlin K. Jensen ===
Under the leadership of Marlin K. Jensen, who served as CHR from 2005 to 2012, the CHD embarked on a number of projects including The Joseph Smith Papers, construction of the CHL, the Family and Church History Department dividing into the Family History Department and the CHD, and numerous additional changes.

- Technological modernization: Thousands of the LDS Church's historical documents were mass digitized and made freely available online, including the Joseph Smith Papers. Historian Jan Shipps called this "a change that is so epochal it would be very hard to turn it back." In addition to developing a new church-wide system for digitally collecting and managing records, the CHL's searchable catalog was made available online.
- International history: The CHD decentralized its collecting of international church history. Church Historians were called for individual areas and countries, and oral histories were to be gathered from mission presidents and area presidents when they were released. Before this time, little had been done to gather international church history. Jensen saw this project as "one of the significant accomplishments in this period of time."
- Historical professionalism: Jensen worked to make the CHD authoritative and trusted within the church, as well as by "historians who write from different points of view". Jensen strained to make archive materials more publicly available and to set the tone of "unflinching honesty ... for a whole new generation of LDS academics." He attended academic conferences and was the first LDS general authority at the Mormon History Association annual meeting.

== Church Historian and Recorder ==
The CHR is a priesthood calling in LDS Church, with its role being to keep an accurate and comprehensive record of the church and its activities. The CHR gathers history sources and preserves records, ordinances, minutes, revelations, procedures, and other documents. On April 10, 2019 LeGrand R. Curtis, Jr., who had been serving as an Assistant Executive Director of the CHD, was announced to replace Steven E. Snow as the CHR.

== Church History Museum ==
A museum of church history was planned as early as 1843 in Nauvoo, Illinois. The current Church History Museum in Salt Lake City, Utah was opened in April 1984. A major proponent of the creation of the church museum was Florence S. Jacobsen, a church curator and a former Young Women General President. The Museum underwent a major renovation in 2015 and since its opening 30 year prior had welcomed more than 7.5 million visitors, hosted more than 100 different exhibits, and sponsored nine editions of the International Art Competition.

== Church Historian's Press ==
The Church Historian’s Press was announced in 2008 by the Church History Department. The Joseph Smith Papers was the first publication to bear the imprint. The press publishes works of Latter-day Saint history, documentary editing projects—which offer direct access to primary documents—narrative histories, and topical studies.

== Publications ==
- Saints: The Story of the Church of Jesus Christ in the Latter Days (The Church of Jesus Christ of Latter-day Saints, September 4, 2018)
- At the Pulpit: 185 Years of Discourses by Latter-Day Saint Women edited by Kate Holbrook and Jennifer Reeder (Church Historian's Press, March 1, 2017, ISBN 978-1629722825)
- The First Fifty Years of Relief Society: Key Documents in Latter-day Saint Women's History edited by Jill Mulvay Derr, Carol Cornwall Madsen, Kate Holbrook, and Matthew J. Grow (Church Historian's Press, February 19, 2016, ISBN 978-1629721507)
- The Joseph Smith Papers edited by Dean C. Jessee, Mark Ashurst-McGee, and Richard L. Jensen (Church Historian's Press, September 1, 2008, ISBN 978-1570088490)
