= Joseph Fielding Smith Institute for Church History =

The Joseph Fielding Smith Institute for Church History (later renamed to Joseph Fielding Smith Institute for Latter-day Saint History) was an academic research organization at Brigham Young University (BYU) from 1980 to 2005 that sought to promote the study of the history of the Church of Jesus Christ of Latter-day Saints.

== History ==
In 1982, the History Division of the church's Historical Department was dissolved and its staff transferred to BYU, to become part of the Smith Institute. Leonard J. Arrington, who headed the History Division from 1972–1982, also led the Smith Institute from 1980–1986. Arrington was succeeded as head of the institute by Ron Esplin. Esplin was succeeded by Jill Mulvay Derr.

The Smith Institute operated as part of BYU's College of Family, Home and Social Sciences.

In 2005, with the growth of the Joseph Smith Papers Project, and with its relocation to the Family and Church History Department in Salt Lake City, it was decided to dissolve the institute and have various academic departments at BYU continue research in church history topics. Some of the former faculty members of the institute, such as Grant Underwood were transferred to BYU's history department.

== Controversies ==
In 2003 in response to Grant Palmer's book in which he gave the impression that at least some of the scholars at the Joseph Fielding Smith Institute supported his views on church history, the Smith Institute issued a statement directly rejecting the views advanced by Palmer.
