= BYU Studies =

- Discipline: Mormon studies
- Language: English

Publication details
- Former names: Brigham Young University Studies; BYU Studies Quarterly (abbreviated: BYU Studies)
- History: 1959-present
- Publisher: Brigham Young University (United States)
- Frequency: Quarterly

Standard abbreviations
- ISO 4: BYU Stud.

Indexing
- ISSN: 2167-8472
- LCCN: 2012203098
- OCLC no.: 793652860

Links
- Journal homepage; Online archive

BYU Studies is a peer-reviewed academic journal published by Brigham Young University, which is sponsored by the Church of Jesus Christ of Latter-day Saints (LDS Church). The journal covers multiple topics within Mormon studies, such as history, culture, sociology, and theology, from an LDS perspective. The journal is abstracted and indexed in the ATLA Religion Database.

== History ==
Originally proposed as Wasatch Review, the periodical was established as Brigham Young University Studies and was first printed in January 1959, as an issue of Brigham Young University Bulletin printed by BYU Press. In April 2012 the journal was renamed BYU Studies Quarterly. In January 2023 the journal reverted to its original name, BYU Studies (dropping Quarterly). The tagline for BYU Studies is "Scholarship Aligned with the Gospel of Jesus Christ." The BYU Studies logo was changed in January 2023 to align with the logo of its parent institution, Brigham Young University.

== Editors ==
The following people have been editor-in-chief:

- Clinton F. Larson (1959–1967)
- Charles D. Tate (1968–1983)
- Edward Geary (1984–1991)
- John W. Welch (1991–2018)
- Steven C. Harper (2019–present)

== See also ==
- List of Latter-day Saint periodicals
