= Church Historian's Press =

LDS Church publishing imprint

- Parent company: Church History Department of the Church of Jesus Christ of Latter-day Saints
- Status: Active
- Founded: 2008
- Country of origin: United States
- Headquarters location: Salt Lake City, Utah
- Distribution: Worldwide
- Publication types: Books and online publications
- Nonfiction topics: LDS Church history
- Official website: churchhistorianspress.org

The Church Historian's Press is an imprint dedicated to publishing scholarly works about the origin, history, and growth of the Church of Jesus Christ of Latter-day Saints (LDS Church). Operated under the direction of the Church Historian and Recorder, its establishment was announced in February 2008 by the LDS Church.

The press' first publication was the multi-volume Joseph Smith Papers, a documentary editing project to provide scholars and researchers with access to all of the documents produced by Joseph Smith, founder of the faith.

The press also publishes other LDS Church documentary histories, such as the significant journals of 19th-century Apostle George Q. Cannon (the first volume was already published by Deseret Book in 1999). In April 2016, this project was instead launched as a searchable website for The Journal of George Q. Cannon, with plans to provide nearly all the journals online and save years in what would be required for print publication. Also in 2016, the press began publication of historic papers of the Relief Society.

The CH Press website was launched on February 2, 2016.

== See also ==
- Joseph Smith Papers
- Relief Society Documents Project
