= Legacy of Joseph Smith =

Impact of Latter Day Saint movement founder

The legacy of Joseph Smith includes the immediate aftermath of Smith's killing, among various competing denominations, the status of his family and the church he founded, and a scholarly assessment of his life and religion. Although Smith was killed in 1844, he attracted thousands of devoted followers before his death, and millions in the century that followed. Among Mormons, he is generally regarded as a prophet on par with Moses and Elijah. In a 2015 compilation of the 100 Most Significant Americans of All Time, Smithsonian magazine ranked Smith first in the category of religious figures.

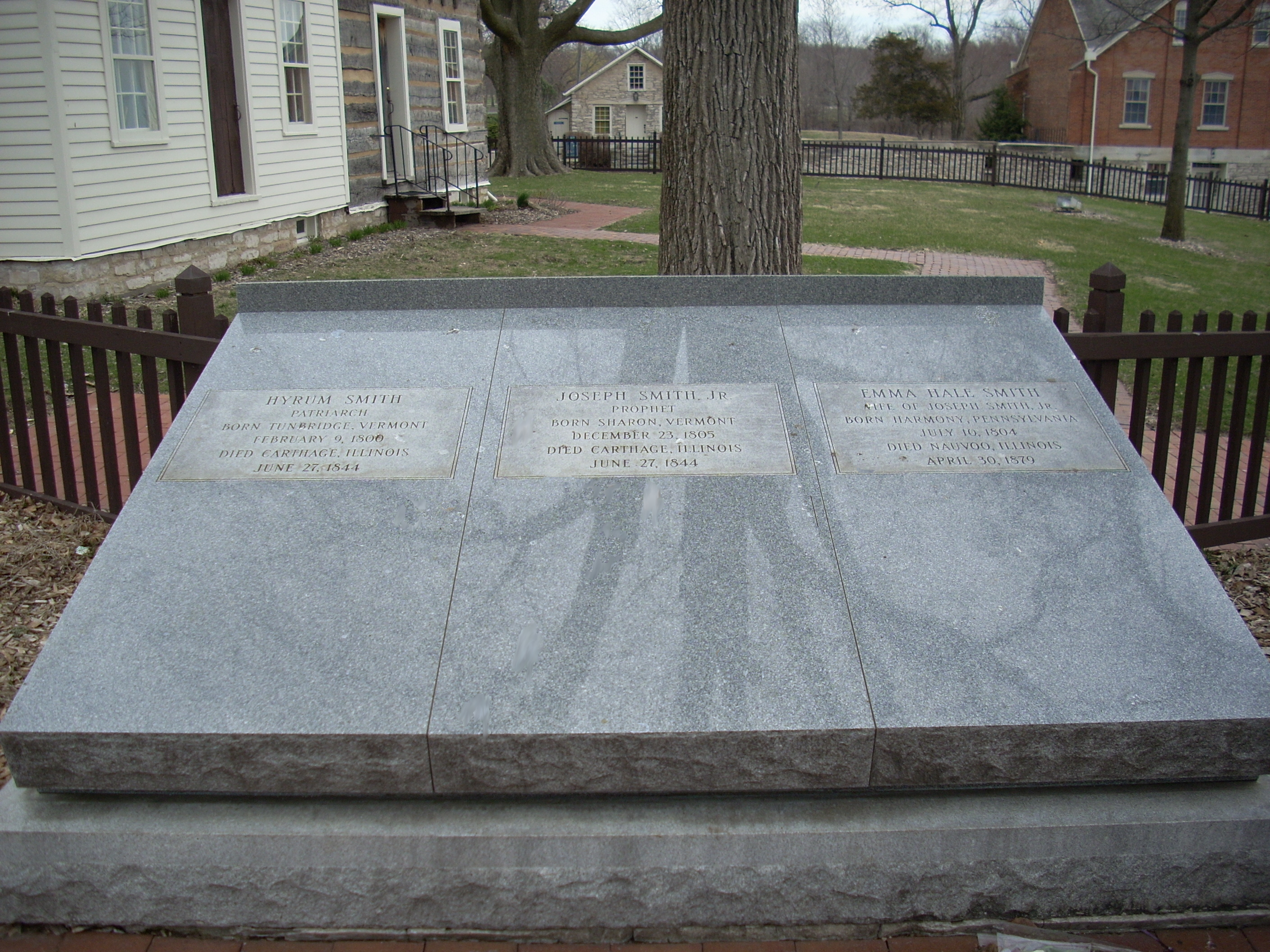
Gravesite of Joseph, Emma, and Hyrum Smith, in Nauvoo, Illinois

== Immediate aftermath ==
After a public funeral and viewing of the deceased brothers, Smith's widow – who feared hostile non-Mormons might try to desecrate the bodies – had their remains buried at night in a secret location, with substitute coffins filled with sandbags interred in the publicly attested grave. The bodies were later moved and reburied under an outbuilding on the Smith property off the Mississippi River. Members of the Reorganized Church of Jesus Christ of Latter Day Saints (RLDS Church), under the direction of then-RLDS Church president Frederick M. Smith (Smith's grandson) searched for, located, and disinterred the Smith brothers' remains in 1928 and reinterred them, along with Smith's wife, in Nauvoo at the Smith Family Cemetery.

Following Smith's death, non-Mormon newspapers were nearly unanimous in portraying Smith as a religious fanatic. Conversely, within the Latter Day Saint community, Smith was viewed as a prophet, martyred to seal the testimony of his faith.

Five men were tried for Smith's murder, but all were acquitted.

== Successors and denominations ==
Smith's death resulted in a succession crisis within the Latter Day Saint movement. He had proposed several ways to choose his successor, but never clarified his preference. Smith's brother Hyrum, had he survived, would have had the strongest claim, followed by Smith's brother Samuel, who died abruptly a month after Joseph and Hyrum. (Note: William Smith, also a brother of Joseph Smith, later claimed Samuel had been poisoned by a follower of Young in order to strengthen Young's claim to succession. Quinn (1994, p. 153) argues that William's claim "should not be ignored" but also notes that it "cannot be verified". Anderson (2001, pp. 7501n22) points out that "William did not make this claim of poisoning until 1892", and she "found no documentation that Lucy [Mack Smith, their mother,] ever considered Samuel's death to be murder". Bushman (2005, p. 555) writes that Samuel died of bilious fever.) Another brother, William, was unable to attract a sufficient following. Smith's sons Joseph III and David were too young: Joseph was aged 11, and David was born after Smith's death. The Council of Fifty had a theoretical claim to succession, but it was a secret organization. (Note: Quinn (1994, pp. 192–98) explains that before his death, Smith had charged the Fifty with the responsibility of establishing the Millennial kingdom in his absence. The Quorum of the Twelve Apostles, whose members were all also members of the Council of Fifty, would eventually claim this "charge" as their own.) Two of Smith's chosen successors, Oliver Cowdery and David Whitmer, had already left the church. Emma Smith and some members of the Anointed Quorum supported appointing Nauvoo stake president William Marks as church president, but Marks ultimately supported Rigdon's claim to succession.

The two strongest succession candidates were Young, senior member and president of the Quorum of the Twelve Apostles, and Rigdon, the senior remaining member of the First Presidency. In a church-wide conference on August 8, most of the Latter Day Saints present elected Young. They eventually left Nauvoo and settled the Salt Lake Valley, Utah Territory. Nominal membership in Young's denomination, which became the LDS Church, surpassed 16 million in 2018. Smaller groups followed Rigdon and James J. Strang, who had based his claim on a letter of appointment ostensibly written by Smith but which some scholars believe was forged. (Note: Rigdon's remnant denominations faded when he became more erratic later in life, but William Bickerton took up the leadership of a large group of Rigdonites which ultimately became its own denomination, today called the Church of Jesus Christ; see Gutjahr (2012, p. 72). Strang's following largely dissipated after his assassination in 1856—an event from which Gutjahr (2012, p. 76) states Strangism "never recover[ed]"—though some persisted into the late-twentieth century; see Quinn (1994, pp. 210–211). Strang's current followers consist of the Church of Jesus Christ of Latter Day Saints (Strangite).) Some hundreds followed Lyman Wight to establish a community in Texas. Others followed Alpheus Cutler. Many members of these smaller groups, including most of Smith's family, eventually coalesced in 1860 under the leadership of Joseph Smith III and formed the RLDS Church, which now has about 250,000 members.

== Assessment ==
Assessments of Smith in the nineteenth century were typically dismissive, such as that of Philip Schaff, whose 1855 appraisal called him an "uneducated but cunning Yankee." Naturalistic biographers in the early twentieth century suggested that Smith suffered from epileptic seizures or from psychological disorders, such as migraines, hallucinations, and "melancholic depression" that might explain his visions and revelations. Fawn Brodie's 1945 biography No Man Knows My History rejected delusive experience as an explanation for Smith's behavior and instead cast him as an intentional charlatan, albeit a talented and accomplished one. After academic Mormon studies developed in the latter half of the twentieth century, two conflicting characterizations of Smith emerged: a fraud preying on the ignorance and credulity of his followers on the one hand (a view associated with detractors of Smith), and a man of God and of great character on the other (the view advanced typically by believers). Historian Jan Shipps called this "the prophet puzzle".

In the twenty-first century, academic assessments became less dismissive of Smith, and scholars became generally more interested in understanding his experiences and his influence in the history of the United States and of religious thought. Biographers – Mormon and non-Mormon alike – agree that Smith was one of the most influential, charismatic, and innovative figures in American religious history. For instance, Wayne Hudson, a humanities scholar, considers Smith "a genuine prophet of world historical importance". Theologian and anthropologist Douglas J. Davies characterizes Smith as a person of striking "moral energy" and courage. According to Laurie Maffly-Kipp, historian Richard Bushman's 2005 Joseph Smith: Rough Stone Rolling – a biography which "steers a deliberate middle ground" between hagiography and exposé – is "the definitive account" of Smith's life. Rough Stone Rolling discusses Smith's financial reversals, mercurial temper and run-ins with the law, while also making a case that Smith's theology and ecclesiology were coherent and appealing.

Historian John G. Turner noted that outside academia, non-Mormons in the U.S. generally consider Smith a "charlatan, scoundrel, and heretic", while outside the U.S., he is "obscure". His legacy within the Latter Day Saint movement varies between denominations. The Church of Jesus Christ of Latter-day Saints (LDS Church) and its members consider Smith the founding prophet of their church. In the words of LDS apostle D. Todd Christofferson, Latter-day Saints "readily acknowledge" Smith's "continuing influence for good in the world, the revelations that he brought forth, his example of service and sacrifice, and his devotion to and witness of the living God". Meanwhile, Smith's reputation is ambivalent in the Community of Christ, formerly the Reorganized Church of Jesus Christ of Latter Day Saints (RLDS Church), which never accepted his Nauvoo-era theological innovations, and late-twentieth-century theological changes further separated the denomination's self-identity from Smith. The Community of Christ continues "honoring his role" in the church's founding history but deemphasizes human leadership, including that of Smith, in favor of "greater focus on Jesus Christ." Conversely, Woolleyite Mormon fundamentalism has deified Smith within a cosmology of many gods.

Buildings named in honor of Smith

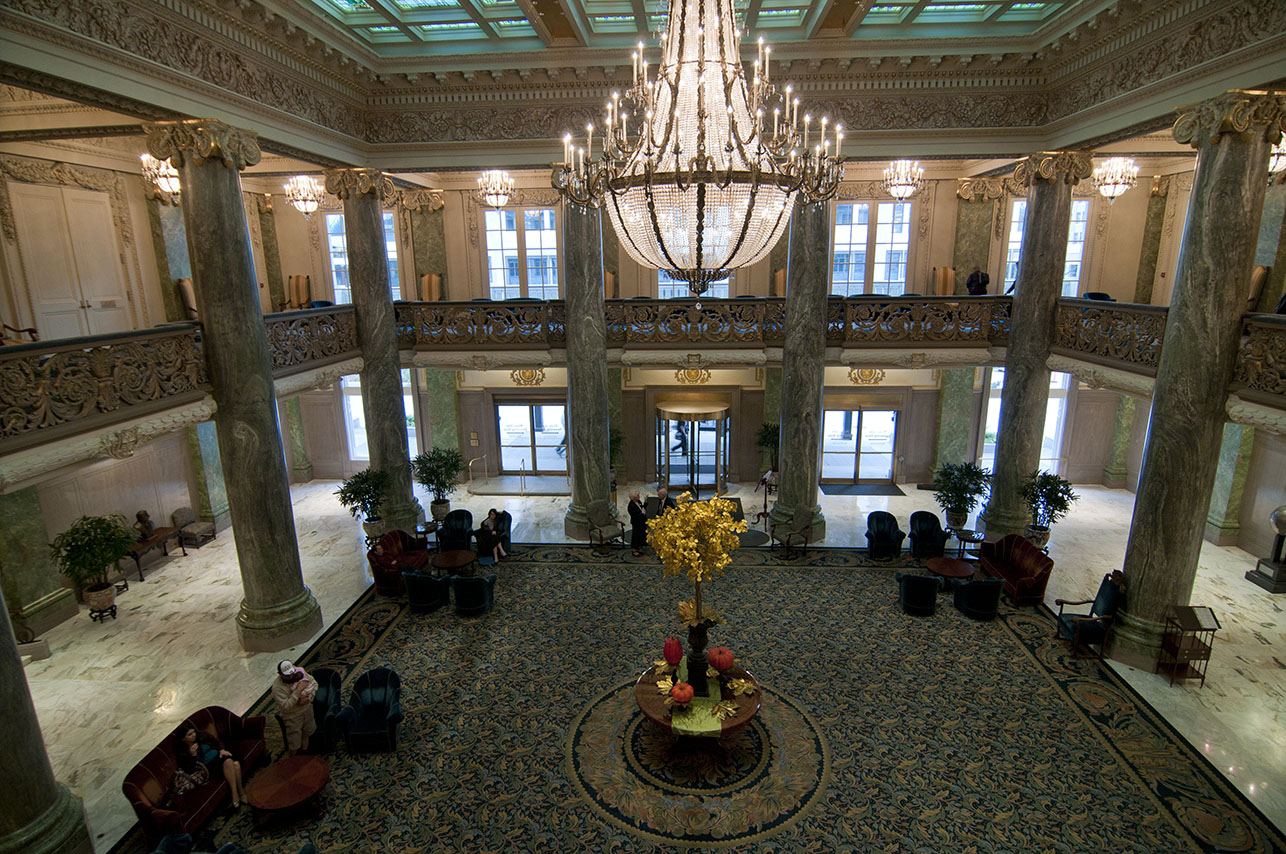
The Joseph Smith Memorial Building in Salt Lake City

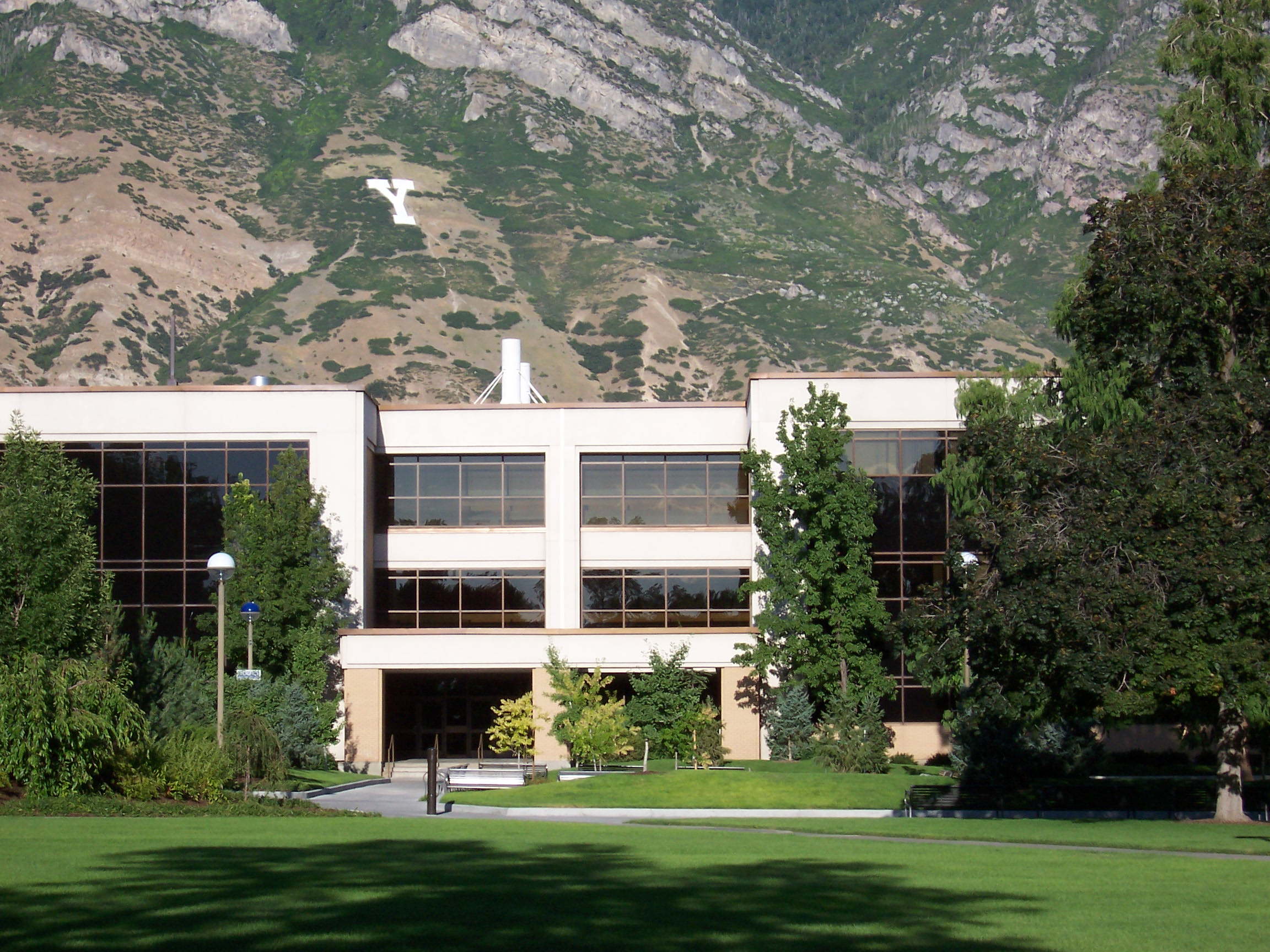
The Joseph Smith Building on the campus of Brigham Young University

Memorials to Smith include the Joseph Smith Memorial Building in Salt Lake City, Utah, the former Joseph Smith Memorial building on the campus of Brigham Young University as well as the current Joseph Smith Building there, a granite obelisk marking Smith's birthplace, and a fifteen-foot-tall bronze statue of Smith in the World Peace Dome in Pune, India.
