= Mormonism and history =

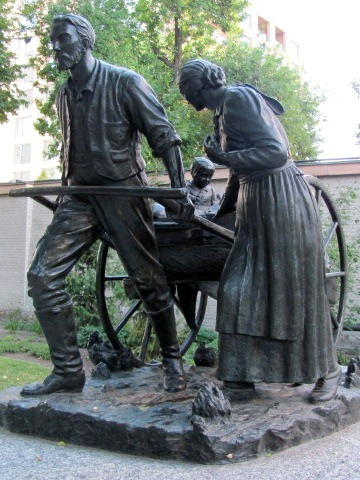
Mormon handcart pioneers are memorialized on Temple Square in Salt Lake City, Utah.

The Mormon religion is predicated on what are said to be historical events such as the First Vision of Joseph Smith and the historicity of the Book of Mormon, which describes a detailed pre-Columbian history of the Americas. Joseph Fielding Smith, the tenth president of the Church of Jesus Christ of Latter-day Saints (LDS Church), declared that "Mormonism, as it is called, must stand or fall on the story of Joseph Smith. He was either a prophet of God, divinely called, properly appointed and commissioned, or he was one of the biggest frauds this world has ever seen. There is no middle ground." As Jan Shipps has written, "Mormonism, unlike other modern religions, is a faith cast in the form of history," and until after World War II, Mormons did not critically examine the historical underpinnings of their faith; any "profane" investigation of the church's history was perceived "as trespassing on forbidden ground."

Although traditional Christianity is likewise a history religion, few primary sources survive from two or three millennia ago, and biblical places such as Jerusalem, Jericho, and Bethlehem, are acknowledged to exist by scholars of every religious persuasion. Likewise, the Assyrian and Babylonian empires mentioned in the Bible are treated in all histories of the ancient Near East. By contrast, locations of Book of Mormon places are disputed even by Mormons, and the existence of those places is not acknowledged by any non-Mormon scholars. Martin Marty, a Lutheran scholar of American religion, has observed that LDS beginnings are so recent "that there is no place to hide. ... There is little protection for Mormon sacredness."

== "Mormons remember" ==
As Richard and Joan Ostling have written, "Mormons remember." There has been an official church historian since the organization of the LDS Church, and "Mormon youths and their sisters are exhorted to keep journals as part of their religious commitment. Missionaries are reminded by their superiors that the journals represent a part of their sacred duties." The pioneer era is an especially fertile field for faith-promoting history. As Wallace Stegner has written, the "tradition of the pioneer that is strong all through the West is a cult in Utah." Mormons "tell and retell their stories of pioneer privations and persecutions." Mormon young people are often given the opportunity to pull a handcart through a patch of desert; Mormon children are early taught the miracle of the gulls, the story of seagulls that supposedly saved the crops of the earliest Utah pioneers from an invasion of crickets in 1848.

Under church president Joseph F. Smith, the LDS Church began to purchase, refurbish, and reconstruct its sacred sites, beginning with Carthage Jail in 1903. "Visitors' centers, restored houses, historic parks, monuments, and trail markers sprouted everywhere." In 1999, the church maintained forty-four such sites, many of which were staffed by its missionaries.

Mormons have also developed "something of an annual outdoor pageant circuit" which serves as both a proselytizing tool and a "faith-affirming" experience to the volunteer participants and most of the audience. An elaborate Hill Cumorah pageant, on the site where Smith said the golden plates were given to him, has been annually performed since 1937. Other LDS pageants are regularly performed in eight locations in the United States, including Nauvoo, Illinois; Independence, Missouri; Manti, Utah; and Oakland, California.

Likewise, the LDS Church has regularly produced faith-promoting films with excellent production values for showing in Salt Lake City and at the visitors' centers of Mormon historic sites. Historical films include Legacy: A Mormon Journey (1990), The Testaments of One Fold and One Shepherd (2000), and Joseph Smith: Prophet of the Restoration (2005). As the Ostlings have written, Legacy is "an example of ritualized history, effectively idealized and simplified." In discussing the Mormon pioneer heritage, "there is no hint of polygamy or millennial land claims or any other distinctive Mormon doctrine, just the idea that a prophet Joseph Smith came up with a new sacred book asking people to lead holy lives." Smith dies as a martyr without mention of Mormon destruction of a Nauvoo newspaper, which triggered the crisis. Nevertheless, "the drama and scenery of the trek are so beautifully photographed" that many Mormons saw the movie repeatedly when visiting Temple Square.

== History and theology ==
Mormon high school students are encouraged to take seminary, a four-year course of religious study. These one-year courses have annual focus on the following: the Old Testament; New Testament; Book of Mormon; and church history and the Doctrine and Covenants. The objective is to enable each student to be familiar with the scriptures and to assist them in applying gospel principles in their daily life. College age students between the ages of 18 and 30 are also encouraged to take religious classes known as "institute". At private church-sponsored universities and colleges, religion courses are required for graduation. Comparatively little of Mormon doctrinal teaching involves "what traditional Christian catechism would call 'pure theology.'" Mormon "history evolves as part of the church's canon," and an LDS Correlation Committee attempts to ensure that "all church publications, from periodicals to curriculum materials, follow official policy and express official interpretations. This means that sensitive historical issues frequently are downplayed, avoided, or denied."

Even the scriptures have been rewritten to fit current doctrine, in line with the idea of continuity and progressive revelation. But once a new version is published, historians are not supposed to notice the change, nor can they write about variations in previous editions. The church regards such reminders as unacceptably embarrassing. The result has been something of an underground traffic in early church documents and editions."

Historian D. Michael Quinn, later excommunicated from the LDS Church, noted that traditional "Mormon apologists discuss such 'sensitive evidence' only when this evidence is so well known that ignoring it is almost impossible." In an oft-quoted speech to church educators in 1981, apostle Boyd K. Packer warned them from the temptation "to tell everything, whether it is worthy or faith-promoting or not. ... In an effort to be objective, impartial, and scholarly, a writer or a teacher may unwittingly be giving equal time to the adversary. ... Do not spread disease germs!" In addition, speaking on "scholars" and "intellectuals," Packer also stated "The dangers I speak of come from the gay-lesbian movement, the feminist movement (both of which are relatively new), and the ever-present challenge from the so-called scholars or intellectuals." Packer went so far as to question the spirituality of some Mormon historians: "One who chooses to follow the tenets of his profession, regardless of how they may injure the church or destroy the faith of those not ready for 'advanced history' is himself in spiritual jeopardy." In the same speech, Packer described how the things historians tell one another are not uplifting and "go far beyond the audience they may have intended, and destroy faith."

Packer has not been the only LDS Church leader critical of historians. Ezra Taft Benson, the church's 13th president, was also outspoken concerning LDS historians. According to Benson

This humanistic emphasis on history is not confined only to secular history; there have been and continue to be attempts made to bring this philosophy into our own Church history. Again the emphasis is to underplay revelation and God's intervention in significant events, and to inordinately humanize the prophets of God so that their human frailties become more evident than their spiritual qualities.

Benson also warned historians against adding context and background information concerning revelations and LDS history. Referring to Benson, church member and historian D. Michael Quinn explained,

Elder Benson gives as examples the discussion by historians of the American temperance movement in the 1830s as part of the circumstances out of which Joseph Smith obtained the revelation on the Word of Wisdom, and he referred to historians who explained the revelation on the three degrees of glory in terms of contemporary questions by American philosophers about the afterlife

The result of this attitude of Mormonism toward history is that truth, "supposedly embedded in history," becomes "dynamic and fluid." Therefore, as Marxist historian Mark Leone has written, "the church has discouraged any intellectual tradition that would interfere with disguising historical factors or with maintaining much of the social reality through the uncritical way lay history is done."

== "Faithful history" ==
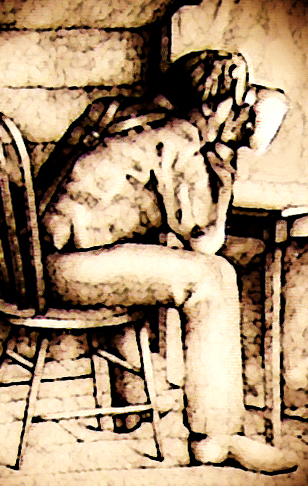
A non-LDS representation of Joseph Smith translating the golden plates by looking at seer stones at the bottom of a hat. Most eyewitnesses described Smith as translating the plates by burying his face in a hat to block out the light; but little church-produced art portrays the process in this way.

During the early years of the church, Mormons concentrated on telling providential history as they had been commanded to do by Joseph Smith. Church clerks compiled a history of the Latter-day Saint movement, weaving the accounts of various people together "into a seamless narrative as though Smith himself were speaking." Then between 1902 and 1912, Mormon apologist B. H. Roberts prepared the work for publication, including as part of the title the phrase "History of Joseph Smith the Prophet, by Himself." "Even worse than causing confusion over Smith's lack of authorship, Roberts made corrections, deletions, and emendations to the six-volume work without explaining his reasons for doing so."

In the twentieth century, the term "faithful history" became a synonym for official Mormon historical writing that was apologetic and celebratory and that downplayed or avoided "sensitive aspects of Mormon history." "If the scholar was Mormon and the church did not like the message, it attacked the messenger."

== New Mormon History ==
Between the works of "faithful historians" and historical works created by disillusioned Mormons, such as Fawn Brodie's No Man Knows My History (1945), grew the New Mormon History, which emphasized "examining the Mormon past in the hope of understanding it" rather than attacking or defending the religion itself. The most noted of the early New Mormon Historians was Leonard J. Arrington, who earned his doctorate in economics but whose early work culminated in the publication of Great Basin Kingdom, An Economic History of the Latter-day Saints (Harvard University Press, 1958), which became "a watershed in the writing of the New Mormon History." Arrington played an important role in organizing the Mormon Historical Association in 1965 and became its first president.

In 1972, Arrington was called to serve as the LDS Church Historian, although he was not a General Authority. Some of Arrington's efforts to publish New Mormon history scholarship through the Church Historian's office met positive reception, such as apostle Howard W. Hunter and church president Spencer W. Kimball's approval of the book The Story of the Latter-day Saints. Hunter was Arrington's predecessor as Church Historian, and he in particular believed the church was "mature enough that our history should be honest" and was excited about the Church Historical Department's new professional direction. In 1978, Kimball went so far as to tell Arrington, "the Lord is pleased that you are the historian of his church."

However, other members of the Quorum of the Twelve Apostles—specifically Ezra Taft Benson (quorum president at the time), Mark E. Peterson, and Boyd K. Packer—became highly critical of Arrington's work and, according to D. Michael Quinn, "shared a suspicion of what was going on in the historical department and misgivings concerning Leonard's appointment." Some of Arrington's subordinates were not allowed to publish through church organs or imprints, and they were eventually removed. Church president Kimball disapproved of the criticism, considering it unchristian, but he still refrained from directly censuring critical apostles, resulting in critics generally having the last word on the Church Historical Department. Privately, Arrington wrote, "Our great experiment in church-sponsored history has proved to be, if not a failure, at least not an unqualified success." In 1982, the First Presidency sent Arrington a personal letter releasing him from his call as church historian, and the release "was not publicly announced in General Conference." When the church added a gallery of portraits of all church historians to the East Wing of the Church Office Building, Arrington was not included. A portrait of Arrington was later hung in 1990, but he was grouped with "division heads" rather than with the church historians. According to Quinn, "Leonard [Arrington] became the fall guy ... and the apostles blamed him for everyone who was disturbed or upset or embarrassed about something that they read based upon research that was done since 1972."

Mormon studies became an increasingly hazardous pursuit for Mormon scholars, "especially if they were members of the Brigham Young University faculty." The Church restricted access to papers formerly available to non-Mormons and asked researchers to sign releases "giving the church permission to exercise pre-publication censorship." The sensational Mark Hofmann murder and forgery case of 1985, could only have developed from the "curious mixture of paranoia and obsessiveness" with which both the LDS Church and individual Mormons approached the history of their faith.

== Tension between faith and scholarship ==
=== D. Michael Quinn ===
Some LDS Church historians have lost their membership after publishing their work. The most well-known is former Brigham Young University (BYU) professor D. Michael Quinn, who was eventually excommunicated for insubordination. To become a BYU professor, Quinn had to meet with LDS Church apostle Boyd K. Packer, and according to Quinn, Packer told him at that meeting that he had "a hard time with historians, because historians idolize the truth."

Later Quinn's local bishop told him that on the authority of LDS Church apostles, he had been asked to withdraw Quinn's temple recommend until Quinn agreed to stop publishing material damaging to the LDS Church, which it viewed as "speaking ill of the Lord's anointed". According to Quinn, the bishop told him to "find some way to do history without these conflicts with the brethren." Quinn said he replied that he would do his best but that he did not know how he "could do both at the same time." Because BYU professors were required to have a temple recommend, the bishop put the recommend in his desk drawer and told Quinn if anyone asked him if he had a temple recommend, he could say yes.

Quinn taught at BYU for a few more years but eventually decided to resign rather than be forced out. Quinn never again held an academic position and was eventually excommunicated from the church for insubordination because he refused to meet with LDS local leaders concerning "an accusation of apostasy based upon my publications."

=== Richard Bushman ===
Richard Bushman, an academic historian who is also a believing Mormon, has written about the tension he feels in writing accurately while also supporting his faith. In his book, Rough Stone Rolling, Bushman does not conceal the more controversial aspects of Joseph Smith's character, but he does try to ameliorate their impact on believing readers while still maintaining historical objectivity. In his essay "The Balancing Act: A Mormon historian reflects on his biography of Joseph Smith," Bushman noted that one reviewer had written of his "walking a high wire between the demands of church conformity and the necessary openness of scholarly investigation." In response, Bushman argued that one did not have to be objective to write history.

Passion and belief are certainly not requirements for historical inquiry, but neither are they crippling handicaps. Once we relinquish, as we must, the "noble dream" of objective history, personal commitment becomes a valuable resource ... Contrary to the idea that belief closes the mind, our passions open our eyes and ears. Stifling my belief in Joseph Smith would extinguish one of my greatest assets.

Bushman said he wanted to avoid writing a hagiography because he wanted to engage "all kinds of readers." Bushman explained,

My historical instincts moved me to tell the whole story as truthfully as I could anyway, but I also knew that if I overly idealized Smith, I would lose credibility with non-Mormons. With a broad readership in mind, I could not conceal his flaws. Moreover, I tried to voice unbelieving readers' likely reactions when Smith married additional wives or taught doctrines foreign to modern sensibilities. When he went beyond the pale, I acknowledged readers' dismay.

In a short but revealing book published after his book tour for Rough Stone Rolling, Bushman concluded that he had "the educated Mormons" with him but that although he had the respect of most non-Mormon scholars, he did not have "their acquiescence. I have not given them a Joseph they can believe in."

=== Grant Palmer ===
Initially Grant Palmer was hired to teach history at the Church College of New Zealand. Shortly later he began teaching religion, which led to a 34-year career in the Church Educational System (CES). He was director of the LDS Institute of Religion in Whittier, California (1970–73) followed by Chico, California (1975–80). Returning to Utah, he then taught LDS seminary at East High School in 1980 and at Brighton High School from 1980 to 1988.

During this time the infamous Salamander letter surfaced, which challenged the orthodox story of Mormon beginnings, though the letter was eventually found to be a forgery. As an ardent student of LDS history, the letter caused Palmer to consider the influences of American folk magic on Joseph Smith's religious practices. In 1985, Palmer's research on this issue led him to write and circulate a manuscript called "New York Mormonism" under the pseudonym "Paul Pry, Jr." which became the first draft of An Insider's View of Mormon Origins. As he grew uneasy with some aspects of LDS history, Palmer approached his CES supervisor about changing positions to teach adults at the Salt Lake County Jail. Teaching more general Christian and Biblical lessons of faith and ethics to all inmates, he was the jail's chaplain and director of its Institute program from 1988 until his 2001 retirement. He also served on the board of directors of the Salt Lake Legal Defenders Association.

After completing his long-coming manuscript, he published the controversial book An Insider's View of Mormon Origins with Signature Books in 2002, in which Palmer challenged the orthodox teachings of Mormonism's beginnings. Palmer's prison teaching led him to write another book, The Incomparable Jesus, published by Greg Kofford Books in 2005.

In 2003 An Insider's View was criticized by BYU's Foundation for Ancient Research and Mormon Studies (FARMS) in reviews written by Daniel C. Peterson, Davis Bitton, Steven C. Harper, Mark Ashurst-McGee, and Louis Midgley. These were published in the FARMS Review alongside an official statement from BYU's Joseph Fielding Smith Institute for Latter-day Saint History disagreeing with Palmer's conclusions. In the following Review issue, historian James B. Allen published another critical review.

Palmer asserts that he was disfellowshipped from the LDS Church in December 2004 as a result of An Insider's View of Mormon Origins. (Being disfellowshipped results in probational loss of some church privileges without being forced to leave the church).

Palmer concluded that while he liked many of the teachings of Joseph Smith, "the foundational events in church history are too problematic to ignore". He found that much of what Latter-day Saints take for granted as literal history has, over the years, been modified to emphasize certain aspects over others. This, he believes, has resulted in an inaccurate picture of LDS Church history.

Palmer argues also that the Mormon Jesus is very different from the current Christian Jesus due to the modern practices of the LDS Church such as forced tithing, avoidance of wine drinking, and use of special clothing.

In 2008, Palmer wrote an article in The Salt Lake Tribune comparing the Mormon and Catholic Churches to the Pharisees, whose observance of strict laws and oral traditions was decried by Jesus. Palmer believed that, instead, a true belief in Christian religion is centered in individually becoming good and loving people.

Palmer stated in a Mormon Stories interview in 2012 that due to the publication of a two and half page article in 2010, "Religious feeling and truth", for an obscure Baptist journal in Kansas City, a second disciplinary council was scheduled but Palmer handed in his resignation before the hearing was held. Several reasons led to his decision; mainly, that the first disciplinary council lasted an exhausting seven hours and he did not want to repeat that experience and also that the presiding authority of the second council let him know beforehand that to stay a member and avoid excommunication he would need to repudiate all of the details from his book and also regain his testimony of the church.

== See also ==
- Historicity of the Book of Mormon
- Historiography
- Mormon pioneers
- Origin of the Book of Mormon
