= John C. Hamer =

American-Canadian historian and mapmaker (born 1970)

Pastor John Hamer
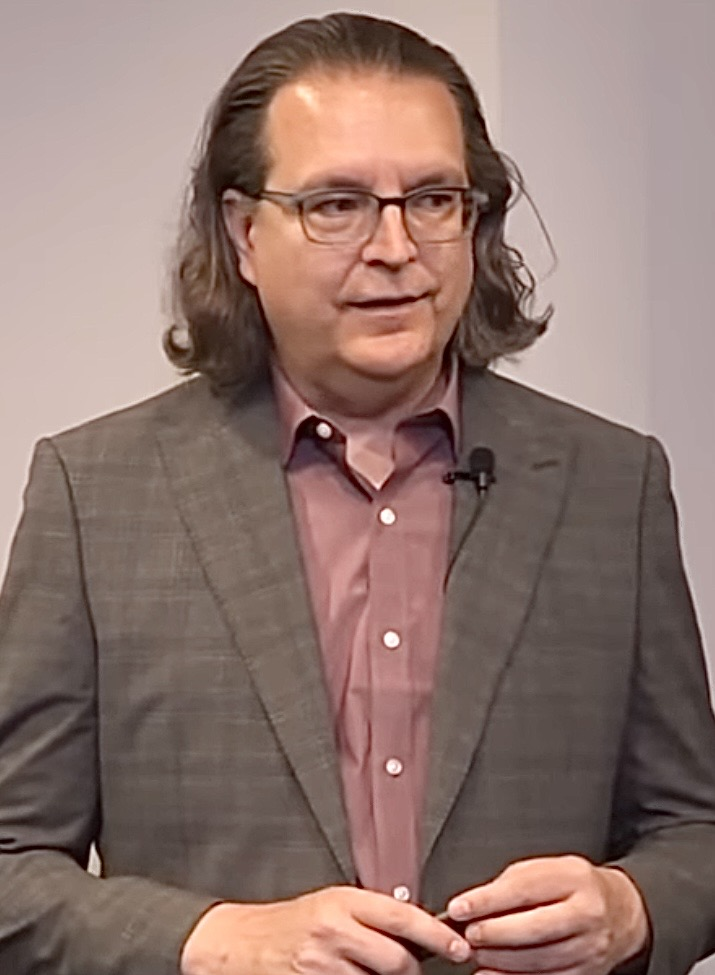
- Hamer in May 2025
- Born: 1970 (age 55–56); Chicago metropolitan area
- Citizenship: Canadian
- Education: Brigham Young University (B.A.); University of Michigan (M.A., 1995)
- Occupations: cartographer, historian, minister
- Spouse: Mike Karpowicz

Ecclesiastical career
- Ordained: Community of Christ

Religious life
- Religion: Christianity
- Denomination: Community of Christ (Restorationist,Progressive Latter Day Saint)
- Church: Toronto Congregation at Centre Place (founded in 1891)
- Profession: Pastor
- Website: saintswithoutborders.weebly.com www.centreplace.ca

John C. Hamer (born 1970) is an American-Canadian historian, mapmaker, and minister. His research has focused primarily on the history of the Latter Day Saint movement, authoring several books on the topic. Hamer is a leading expert on various schisms within especially non-far-Western (U.S.) portions of the Latter Day Saint "Restoration" movement. Raised in the Church of Jesus Christ of Latter-day Saints (LDS Church), Hamer left the religion before joining Community of Christ in 2010. He serves as Pastor of its Toronto Congregation.

Hamer was a contributor to By Common Consent, the Restoration Studies Coordinator at Sunstone Education Foundation, and the executive director of the John Whitmer Historical Association.

== Early life and education ==
Hamer was born in the suburbs of Chicago, and grew up in a suburb of Minneapolis. He was raised LDS and was active as a Deacons Quorum President, Seminary Class President, Eagle Scout. Hamer became a "closet doubter" as a teenager, and left organized religion altogether as an adult. Uninterested in Mormonism, at age 26 he read No Man Knows My History, and commented that Fawn Brodie's historicity and factuality rehabilitated Joseph Smith for him. Hamer received a Bachelor of Arts from Brigham Young University, and a Master of Arts from the University of Michigan.

== Career ==
The view that the Reorganization was the only true continuation of the original church was also a theological claim, held by early members of the Reorganization. Community of Christ abandoned this claim decades ago when it came to understand that the very act of making the claim to be 'the one and only true church,' is a sign that you aren't it (i.e., because there isn't just one).

Theologically early Mormons believed that they were the Restoration of the New Testament church in every sense, including recovering all the actual historical practices and institutional authority. This was a faith position that was zealously believed, but which cannot be shown to be possible in an actual historical sense. This is no shame on them; people regularly have these notions — the people of the Renaissance actually believed they had given birth anew to the Classical era. Of course they hadn't. They created something new, because you can never go home again. Likewise the 1830 organization was something new. And the 1860 reorganization, although possessed of vast continuity of membership, belief, and practice with the 1830 organization, was (in fact) a new foundation in an institutional historical sense.

— John Hamer, Wheat & Tares, December 4, 2010

John Hamer was executive director of the John Whitmer Historical Association 2005–2009 and the Association's president 2010–2011. In 2007, Hamer was founding editor of the Association's imprint, John Whitmer Books. He also has produced maps for university presses and museums, including the University of Michigan Press, Columbia University Press, the Smithsonian Institution Press, the Strategic Air and Space Museum, and the Lewis and Clark National Historic Trail Interpretive Center. In Mormon studies, he has made maps for the LDS Church's Joseph Smith Papers Project, Herald Publishing House, Greg Kofford Books, the Journal of Mormon History, Mormon Historic Studies, the JWHA Journal, and Restoration Studies, among others.

On 6 April 2010, Hamer joined Community of Christ. He presently serves as pastor of its congregation in downtown Toronto, Ontario, Canada, and as a Historian for its Canada East Mission. He is President of the Sionito Group of Charities. Hamer is a founding editor at the group blog Saints Herald. Hamer helped found the Community of Christ ministry Latter-day Seekers as well as the on-line, inclusive pastoral gathering, Beyond the Walls. Hamer gives regular lectures at Centre Place (the Toronto congregation of Community of Christ) on the topics of history, theology, and philosophy. Over 100 of his lectures are available on the Centre Place YouTube channel. Semiweekly on weekdays, Hamer teaches sitting meditation from the Zen tradition.

== Personal life ==
Hamer's mother's ancestry goes back seven generations to the early Latter Day Saint church in 1833. His family history is connected to many variations of Latter Day Saint Restorationism (including Brighamites, Josephites, Rigdonites, Whitmerites, and Strangites). Hamer is married to Mike Karpowicz, whom he lives with in Toronto, Ontario.

== Works ==
=== Books ===
- Donia, Robert J.; Fine, John V. A. Jr. (1994). Bosnia and Hercegovina: A Tradition Betrayed. New York: Columbia University Press. ISBN 0-231-10160-0. "With maps by John C. Hamer"
- Bringhurst, Newell G.; Hamer, John C., eds. (10 September 2007). Scattering Of The Saints: Schism Within Mormonism. Independence, Missouri: John Whitmer Books. ISBN 978-1-934-90102-1.
- Walden, Barbara; Lachlan, MacKay (2008). House of the Lord: The Story of Kirtland Temple. United States: John Whitmer Books. ISBN 978-1-934-90106-9. "With photographs by Val Brinkerhoff, and illustrations by John Hamer"
- Hamer, John C. (12 September 2008). 1844-1859: A Time Of Transition. CreateSpace Independent Publishing Platform. ISBN 978-1-440-42207-2. "Souvenir book of the 36th Annual Meeting of the John Whitmer Historical Association, held in Old Voree (Burlington), Wisconsin, in 2008. Includes maps, photos, association information, and the complete program of the conference."
- Hamer, Ginger, ed. (8 May 2009). Fitly Framed Together: The Life and Testimony of Bob and Louise Erekson. BookSurge Publishing. ISBN 978-1-4392-2912-5. "Cover design by John C. Hamer"
- Howlett, David J.; Walden, Barbara B.; Hamer, John C. (January 2010). Community of Christ: An Illustrated History. Independence, Mo.: Herald Publishing House. ISBN 978-0-830-91490-6.
- Hamer, John C. (12 September 2011). Northeast of Eden: Atlas of Mormon Settlement in Caldwell County, Missouri, 1834-39. John Whitmer Books. ISBN 978-1-934-90107-6.

=== Articles ===
- Hamer, John C. (Spring 2008). "Mapping Mormon Settlement in Caldwell County, Missouri" (PDF). Mormon Historical Studies. 9 (1): 15–38.
- Hamer, John (2008). "Review of Early Patriarchal Blessings of The Church of Jesus Christ of Latter-day Saints by H. Michael Marquardt". The John Whitmer Historical Association Journal. 28: 300–311. JSTOR 43200460.
- Hamer, John (2008). "Why I Am a Member of Community of Christ". In William Dean Russell (ed.). Homosexual Saints: The Community of Christ Experience. John Whitmer Books.
- Hamer, John C. (2012). "Mapping Mormonism and the Latter Day Saint Movement". The John Whitmer Historical Association Journal. 32 (2): 1–35. "2011 Presidential Address John Whitmer Historical Association"

==== Podcast appearances ====
Hamer has been a guest on many podcasts including Mormon Stories, Gay Mormon Stories, Mormon Sunday School, Project Zion Podcast, Feminist Mormon Housewives, Mormon Expression, Infants on Thrones, Mormon Expositor, Sunstone, Radio West, Back Story with the American History Guys, Interesting Canadian Mormons, Naked Mormonism, Rational Faiths, and Mormon Matters.
