= Richard P. Howard =

American historian

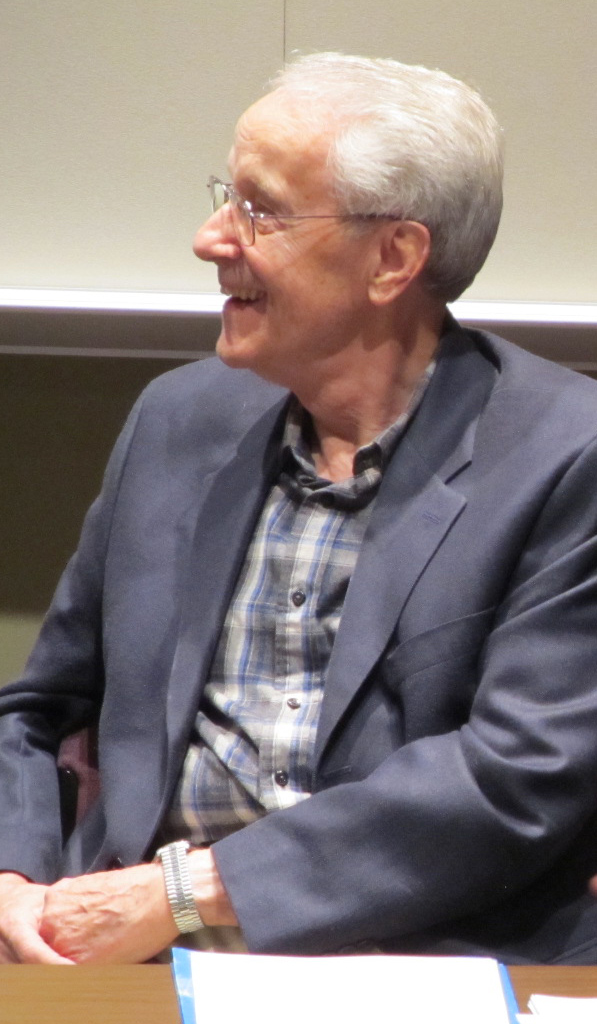
Richard P. Howard attending the annual Restoration Studies Symposium in April 2011.

Richard P. Howard is an American historian emeritus of Community of Christ, having served as world church historian of that organization (previously named the Reorganized Church of Jesus Christ of Latter Day Saints) from 1966 to 1994. He was the first professionally trained scholar to occupy that position. Howard has frequently been compared to Leonard Arrington, his counterpart in the Church of Jesus Christ of Latter-day Saints (LDS Church). Both church historians are recognized as pioneering scholars of the New Mormon History. Howard's contributions include foundational work on Latter Day Saint scripture and the professionalization of the history of the Reorganization and the Community of Christ. His research into the origins of Mormon polygamy helped change his church's official stance on the subject.

== Education ==
Howard earned an associate degree from Graceland College, a B.A. in education from the University of Kansas, and an M.A. in history from the University of California-Berkeley. He pursued further graduate studies at the University of Kansas, American University in Washington, D.C., and Saint Paul School of Theology in Kansas City, Missouri.

== RLDS Church historian, 1966–1994 ==
When Charles A. Davies retired as church historian of the Reorganized Church of Jesus Christ of Latter Day Saints in 1963, Howard succeeded him in that position, becoming the first professionally trained RLDS church historian. This change took place against the backdrop of a broader trend of professionalization in the history of the Latter Day Saint movement commonly known as the "New Mormon History". In the RLDS context, major participants in the New Mormon History included Howard, Robert Flanders, Alma Blair, Barbara Higdon, Paul M. Edwards, William D. Russell, and W. Grant McMurray.

Howard's first major contribution was a study of the scriptures produced by Joseph Smith Jr., entitled Restoration Scriptures: A Study of Their Textual Development (1969). In this work, Howard noted evolutionary changes in the Joseph Smith Translation or "Inspired Version" of the Bible and similar changes in the revelations recorded in the Doctrine and Covenants. More provocative was his comparison of the various texts of the Book of Mormon from the 1829 manuscript through the 1840 printed version. In noting the numerous changes in the text, Howard concluded that the composition process of the Book of Mormon could not have been a word for word "translation" that some of Smith's contemporaries reported. Howard's study received the "Best Book Award" from the Mormon History Association in 1969/1970.

While serving as church historian, Howard contributed articles to the independent, progressive RLDS periodical, Courage: A Journal of History, Thought, and Action. Published quarterly between 1970 and 1973, Courage anticipated many of the progressive changes that would occur within the RLDS Church as it transformed into the Community of Christ. Howard's contributions included a study of the Book of Abraham in which he concluded with candor that "separate analyses of modern Egyptologists have established conclusive evidences that Joseph Smith's Book of Abraham (text and interpretations of the papyri drawings) is not even remotely related to the cultural reality behind the inscriptions and artwork on the Egyptian papyri brought to Kirtland." Howard further suggested that "it may be helpful to suggest that the Book of Abraham represents simply the product of Joseph Smith Jr.'s imagination" because it is "neither a scholarly translation...nor any kind of 'inspired' translation."

Howard was one of the first three RLDS historians to join the Mormon History Association (MHA), and he was among the original fifteen founders of the John Whitmer Historical Association (JWHA) on September 18, 1972. He served as president of JWHA in 1985 and as president of MHA in 1990–91. Also among the founders of JWHA was Howard's assistant in the Church Historian's Office, W. Grant McMurray. McMurray later became a member of the church's First Presidency, rising ultimately to become prophet-president of the church.

By the 1960s and 1970s, the traditional RLDS view that Brigham Young rather than Joseph Smith Jr. was the origin of Mormon polygamy had been called into question by scholars of the New Mormon History. In 1965, Robert B. Flanders, a professor of history at Graceland College published Nauvoo: Kingdom on the Mississippi. Flanders concluded that the traditional RLDS view was incorrect, asserting instead that the practice had indeed originated with Joseph Smith. In 1977, the First Presidency of the RLDS Church directed Howard to investigate the issue. Several years of careful study led Howard to generally agree with Flanders' conclusions. His seminal article on the topic, "The Changing RLDS Response to Mormon Polygamy: A Preliminary Analysis" (1983), opened the door to reassess the church's official policy. However, as Howard recalled decades later, this study was "heavily edited" and "watered down" at the direction of church leaders and Howard considered its final form to be "a painful compromise."

Among Howard's final accomplishments as church historian was the production of The Church through the Years, published in two volumes in 1992 and 1993. Volume 1 was subtitled "RLDS Beginnings to 1860" and Volume 2 was subtitled "The Reorganization Comes of Age, 1860–1992." As Howard explains in his introduction, the work resulted from the desire of RLDS prophet-president W. Wallace Smith to have "a more legitimate history of the church" with the goal of producing "a more honest, less defensive history." In a review published in the John Whitmer Historical Association Journal, Mormon historian Glen Leonard (a member of the LDS Church) agreed that Howard had "written a less defensive (though still denominational) and more legitimate (though still faith-centered) history of the church through its formative years."

== Retirement and Emeritus Historian, 1994–present ==
Howard retired as church historian in 1994, becoming church historian emeritus. He was succeeded by Mark A. Scherer.

Since his retirement, Howard has continued to publish new articles and to actively promote scholarship. More recent articles by Howard include, "The Quest for Traces of a Peace Gene in Restoration History" and "The RLDS Church's Anti-Polygamy Stance Adapted/Canonized 1967–1972: The Specter of an Impending Schism" Since Ronald E. Romig retired as church archivist in 2009, Howard has served as a part-time volunteer in the Community of Christ Archives at the temple in Independence, Missouri.

The John Whitmer Historical Association presented Howard with its "Lifetime Achievement Award" in 2003. On September 24, 2011, at the association's annual presidential banquet, outgoing president John C. Hamer announced that the association would sponsor an annual lecture series named the "Richard P. Howard Lecture" beginning in 2012.
