= Dean L. May =

American historian (1938–2003)

Dean Lowe May (April 6, 1938 – May 6, 2003) was an American academic, author and documentary filmmaker and professor of history at the University of Utah in Salt Lake City, Utah. May specialized in nineteenth- and twentieth-century social and cultural history of the American West through the study of community and family. He taught American studies as a Fulbright guest professor at the University of Bonn, Germany and Ain Shams University in Cairo, Egypt. May was a member of the Utah State Board of History, editor of the Journal of Mormon History (1982–1985), and served as president of the Mormon History Association in 2002. May was honored as a Pioneer of Progress in Historic and Cultural Arts by the Days of 47 Celebration Committee for the State of Utah in 2002.

== Education and career ==
May received a master's degree in history from Harvard University in 1967. Completing his Ph.D. at Brown University in 1974, he focused on the economics and history associated with the Great Depression and the administration of Franklin D. Roosevelt. His thesis was entitled "From New Deal to New Economics: The Response of Henry Morgenthau Jr. and Marriner S. Eccles to the Recession of 1937."

May's training in economics and history led to a position with the Historical Department of the Church of Jesus Christ of Latter-day Saints in 1974, where he worked with Church Historian Leonard J. Arrington. During 1974, May was also a fellow at the Newberry Library and Community History Institute, studying quantitative methods which he used in his studies of Kanab, Utah and other western communities. In collaboration with Arrington he revised and expanded a long manuscript by the late Feramorz Y. Fox into the book Building the City of God: Community and Cooperation Among the Mormons. The work examined the social importance of community and discussed unity, individuality, and human imperfection and failure.

In 1977, May joined the History Department at the University of Utah, and taught at the institution until his death in 2003. For six years, he served as director of the university's Center for Historical Population Studies.

To supplement his university presentations, May wrote and produced an award-winning twenty-segment video series entitled A People's History of Utah (Salt Lake City, University of Utah Instructional Media Services, 1981–88). The series consists of 20 half-hour programs and has been broadcast on public television and used as a supplement to University history courses and in Utah public school classrooms. The series explores the dynamic relationship between the natural and political forces sculpting Utah, and includes an examination of the history and contributions of minority communities and cultures within the state. In a supplementary text by the same title, published in 1987, May discussed his aims as a historian: "History belongs to the people. Though there must be discourse among the scholars--fierce debates and exchanges on arcane topics in professional meetings and journals--the product, to justify our endeavor, must ultimately be accessible to all" (May, A People's History of Utah, p. ix). He produced a second video series Utah Remembers (Salt Lake City, KJZZ-TV channel 14, 1996), which consists of seven 45-minute programs.

During the summer of 2001, May crossed the North Sea and the Atlantic on the Norwegian built Christian Radich, a full-rigged sailing vessel. The voyage reenacted the 19th Century Mormon passages from Europe to the United States. May served as a member of the ship's crew and taught immigration history to his fellow passengers. Seeking to complement the history of the Mormon land migration by wagon and handcart, May focused on the voyage as an element that prepared European converts to forge an LDS community identity.

May presented papers at meetings of Western History, Mormon History, and Social Science History Associations. Nearly four dozen articles were published in Utah Historical Quarterly, Idaho Yesterdays, Journal of Mormon History, Sociology and Social Research, Population Studies, Agricultural History, Church History, and the Journal of Family History. May was a contributor to the FDR Encyclopedia and The Harvard Encyclopedia of American Ethnic Groups. His final book, Three Frontiers: Family, Land, and Society in the American West: 1850-1900 (Cambridge University Press, 1994), employs quantitative methods and personal histories to explore three agricultural communities.

When the University of Utah completed its new Carolyn Tanner Irish Humanities Building, it posthumously named its western and Utah history library after May, as well as two other rooms in the building.

== Biography ==
May was born in Worland, Wyoming to Frank Peter and Wanda Lowe May. When he was nine, the family moved to a forty-acre farm near Middleton, Idaho. May was a devoted Latter-day Saint (Mormon) and as a young man he served a Mission for the Church of Jesus Christ of Latter-day Saints (LDS Church) in Northern California. He married Cheryll Lynn May in 1967 in the Oakland California Temple and the couple had three children, Timothy, Thaddeus and Caroline. He later served in the LDS Church as a Bishop and as a High Councilor for a stake at the University of Utah.

For the last eight years of his life May sang with the Utah Symphony Chorus.

May died on 6 May 2003, following a heart attack.

== Selected publications ==
- "A Ray of Millennial Light: Early Education and Social Reform in the Infant School Movement in Massachusetts, 1826-40," with Maris A. Vinovskis. Included in Maris A. Vinovskis, Education, Society and Economic Opportunity (New Haven: Yale University Press, 1995), pp. 17–44.
- "Sugar House Ward: A Latter-day Saint Congregation," with Jan Shipps and Cheryll L. May. Included in James P. Wind and James W. Lewis, eds., American Congregations, Vol I (Chicago: University of Chicago Press, 1994), pp. 293–348. Winner of the T. Edgar Lyon Award for Excellence from the Mormon History Association, 1995.
- Utah: A People's History (Salt Lake City: University of Utah Press, 1987). ISBN 0-87480-284-9
- Building the City of God: Community and Cooperation Among the Mormons, with Leonard J. Arrington and Feramorz Y. Fox. (Salt Lake City: Deseret Book, 1976). ISBN 0-87747-590-3
- "Body And Soul: The Record of Mormon Religious Philanthropy," Church History (September, 1988): pp. 322–336.
- From New Deal to New Economics: the American Liberal Response to the Recession of 1937 (New York: Garland Press, 1981) ISBN 0-8240-4862-8
- The Mormon History Association's Tanner Lectures: The First Twenty Years, with Richard L. Bushman, Thomas G. Alexander, Jan Shipps, and Reid Larkin Neilson (University of Illinois Press, ) ISBN 0-252-07288-X
- Three Frontiers: Family, Land, and Society in the American West: 1850-1900 (New York: Cambridge University Press, 1994). ISBN 0-521-58575-9 Winner of the Best Book Award, 1995 from the Mormon History Association.
