= Thomas G. Alexander =

American historian and academic (born 1935)

- Born: Thomas Glen Alexander; August 8, 1935 (age 91); Logan, Utah, U.S.
- Occupations: Historian; academic
- Spouse: Marilyn Johns (m. 1959)
- Children: 5

Academic background
- Education: Weber State University; Utah State University; University of California, Berkeley (PhD)

Thomas Glen Alexander (born August 8, 1935) is an American historian and academic who is a professor emeritus at Brigham Young University (BYU) in Provo, Utah, where he was also Lemuel Hardison Redd, Jr. Professor of Western History and director of the Charles Redd Center for Western Studies. After studying at Weber State University (WSU) and Utah State University (USU), he received a PhD from the University of California, Berkeley (UC Berkeley) in 1965. He taught history at BYU from 1964 until 2004, and served in the leadership of various local and historical organizations.

== Early life and education ==
Alexander was born in Logan, Utah to Glen M. and Violet B. Alexander. He was raised in Ogden, Utah, and from 1956 to 1958 he served a proselytizing mission for the Church of Jesus Christ of Latter-day Saints (LDS Church) in the West German Mission. Alexander earned an associate degree (1955) at WSU, and then both bachelor's (1960) and master's degrees (1961) from USU. While in Logan, Alexander first met Leonard Arrington, who was serving in the LDS Church's university stake presidency. In 1965, Alexander received a PhD in American History from UC Berkeley.

== Career ==
Alexander joined the BYU history faculty in 1964, teaching Utah history and American environmental history. He was the Lemuel Hardison Redd, Jr. Professor of Western American History from 1992 until his retirement in 2004. He was the director of the Charles Redd Center for Wester Studies at BYU from 1980 until 1992. He taught at USU, UC Berkeley, the University of Nebraska at Kearney, Southern Illinois University, and the University of Utah. He has received BYU's highest faculty award, the Karl G. Maeser Distinguished Faculty Lecturer Award. In 2001, he received the Emeriti Alumni Lifetime Achievement Award from WSU.

Alexander has served in various historical and academic organizations. He was president of the Mormon History Association from 1974 until 1975. He has also been president of the Pacific Branch of the American Historical Association; president and fellow of the Utah Academy of Sciences, Arts, and Letters; president of the Association of Utah Historians; chair of the Utah Board of State History; chair of the Utah Humanities Council; national president of Phi Alpha Theta, the history honor society; fellow of the Utah State Historical Society; and chair of BYU's Faculty Advisory Council. He was president of the Sons of Utah Pioneers in 2015 and as of 2019 was on the editorial staff for the organization's publication, Pioneer Magazine.

== Historical perspective ==
Alexander wrote an essay about the epistemological stance of historians practicing "New Mormon History." Alexander identified two parties that seek to define New Mormon History, traditionalists and secularists. He listed Louis C. Midgley and David E. Bohn among the traditionalists who describe New Mormon Historians as positivists. Alexander stated that this is a miscategorization, because New Mormon Historians usually accepted spiritual experiences like Joseph Smith's visions, rather than attributing them to mental illness or fabrication as a positivist might. Some critics of New Mormon History, like Michael T. Walton and E. K. Hunt, made arguments in favor of positivism in response to traditionalist arguments. They argued that God and religious experiences could not be considered objective, and that therefore academic history should not consider them. Alexander placed New Mormon History in the "historicist tradition." Rather than using historical models to predict the future, as a scientist might, historicists use models of history to improve their understanding of history. In a later essay, Alexander described the views of New Mormon Historians as "that of a relativist and a revisionist."

Alexander wrote Things in Heaven and Earth: The Life and Times of Wilford Woodruff, a biography of Wilford Woodruff, the LDS Church's fourth president, which provides insight into the development of Mormonism and the American West. Alexander asserts that Woodruff was "...arguably the third most important figure in all of LDS Church history after Joseph Smith ... and Brigham Young." While other LDS and western historians may disagree with the ranking, his work provides a careful study of a very important leader in the emerging Mormon faith. Writing for Sunstone magazine, Kenneth L. Cannon II called the book "one of the two or three best and most important biographies of nineteenth-century Church leaders."

== Personal life ==
Alexander married Marilyn Johns in 1959 and they are the parents of five children. He has served in various positions in the LDS Church, including as a bishop and stake high councilor. From 2004 to 2005, he and his wife served a Church Educational System mission for the church in Berlin, Germany.

== Awards ==
- 1968 Best Bibliography Award (Mormon History Association)
- 1976 Best Article by a Senior Author (Mormon History Association)
- 1980 Best Article by a Senior Author (Mormon History Association)
- 1986 Best Book Award (Mormon History Association)
- 1989 Grace Fort Arrington Award for Historical Excellence (Mormon History Association)
- 1991 Best Book Award (Mormon History Association)
- 1991 Evans Biography Award (Mountain West Center for Regional Studies)
- 1999 T. Edgar Lyon Award of Excellence (Mormon History Association)

== Publications ==
Alexander has authored, co-authored, edited, or co-edited 25 books and over 150 scholarly articles. He has won numerous awards for his work, including Mormonism in Transition and Things in Heaven and Earth. The Utah state government commissioned Alexander to write Utah: The Right Place as the state's official centennial history.

- A Conflict of Interests, Interior Department and Mountain West, 1863-1896
- The Rise of Multiple-Use Management in the Intermountain West: A History of Region 4 of the Forest Service
- Mormonism in Transition: A History of the Latter-day Saints, 1890-1930
- Mormons and Gentiles: A History of Salt Lake City with James B. Allen
- Things in Heaven and Earth: The Life and Times of Wilford Woodruff, a Mormon Prophet. Signature Books, Incorporated. Salt Lake City, Utah, reprint 1993. ISBN 1-56085-045-0
- Utah: The Right Place
- Line Upon Line: Essays on Mormon Doctrine
- Grace and Grandeur: A History of Salt Lake City
- The New Mormon History: Revisionist Essays on the Past

=== As editor ===
- Manchester Mormons: The Journals of William Clayton, 1840-1842 with James B. Allen
- The Mormon History Association's Tanner Lectures, with Dean L. May, Reid L. Neilson, Richard Bushman (Editor), Jan Shipps (Editor). University of Illinois Press, 2006. ISBN 0-252-07288-X
- Utah's History with Richard Poll, Eugene Campbell, and David Miller
