= Louis C. Midgley =

American academic and Mormon apologist (born 1931)

Louis C. Midgley (born March 12, 1931) is a Mormon apologist and retired professor of political science at Brigham Young University. Since his retirement he has been closely involved with the Foundation for Ancient Research and Mormon Studies, writing many book reviews, articles, and book chapters defending the Church of Jesus Christ of Latter-day Saints (LDS Church) from perceived critics.

== Education and career ==
Midgley studied at the University of Utah for his bachelor's and master's degrees. He took an extended leave to serve as a missionary for the LDS Church in New Zealand 1950–1952. On his mission, he first encountered sectarian anti-Mormon arguments.

He earned a PhD in political science from Brown University. His dissertation focused on Paul Tillich. Midgley taught political science, specifically, the history of political and legal philosophy, at Brigham Young University from 1960 until his retirement in 1996.

== Apologetics ==
In the 1980s, Midgley, along with David Bohn and Neal Kramer, criticized practitioners of New Mormon History. Midgley called the New Mormon Histories an "act of treason" against the LDS faith since they did not take a stance on the LDS Church's truth claims. Midgley wrote that since objectivity in writing history is impossible, that Mormon historians ought to "defend" the faith. Midgley's argument was a familiar one, but his use of antipositivist rhetoric was unfamiliar to Mormon historians. Thomas G. Alexander responded, stating that positivism is a miscategorization, because New Mormon Historians usually accepted spiritual experiences like Joseph Smith's visions, rather than attributing them to mental illness or fabrication as a positivist might. Later, in his Dialogue article on the subject, John-Charles Duffy described Midgley's and Bohn's logic as antimodernist rather than postmodernist.

Midgley often responded to arguments with a style one blogger referred to as "feisty." David Bohn wrote an essay for Sunstone about Mormon historiography, which Thomas Alexander critiqued at length. Informed by this critique, Bohn rewrote portions of the essay, according to Alexander. Bohn's essay, "No Higher Ground," was published in the May–June 1983 issue of Sunstone. Scott C. Dunn, an editor at Sunstone, stated that "a number of historians had gone to great lengths to discourage the publication of this manuscript [...] they sought to prevent distribution of ideas contrary to their own." Midgley described the editorial interventions as censorship, which Alexander described as "intentional misrepresentation and obtuseness." Alexander also accused Midgley of intentionally "misrepresenting the views of others."

Midgley was a frequent defender of Hugh Nibley and published a bibliography of Nibley's complete works. He contributed the article on theology to the Encyclopedia of Mormonism. In 2005-2006 Midgley served as editor of the FARMS Review. Other topics Midgley has studied included the abandonment of a belief in the Book of Mormon as an ancient document by members of the Community of Christ. Midgley has criticized both the writings of Grant H. Palmer and his representations of his career.

== Personal life and church service ==
Following his retirement Midgley and his wife Ireta served as Church Educational System missionaries in New Zealand 1999–2000.
