= Ignacio M. Garcia =

Mexican American author and educator (born 1950)

Ignacio M. Garcia (born 1950) is a Mexican American author and educator. He is the Lemuel H. Redd Jr. professor of Western American History at Brigham Young University. He has written seven books related to Mexican-American politics and history. In 2019 he became the president of the Mormon History Association. Brigham Young University has named a scholarship in his honor.

== Life ==
Garcia was born in Nuevo Laredo, Tamaulipas, Mexico and came to the United States in the mid-1950s. He served as a combat medic in the 477th medical detachment in the U.S. Army and did a tour in Vietnam, 1971–1972, where he headed the emergency room of the Can Tho Army Airbase dispensary. He received his bachelor's degree from Texas A&I University (now Texas A&M University–Kingsville) in 1976. He received his master's and PhD from the University of Arizona. Garcia is a member of the Church of Jesus Christ of Latter-day Saints. While he was a student at the University of Arizona, Garcia served as bishop of the Spanish-speaking LDS ward in Tucson. He also served as bishop in Corpus Christi, Texas in 1995.

While working on his masters and Ph.D., Garcia taught classes at both the University of Arizona and Pima Community College. From 1993 to 1995 Garcia was a professor at Texas A&M University–Corpus Christi. Since 1995 he has been a professor at BYU. While at BYU, Garcia has served on the executive board of the Rey L. Pratt Center for Latin American Studies and the Admissions Committee. He has also served in the Utah Humanities Council, the Tucson Energy Commission, and the Utah Judicial Commission for the Fourth District Court.

Prior to entering academia Garcia worked as a news correspondent and editor. He was the regional editor for Nuestro magazine from 1979–1983. Prior to this he was a sports writer for the Laredo News and a reporter for the San Antonio Express's Westside weekly.

As president of the MHA in 2019 Garcia aimed to make it more inclusive of historical study of the experiences of all Latter-day Saints, especially non-Americans and members of ethnic minorities.

== Writings ==
Garcia has written several books including Viva Kennedy: Mexican Americans in Search of Camelot and Chicanismo. His United We Win: The Rise and Fall of La Raza Unida Party has been widely reviewed. This was the first comprehensive history of the party written. His most recent book is When Mexicans Could Play Ball: Basketball, Race, And Identity in San Antonio, 1928-1945.

Garcia has also written Viva Kennedy, Mexican Americans in Search of Camelot, Hector P. Garcia: In Relentless Pursuit of Justice, and his most current book is White But Not Equal which tells the story of the Supreme Court case Hernandez v. Texas which deals with jury discrimination against Mexican Americans. He is currently working on a sports history.

== Views ==
Garcia is willing to make strong statements on immigration, favoring reform that allows for people to freely flow from Mexico to the USA while wanting to end brain-drain from Mexico. He has been a strong advocate for making the LDS Church more pro-immigrant.

== Works ==
- United We Win: The Rise and Fall of La Raza Unida Party (Mexican American Studies & Research Center (MASRC), The University of Arizona, 1989)
- Chicanismo: The Forging of a Militant Ethos Among Mexican Americans (The University of Arizona Press, 1997)
- Viva Kennedy: Mexican Americans in Search of Camelot (Texas A&M University Press, March 2000)
- Hector P. García: In Relentless Pursuit of Justice (Arté Público Press, January 2003)
- White But Not Equal: Mexican Americans, Jury Discrimination And The Supreme Court (University of Arizona Press, 2009)
- When Mexicans Could Play Ball: Basketball, Race, and Identity in San Antonio, 1928-1945 (University of Texas Press, 2013)
- Chicano While Mormon: Activism, War, and Keeping the Faith (Fairleigh Dickinson University Press, 2015)
- Eduardo Balderas: Father of Church Translation, 1907–1989 (Signature Books, 2024)

== Sources ==
- Garcia's curricula vite
- Embry, Jessie L. (December 1997). In His Own Language: Mormon Spanish Speaking Congregations in the United States. Provo, Utah: Charles Redd Center for Western Studies, Brigham Young University. ISBN 978-1-560-85092-2.
