= Joseph Smith: Rough Stone Rolling =

2005 book by Richard Bushman

- Author: Richard L. Bushman
- Language: English
- Subject: Joseph Smith
- Genre: Biography
- Publisher: Alfred A. Knopf
- Publication date: 2005
- Publication place: United States
- Media type: Print (hardcover)
- Pages: 740
- ISBN: 1-4000-4270-4
- OCLC: 56922457
- Dewey Decimal: 289.3/092 B 22
- LC Class: BX8695.S6 B875 2005
- Followed by: 2007 Vintage Books paperback

Joseph Smith: Rough Stone Rolling is a biography of Joseph Smith, founder and prophet of the Latter Day Saint movement, by historian Richard Bushman. Bushman is both a practicing member of The Church of Jesus Christ of Latter-day Saints and the Gouverneur Morris Professor of History emeritus at Columbia University. Rough Stone Rolling received the 2005 Best Book Award from the Mormon History Association and the 2005 Evans Biography Award from the Mountain West Center for Regional Studies.

== Approach ==
The title of the book refers to a self-description by Smith, "I [am] a rough stone. The sound of the hammer and chisel was never heard on me nor never will be. I desire the learning and wisdom of heaven alone." Bushman is the author of many books on early American cultural and religious history, and his own religious and academic background enables him to locate Smith in the cultural context of early nineteenth-century America.

Although the five-hundred eighty-four page biography (with additional extensive notes and documentation) does not avoid controversial aspects of Smith's life and work, such as his practice of polygamy and his youthful treasure-seeking, it treats them cautiously, and as Bushman himself admits, with "greater tolerance for Smith's remarkable stories than most historians would allow."

== Reception ==
Jane Lampman, reviewing the book for the Christian Science Monitor, called it a fascinating, definitive biography, saying it explored the controversy surrounding Smith without attempting to resolve it, and lauded the book as "an honest yet sympathetic portrayal [...] rich in its depiction of developing Mormonism." Novelist Walter Kirn in The New York Times Book Review says that when reading Bushman's biography, "once the reader despairs of ever finding out whether Smith was God's own spokesman or the L. Ron Hubbard of his day, it's possible to enjoy a tale that's as colorful, suspenseful and unlikely as any in American history." Novelist Larry McMurtry wrote that "the book makes use of much recent research and is the most complete biography of Joseph Smith published to date," but that in reading Bushman, it is difficult to determine "where biography ends and apologetics begin".

In a long academic review, Jan Shipps called the book "the crowning achievement of the new Mormon history," that is "likely to serve as the standard work on Mormonism's coming in to being" for the "foreseeable future". Marvin S. Hill, a retired Brigham Young University professor, wrote in Dialogue that Bushman "comes up markedly short at times and he does not always examine controversial issues carefully" but that "his book suggests that thought about the Prophet has matured among some faithful Latter-day Saints" and that "there is much to praise". In 2011, Laurie Maffly-Kipp, a non-Mormon historian of Mormonism, called Rough Stone Rolling "the definitive account [...] on Joseph Smith’s life and legacy."

In 2007, Bushman published a brief memoir about the publication of Rough Stone Rolling, which outlined both the genesis of the book and the reaction of audiences and reviewers during his yearlong book tour.

== Awards ==
- 2005 Best Book Award from the Mormon History Association
- 2005 Evans Biography Award from the Mountain West Center for Regional Studies at Utah State University

== Publication data ==
- Richard Lyman Bushman, Joseph Smith: Rough Stone Rolling (New York: Alfred A. Knopf, 2005) ISBN 978-1-4000-4270-8 (hardcover)
- Richard Lyman Bushman, Joseph Smith: Rough Stone Rolling (New York: Vintage Books, 2007) ISBN 978-1-4000-7753-3 (paperback)
