= Martha Sonntag Bradley-Evans =

American writer and professor

- Born: Martha Sonntag Bradley; June 18, 1951 (age 74); Salt Lake City, Utah, U.S.
- Occupation: Professor at the University of Utah
- Spouse: Robert Neldon Evans (m. 2002; his death 2013)
- Children: 6

Martha Sonntag Bradley-Evans (born June 18, 1951) is an American academic who is a professor in the College of Architecture and Planning at the University of Utah. She was the president of the Mormon History Association. Bradley-Evans is also the author of several books, and is known for her history of Mormon feminism.

== Early life ==
Martha Sonntag Bradley was born in Salt Lake City, Utah, on June 18, 1951. She had three brothers. Bradley-Evans is a member of the Church of Jesus Christ of Latter-day Saints (LDS Church).

== Career ==
Bradley-Evans was the president of the Mormon History Association. Bradley-Evans was also the co-editor of Dialogue: A Journal of Mormon Thought. The journal encouraged members of the LDS Church to freely express their opinions and promoted discussion of various topics.

Bradley-Evans taught at Brigham Young University (BYU) in the history department, where she was awarded a teaching excellence award. She resigned from BYU in July 1993.

Bradley-Evans began teaching at the University of Utah in 1994, where she has spent most of her career. She was awarded the Distinguished Teaching Award, the Bennion Center Service Learning Professorship, the University Professorship, the Sweet Candy Distinguished Honors Professor Award and the Student's Choice Award among other honors for her teaching. She was appointed the dean of the honors college at the University of Utah in 2002 and served in that position until 2011. She became the associate vice president of academic affairs and the dean of undergraduate studies in 2011. In 2020, the University of Utah awarded Bradley with the Rosenblatt Prize, the highest honor given to a faculty member.

== Personal life ==
Bradley-Evans has six children. She married Robert Evans in 2002; he died in 2013.

== Bibliography ==
- "The Church and Colonel Sanders": Mormon Standard Plan Architecture (1981)
- ZCMI: America's First Department Store (1991)
- Sandy City: The First 100 Years (1993)
- Kidnapped From That Land: The Government Raids on the Short Creek Polygamists (1993)
- A History of Beaver County (1999)
- A History of Kane County (1999)
- 4 Zinas: A Story of Mothers and Daughters on the Mormon Frontier (2000)
- Pedestals and Podiums: Utah Women, Religious Authority, and Equal Rights (2005)
- Salt Lake City: Yesterday and Today (2010)
- Plural Wife: The Life Story of Mabel Finlayson Allred (2012)
- Glorious in Persecution: Joseph Smith, American Prophet, 1839–1844 (2016)
- An Architectural Travel Guide to Utah, 2020

== Awards and accomplishments ==
Bradley-Evans received the Teaching Excellence Award from both BYU and the Distinguished Teaching Award from the University of Utah.

She was appointed chair of the Utah Heritage Foundation in 2006. That same year, was also made the vice chair of the Utah State Board of History. Bradley-Evans received the Honorary AIA from Utah's American Institute of Architects in 2009. Bradley-Evans received the Outstanding Achievement Award from the YWCA in 2013 and was made a Fellow of the Utah State Historical Society in 2013. She was also awarded the Mormon History Association's highest honor in 2013, the Leonard J. Arrington Award. The Communal Studies Association gave Bradley-Evans the Distinguished Scholar Award in 2017.
