= Benjamin Park =

American historian

Benjamin E. Park
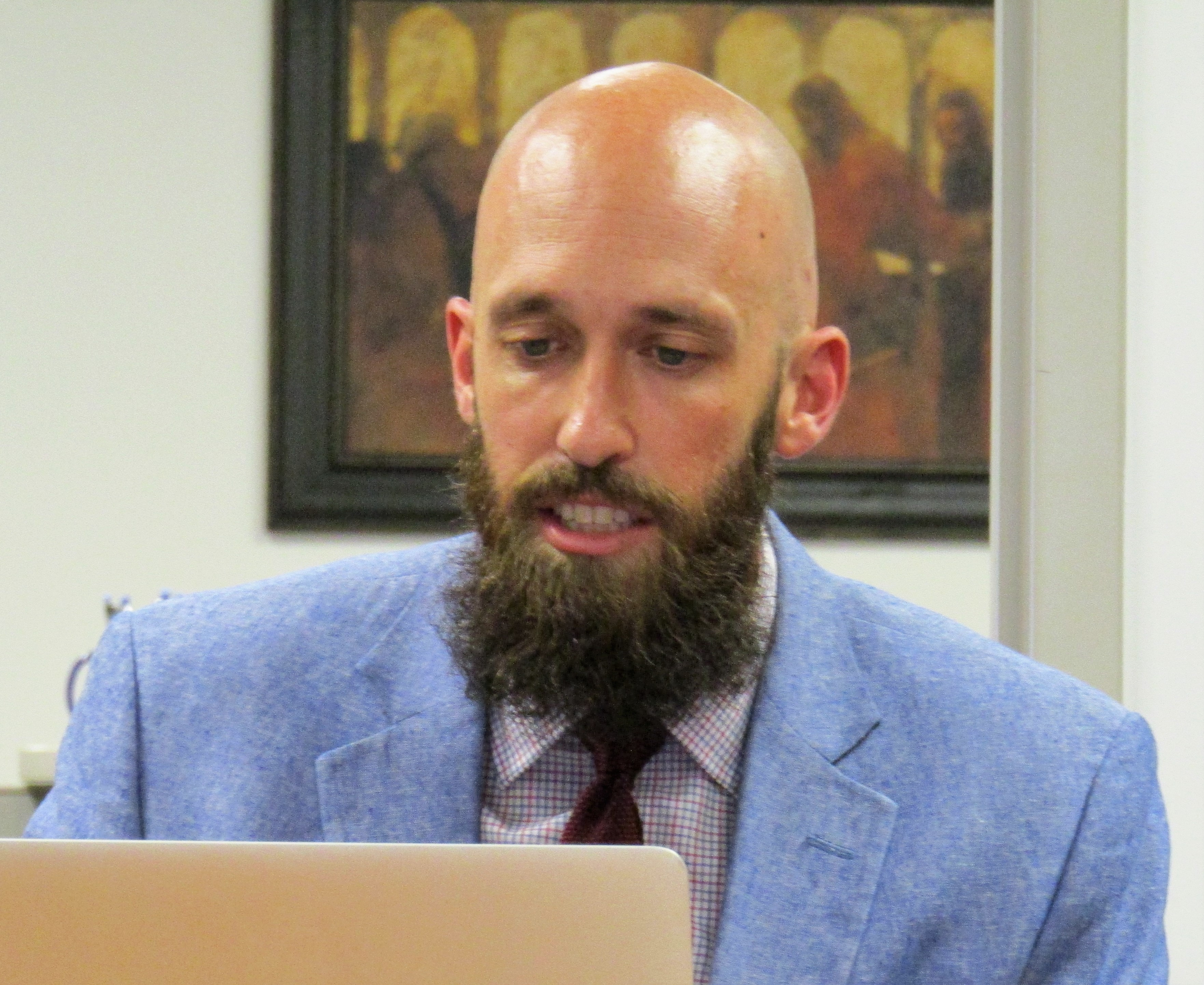
- Education: Brigham Young; U. of Edinburgh (MS, historical theology, 2010); Cambridge (M. Phil., political and intellectual history, 2011; PhD, history, 2014)
- Occupations: Author, historian, academic journal co-editor
- Employer: Sam Houston State University
- Awards: 2021 Best Book Award, Mormon History Association (MHA); 2011 New Voices Award, Dialogue Foundation; 2011 and 2013 J. Talmage Jones Awards of Excellence, MHA
- Website: ProfessorPark.Wordpress.com

Benjamin E. Park is an American historian concentrating on early American political, religious, and intellectual history, history of gender, religious studies, slavery, anti-slavery, and Atlantic history. Park is an associate professor at Sam Houston State University.

== Career ==
Park is co-editor of Mormon Studies Review (2019–), a member of the executive committee of the Mormon History Association (2017–), editor of the Mormon Studies [book] Series for Fairleigh Dickinson University Press (2016–), a member of the editorial board of the Journal of Mormon History (2012–2015), a founder and editor of The Junto: A Group Blog on Early American History (2012–), a founder and co-editor of the Patheos.com column Peculiar People (2012–2015), a member of the editorial board of Dialogue: A Journal of Mormon Thought (2011–2012), and a founder and contributing editor at Juvenile Instructor: A Mormon History Blog (2007–).

A review of Park's American Nationalisms in Journal of the Early Republic said, "Park’s ambition is the source of this book’s strengths and of most of its shortcomings"; and, a review in Journal of American History said that Park "argues that the Revolution severed the one thing Americans had in common, that they were subjects of the British Crown. The lack of definition in American nationhood fostered grave anxieties for the country's future. To fill the gap and unify the citizenry, thinkers in the early republic cultivated particularist visions of American character and destiny and projected them onto the country as a whole. These notions were regionally grounded." The book was a finalist for Johns Hopkins University Press's Sally and Morris Lasky Prize for Political History.

Kingdom of Nauvoo (2020) is described in Publishers Weekly as Park's "fastidiously researched" telling of the Latter Day Saints "'kingdom of Nauvoo' in western Illinois. [...] Park, who was given extensive access to the Mormon Church’s archives, entertainingly establishes this little-known Mormon settlement’s proper place within the formative years of the Illinois and Missouri frontier." According to its Kirkus review, the aspirations of the Latter Day Saints that Park documents in the book "involved a repudiation of the [U.S.] Constitution in favor of a document called the Council of Fifty, which, [according to Park], 'rejected America’s democratic system as a failed experiment and sought to replace it with a theocratic kingdom.'"

During 2014, a book review by Park (viz. of David F. Holland's Sacred Borders: Continuing Revelation and Canonical Restraint in Early America) catalyzed some controversy among the Mormon apologetics community. In his review, Park advocated for employing the robustly secular framework of nineteenth-century historical studies to engage the greater religious studies academy on Book of Mormon studies.

In 2017, Park joined twenty other Mormon studies scholars in signing a friend-of-the-court brief filed with the U.S. Supreme Court with regard to its review of Trump administration's travel bans. The brief draws parallels between historical U.S. government-promoted anti-Mormon sentiments and the allegedly anti-Muslim atmosphere of the proposed bans. In 2017 Park was among ten co-authors who published the online pamphlet "Shoulder to the Wheel: Resources to Help Latter-day Saints Face Racism."

== Education and early life ==
Park received his bachelor's degree in both English and history from Brigham Young University in 2009. He then went on to study at the University of Edinburgh. Afterwards, he studied at the University of Cambridge, completing a doctorate there in 2014. Before joining the faculty of Sam Houston State in 2016, Park lectured at the University of Missouri as the inaugural postdoctoral fellow in history at the Kinder Institute on Constitutional Democracy (2014–2016) and at the University of Cambridge (2012–2014) as a supervisor and lecturer in history.

As a young Latter-day Saint, Park served as a missionary for the Church of Jesus Christ of Latter-day Saints in the Washington, D.C., area.

== Publications ==
- American Nationalisms: Imagining Union in the Age of Revolutions, 1783-1833. Cambridge University Press. 2018. ISBN 978-1108420372.
- Benjamin E. Park, ed. (2020). A Companion to American Religious History. Wiley Blackwell Companions to American History. John Wiley & Sons. ISBN 9781119583660.
- Kingdom of Nauvoo: The Rise and Fall of a Religious Empire on the American Frontier. Liveright. 2020. ISBN 978-1631494864.
- Taylor G. Petrey & Amy Hoyt, ed. (2020). "Joseph Smith, Plural Marriage, and Kinship". The Routledge Handbook of Mormonism and Gender. Routledge. doi:10.4324/9781351181600. ISBN 9780815395218. S2CID 214472324.
- Benjamin E. Park, ed. (2021). A Companion to American Religious History. Wiley-Blackwell. ISBN 978-1-119-58366-0.
- American Zion: A New History of Mormonism. Liveright. 2024. ISBN 9781631498657.

Park has written reference-book entries, journal articles, book reviews, essays, and op-eds.

- Benjamin E. Park (May 14, 2020). "How An 1843 Revelation on Polygamy Poses A Serious Challenge to Modern Mormonism". Religion Dispatches.

== Sources ==
- Sam Houston State University bio
- "By Common Consent" bio
