= Mario De Pillis =

American historian (1926–2021)

- Born: Mario S. De Pillis; January 22, 1926; Philadelphia, Pennsylvania, U.S.
- Died: November 18, 2021 (aged 95)
- Education: University of Chicago; Yale University (PhD)
- Occupation: Historian

Mario S. De Pillis (January 22, 1926, in Philadelphia, Pennsylvania – November 18, 2021) was an emeritus professor of American Religious history at the University of Massachusetts Amherst. De Pillis specialized in the history of such groups as the Latter-day Saints and Shakers. He was the second president of the Mormon History Association who was not a member of The Church of Jesus Christ of Latter-day Saints, any other Latter-day Saint movement church, or a former member of any such church.

De Pillis had a bachelor's and master's degree from the University of Chicago and a Ph.D. from Yale University.

De Pillis and his wife, the former Freda M. Rustemeyer, were the parents of three sons. De Pillis was a Catholic.

== Sources ==
- Article by Jan Shipps mentioning some of De Pillis' work
