= William D. Russell (historian) =

American historian

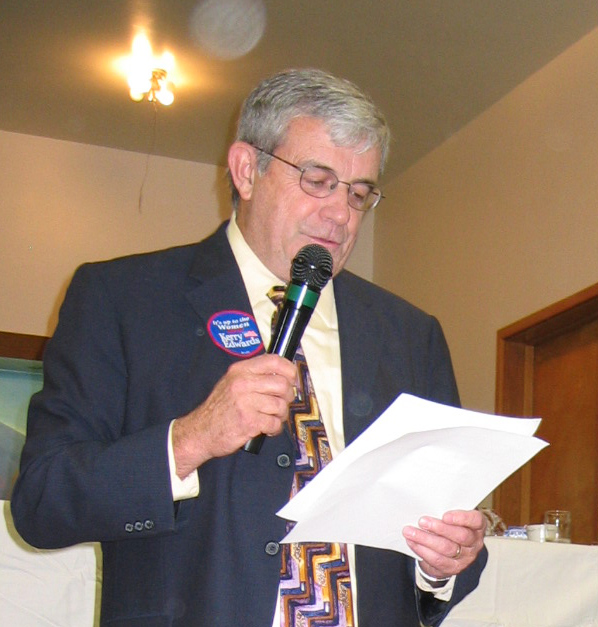
Historian William D. Russell addresses a meeting of the John Whitmer Historical Association

William Dean Russell (born 1938) is an American historian focusing on the history of the Latter Day Saint movement. Russell taught at Graceland University for forty-one years, retiring as a professor of history in 2007. He has been a civil rights activist since the 1960s, championing the causes of equality for all regardless of race, gender, or sexual orientation. A member of Community of Christ, Russell is one of the activists and leaders credited with the church's progressive transformation in the latter half of the twentieth century.

== Academic career ==
Russell graduated from Graceland in 1960. He later received a masters of divinity (M.Div.) from the Saint Paul School of Theology and a J.D. from the University of Iowa.

Russell served as editor of Courage: A Journal of History, Thought, and Action throughout its entire run from 1970 to 1973. He was a founding member of the John Whitmer Historical Association and has served as the organization's president (1977) and executive secretary (1979–81). He also served as editor of the John Whitmer Historical Association Journal (1984–85). Russell was one of the original three Community of Christ historians to join the Mormon History Association and he later served as president of that organization.

Russell's first book Treasure in Earthen Vessels an Introduction to the New Testament was published in 1966 by Herald Publishing House. Since that time his research on the Latter Day Saint movement has been published widely in journals, but the only book-length study that has appeared is his 2008 edited volume, Homosexual Saints: The Community of Christ Experience.

== Social activism ==
Russell became active in the civil rights movement in the 1960s and was co-founder of the Independence, Missouri, chapter of the Congress on Racial Equality (CORE). As editor of Courage, in the early 1970s, Russell advocated women's ordination to the priesthood of the Reorganized Church of Jesus Christ of Latter Day Saints (now Community of Christ). This policy change became a reality when women began to be ordained in 1985. Also as editor of Courage, Russell advocated that the RLDS Church abandon lineal succession in the office of Prophet-President. This policy change became a reality with the ordination of W. Grant McMurray in 1996.

In recent years Russell has advocated for full participation of gay, lesbian, transsexual, and transgender members in the Community of Christ. In recognition of his work, Affirmation awarded its 2011 Affirmation Allies Award to Russell and his wife Lois.

== Published scholarship ==
- William D. Russell, "A Further Inquiry into the Historicity of the Book of Mormon," Sunstone (September–October 1982): 20.
- William D. Russell, "History and the Mormon Scriptures," Journal of Mormon History Vol. 10 (1983): 53.
- William D. Russell, "Beyond Literalism," Dialogue: A Journal of Mormon Thought, Vol. 19, No. 1 (Spring 1986): 57.
- William D. Russell, "The RLDS Church and Biblical Criticism: The Early Response," John Whitmer Historical Association Journal Vol. 7 (1987): 62.
- William D. Russell, "'It Just Wasn't Working': The Fragmentation of the Reorganized Church" John Whitmer Historical Association Journal Nauvoo Conference Special Edition (2002): 7.
- William D. Russell, "A Brief History of the John Whitmer Historical Association" John Whitmer Historical Association Journal Nauvoo Conference Special Edition (2002): 147.
- William D. Russell, "Ordaining Women and the Transformation from Sect to Denomination," Dialogue: A Journal of Mormon Thought Vol. 36, No. 3 (Fall 2003): 61.
- William D. Russell, "Grant McMurray and the Succession Crisis in the Community of Christ," Dialogue: A Journal of Mormon Thought, Vol. 39, No. 4 (Winter 2006): 27.
- William D. Russell, "Blaming the Victim: The Miscarriage of Justice in the Case of Alice Lundgren," John Whitmer Historical Association Journal Vol. 27 (2007): 139.
