= Mormon History Association =

Organization to study Mormon history

The Mormon History Association (MHA) is an independent, non-profit organization dedicated to the study and understanding of all aspects of Mormon history to promote understanding, scholarly research, and publication in the field. MHA was founded in December 1965 at the American Historical Association (AHA) meeting in San Francisco under the leadership of Latter-day Saint and historian Leonard J. Arrington. In 1972, MHA became an independent organization with its own annual conferences and publications. The Journal of Mormon History, the official biennial publication of the association, began publication in 1974. MHA also publishes the quarterly Mormon History Newsletter and is an affiliate of both AHA and the Western History Association.

MHA "welcome[s] all who are interested in the Mormon past, irrespective of religious affiliation, academic training, or world location." It is not formally affiliated with the LDS Church. Its members are composed of people both within and without the Church of Jesus Christ of Latter-day Saints (LDS Church) and the Community of Christ, including those who reject Mormonism.

== Presidents ==
MHA presidents are recognized contributors to the field of Mormon history and serve for one year.

Years	Name	Prominence at the time of service
1966–67	Leonard J. Arrington	MHA co-founder; Utah State University historian; author of Great Basin Kingdom
1967–68	Eugene E. Campbell	Brigham Young University (BYU) history professor
1968–69	T. Edgar Lyon	Nauvoo Restoration
1969–70	S. George Ellsworth	Utah State University history professor
1970–71	Richard D. Poll	Western Illinois University vice-president; former BYU historian
1971–72	Davis Bitton	MHA co-founder; University of Utah history professor
1972–73	James B. Allen	MHA co-founder; BYU history professor
1973–74	Reed C. Durham Jr.	Director of Institute of Religion at the University of Utah
1974–75	Thomas G. Alexander	BYU history professor
1975–76	Charles S. Peterson	University of Utah historian; former director of USHS
1976–77	Paul M. Edwards	
1977–78	Douglas D. Alder	USU history professor and director of honors program
1978–79	Milton V. Backman	BYU Religious Education professor
1979–80	Jan Shipps	Indiana University professor of history and religious studies
1980–81	Dean C. Jessee	Joseph Smith researcher and archivist with the LDS Church.
1981–82	Melvin T. Smith	
1982–83	William D. Russell	Professor of history at Graceland University
1983–84	Kenneth W. Godfrey	LDS Institute of Religion Director
1984–85	Maureen U. Beecher	BYU English professor with the Joseph Fielding Smith Institute.
1985–86	Richard L. Bushman	Columbia University historian; author of Joseph Smith and the Beginnings of Mormonism
1986–87	Richard W. Sadler	
1987–88	Valeen Tippetts Avery	Northern Arizona University historian, Co-author of Mormon Enigma: Emma Hale Smith
1988–89	Stanley B. Kimball	SIU Edwardsville historian; biographer of Heber C. Kimball
1989–90	Carol Cornwall Madsen	BYU historian with the Joseph Fielding Smith Institute.
1990–91	Richard P. Howard	World Church Historian of the RLDS Church
1991–92	Ronald W. Walker	BYU history professor
1992–93	Marvin S. Hill	BYU historian; author of Quest for Refuge: The Mormon Flight from American Pluralism
1993–94	Roger D. Launius	JWHA president; chief historian for NASA
1994–95	Mario De Pillis	Professor of American Religious history at the University of Massachusetts Amherst
1995–96	David J. Whittaker	Brigham Young University archivist
1996–97	Linda King Newell	historian; author of Mormon Enigma; editor of Dialogue; JWHA president
1997–98	Armand L. Mauss	WSU professor of sociology and religious studies
1998–99	Jill Mulvay Derr	BYU historian; authored women's histories
1999–2000	Newell G. Bringhurst	
2000–01	William G. Hartley	Director of the Family History and Genealogy Research Center at BYU
2001–02	Dean L. May	University of Utah historian specializing in social history of the American West
2002–03	Lawrence Foster	Georgia Institute of Technology professor of history, technology, and society
2003–04	Martha Sonntag Bradley	
2004–05	Donald Q. Cannon	Brigham Young University professor
2005–06	Philip L. Barlow	Professor of theology and American religious history at Hanover College
2006–07	Ronald K. Esplin	Joseph Smith Papers Project director; BYU historian; Joseph Fielding Smith Institute director
2007–08	Paul L. Anderson	BYU Museum of Art curator
2008–09	Kathryn M. Daynes	BYU historian; author of More Wives Than One
2009–10	Ronald E. Romig	Community of Christ archivist
2010–11	William P. MacKinnon	Independent historian; author of At Sword's Point
2011–12	Richard L. Jensen	Research historian with LDS Church History Department
2012–13	Glen M. Leonard	Independent historian; author of Nauvoo
2013–14	Richard E. Bennett	BYU professor of Church History and Doctrine
2014–15	Laurel Thatcher Ulrich	Harvard University historian of early America and women; Pulitzer and Bancroft winner
2015–16	Laurie Maffly-Kipp	Professor at Danforth Center on Religion and Politics, Washington University in St. Louis
2016–17	Brian Q. Cannon	BYU historian and director of the Charles Redd Center
2017–18	Patrick Q. Mason	Utah State University Arrington Chair of Mormon History and Culture, professor of history; former Howard W. Hunter Chair at Claremont University
2018–19	W. Paul Reeve	University of Utah professor of history and the director of graduate studies in the history department
2019–20	Ignacio M. Garcia	Lemuel H. Redd Jr. professor of Western American History at Brigham Young University
2020–21	Jenny Lund	Director of the Historic Sites Division of the Church History Department
2021–22	Claudia Bushman	Professor of American Studies emerita at Columbia University
2022–23	Matthew Bowman	Howard W. Hunter Chair of Mormon Studies, Claremont Graduate University
2023–24	David Howlett	Mellon Visiting Assistant Professor of Religion at Smith College
2024–25	Andrea Radke-Moss	Department of History and Political Science, at BYU-Idaho
2026–	Benjamin Park	Sam Houston State University

== Journal of Mormon History ==
Cover of the Fall 2008 issue (Vol. 34, No. 4). Covers between 1991 and 2009 were variations on this abstracted window from the Salt Lake City Tenth Ward building.

Since 1974, MHA has produced the Journal of Mormon History, an academic journal in the field of Mormon studies. From the founding of MHA until 1974, Dialogue: A Journal of Mormon Thought was a principal venue for articles on Mormon History written by MHA members.

A DVD archive of past issues of the journal is available at MHA's web site.

=== List of editors ===
Name	Position	Term
Richard Sadler	Editor	1974–1981
Dean L. May	Editor	1982–1985
Leonard J. Arrington	Editor	1986–1987
Lowell M. Durham Jr.	Editor	1988–1990
Lavina Fielding Anderson	Editor	1991–2009
Martha P. Taysom	Editor	2009–2016
Jessie L. Embry	Editor	2016–2019
Christopher James Blythe; Jessie L. Embry	Co-editors	2020–2022
Christopher Cannon Jones; Jessie L. Embry	Co-editors	2023-2024
Christopher Cannon Jones	Editor	2024-

== Mormon History Association Awards ==
Among the awards presented by the association are: the Leonard J. Arrington Award "for distinguished and meritorious service to Mormon history" – named for the MHA's founder, and father of New Mormon history; Best Book Award; Best First Book; Best Documentary or Bibliography; Best Biography; an award for an outstanding International Mormon history; an award for an outstanding history of a Mormon family (or grouping of families in one community).
