= Maris Vinovskis =

American historian

Maris A. Vinovskis (born 1943) is a retired American academic and historian and a leading authority on U.S. social, demographic, educational and family history, as well as presidential policies. Since 2019 he is the A. M. and H. P. Bentley Professor of History emeritus at the University of Michigan. He taught there 1974 to 2019 and is a former chairman of the department of history. He was born January 1, 1943 in Riga, Latvia; with his family he immigrated to the U.S. in 1949 from West Germany and became a naturalized U.S. citizen in 1961. Vinovskis holds a B.A. from Wesleyan University, 1965, and a Ph.D. from Harvard University, 1975. He has received a Guggenheim fellowship and was elected to the National Academy of Education, the International Academy of Education, and President of the History of Education Society.

According to Michael B. Katz, "More than any other historians, Carl Kaestle and Maris Vinovskis have injected educational historiography into the mainstream of twentieth-century American social science." In 1978, Vinovskis was the Deputy Staff Director to the U.S. House Select Committee on Population and served as a consultant on population and adolescent pregnancy issues in the U.S. Department of Health, Education, and Welfare in the early 1980s. During both the George H. W. Bush and Bill Clinton administrations, he worked as a Research Advisor to the Assistant Secretary of the Office of Educational Research and Improvement (OERI) on questions of educational research and policy. Vinovskis was a member of the congressionally mandated Independent Review Panels for Goals 2000 and No Child Left Behind.

== Publications ==
- Demographic History and the World Population Crisis (Clark University Press 1976).
- (With Carl F. Kaestle) Education and Social Change in Nineteenth-Century Massachusetts (Cambridge UP, 1980).
- Fertility in Massachusetts from the Revolution to the Civil War (Academic Press, 1981). online
- The Origins of Public High Schools (U of Wisconsin Press, 1985)
- An "Epidemic" of Adolescent Pregnancy? (Oxford UP, 1988)\
- (With Gerald F. Moran) Religion, Family, and the Life Course: Explorations in the Social History of Early America (U of Michigan Press 1992).
- Education, Society and Economic Opportunity" (Yale UP, 1995)
- History and Educational Policymaking (Yale UP, 1999)
- Revitalizing Federal Education Research (U of Michigan Press, 2001)
- "Have social historians lost the Civil War?: Some preliminary demographic speculations." in The Civil War Soldier (New York UP, 2002) pp. 33–43.
- The Birth of Head Start (U of Chicago Press, 2005)
- From a Nation at Risk to No Child Left Behind (Teachers College Press, 2009). online
- "Historical perspectives on the development of the family and parent-child interactions." in Parenting across the life span (Routledge, 2017) pp. 295–312.
- "History of testing in the United States: PK–12 education." The ANNALS of the American Academy of Political and Social Science 683.1 (2019): 22-37.
- "Federal compensatory education policies from Lyndon B. Johnson to Barack H. Obama." History of Education Quarterly 62.3 (2022): 243-267. online
