= Richard Bushman =

American historian and academic (born 1931)

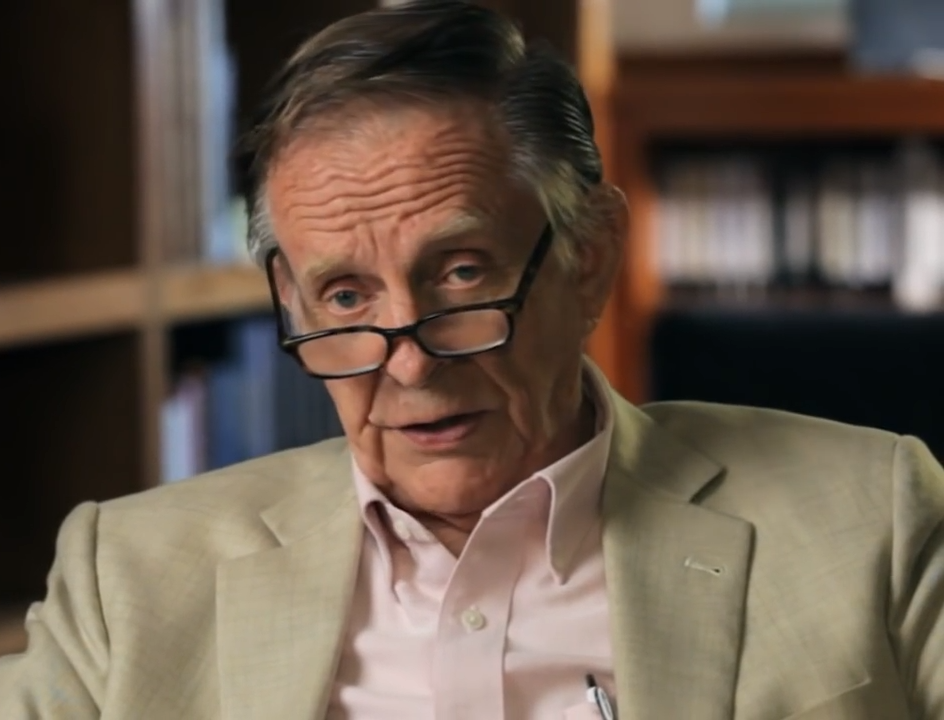
- Bushman in the 2016 film By Study and Also by Faith
- Born: Richard Lyman Bushman; June 20, 1931 (age 95); Salt Lake City, Utah, U.S.
- Spouse: Claudia Lauper Bushman (m. 1955)

Academic background
- Education: Harvard University (BA, MA, PhD)
- Thesis: Government and Society in Connecticut, 1690–1760 (1961)
- Doctoral advisor: Oscar Handlin
- Other advisor: Bernard Bailyn

Academic work
- Discipline: History
- Sub-discipline: Colonial American history; Mormon history
- School or tradition: New Mormon history
- Institutions: Columbia University
- Notable works: Joseph Smith: Rough Stone Rolling (2005)

Richard Lyman Bushman (born June 20, 1931) is an American historian and Gouverneur Morris Professor Emeritus of History at Columbia University, having previously taught at Brigham Young University, Harvard University, Boston University, and the University of Delaware. Bushman is the author of Joseph Smith: Rough Stone Rolling, a biography of Joseph Smith, progenitor of the Latter Day Saint movement. Bushman also was an editor for the Joseph Smith Papers Project and now serves on the national advisory board. Bushman has been called "one of the most important scholars of American religious history" of the late-20th century. In 2012, a $3-million donation to the University of Virginia established the Richard Lyman Bushman Chair of Mormon Studies in his honor.

== Biography ==
By Study and Also By Faith documentary

Richard L. Bushman was born on June 20, 1931, in Salt Lake City, Utah. His father, Ted Bushman (1902–1980), was a fashion illustrator, advertiser, and department store executive, and his mother, Dorothy Bushman (née Lyman; 1908–1995), was a secretary and homemaker. Bushman grew up as a member of The Church of Jesus Christ of Latter-day Saints (LDS Church). When he was a young child, Bushman's family moved to Portland, Oregon.

Graduating from high school in 1949, Bushman matriculated at Harvard University. After taking time off from those studies to serve for two years as a Latter-day Saint missionary in the northeastern United States, he graduated in 1955 with a Bachelor of Arts degree magna cum laude in history. Bushman married fellow historian Claudia Lauper Bushman in August 1955, and the couple reared six children. Bushman continued at Harvard, earning Master of Arts and Doctor of Philosophy degrees in the history of American civilization, studying with the early American historian Bernard Bailyn. Bushman received a Sheldon Fellowship to work on his dissertation in London.

Bushman taught at Brigham Young University from 1960 to 1968, though two of those years he spent studying history and psychology on a doctoral fellowship at Brown University. In 1968, he won the Bancroft Prize for his published dissertation, From Puritan to Yankee: Character and the Social Order in Connecticut, 1690–1765. Bushman was awarded a year-long fellowship in 1969 at Harvard's Charles Warren Center and then was recruited to teach by Boston University. In 1977, Bushman moved to the University of Delaware to work with material culture resources at the Winterthur Museum. Bushman's "major work on refinement and gentility dated from those years, which included a year-long fellowship at the Smithsonian Institution." In 1989, Bushman was asked to teach American colonial history at Columbia University. In 1992, Bushman was named the first Gouverneur Morris Professor of History. During his time at Columbia, he completed year-long fellowships at the Davis Center at Princeton, the National Humanities Center, and the Huntington Library. At the latter, in 1997, Bushman began writing a biography of Joseph Smith, Rough Stone Rolling, and he retired from Columbia in 2001 in order to complete it. From 2008 to 2011, Bushman served as the first Howard W. Hunter Chair of Mormon Studies at Claremont Graduate University and held a Huntington Library fellowship. In 2012, the University of Virginia established the Richard Lyman Bushman Chair of Mormon Studies in the Department of Religious Studies, the chair funded with a $3-million endowment by anonymous donors. Outside professoriate settings, in the twenty-first century Bushman also worked as an editor and later a national advisory board member for the Joseph Smith Papers, a project of the Church History Department.

Bushman has continued writing both early American and Mormon history. In 2018, Yale University Press published his The American Farmer in the Eighteenth Century: A Social and Cultural History. By 2020, Bushman had spent almost a decade intermittently writing a cultural history of the golden plates that Joseph Smith had described as the source of the Book of Mormon.

== Awards and honors ==
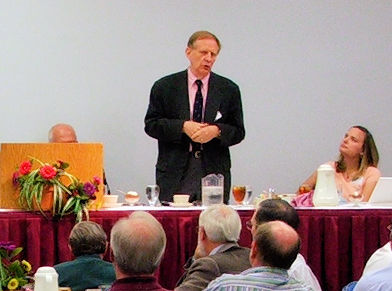
Bushman addressing the John Whitmer Historical Association in 2011

Bushman's scholarship includes studies of early American social, cultural, and political history; American religious history, and early Latter-day Saint history. In 1968, Bushman's From Puritan to Yankee: Character and Social Order in Connecticut, 1690–1765 won the Bancroft Prize, an award given by the trustees of Columbia University for the year's best book on American history. Bushman has also received the Phi Alpha Theta prize, and Evans Biography Awards, administered by the Mountain West Center for Regional Studies at Utah State University. He published Joseph Smith and the Beginnings of Mormonism, which was awarded best biography from the Mormon History Association in 1985. Bushman has held Guggenheim, Huntington, National Humanities Center, and National Endowment for the Humanities fellowships; and served as president of the Mormon History Association (1985–1986). Bushman was honored at the January 2011 annual meeting of the American Historical Association where a breakout session entitled "A Retrospective on the Scholarship of Richard Bushman" was heavily attended.

=== Rough Stone Rolling ===
Bushman's Joseph Smith: Rough Stone Rolling, a biography of Latter Day Saint movement founder Joseph Smith, has been called the "crowning achievement of the new Mormon history". Joseph Smith: Rough Stone Rolling sold over 100,000 copies and gathered many awards including the Evans Biography Award and the Mormon History Association's annual 2006 Best Book award. According to an article by the Los Angeles Times writer Larry Gordon, the initial response to the biography "garnered many positive reviews, although some critics said it uncomfortably straddled reverence and logic."

== Religion ==
Bushman grew up in a practicing Latter-day Saint family. As a young adult, he entered undergraduate studies at Harvard and there found himself struggling to communicate his religious beliefs in an environment in which logical positivism was current. I. Bernard Cohen, a mentor to Bushman in Harvard's history and science concentration, told him that most people at Harvard "thought Mormonism is garbage". Unsure how to reply, Bushman began wondering if there was "enough evidence to believe in God", becoming "drawn toward agnosticism" as a result. Even so, Bushman interrupted his studies at Harvard to serve as a missionary for the church in New England and Atlantic Canada where he overcame doubts about the existence of God and became convinced that the Book of Mormon was right. Bushman has opined in retrospect, "If I was such a doubter, why did I go into the mission field where I would be called on to testify of my beliefs virtually every day? ... I have come to believe that in actuality my problem was not faith but finding the words to express my faith."

Bushman later held various religious callings within the LDS Church, including seminary teacher, bishop, stake president, and stake patriarch. On his decision to study the religion he is affiliated with Bushman replied, "Would you say that the only people who can do black studies are not blacks, or that to do women's studies you have to be a non-woman? You get all sorts of people who have deep personal commitments to a subject they teach, and that has its advantages."

== Publications ==
- From Puritan to Yankee: Character and the Social Order in Connecticut, 1690–1765. Harvard University Press, 1967. ISBN 0-674-32551-6
- Joseph Smith and the Beginnings of Mormonism. University of Illinois Press, 1984. ISBN 0-252-01143-0 OCLC 749000008
- King and People in Provincial Massachusetts. University of North Carolina Press, 1985. ISBN 0-8078-1624-8 OCLC 40143451
- Great Awakening: Documents on the Revival of Religion, 1740–1745. Institute of Early American History, University of North Carolina Press, Textbook reprint 1989. ISBN 0-8078-4260-5 OCLC 1154932101
- The Refinement of America: Persons, Houses, Cities. Random House, Incorporated, 1993. ISBN 0-679-74414-2
- Building the Kingdom: A History of Mormons in America, with Claudia Lauper Bushman. Oxford University Press, 2001. ISBN 0-19-515022-8
- Believing History: Latter-Day Saint Essays, Edited by Jed Woodworth. Columbia University Press, 2004. ISBN 0-231-13006-6 OCLC 872978355
- Joseph Smith: Rough Stone Rolling. Alfred Knopf, 2005. ISBN 1-4000-4270-4 OCLC 85813960
- The Mormon History Association's Tanner Lectures, with Dean L. May, Reid L. Neilson, Thomas G. Alexander (Editor), Jan Shipps (Editor). University of Illinois Press, 2006. ISBN 0-252-07288-X
- On the Road with Joseph Smith: An Author's Diary. Greg Kofford Books, 2007. ISBN 978-1-58958-102-9 OCLC 123029410
- Mormonism: A Very Short Introduction. Oxford University Press, 2008. ISBN 0-19-531030-6 OCLC 179802646
- The American Farmer in the Eighteenth Century: A Social and Cultural History. Yale University Press, 2018. ISBN 9780300235203 OCLC 1035556249

== See also ==
- AML Awards
- Historians of the Latter Day Saint movement
- Mormonism and history

Professional and academic associations
Preceded by Maureen Ursenbach Beecher	President of the Mormon History Association; 1985–1986	Succeeded by Richard W. Sadler
Awards
Preceded by William W. Freehling	Bancroft Prize; 1968; With: Bernard Bailyn and Henry Allen Bullock	Succeeded by Winthrop Jordan
Preceded by Charles Coleman Sellers	Bancroft Prize; 1968; With: Bernard Bailyn and Henry Allen Bullock	Succeeded by N. Gordon Levin Jr.
Preceded by James Sterling Young	Bancroft Prize; 1968; With: Bernard Bailyn and Henry Allen Bullock	Succeeded by Rexford Tugwell
