= New Mormon history =

Style of reporting the history of Mormonism

New Mormon history refers to a style of reporting the history of Mormonism by both Mormon and non-Mormon scholars which departs from earlier more polemical or faith-based styles of history. Rather than presenting material selectively to either prove or disprove Mormonism, the focus of new Mormon history is to present history in a more humanistic and dispassionate way, and to situate Mormon history in a fuller historical context. Because it is a break from past historical narratives, new Mormon history tends to be revisionist. In many cases, the new Mormon history follows the perspectives and techniques of new history, including cultural history. The Mormon historian Richard Bushman described it as "a quest for identity rather than a quest for authority." New Mormon historians include a wide range of both Mormon and non-Mormon scholars, the most prominent of which include Bushman, Jan Shipps, D. Michael Quinn, Terryl Givens, Leonard J. Arrington, Richard P. Howard, Fawn Brodie, and Juanita Brooks.

== History ==
D. Michael Quinn dates new Mormon history as beginning in 1950 with Juanita Brooks' publication of "The Mountain Meadows Massacre" by Stanford University Press. He notes, however, that it had been gaining momentum even before that, citing that B. H. Roberts—church historian from 1901 until his death in 1933—"exemplified much of the philosophy later identified with the New Mormon History." Clyde R. Forsberg Jr. credits Leonard J. Arrington, beginning in the 1950s, with having "led the charge" of new Mormon history, with non-Mormon scholars Thomas O'Dea and Whitney O. Cross responding in kind with "less prejudiced and more informed monographs on Mormonism".

== Associated groups and publications ==
In the 1960s, a new generation of Mormon scholars emerged. The publication of Dialogue: A Journal of Mormon Thought, the newly-established Mormon History Association, and the professionalization of LDS and RLDS history departments provided spaces for historians to do new research in Mormon topics. RLDS scholars founded the John Whitmer Historical Association in 1972. In 1974, Claudia Bushman and Laurel Thatcher Ulrich founded the magazine Exponent II. The first issue of BYU Studies was published in 1959.

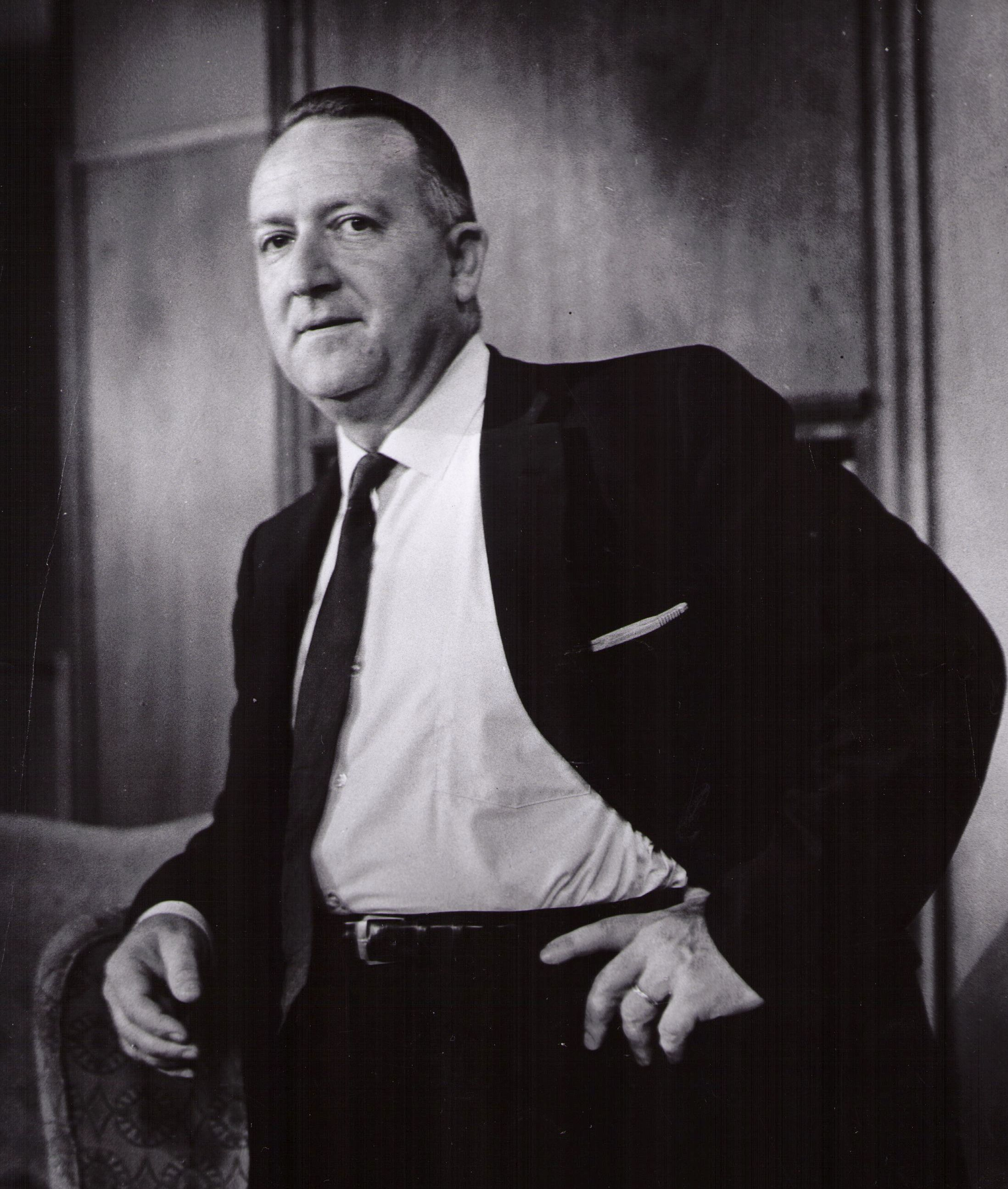
Leonard Arrington

Also in 1972, the LDS Church hired Leonard Arrington as their historian. During Arrington's time as historian, Mormon and non-Mormon historians were allowed to access the LDS Church Archives. Much of the research in the 1970s used these newly-available sources to examine church history, sometimes in great detail. Leonard Arrington influenced important scholars of Mormon history, including Richard Jensen, William Hartley, and Ronald Walker. In 1969, Jewish historian Moses Rischin named the increasing amount of Mormon scholarship "the New Mormon History". The "New Mormon History" movement included the non-Mormons Thomas F. O'Dea, P. A. M. Taylor, Mario De Pillis, Lawrence Foster, the Community of Christ member Robert Flanders, and the Mormon scholar Kalus Hansen.

Maureen Ursenbach Beecher was a leading researcher in women's studies. In the 1970s women's biographies were published, but not integrated into larger narratives. Other women hired by the Church Historical Department included Jill Mulvay Derr, Carol Cornwall Madsen, and Edyth Romney. Journals dedicated special issues to Mormon women, and the increased interest in Mormon women led to more publications focused on them. Scholars published biographies of Emma Smith, Eliza Snow, Emmeline B. Wells, and Amy Brown Lyman.

Some writers looked at Mormon women's history with the goal of restructuring historical narratives. Mormon feminist articles on Mormon history started with the special Summer 1971 issue of Dialogue on women's issues and continued in publications like Exponent II (starting in 1974), and Mormon Sisters: Women in Early Utah (1976), edited by Claudia Bushman. Beecher and Laurel Thatcher Ulrich edited another volume about Mormon women's history in Sisters in Sprit: Mormon Women in Historical and Cultural Perspective (1987). Women and Authority: Re-emerging Mormon Feminism (1992) was another milestone in feminist publications, and it encouraged Mormon women to be empowered by their history and "reclaim lost opportunities."

Most new Mormon historians were LDS. Their audience was Mormon intellectuals and non-Mormons. They maintained their respect for the Mormon faith, admitted to flaws in people and policies, and avoided taking a defensive stance, a tone which non-Mormon historian Jan Shipps wrote "made them seem more secular than they actually were." Mormon history by non-Mormons at this time had a similar detached tone. New Mormon historians often published with the University of Illinois Press in order to publish for an academic audience independent of the church. Charles S. Peterson argued in The Great Basin Kingdom Revisited that Arrington took an exceptionalist view of Mormon history, which he then taught to other New Mormon historians. This exceptionalist view was that they could believe in both secular history and orthodox Mormon views of the restoration.

== New History ==
New Mormon history is but a reflection of the change in writing history overall that took root in the 20th century. Quinn states that "the New Mormon History includes all of the ingredients of 'new history' in America at large but has one crucial addition: the effort to avoid using history as a religious battering ram."

The new historical movement's inclusive definition of the proper matter of historical study has also given it the label total history. The movement was contrasted with the traditional ways of writing history which particularly characterized the 19th century, resisting their focus on politics and "great men"; their insistence on composing historical narrative; their emphasis on administrative documents as key source materials; their concern with individuals' motivations and intentions as explanatory factors for historical events; and their willingness to accept the possibility of historians' objectivity.

== Differences from traditional Mormon history ==
Quinn, referring to Brooks' history of the Mountain Meadows massacre, states that new Mormon history began with her in that she "avoided seven deadly sins of traditional Mormon history." Quinn identifies these "sins" as:

- "Shrink[ing] from analyzing a controversial topic"
- "Conceal[ing] [a] sensitive or contradictory" interpretation
- "Hesitat[ing] to follow the evidence to 'revisionist' interpretations that [run] counter to 'traditional' assumptions"
- "Us[ing] [one's] evidence to insult the religious beliefs of Mormons"
- "Disappoint[ing] the scholarly expectations of academics"
- "Cater[ing] to public relations preferences"
- "Us[ing] an 'academic' work to proselytize for religious conversion or defection"

== See also ==
- Thomas G. Alexander
- Davis Bitton
- Mormon studies
- Mormonism and history
