= John Whitmer Historical Association =

US organization

- Abbreviation: JWHA
- Formation: September 18, 1972; 54 years ago
- Legal status: nonprofit
- Field: Mormon history
- Members: around 400
- President: Matt Harris (2025-2026)
- Journal Editor: Ken Mulliken
- Executive Director: Cheryle Grinter
- Main organ: John Whitmer Historical Association Journal (1981-)
- Subsidiaries: John Whitmer Books
- Affiliations: Mormon History Association
- Website: jwha.info

The John Whitmer Historical Association (JWHA) is an independent, nonprofit organization promoting study, research, and publishing about the history and culture of the Latter Day Saint movement. It is especially focused on the Community of Christ (formerly known as the Reorganized Church of Jesus Christ of Latter Day Saints, or RLDS Church), other midwestern Restoration traditions, and early Mormonism. The Community of Christ's approach to its own history was influenced, in part, by historical problems raised and explored through JWHA publications and conferences, and those of its sister organization, the Mormon History Association. JWHA membership numbers around 400 and is open to all, fostering cooperation with LDS and non-Mormon scholars.

== History ==
=== Background ===
Before the founding of the JWHA, scholarship in the field of Mormon history had been developing. In the 1950s, scholars like Fawn Brodie, Juanita Brooks, Thomas O'Dea, and Leonard Arrington began applying academic methods to their religious history, giving rise to the New Mormon History. In this spirit, Robert Flanders, a professor at the RLDS-affiliated Graceland College, published Nauvoo: Kingdom on the Mississippi in 1965. The book presented controversies, like Joseph Smith's polygamy, that were in contrast to faith-promoting teachings of the RLDS Church, and brought a backlash from some RLDS members. Then Richard P. Howard, another proponent of the New Mormon History, was appointed Church Historian in 1966, further upsetting some traditional believers. Howard opened the church archives and was optimistic about historical challenges.

This progressive approach to Mormon studies inspired Courage: A Journal of History, Thought and Action, founded in 1970 by several faculty from Graceland College. Contrasting with conservative RLDS publishing, Courage ventured a fresh look at RLDS issues and historical problems, often diverging from traditional interpretations. The independent journal closed in 1973, by which time several of its team had started the JWHA.

Throughout this time, Mormon historical scholarship was developing within The Church of Jesus Christ of Latter-day Saints (LDS Church) in Utah. In 1965 the Mormon History Association was founded, which included RLDS historians amongst its officers. The periodicals BYU Studies (started 1959) and Dialogue: A Journal of Mormon Thought (started 1966) published articles from MHA members. MHA founder Leonard Arrington was appointed LDS Church Historian in 1972, forming a new Church Historical Department which was active in the historical community.

=== Founding ===
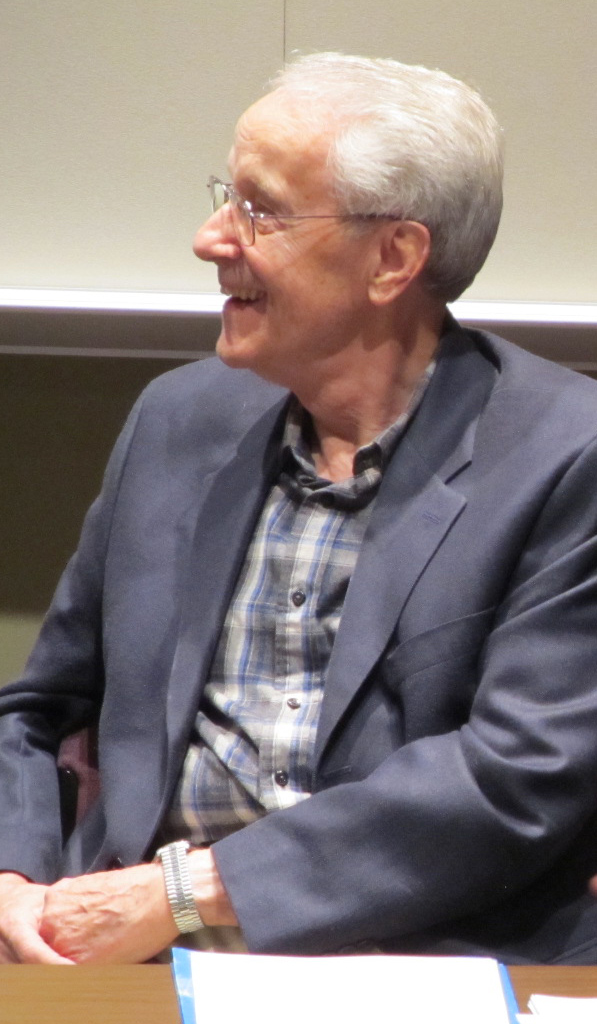
Richard P. Howard was RLDS Church Historian when the JWHA was founded at a gathering in his home, and served as JWHA president in 1985.

Despite positive experiences, RLDS historians in the midwest found MHA participation difficult due to the distance to Utah. So on September 18, 1972, fifteen like-minded RLDS historians met together in Independence, Missouri, in the living room of Richard P. Howard, the official historian of the RLDS Church, and organized the John Whitmer Historical Association. Some had organizational expertise from their service as MHA officers.

Most of these were already members of the MHA, and the JWHA was founded with the intent to continue the collaboration and warm relations with the MHA. Richard Howard won an MHA award in 1970 and was interested in exchanging ideas between LDS and RLDS scholars. From its beginning the JWHA board of directors included LDS members, and Utah historians were invited to join. The first JWHA meeting was held in September 1973 in Nauvoo, Illinois.

=== Impact on the church ===
Founded as an independent group, not under the direction of any church, the JWHA would be free to explore historical controversies. Participants supported the New Mormon History, cultivating a lively tradition of exploring controversy in Mormonism. Some traditionalists and religious leaders warned that this approach could damage faith, while questioning and liberal Latter Day Saints found community and intellectual freedom. As John Whitmer, the first Church Historian in 1831, was remembered for his controversial history of early Mormonism and falling out with church leaders, the name evoked taking the side of the historian when in conflict with the institution.

Through the JWHA, RLDS members confronted Joseph Smith's historical link with Mormon polygamy, a defining issue for the RLDS Church. Church leaders worried that publications in the 1960s and 1970s, including Flanders's book, might trouble church members after more than a century of official RLDS insistence that Smith was never involved. On direction from President Wallace B. Smith, Howard undertook a five-year study which was then edited and softened by RLDS leaders and historians in 1982. The First Presidency recommended it be presented at the JWHA, and later in the John Whitmer Historical Association Journal. But after some blowback the First Presidency denied involvement, saying the JWHA Journal did not speak for the church. Jan Shipps commented that "faith seemed endangered and help and comfort were needed".

This became one of the "Church-shaking changes" that transformed the RLDS Church in the 1980s and 1990s, alongside the ordination of women, the new temple in Independence, and the break with father-son succession of the presidency. The church moved from its Mormon heritage toward liberal Protestantism, adopting the name Community of Christ in 2001.

W. Grant McMurray, church president from 1996 to 2004, demonstrates the influence of the JWHA on the Community of Christ. Working for the church as a researcher and later as the archivist, McMurray advanced into church leadership. During this time McMurray joined other RLDS supporters of the New Mormon History to found the JWHA, serving as its president in 1981. He continued to present and publish influential articles, while also serving in high church offices. As church president, he presented a paper to the JWHA in 1999, as a response to an earlier critique of the RLDS Church, where he stated that his past historical research had influenced the positions he took as church president. In 2006, after resigning the presidency, McMurray was able to speak frankly about Joseph Smith's polygamy at the JWHA, which had so troubled the church in the 1970s and 1980s.

== Academic community ==
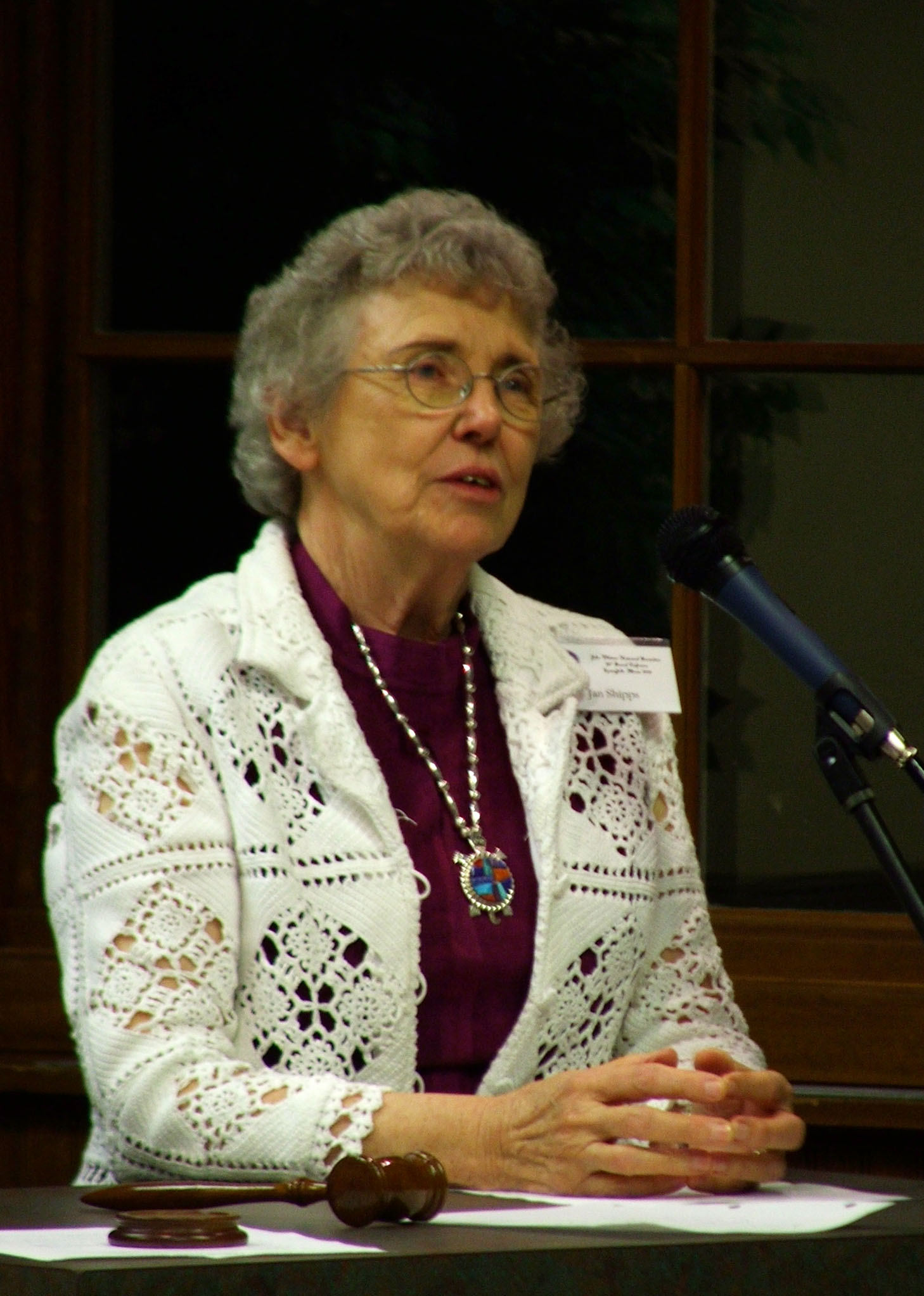
Jan Shipps, a non-Mormon, delivered the first paper to a JWHA conference and served as JWHA president in 2004-05.

The JWHA is considered an important professional venue within the Latter Day Saint historical community. Historians from different backgrounds connect and share research, and develop scholarship. JWHA is often a venue for research which is later published in book form by a scholarly press. For example, Jan Shipps, a non-Mormon scholar, opened the first JWHA conference in 1973 with a paper entitled "The Prophet Puzzle", which was then picked up the next year by the Mormon History Association as the head article in the inaugural issue of the Journal of Mormon History. Years later the paper was again highlighted in the Essays on Mormonism Series published by Signature Books. In another example from the 1973 JWHA conference, Lawrence Foster, another non-Mormon, shared his research on polygamy with LDS Assistant Church Historian Davis Bitton. Bitton invited Foster to the LDS archives in Salt Lake City, Utah, leading to Foster's first published book.

Since its founding, the JWHA has worked closely with its "sister organization", the Utah-based Mormon History Association. The two organizations have held a joint conference and have long offered joint memberships. Many MHA members are also JWHA members, or also members of the Utah State Historical Society, all three of which Jan Shipps called "Mormon to the core". Several presidents of the MHA have also been presidents of the JWHA, as well as one BYU religion professor. In addition to the MHA, the JWHA has also co-sponsored conferences with the Sunstone Educational Foundation and collaborated with the Mormon Missouri Frontier Foundation, including an archaeological dig at Hawn's Mill in 2002.

The JWHA and MHA fostered an interfaith dialogue that helped thaw relations between the LDS and RLDS. Each organization published research and reviewed books by members of both faiths. This complimented the trust developed in the 1960s between Richard Howard, the RLDS Church Historian, and Robert Matthews, an LDS researcher of Joseph Smith's Bible translation manuscript, held in the RLDS collections. From this goodwill, the RLDS Church approved Matthews' research for publication in the official LDS Edition of the Bible in 1979.

While it is most often compared to the MHA, the role of the JWHA has also been compared to other organizations within the historical community. This includes the Sunstone Education Foundation, the Dialogue Foundation, Signature Books, the Utah State Historical Society (and other Utah history groups), the LDS Church History Department, and Brigham Young University institutions like the Joseph Fielding Smith Institute, the Charles Redd Center, the Religious Studies Center, and the BYU history department. Also compared are societies beyond Mormon studies, such as the American Historical Association, the American Academy of Religion, the Western History Association, and the Communal Studies Association.

== JWHA Journal ==
The JWHA began publishing the John Whitmer Historical Association Journal (JWHA Journal) in 1981. It followed several Mormon studies journals founded in the 1960s and 1970s, including Courage and Restoration Studies by RLDS scholars. The Journal of Mormon History already provided a venue for historians, but there was room for another history journal in the wake of the New Mormon History and a proliferation of scholarly writing in the 1970s.

For many years the JWHA Journal was published annually in October (but is now semiannual) with scholarly papers, book reviews, and other features. It often contains papers from the JWHA conferences, and sometimes articles are later reprinted in Restoration Studies for a more general audience. Subscriptions are included with all JWHA memberships.

While maintaining a special focus on Community of Christ history, the Journal publishes on all areas of Mormon history, drawing interest from LDS historians. Although founded by Community of Christ scholars, a significant proportion of the articles and reviews are written by LDS or non-Mormon contributors.

The JWHA Journal is peer-reviewed with a reputation for strong scholarship and as a major publication in its field. It is compared to Mormon studies journals, like Dialogue: A Journal of Mormon Thought, the Journal of Mormon History, Sunstone, BYU Studies, the Utah Historical Quarterly, Exponent II and the RLDS journals Courage: A Journal of History, Thought and Action and Restoration Studies. Also compared are non-Mormon journals, like the Journal of the Early Republic, the Illinois Historical Journal, and Church History.

== Conferences ==
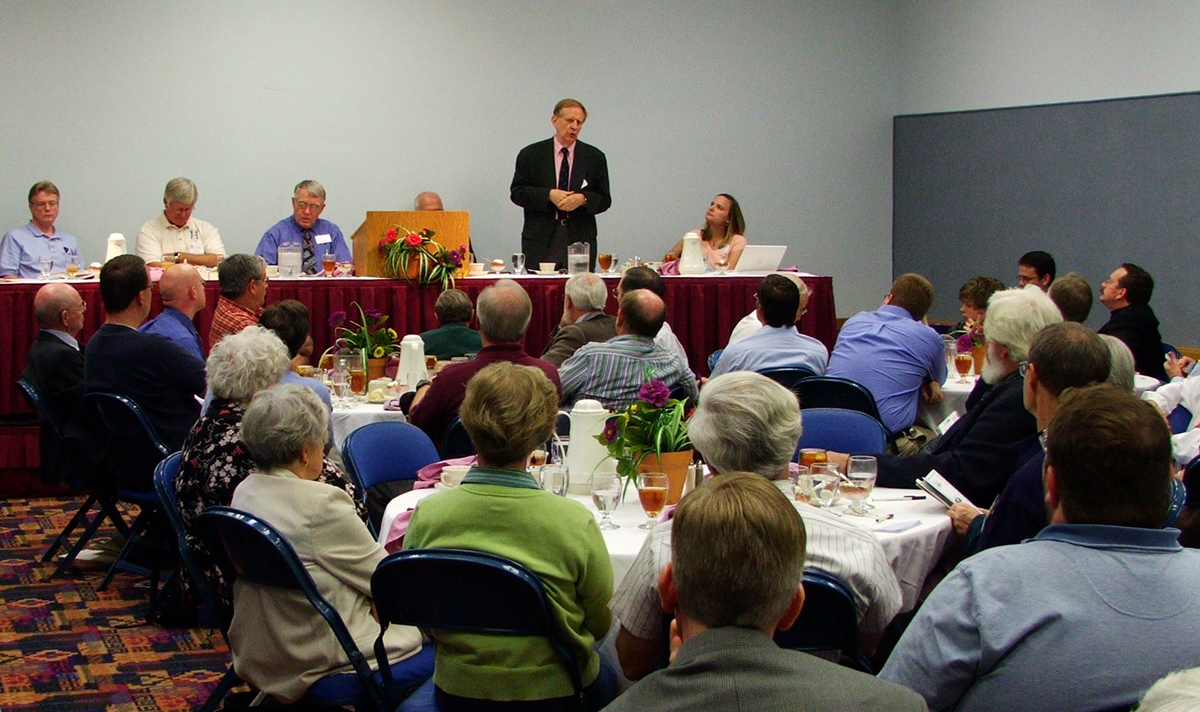
Richard Bushman speaks to the JWHA meeting in Springfield, Illinois in 2011.

The JWHA holds its annual meeting at a different historic site within Mormon history, on the last full weekend in September. Professional and independent historians from the Community of Christ, and elsewhere, present their research to an attendance of around 100. Scholars are introduced to each other and to new research. As many attendees are believers at different levels of faith, Jan Shipps observed that JWHA and MHA conferences can sometimes serve as quasi-religious support groups when faith is challenged by history, with non-LDS providing a neutral space.

== Activities ==
Aside from the annual meeting and Journal, the JWHA is involved in several other activities. Scholarships are offered to students working on Mormon history, allowing them to attend and present to the conference. Awards are also presented by the JWHA for best books and articles in Mormon history. These are found alongside other awards in Mormon studies, such as those from the MHA and the Utah State Historical Society, the Dialogue Foundation, and the Evans Biography Award.

The JWHA hosts a scholarly lecture at its Spring Banquet, held in Independence, Missouri, before each triennial World Conference of the Community of Christ, during a time when church members and leaders are gathered to the city.

In 2005, the JWHA founded John Whitmer Books, a publishing imprint for scholarly titles in Mormon Studies. The JWHA also publishes a newsletter irregularly (intended to be quarterly), which started in 1979, and has been joint publisher of Restoration Studies since 2009.

== See also ==
- Mormon History Association
- New Mormon history
- Mormon studies
- Graceland University
