= Jan Shipps =

American historian of Mormonism (1929–2025)

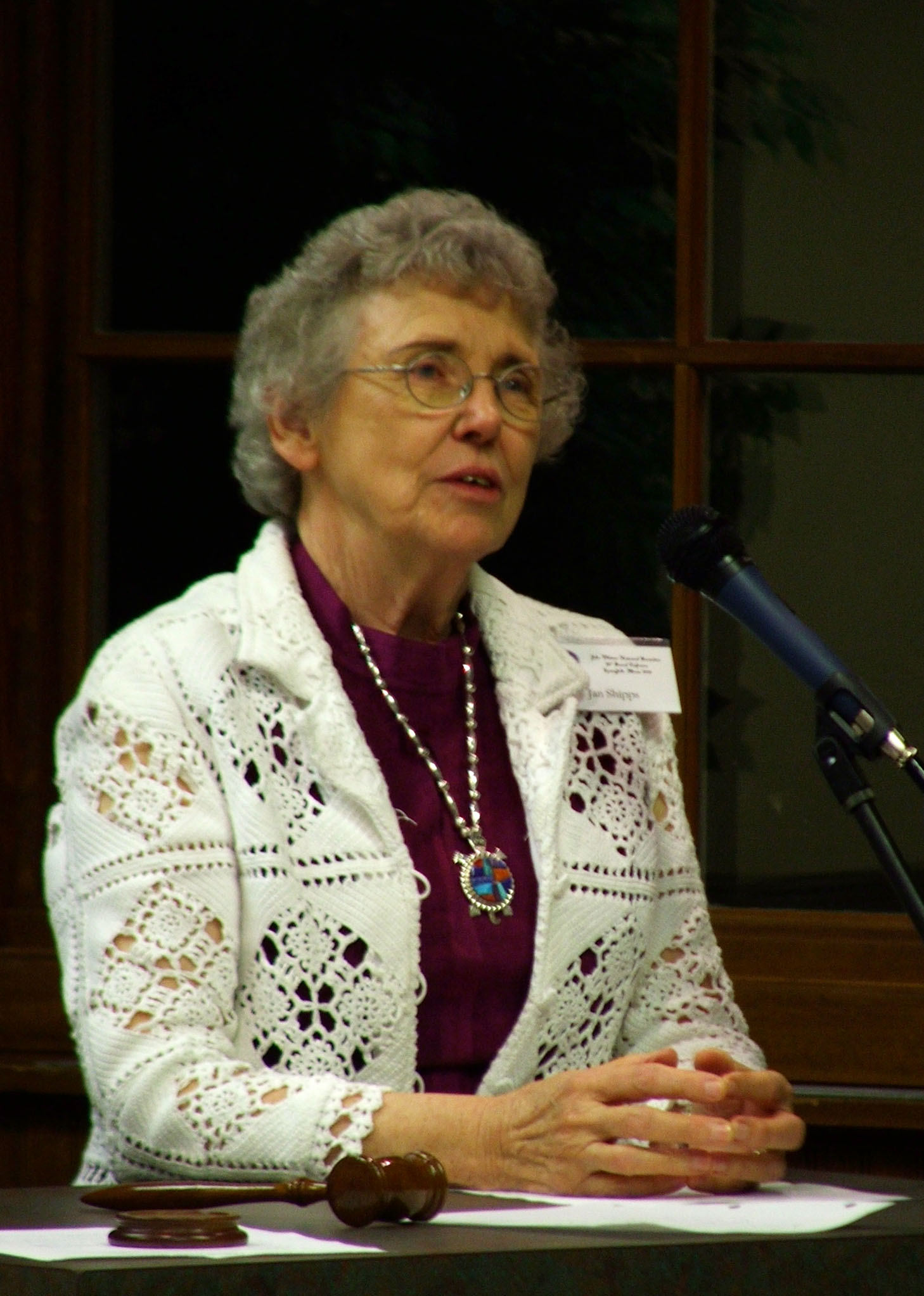
- Shipps speaking in 2003
- Born: Jo Ann Barnett; October 24, 1929
- Died: April 14, 2025 (aged 95)

Academic background
- Education: Utah State University; University of Colorado Boulder
- Thesis: The Mormons in Politics (1965)

Academic work
- Discipline: History; religious studies
- Sub-discipline: History of the Latter Day Saint movement
- School or tradition: New Mormon history
- Institutions: IUPUI

Jo Ann Barnett Shipps (October 24, 1929 – April 14, 2025), known as Jan Shipps, was an American historian specializing in Mormon history, particularly in the latter half of the 20th century and into the 21st century. Shipps was generally regarded as the foremost non-Mormon scholar of the Latter Day Saint movement, having given particular attention to the Church of Jesus Christ of Latter-day Saints (LDS Church). Her first book on the subject was Mormonism: The Story of a New Religious Tradition published by the University of Illinois Press. In 2000, the University of Illinois Press published her book Sojourner in the Promised Land: Forty Years Among the Mormons, in which she interweaves her own history of Mormon-watching with 16 essays on Mormon history and culture.

== Career as a scholar ==
Shipps had a PhD in history. She taught at Indiana University–Purdue University Indianapolis for many years and was until her death professor emeritus of history and religious studies. Her interest in Mormonism was sparked when she lived briefly with her young family in Logan, Utah in 1960–61, graduating from Utah State University in 1961. She earned her PhD degree at University of Colorado Boulder in 1965, with a dissertation on The Mormons in Politics: The First Hundred Years. She worked at the Kinsey Institute at Indiana University, formerly the Kinsey Institute for Research in Sex, Gender and Reproduction, for a time in the early 1970s before returning to her studies of Mormonism.

A lifelong practicing Methodist, Shipps was widely respected in Mormon historical circles, as well as secular historical circles, for her ability to understand Mormonism on its own terms while maintaining sufficient distance as an outsider. Shipps served as a senior editor of The Journals of William McLellin, 1831–1836, the earliest extended account of the Mormon experience. She was the first non-Mormon and the first woman elected president of the Mormon History Association (MHA). Her articles about the Latter Day Saints have been published in a number of both academic and popular journals, and she spoke frequently about Mormonism to both Mormon and non-Mormon audiences.

=== Theories and arguments ===
Shipps studied how perceptions of Mormons have changed over time and the process by which Latter Day Saints have gained a sense of distinctive self-identity. She established academic standards for the use of the terms Latter Day Saint, Latter-day Saint, and Mormon for the various churches and movements that trace their origins back to Joseph Smith. Her scholarship brought attention to the "doughnut syndrome"; (Note: See also: Symbolic annihilation.) cases where histories of the Western United States ignore or give superficial treatment to the history of Utah territory, Mormonism and Mormon colonization. This syndrome, Shipps argued, may be due to the fact that Utah and Mormon history is dramatically different from the settlement of the rest of the West. While Western history usually emphasizes the individualistic, universalistic nature of early Western US society, the settlement of the Utah Territory was characterized by ordered and communal societies.

=== Later contributions ===
In her 2000 book Sojourner in the Promised Land: Forty Years Among the Mormons, Shipps documents what she calls, "the gathering of the scattered and the scattering of the gathering." Shipps details how the LDS Church changed its central gathering point from Utah to local stakes anywhere in the world as spiritual, cultural and physical gathering points.

Since retiring from being a professor, Shipps continued to write about Latter Day Saint history and consulted journalists about news on the movement. In 2005, she gave a paper on the LDS Church at a global religion at a conference commemorating Smith, founder of the Latter Day Saint movement, held at the Library of Congress. She also keynoted an April 2007 conference in Arkansas honoring early apostle Parley P. Pratt. The conference marked the sesquicentennial of Pratt's 1857 murder and the bicentennial of his birth.

== Scholarly associations ==
Shipps was long an avid promoter of scholarly associations. She served as president of the MHA (1979–80), the John Whitmer Historical Association (2004–05), and the American Society of Church History (2006).

== Death ==
Shipps died on April 14, 2025, at the age of 95.

== Publications ==
As author:

- Mormonism: The Story of a New Religious Tradition. 1987. ISBN 0-252-01417-0
- Sojourner in the Promised Land: Forty Years among the Mormons. 2000. ISBN 0-252-02590-3 – collected essays

As editor:

- with Welch, John W. The Journal of William E. McLellin, 1831–1836. 1994.
- with Silk, Mark. Religion and Public Life in the Mountain West: Sacred Landscapes in Transition (Religion by Region Series, #2). 2004. ISBN 0-7591-0626-6

Collections:

- Howard R. Lamar, Richard L. Bushman, Donald Worster, Jan Shipps. Collected Leonard J. Arrington Mormon History Lectures. Merrill Library, 2004.
- Gerald D. Nash, Eugene England, Dean L. May, Jan Shipps, James B. Allen. Twentieth Century American West: Contributions to an Understanding. 1994.

== Notes ==
Professional and academic associations
Preceded by Milton V. Backman	President of the Mormon History Association; 1979–1980	Succeeded by Dean C. Jessee
Preceded by Mark Noll	President of the American; Society of Church History; 2006–2007	Succeeded by John Van Engen
