= Nothing Very Important and Other Stories =

Stories about Mormon missionaries

- Author: Béla Petsco
- Language: English
- Genre: Short story collection
- Set in: Southern California
- Publisher: self-published, Signature Books
- Publication date: 1979; 1984
- ISBN: 0911712607

Nothing Very Important and Other Stories is a collection of interconnected short stories written by Béla Petsco and self-published in 1979 with illustrations by his friend Kathryn Clark-Spencer. The stories are about missionaries from the Church of Jesus Christ of Latter-day Saints (LDS Church) working in Southern California. Signature Books reprinted the book in 1984 under their Orion imprint. Petsco wrote the stories for his master's thesis at Brigham Young University (BYU). The book won the 1979 Association for Mormon Letters award for short fiction. The stories were adapted for theater and performed in 1983, but without BYU's endorsement.

Critical reception of the book was mostly positive, and the work was hailed as an important work by and about a Latter-day Saint written by someone raised outside the Wasatch Front. Reviewers remarked that the book used realism to show a truthful but sometimes painful picture of Mormonism.

== Plot ==
The stories are centered around LDS missionaries in the Southern California mission in the late 1970s, with Mihaly Agyar being a central character.

== Background ==
Richard Cracroft, an English professor at BYU, encouraged Petsco to study English and to write a creative thesis in the English master's program at BYU. Petsco cited David Evans as a major influence. Petsco wrote Nothing Very Important for his 1977 MA thesis. Initially, Petsco could not find a publisher for Nothing Very Important and self-published it in 1979. The book was sold in Deseret Book in 1979. Signature Books re-published it in 1984 under their Orion imprint. Petsco taught composition at BYU as an adjunct professor after graduating with his MA in 1977. His friend, Kathryn Clark-Spencer, did the artwork for the book.

== Theatrical production ==
A student club called the Hyde Park Club produced a play based on the book in November 1983. Dennis Clark and Harlow Clark led the group. Petsco was pleased with the adaptation, calling it "remarkably fine." BYU Student newspaper The Daily Universe refused to advertise for the play; they explained to student director David Cameron that administrators didn't want the production to appear that it had the university's endorsement. The play was also performed at the Orem Public Library. Writing to the editor at The Daily Herald, A. J. Nielson believed that the production had "universal appeal" and that the acting in the production was good.

== Reception ==
=== Letter from Dallin H. Oaks ===
Dallin H. Oaks, then-president of BYU, wrote a letter to Ezra Taft Benson, then the President of the Quorum of the Twelve Apostles (LDS Church). The letter is quoted in Bergera's and Priddis's Brigham Young University: A House of Faith. In it, Oaks said that Nothing Very Important "does not strengthen [Petsco's] efforts for employment at BYU". Petsco's adjunct contract was not renewed in 1983. Petsco's health declined and he stopped writing fiction after this time.

=== Critical reception ===
Lavina Fielding Anderson described it as part of a movement in the 1960s and 1970s where Mormon authors writing literary fiction "occupied an uncomfortable no-man's land." The collection of linked stories won the 1979 Association for Mormon Letters award for short fiction. The award citation stated that it marked a milestone in Mormon literature, as "an important modern fictional work by and about a Latter-day Saint reared outside of the Wasatch-front cultural tradition." The stories were based on events from Petsco's life as a missionary in Southern California.

Reviews at the time acknowledged the book's limitations while praising its unique voice. Writing for the Association for Mormon Letters newsletter, Elouise Bell gave the book a favorable review. "It is when the realism of the human animal encounters the idealism of the Mormon soul that the author's best stories result." She wrote that while Petsco's writing was "smooth, professional, and highly readable" that he had not yet mastered the genre of the self-contained short story. At Sunstone, Elizabeth Shaw wrote that the book did not explore moral dilemmas as thoroughly as other missionary fiction. However, Shaw wrote that "the mood that emerges from Petsco's understated, almost off-hand prose allows me to face--without guilt--the cultural vagaries I assume by virtue of my membership in The Church of Jesus Christ of Latter-day Saints. And that's a major accomplishment." She summarized the work as "quick and clear and complex and renewing". Michael Olsen at The Payson Chronicle wrote that the book was "one of the most truthful but sometimes painfully objective pictures of Mormonism yet to come from the point of view of a true believer."

In a 2002 review for the AML blog, William Morris wrote that the stories seemed innocent, and deserve readers who "will interact intensely with the text, yet at the end, not draw any conclusions or insist on interpretation".

=== Mentions in works about Mormon fiction ===
In his essay "The Dawning of a Brighter Day: Mormon Literature after 150 Years", Eugene England mentioned Nothing Very Important in connection with emerging good books in Mormon literature. In his introduction to Bright Angels and Familiars, England said that Nothing Very Important was, like Bread and Milk (1979) and Elders and Sisters (1977), a series of stories connected by a longer narrative. Bruce Jorgensen mentioned Nothing Very Important as "the first entirely non-Utah-Idaho Mormon fiction" in the Encyclopedia of Mormonism. Marilyn Brown referred to Bela Petsco as one of the best Mormon short story writers and noted his absence in the anthology Greening Wheat. In a summary of local fiction for The Daily Herald, Richard Cracroft mentioned Nothing Very Important along with Cory Davidson as recent "regional best-sellers in a literary genre" about missionary life. Cracroft also mentioned Petsco's book in a 1981 Ensign article in a section on current Mormon fiction, comparing it to Winesburg, Ohio by Sherwood Anderson.
