= Corianton =

Corianton may refer to:

- Corianton, Alma the younger's son from the Book of Mormon
- Corianton: A Story of Unholy Love (1931), a Mormon film inspired by the story of Corianton from the Book of Mormon
- Corianton, a novel by B. H. Roberts inspired by the Book of Mormon story
