= Hagoth =

Nephite shipbuilder in the Book of Mormon

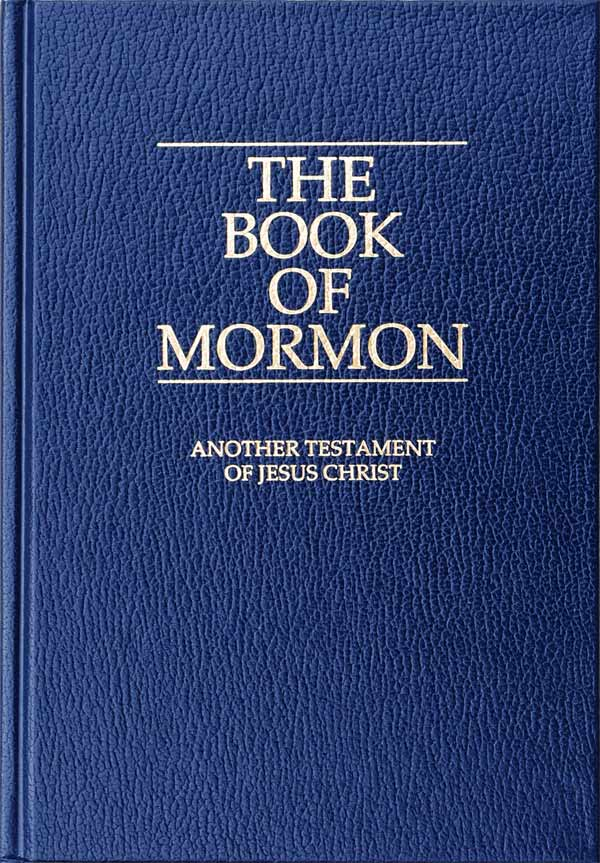
The Book of Mormon, one of the members of the Church of Jesus Christ of Latter-day Saints' scriptures, also serves as the source of the reference to Hagoth.

Hagoth (/ˈheɪ.ɡɑːθ/ (Note: IPA-ified from "hā´gäth")) (Deseret: 𐐐𐐁𐐘𐐉𐐛), in the beliefs of the members of the Church of Jesus Christ of Latter Day Saints (Mormons) was a Nephite shipbuilder who lived in the mid-1st century BC. He is primarily known for his role in maritime expeditions to the north. Hagoth holds a prominent place in the Church of Jesus Christ of Latter-day Saints' theology, especially in the context of the church's connections with Polynesians. His figure also appears in the studies of scholars, some of the faith, who seek to prove the authenticity of the Book of Mormon.

== Pronunciation of the name ==
The pronunciation of this name has sparked some interest among members of the Church of Jesus Christ of Latter-day Saints' scholars, especially historians focused on the history of the Church. It has been included in a pronunciation guide attached to each copy of the English version of the Book of Mormon since 1981. Sources generally indicate a significant difference between the preferred and commonly used contemporary pronunciation and that from the early period of Utah's colonization for many names and terms from the Book of Mormon. However, there is no such difference in the case of the name Hagoth.

The original pronunciation, especially that used by Joseph Smith, holds some importance in studies of the proper names found in the Book of Mormon, though within Mormon theology, it is not a decisive factor. To determine the pronunciation used by Smith, researchers sometimes refer to the 1869 edition of the Book of Mormon in the Deseret alphabet, which is a writing system created between 1847 and 1854 in Utah at the request of church leaders, including Brigham Young.

There are records from individuals involved in what Latter Day Saints call the translation of the Book of Mormon that shed light on how Smith originally handled unfamiliar words. Hugh Nibley, citing reports from Smith's scribes, stated that he never pronounced such words, always resorting to spelling them out. In Mormon theology, there is no particular effort to determine the original pronunciation of this word, nor of Nephite words and names in general.

Within the Church of Jesus Christ of Latter-day Saints theology, there is also an acknowledgment of the inherent difficulty in pronouncing names and terms found in this sacred Mormon text. This difficulty arises from the fact that none of these names were conveyed to Joseph Smith orally. The only likely exception is the name Moroni, who is said to have introduced himself to Smith in a vision in 1823. From a doctrinal standpoint, the way the characters in the Book of Mormon pronounced these words remained unknown to the first Mormon leader.

== In the Book of Mormon ==
Information about the life and activities of this Nephite shipbuilder comes from the Book of Mormon. References to him are found in the 63rd chapter of the Book of Alma, which is part of the Mormon canon of scriptures. Hagoth is credited with the construction of several ships, at least two of which disappeared or sank with their crew and passengers. Described as a man driven by an exceedingly great curiosity, he also initiated the building of a large ship, which played a key role in a Nephite maritime expedition to the north. This expedition, interpreted as a colonizing or settlement effort, is said to have occurred in 55 BC. It is considered successful, as the Book of Mormon mentions a subsequent journey north in either 54 or 53 BC. The migrations involving Hagoth are analyzed in the context of the demographic changes in the land of Zarahemla that followed the end of a series of Nephite-Lamanite wars.

The Book of Mormon does not provide many additional details about Hagoth. It only mentions the area in which he operated, primarily at the border of the land Bountiful, near the land Desolation. Some commentators point out that, contrary to Mormon tradition, the original text does not suggest that Hagoth himself sailed on any of the ships mentioned, nor does it provide any specific destination for these voyages.

== In Mormon theology ==
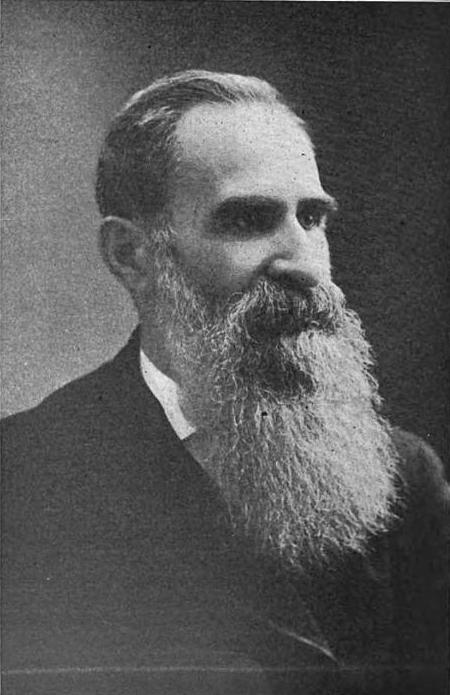
George Reynolds, one of the pioneers of Book of Mormon studies, was likely the first person to link the Polynesians with Hagoth.

Hagoth and the maritime expeditions associated with him hold a prominent place in Mormon theological thought, sparking continuous curiosity for over 150 years. Although The Church of Jesus Christ of Latter-day Saints does not have an official position on the matter, some Polynesians consider themselves descended from the peoples described in the Book of Mormon, including participants in Hagoth's Nephite voyages. This belief explains the early interest Mormon leaders showed in the Pacific, which was present in the church's activities from its beginnings. The first to mention this connection was George Q. Cannon during his missionary work in Hawaii (1851). The belief quickly spread among church leadership, with Brigham Young teaching in 1858 that the native islanders belonged to the House of Israel, a sentiment he repeated in a letter to Hawaiian King Kamehameha V in 1865. The first link between Polynesians and the Book of Mormon through Hagoth likely comes from a series of articles by George Reynolds, titled Man and His Varieties, published in 1868.

However, precisely situating Hagoth within Mormon theology can be challenging, as he is also a subject of discussion among church leaders and early missionaries. George Q. Cannon reportedly experienced a vision in which native Hawaiians were recognized as a Lamanite tribe. This vision attained canonical status in 1937. The topic was addressed in a letter to the president of the Samoan mission on 6 September 1972 by N. Eldon Tanner and Marion G. Romney, who were then serving as counselors in the First Presidency. They approached it briefly and cautiously, noting in their letter, "You ask who the Polynesians are – whether they are Nephites or Lamanites. This matter has been the subject of much speculation in the past. However, we have no evidence from the scriptures or revelations where the Lord has spoken of where these people came from or their ancestry". Nonetheless, Spencer W. Kimball confirmed the Lamanite identity of at least part of the Polynesians as early as 1975.

Matthew Cowley repeatedly emphasized that Polynesians had Nephite blood. A journal entry from Louisa Pratt in October 1851 also mentions that the Nephites were the ancient fathers of the Tahitians. The ethnic affiliation of Polynesians within Mormon beliefs remains uncertain, particularly considering Hagoth's clearly Nephite origins. Contemporary church leadership speaks cautiously about Hagoth and the origins of Polynesians.

The relationship of various groups of believers to their Hagoth-derived lineage is complex. Some have identified with Hagoth without any missionary influence. From the outset of their interaction with Christianity, the Maori held a belief that they were connected to ancient Israelites. In the Book of Mormon, with its brief mention of maritime journeys by a prominent seafarer, they found validation for these desires. Maori Latter Day Saints generally see themselves as being of Nephite descent, though they occasionally associate with Lamanites, but only in the context of specific sins, not ethnic affiliation. Regardless of the debates surrounding Hagoth, he remains an important figure in Polynesian religious tradition, passed down and maintained through generations.

Matthew Cowley is likely responsible for popularizing the belief in Hagoth’s Polynesian connections. Known for his theological creativity and love of Maori culture and language, this view has been reflected in statements by various church presidents over the decades. For instance, David O. McKay, in his prayer dedicating the Mormon temple in Hamilton, New Zealand, in 1958, referred to the Maori as descendants of Father Lehi. In 1976, during a speech to the Samoan Latter Day Saints, Spencer W. Kimball mentioned that it seemed clear that their ancestors had set sail northward, eventually settling in the South Pacific. The connection between Polynesians and the peoples of the Book of Mormon is also reinforced by the patriarchal blessings given to church members in Polynesia.

Although the Polynesian direction of Hagoth's voyages is deeply rooted in Mormon tradition and theology, it is not the only possibility discussed. In the early 20th century, several church leaders involved in missionary work in Japan suggested that Hagoth may have reached Japan’s shores. However, this view did not gain traction after the mission saw limited success in Japan, though some later Mormon publications have mentioned Hagoth in connection with the origins of the Japanese people.

Advocates of locating the lands and events described in the Book of Mormon exclusively in the US-Canadian border region suggest that Hagoth's voyages were bound for the Great Lakes. Critics argue that this narrow view undermines the religious identity of Latter Day Saints from Pacific nations and can be interpreted as a reflection of American exceptionalism.

External analyses of Hagoth and this aspect of Mormon theology sometimes highlight its complex relationship with racial views, particularly those expressed by some early church leaders and missionaries. However, this issue has not escaped the attention of some Latter Day Saint scholars. Mormonism's tendency to place encountered communities within the context of its scriptures, as seen in the case of Hagoth, was especially appealing to indigenous peoples in colonial contexts.

== In Mormon art and literature ==
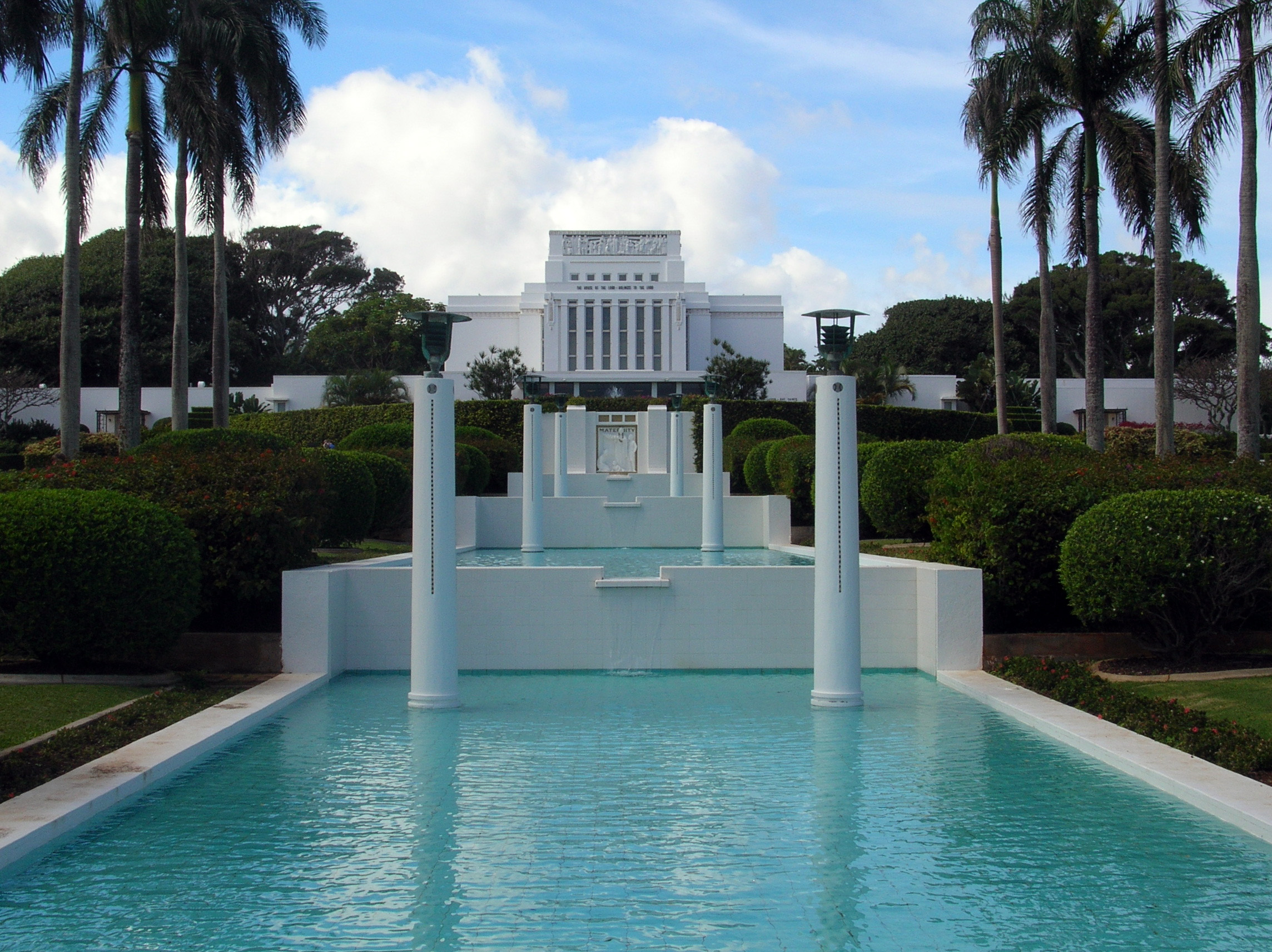
Mormon temple in Lāʻie, Hawaii. This building is adorned with bas-reliefs, including a bas-relief depicting Hagoth.

The existence of Hagoth and the hypotheses associated with him have not been confirmed by external sources. According to the overwhelming majority of researchers, the inhabitants of Polynesia most likely originate from Southeast Asia. However, historical contacts between the indigenous peoples of the Americas and the Pacific region are not entirely ruled out. Regardless of scholarly debates or Hagoth's theological placement, he remains an integral part of Mormon folklore. A board game has even been produced in his honor, and there is a blog named after him dedicated to the literary life of Latter Day Saints. Hagoth is often depicted as a hero to Polynesian Mormon youth. He has been immortalized in art, including on the bas-reliefs that adorn the Mormon temple in Lāʻie, Hawaii. These bas-reliefs, created by J. Leo Fairbanks, Avard Fairbanks, and Torlief Knaphus, depict the dispensations of the gospel recognized in Mormon theology, with Hagoth representing the Nephite dispensation. In this depiction, Hagoth stands to the right of Jesus Christ, next to a ship, holding an oar.

Hagoth or his metaphorical descendants have been the subject of several artworks, including The Ship of Hagoth (1949–1951), Taking the Stick of Joseph to the Children of Hagoth, and Hagot construye barcos by Minerva Teichert, Sylvia Huege de Serville, and Israel Trejo, respectively. The first of these works is part of the collection at the Brigham Young University Museum of Art.

Hagoth also holds a place in Mormon literature outside of the church. Julia McDonald wrote a story about him titled A Ship of Hagoth: A Tale of Ancient America (1897), which was later partially adapted by Orestes Utah Bean into a popular, though critically panned, stage play (1902) and the Broadway production An Aztec Romance (1912). Gordon Ryan also featured Hagoth in his 1998 novel Upon the Isles of the Sea: A Book of Mormon Adventure from the Nephite Chronicles.

== In broader Mormon culture ==
Outside of conventional Mormon theology and culture, Hagoth has also appeared in contexts that are difficult to classify definitively. A group calling itself the "Nemenhah State of the Federation of Royal Maya and Indigenous Traditional Organization" was founded in 2003 by Philip Landis. This group is responsible for the publication of the so-called Mentinah Papers, released in 2004. This nine-volume work, purportedly a translation of records discovered in the mountains near Manti in the 19th century, allegedly contains the chronicles of Hagoth's descendants.

The Mentinah Papers begins with the Book of Hagoth, featuring an account of the now elderly shipbuilder. Later in the narrative, Hagoth's people settle in the southwestern United States, and the settlements established by his descendants become part of the land of Mentinah, while maintaining contact with the peoples from the lands described in the Book of Mormon. According to the Mentinah Papers, Samuel the Lamanite, a prophet from the Book of Mormon, spent many months visiting Mentinah, and even Jesus Christ is said to have visited this place, paralleling His visit in the Book of Mormon and bolstering the legitimacy of these records as part of the canon. The text also introduces Hagmeni, Hagoth's son.

The Church of Jesus Christ of Latter-day Saints rejects the canonical status of the Mentinah Papers, citing doctrinal errors and the lack of necessary priesthood authority. Landis himself, apparently attempting to distance his work from Mormonism, later altered the spelling of the Nephite shipbuilder’s name in the Mentinah Papers to "Hahgohtl". However, his efforts have been analyzed in the context of how Hagoth's story has been used to provide identity to various groups, and as a natural consequence of the Mormon expectation for additional, yet-to-be-revealed scriptures.

Alongside debates about the figure of Hagoth, his name has appeared in studies of non-orthodox naming practices found in the Book of Mormon and has been used as evidence supporting the authenticity of the Mormon scripture. Mormon apologetics assert that the name Hagoth is attested in ancient Hebrew inscriptions. However, skeptics argue that Joseph Smith could have derived it from the biblical prophet Haggai. Others suggest the story of Hagoth may have been inspired by a missionary expedition to Hawaii in November 1827, during which approximately 40,000 biblical pamphlets were distributed. Smith might have heard about this and creatively reworked it into the Book of Mormon.

The voyages associated with Hagoth and the implications left by their descriptions have also been used in constructing one of the internal geographic models of the Book of Mormon. A street in Salt Lake City is even named after Hagoth.

== Bibliography ==
- Wilcox, Brad; Brown, Bruce L.; Baker-Smemoe, Wendy; Black, Sharon (2019). "Comparing Phonemic Patterns in Book of Mormon Personal Names with Fictional and Authentic Sources: An Exploratory Study" (PDF). Interpreter: A Journal of Latter-day Saint Faith and Scholarship. 33. The Interpreter Foundation. ISSN 2372-126X. Archived from the original (PDF) on 2021-06-14.
- Clement, Russell T. (1980). "Polynesian Origins: More Word on the Mormon Perspective". Dialogue: A Journal of Mormon Thought. 13 (4). Dialogue Foundation: 88–98. doi:10.2307/45224944. ISSN 1554-9399. JSTOR 45224944.
- Anderson, Paul L. (2000). "A Jewel in the Gardens of Paradise: The Art and Architecture of the Hawai'i Temple the Hawai'i Temple". Brigham Young University Studies Quarterly. 39 (4). ISSN 2167-8472.
- Shields, Steven L. (2021). Divergent Paths of the Restoration: An Encyclopedia of the Smith–Rigdon Movement. Salt Lake City: Signature Books. ISBN 978-1-56085-401-2.
- Tvedtnes, John A.; Gee, John; Roper, Matthew (2000). "Book of Mormon Names Attested in Ancient Hebrew Inscriptions". Journal of Book of Mormon Studies. 9 (1). Brigham Young University. ISSN 2168-3158.
- Clark, John E. (1989). "A Key for Evaluating Nephite Geographies". Review of Books on the Book of Mormon. 1 (1). Brigham Young University. ISSN 2168-3719.
- Woodger, Mary Jane (2000). "How the Guide to English Pronunciation of Book of Mormon Names Came About". Journal of Book of Mormon Studies. 9 (1). Brigham Young University. ISSN 2168-3158.
- Huchel, Frederick M. (2000). "The Deseret Alphabet as an Aid in Pronouncing Book of Mormon Names". Journal of Book of Mormon Studies. 9 (1). Brigham Young University. ISSN 2168-3158.
- Ludlow, Daniel H., ed. (1992). Encyclopedia of Mormonism. New York: Macmillan Publishing. ISBN 978-0-02-904040-9.
- Hyde, Paul Nolan (2015). A Comprehensive Commentary of the First Book of Nephi. Orem: Parrish Press.
- Aikau, Hokulani K. (2012). A Chosen People, a Promised Land: Mormonism and Race in Hawai'i. Minneapolis; London: University of Minnesota Press. ISBN 978-0-8166-7462-6.
