= Signature Books =

American press specializing in Utah, Mormonism, and Western Americana

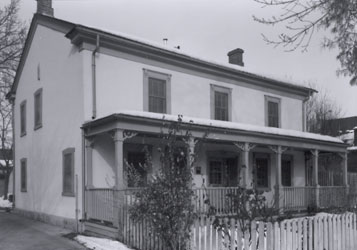
- Signature Books office
- Status: Active
- Founded: 1980
- Founder: George D. Smith and Scott G. Kenney
- Country of origin: United States of America
- Headquarters location: Salt Lake City, UT
- Distribution: Chicago Distribution Center
- Publication types: fiction, non-fiction, biography, history, documentary history, essays, poetry, women's studies
- Nonfiction topics: Mormon and Western Americana
- No. of employees: 8
- Official website: www.signaturebooks.com

Signature Books is an American press specializing in subjects related to Utah, Mormonism, and Western Americana. The company was founded in 1980 by George D. Smith and Scott Kenney and is based in Salt Lake City, Utah. It is majority owned by the Smith-Pettit Foundation.

== History ==
In the late 1970s, Scott Kenney decided there needed to be a Mormon-related press that didn't have ties to the Church of Jesus Christ of Latter-day Saints (LDS Church). Among those present at Signature Books's 1980 inception were George D. Smith and Scott Kenney, assisted by a board of directors composed of historians and business leaders: Eugene E. Campbell, Everett L. Cooley, David Lisonbee, D. Michael Quinn, Allen Dale Roberts, and Richard S. Van Wagoner; and an editorial board consisting of Lavina Fielding Anderson, Maureen Ursenbach Beecher, Davis Bitton, Orson Scott Card, and Jay Parry. In 1981 they published their first book, the satire Saintspeak by Orson Scott Card.

Several of Signature Books' publications have won awards from the Association for Mormon Letters, the John Whitmer Historical Association, the Mormon History Association, the Mountain West Center for Western Studies, and the Utah Center for the Book.

== Present ==
Signature Books produces from eight to ten books a year, which deal with topics of western and Mormon history, fiction, essay, humor and art. Among these are the diaries of Mormon leaders such as Joseph Smith, William Clayton, Heber C. Kimball, Wilford Woodruff, L. John Nuttall, Anthon H. Lund, John Henry Smith, Rudger Clawson, B. H. Roberts and Reed Smoot. Signature has also published noted studies of well-known early Mormon theologians such as James E. Talmage, B. H. Roberts, Orson Pratt, Parley P. Pratt, Brigham Young, John Widtsoe, and award-winning biographies of significant early Mormons such as, Joseph Smith, Sidney Rigdon, Wilford Woodruff, John Taylor, as well as a biography of thirty three of the plural wives of Joseph Smith.

== Criticism ==
A number of books produced by the publisher related to Mormon history have been considered controversial. Some Signature Books authors view this as "quality liberal thinking on controversial LDS topics," while some more orthodox writers view Signature as "the main vehicle for publications that challenge the borders of Mormon orthodoxy," as Terryl Givens wrote.

Many Signature Books authors have been excommunicated from the LDS Church, and some have resigned their membership, often for causes related to their Signature Books publication. These include D. Michael Quinn, Lavina Fielding Anderson, Brent Metcalfe, David P. Wright, Dan Vogel, Grant H. Palmer, Stan Larson, Simon G. Southerton, H. Michael Marquardt, David J. Buerger, Edward J. Ashment, Janice Merrill Allred, Paul Toscano, and Maxine Hanks.

== Controversy with FARMS ==
Signature Books was sometimes at odds with the Foundation for Ancient Research and Mormon Studies (FARMS), an organization of Mormon scholars and apologists which promoted orthodox Mormon historical scholarship. Author Simon Southerton referred to Signature Books as "a perennial thorn in the side of FARMS." One example was Signature Book's publication of Grant H. Palmer's 2002 book An Insider's View of Mormon Origins. The publication of this book immediately resulted in five negative book reviews by FARMS. Ron Priddis of Signature Books responded to these reviews by stating: "Is nothing beyond the reach of sarcasm by FARMS polemicists?"

In 1992 Signature Books threatened to sue FARMS for referring to some of its writers as "anti-Mormon" in reviews of its books that appeared in the Review on Books of the Book of Mormon. The reviews that initiated the threatened suit were of the Signature-published The Word of God: Essays on Mormon Scripture. In one of the contested reviews Stephen E. Robinson had written, "Korihor's back, and this time he's got a printing press. In its continuing assault upon traditional Mormonism, Signature Books promotes with its recent and dubiously titled work, The Word of God, ...naturalistic assumptions...in dealing with Latter-day Saint belief."

Signature Books asserts that several of the scholars who participated in New Approaches to the Book of Mormon: Explorations in Critical Methodology considered themselves active and participating members of the LDS faith. The FARMS reviewers, for their part, considered these authors to be opponents to the LDS tradition. And indeed at least three of the authors in New Approaches were shortly afterward excommunicated from the church. Signature management made an inquiry with FARMS management, holding that such inferences were insulting and could be considered libelous. Signature then requested a retraction.

Daniel C. Peterson, an LDS scholar and member of FARMS, published a response in various newspapers in Utah. In his response, he stated that "Signature Books and George D. Smith seem...to have a clear (if unadmitted) agenda, an agenda that is often hostile to centrally important beliefs of The Church of Jesus Christ of Latter-day Saints".

In 2004, Signature Books posted on its web site a speech given by John Hatch, in which Hatch said, "After reading the (FARMS) reviews myself, it appears to me, and is my opinion, that FARMS is interested in making Mormonism's past appear as normal as possible to readers by attacking history books that discuss complex or difficult aspects of the church's past. ... I am deeply troubled by what I see as continued efforts to attack honest scholarly work."

The friction between the two groups largely wound down, beginning when FARMS was assimilated into Brigham Young University's Neal A. Maxwell Institute for Religious Scholarship in 2006. The Institute gradually reorganized FARMS, the FARMS Review was renamed to Mormon Studies Review, Peterson was replaced as editor in 2012, and ultimately in 2018 complete ownership of the Review was transferred to the University of Illinois Press.
