= 7EP =

7EP may refer to:

== Music ==
- An extended play, whose disc diameter is often 7 inches
- 7 (U2 EP), an EP by Irish rock band U2
- 7 (Sixx:A.M. EP), an EP by American rock trio Sixx:A.M.
- 7 (Lil Nas X EP), an EP by American rapper and singer Lil Nas X

== Other ==
- Seventh East Press, an independent student newspaper at Brigham Young University

== See also ==
- EP7, an EP by Autechre released in 1999
