= Seventh East Press =

Independent student newspaper at Brigham Young University

- Type: Independent student newspaper
- Format: Print
- Founded: October 6, 1981
- Ceased publication: April 1, 1983
- Language: English
- Circulation: 4,000
- Price: 25¢

The Seventh East Press (7EP) was an American student newspaper at Brigham Young University (BYU) in Utah that published 29 issues from October 6, 1981, to April 1, 1983. Its peak was 4,000 copies. The newspaper was banned from being sold on campus in February 1983 after publishing an interview with Sterling M. McMurrin, a former institute teacher of the Church of Jesus Christ of Latter-day Saints (LDS Church) who stated that he never literally believed in the Book of Mormon. Afterwards, the 7EP's sales notably decreased, and it ceased publication later that year. Several contributors had their faithfulness questioned by their local leadership at the request of LDS Church leader Mark E. Petersen.

== History ==
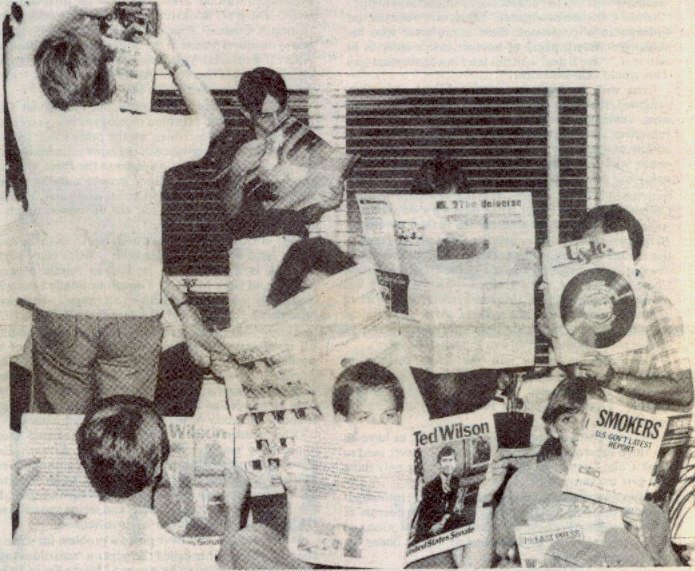
7EP contributors

Ron Priddis and Anthony Schmitt, both graduate students at Brigham Young University, founded the Seventh East Press to give an "alternative voice" to BYU faculty and students. Maxine Hanks and Gary Bergera were co-founding staff members, with Hanks writing the "Thrills" arts and entertainment feature and Bergera writing the "Grey Matters" column on theological issues. Elbert Peck, the periodical's first managing editor, said that he wanted to "help increase intellectual dialogue on campus". The students wanted the paper's design to appear conservative, in hopes that its articles could be "more daring". Priddis, Schmitt, Hanks, and Peck produced the first issue of the 7EP on October 6, 1981. Peck cut and pasted columns, Schmitt designed the layout and advertisements, and Hanks typed and pasted copy. Schmitt and Hanks hand-lettered the headlines. Their initial print run was 5,000 copies, and subsequent issues had a print run of 5,000 copies as well. Tim Slover became managing editor beginning with the April 12, 1982, issue. Scott Wooley, a University of Chicago law student, succeeded Slover as managing editor, and Dean Huffaker started managing production in the October 12, 1982, issue. Dean Huffaker became managing editor starting with the January 11, 1983, issue that sparked the publication's ban from being sold on campus.

=== Notable articles and campus ban on sales ===
The 7EP wrote an article about an apartment complex near the BYU campus that required the ecclesiastical endorsement of its occupants. Afterwards, "with encouragement from the American Civil Liberties Union", the requirement was rescinded. In her article "The LDS intellectual community and church leadership: A contemporary chronology", Lavina Fielding Anderson cites several Seventh East Press articles as influential in the dialogue between LDS intellectuals and general authorities in the LDS Church. One of these noteworthy publications was the November 18, 1981, address to the BYU student history association by D. Michael Quinn, responding to Church elder Boyd K. Packer's August 1981 address. Packer had advised Church Educational System employees that they should take a selective approach to history to avoid having it challenge faithful members. Quinn argued that such a history "border[ed] on idolatry" by presenting LDS leaders as flawless beings. Quinn's address was later reprinted in Faithful History. Priddis's story on the Ernest Wilkinson spy ring was reprinted in Utah Holiday. The 7EP also covered controversial issues that were not as weighty, such as whether the faculty refrigerators in the Office of Research Administration were being used for lunches or specimens, and how two English professors received a very nice carpet in their offices that was usually reserved for deans.

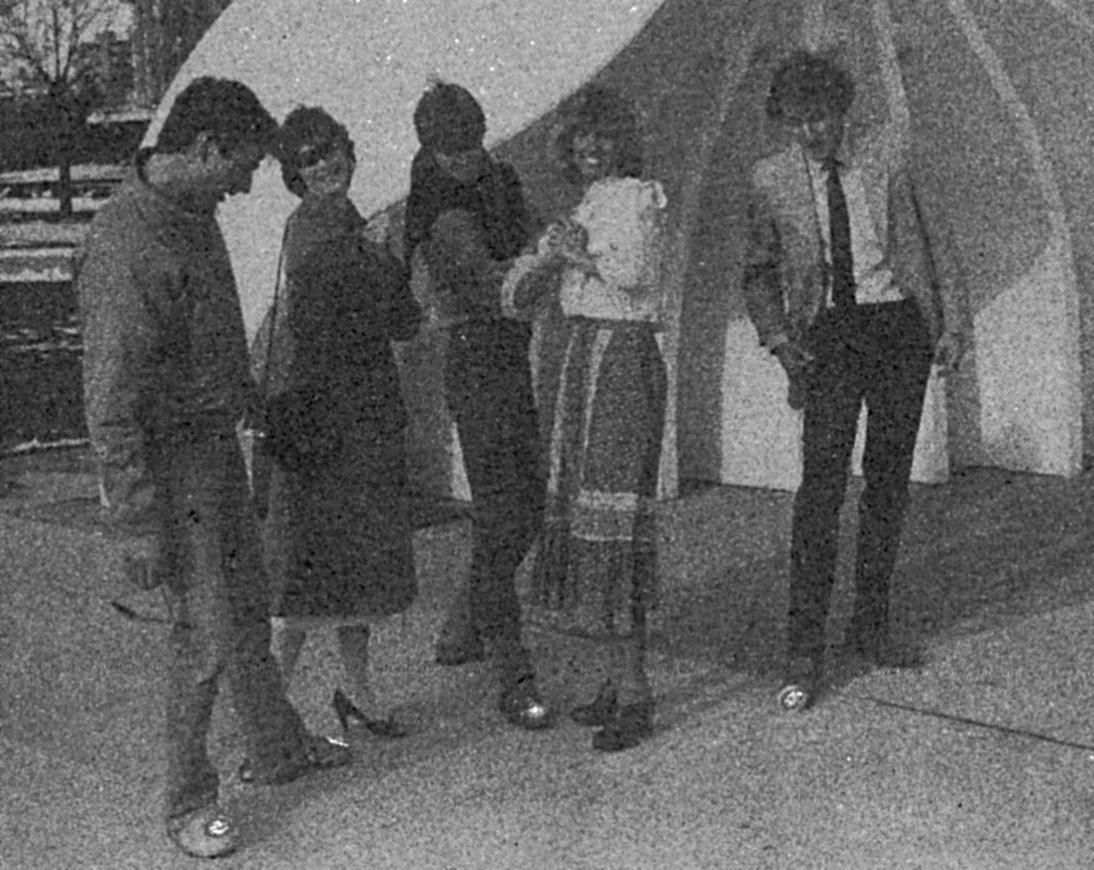
BYU students demonstrate the use of fictional "shoe mirrors"

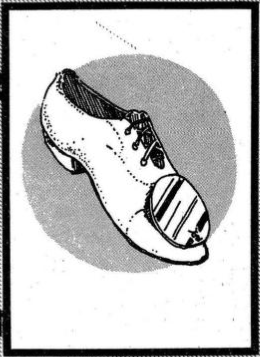
Illustration of a shoe mirror

In an interview published in the January 11, 1983, issue, Sterling M. McMurrin stated that he did not believe that the Book of Mormon was "authentic", even though he was an institute teacher more than 20 years before the interview. McMurrin said that elements of heresy, or unorthodox beliefs, were present in "virtually all of the orthodox". Subsequently, on February 11, 1983, the university's public communications director, Paul Richards, told 7EP editor Dean Huffaker that BYU would no longer sell the paper at the campus bookstore or newsstands. There was a rumor that Ezra Taft Benson, then leader of the Quorum of the Twelve Apostles, believed that the paper should not be sold on campus. Maxine Hanks stated that he was particularly upset by the articles on homosexuality at BYU, the article on the Church's Office of the Patriarch, and the McMurrin interview. 7EP managing editor Dean Huffaker stated that he thought the ban "had to do more with the personality [of McMurrin] than what we said". In response to the campus ban, the managing editor of The Denver Post, Tim Kelly, canceled a scheduled lecture to the Society of Professional Journalists at BYU. He later stated that the ban was not illegal, but that it was unethical. In response to the campus ban on sales of the 7EP, Nelson Wadsworth, an assistant professor of journalism, left BYU for Utah State University.

The 7EP created a parody issue of The Daily Universe, BYU's official student newspaper, as an April Fools' Day joke. One column, in a satire of their own campus ban, discussed the banning of a fictional "shoe-mirror" that men could use to look up women's skirts. The fictional interview with standards officer Carmichael Whitaker stated that it was not a violation of the First Amendment to stop selling shoe mirrors on campus, since they did not actually destroy any shoe mirrors. Another satirical headline proclaimed: "No Censorship at BYU: Everything OK".

=== Finances ===
The newspaper had financial difficulties. Priddis sold his car for $1700 to fund the paper, and most contributors were volunteers. The Universe accused the 7EP of stealing their advertising. When an advertiser asked the 7EP to use the same advertisement they used in The Universe, the 7EP cut out the advertisement from the newspaper and reproduced it rather than paying The Universe for a photographic copy of it. Advertising revenue was not sufficient to pay for the newspaper's costs, and all but two issues were printed at a loss. The 7EP received donations from more than 200 BYU professors and alumni. Their usual revenue from sales was about $500 per issue. The price of a copy was raised from 10 cents to 25 cents from issue 9.

The newspaper's articles about controversial topics damaged relationships with advertisers. LDS-owned Deseret Industries stopped advertising with the paper after its two-part series on homosexuality. The BYU Bookstore likewise pulled their advertisement after a "Campus Chatter" item about the discount Bookstore board members received from the store. Gary Bergera's "Grey Matters" column, which examined controversial theological subjects, was unpopular with advertisers, but popular with readers. After BYU Studies requested that their interns not write for the 7EP, Bergera stopped writing "Grey Matters". Scott Dunn was also an intern at BYU Studies, and continued writing for the 7EP under the pseudonym Dick Townsend. Dunn helped the press with technical materials like a transcription machine and a photo-enlarger. After the paper was banned from being sold on campus, the 7EP lost 40 percent of its revenue.

=== Church investigations ===
Brent Metcalfe, a security guard at the Church Office Building, was questioned about his writing for the 7EP and Sunstone. Metcalfe stated that he was "forced to resign" from his job in April 1983. An anonymous source reported that Roy Doxey, then the director of church correlation, wanted to know about the papers Metcalfe was studying at the Church Historical Library, which were on Elias Smith and others. Doxey denied asking about Metcalfe. Metcalfe believed that his firing was because of a few people in church leadership who perceived him as a threat, even though he viewed his own work as apologetic and not scholarly. According to Anderson, Mark E. Petersen ordered investigations into vocal progressive members, including Gary Bergera, a contributor to the 7EP. His stake president asked him specifically about his interview with Gerald and Sandra Tanner and a piece he wrote on an anti-Mormon conference for Sunstone Review. Hanks was released from her calling teaching classes on Sundays in the Missionary Training Center. Anderson reported that Hanks's supervisor denied that her release was because of her writing at the 7EP, suggesting that it occurred because she was "perhaps a little too intelligent for the elders".

== Works cited ==
- Anderson, Lavina Fielding (Spring 1993). "The LDS intellectual community and church leadership: A contemporary chronology" (PDF). Dialogue: A Journal of Mormon Thought. 26 (1): 7–64. doi:10.2307/45228619. JSTOR 45228619.
- Maxine Hanks, Ron Priddis, Gary Bergera, Dean Huffaker and Anthony Schmidt (2001). What a Long, Strange Trip It's Been: The Seventh East Press–Twenty Years Later (audio recording). Sunstone.
- Ostler, Blake (January 11, 1983). "7EP Interviews Sterling M. McMurrin".
