= Béla Petsco =

American Latter Day Saint writer (1943–2022)

- Born: March 10, 1943; Queens, New York City, US
- Died: May 12, 2022 (aged 79)
- Education: Brigham Young University
- Occupation: Writer
- Writing career
- Notable work: Nothing Very Important and Other Stories

Béla Petsco (March 10, 1943 – May 12, 2022) was an American writer who was the author of Nothing Very Important and Other Stories, a collection of connected stories about missionary work in the Church of Jesus Christ of Latter-day Saints (LDS Church). He was born to Hungarian immigrants and grew up in Queens in New York City. He converted to the LDS Church after watching the film Brigham Young. He served an LDS mission in the California South mission.

He attended Brigham Young University (BYU) for his undergraduate and graduate studies in English and creative writing where he wrote Nothing Very Important and Other Stories as his master's thesis. Petsco taught composition as an adjunct professor at BYU, but his contract was not renewed in 1983, around the same time as the theatrical adaptation of Nothing Very Important. Subsequently, his health declined and he stopped writing fiction.

== Conversion and education ==
Béla Petsco was born on March 10, 1943, in Queens, New York City to Hungarian immigrants Etelka Farkas Bodi and Béla Peczko. His father was a sculptor who also worked to create bronze models of other artists' work. At the age of 12, Petsco saw the movie Brigham Young, which made him curious about the LDS Church. He read The 27th Wife by Irving Wallace and was impressed with the LDS beliefs of baptism for the dead and marriages for all eternity.

On a trip to California, his family stopped in Salt Lake City, where Petsco bought a Book of Mormon for fifty cents. He read the book and believed its teachings. During the 1964 World's Fair, Petsco visited the Mormon pavilion and requested more information on the LDS church. After meeting with LDS missionaries, Petsco was baptized. Two and a half years after his baptism, Petsco served an LDS mission in the South California mission, which included parts of Arizona at the time.

He started attending BYU in 1970, initially studying archeology, but changing his major to English after winning prizes for two of his short stories. Petsco taught composition at BYU as an adjunct professor after graduating with his MA in 1977.

== Nothing Very Important and Other Stories ==
Petsco wrote Nothing Very Important for his 1977 MA thesis. The stories were based on events from his life as a missionary. Initially, Petsco could not find a publisher for Nothing Very Important and self-published it in 1979. His friend, Kathryn Clark-Spencer, did the artwork for the book. Signature Books re-published it in 1984 under their Orion imprint.

A student club called the Hyde Park Club produced a play based on the book in November 1983. Dallin H. Oaks, then-president of BYU, wrote a letter to Ezra Taft Benson, then the President of the Quorum of the Twelve Apostles (LDS Church). The letter is quoted in Bergera's and Priddis's Brigham Young University: A House of Faith. In it, Oaks said that Nothing Very Important "does not strengthen [Petsco's] efforts for employment at BYU". Petsco's adjunct contract was not renewed in 1983. Petsco's health declined and he stopped writing fiction after this time. (The account is complicated, however, by the fact that Oaks left BYU in 1980. By November 1983 he was serving as a justice on the Utah State Supreme Court, having no affiliation with BYU.)

Critics hailed the work as the first significant literary work by and about a Mormon from an author outside the Wasatch Front. The book won the 1979 Association for Mormon Letters award for short fiction. Reviewers remarked that the book used realism to show a truthful but sometimes painful picture of Mormonism. Subsequent summaries of Mormon fiction mentioned the book as a significant part of missionary fiction.

== Other writing and death ==
Petsco intended that Nothing Very Important be the second of a trilogy of books based on his life. The first novel, Salem, was to center around his marriage to his wife and her death in childbirth. A chapter from Salem appeared in the BYU student literary magazine Wye in 1974. Petsco's story "The Mustard Seed" was included in Neal Lambert and Richard Cracroft's compilation 22 Young Mormon Writers. Petsco discussed Nothing Very Important and how to write at an event put on by the Utah County League of Utah Writers in 1987.

Petsco was proficient at family history research. He presented at the Payson Stake Priesthood genealogy seminar in 1976 and directed it in 1977.

He wrote letters to the editor of The Salt Lake Tribune. In 1986, he described his dislike of a "rededication and commitment" pledge that was being signed in conjunction with the restoration of the Provo Tabernacle, arguing that Brigham Young didn't need to sign a temperance pledge to "do what [he] ought." Also in 1986, he confessed that while he was not a fan of Carol Lynn Pearson's writing, that she should not have to create an "issue-packed book". He wrote: "I believe she was right to gloss over the sordid details of both homosexuality and AIDS as she was right to focus on the personal aspect of coping with the two diseases." In 1977, he argued against returning the crown of St. Stephen to the communist government in Hungary, arguing that it would give them legitimacy according to "Hungarian theory".

Petsco died on May 12, 2022.
