= Mormon Alliance =

Latter Day Saint organization

The Mormon Alliance (originally the Mormon Defense League, but not to be conflated with a later organization of that name) was founded on July 4, 1992 by Paul Toscano to counter perceived spiritual and ecclesiastical abuse in the Church of Jesus Christ of Latter-day Saints and to protect the Church against defamatory actions. During the next few months, the trustees established a broad range of supporting purposes: providing a comprehensive definition of spiritual abuse, working to reconcile leaders and members who were out of harmony, establishing a Members’ Bill of Rights, providing a forum for a reasonable and tempered discussion of governance in the Church, critiquing general conference, and identifying and documenting cases of spiritual and ecclesiastical abuse. Janice Merrill Allred and Lavina Fielding Anderson, two of the trustees, became co-chairs of the Case Reports Committee in the fall of 1992 and served until the closing of the Mormon Alliance. Toscano and Fielding Anderson were excommunicated by the Church following their actions.

The Alliance published a quarterly newsletter from Fall 1993 to January 2006, as well as three volumes of case reports online and in print. The Alliance also sponsored quarterly meetings, two of which would follow Church General Conferences and one in conjunction with the Sunstone symposium held in Salt Lake City, Utah.

According to the group's website, the Mormon Alliance dissolved in December 2016.
