= Brent Lee Metcalfe =

Scholar of the Latter Day Saint movement

Brent Lee Metcalfe is an independent researcher and writer of the Latter Day Saint Movement. He is also credited on over sixty video games, primarily as a writer.

== Writings in Mormon studies ==
=== Seventh East Press ===
In the early 1980s, Metcalfe contributed to the Seventh East Press and Sunstone, while at the same time working as a security guard in the Church Office Building of the Church of Jesus Christ of Latter-day Saints (LDS Church). According to Metcalfe, he was questioned by LDS Church authorities about his writing for the Press and Sunstone. An anonymous source reported that Roy Doxey, then the director of church correlation, wanted to know about the papers Metcalfe was studying at the Church Historical Library, which were on Elias Smith and others. Doxey denied asking about Metcalfe.

At first Metcalfe was placed on 30 days probation by the LDS Security department and ordered to "sever yourself from involvement with people, groups, or publications that teach doctrines, privately or publicly, which are contrary to those of the Prophet." Metcalfe subsequently resigned from the Seventh East Press and told Sunstone that he would no longer write for them. His supervisor removed the probation, but on April 8, 1983, Metcalfe's employment was terminated. Metcalfe believed that his firing was because of a few people in church leadership who perceived him as a threat, even though he viewed his own work as apologetic and not scholarly.

=== New Approaches to the Book of Mormon ===
In 1993 Metcalfe organized a group of scholars to publish New Approaches to the Book of Mormon: Explorations in Critical Methodology, a series of essays that sought to apply techniques of higher criticism to the Book of Mormon. These scholars included Dan Vogel, Stan Larson, David P. Wright, and John Kunich. In it, Metcalfe himself wrote an essay that was the first to advance the Mosiah priority theory, or that Joseph Smith began dictating the Book of Mormon from the Book of Mosiah. The reception of the Mosiah priority theory was gradual, but it is now well accepted by researchers and in scholarly publications about the text.

According to the Deseret News, the response from the apologetic community was "vitriolic." The LDS Church fired Brigham Young University professor David P. Wright for his contribution to the volume, and excommunicated both Wright and Metcalfe shortly thereafter. An entire issue of FARMS Review of Books was devoted to rebuttals of New Approaches, though mostly not to the Mosiah priority theory.

William J. Hamblin, responding specifically to an article by Metcalfe, phrased the opening 18 paragraphs of his essay to form an acrostic spelling out "Metcalfe is Butthead." The message was discovered after his review had gone to press, and was edited out in archived copies of the journal.

=== Later work ===
Metcalfe has continued publishing on Mormon studies. Metcalfe is on the editorial board of the John Whitmer Historical Association.

== Personal life ==
Metcalfe is a native of New Zealand. He grew up a member of the LDS Church in a devout family, and served a mission for the LDS Church. His father was the managing director of the Temple Department for the LDS Church.

Metcalfe worked for many years as a technical writer in the information technology and video games industries, and is credited on over sixty video game titles.

=== Mark Hofmann murders ===
After being fired from his job in security for the LDS Church for his writings, Metcalfe worked first for Steve Christensen and later for Mark Hofmann. According to Metcalfe, he had written a letter to LDS Church leader Gordon B. Hinckley, disputing the grounds for his termination. Hinckley never responded, but was shortly thereafter offered the job by Christensen, which Metcalfe felt was orchestrated by Hinckley. Metcalfe had become an ardent supporter of the forged Salamander letter, and was hired by Christensen to research the letter. When it became rumored that Metcalfe had lost his belief in the historical claims of the LDS Church, Christensen terminated the project and fired Metcalfe. Metcalfe then assisted Hofmann in leaking the existence of the letter to the press, contrary to the wishes of the LDS Church.

As it began to be clearer that Hofmann was counterfeiting documents, Christensen and Kathy Sheets were murdered by separate bombs created by Hofmann, and Hofmann himself was injured when a later bomb he created inadvertently exploded. As both Metcalfe and the police were afraid Metcalfe might be a future target, he went into hiding. Metcalfe became a suspect himself at one point in time. Metcalfe said of the time, "It was soul-crushing ... I felt like somehow I was responsible for what had happened. And I went through a very long phase of just wishing that I had never been born."

== Publications ==
- Metcalfe, Brent Lee, ed. (1993). New Approaches to the Book of Mormon: Explorations in Critical Methodology. Salt Lake City, Utah: Signature Books. ISBN 1-56085-017-5.
- Vogel, Dan; Metcalfe, Brent Lee, eds. (2002). American Apocrypha: Essays on the Book of Mormon. Salt Lake City, Utah: Signature Books. ISBN 1-56085-151-1.
