= Julia McDonald =

American novelist

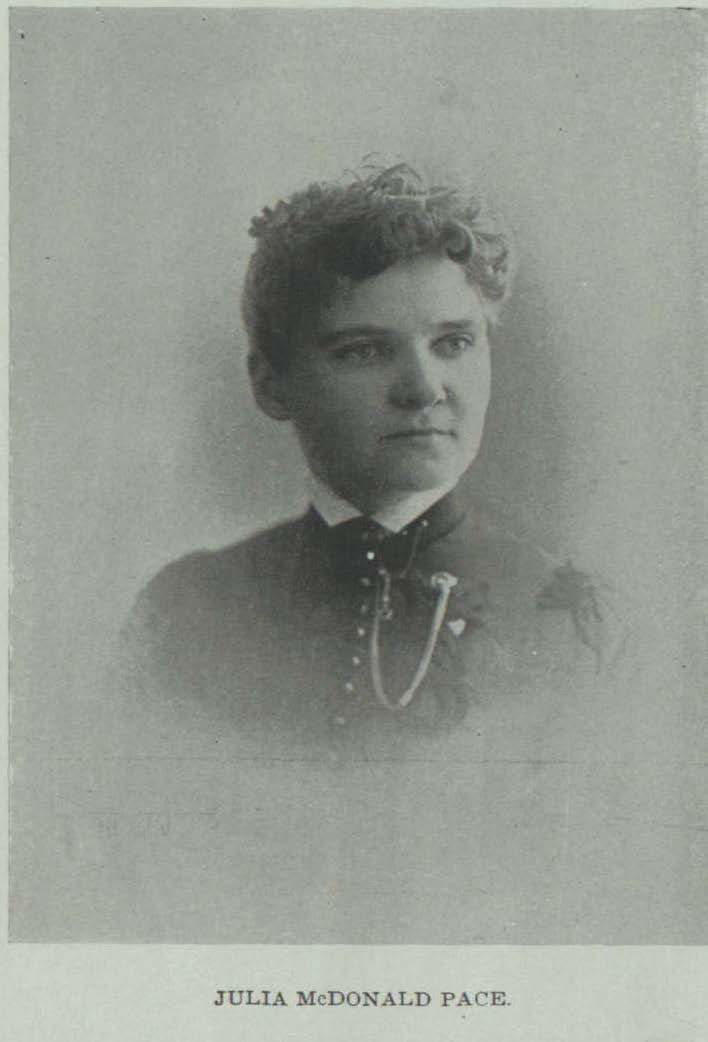
- Obituary photo from 1900.
- Born: Julia Ann Ivins; December 2, 1859; Salt Lake City, Utah Territory
- Died: January 17, 1900 (aged 40); St. George, Utah
- Occupation: Writer
- Years active: 1890–1900
- Notable work: A Ship of Hagoth

Julia Ann Ivins McDonald (or MacDonald) Pace (December 2, 1859 – January 17, 1900), who wrote under the name Julia McDonald, was a scholar, medical student and writer who was born in Utah Territory in 1859. She was a members of The Church of Jesus Christ of Latter-day Saints and was part of the Mormon Home literature movement in the late 19th and early 20th centuries. She is best known as the author of the novel A Ship of Hagoth (1896), which was adapted in two stage plays and the 1931 motion picture Corianton: A Story of Unholy Love.

== Early life ==
McDonald was born Julia Ann Ivins in Salt Lake City on December 2, 1859. Her father, Israel Ivins, was a prominent surveyor and physician whose second wife, Julia Hill, was Julia's mother. When she was only one year old, her family was called by Brigham Young to join the "Cotton Mission" of Mormon pioneers to settle St. George and begin producing a cotton crop.

Julia grew up in St. George in a large and prominent polygamous family. Her older brother, Anthony Ivins, later became an apostle in the Church of Jesus Christ of Latter-day Saints, and her cousin, Heber J. Grant, was the Church's president from 1918 to 1945. In 1881, Julia married Aaron Johnson McDonald and, the next year, she moved to Mesa, Arizona with her husband and newborn daughter LeClaire. In 1884, Aaron died of an injury he received falling off of a wagon, leaving Julia a widow and young mother at the age of 24.

== Medical student ==
After her husband's death, Julia moved to Salt Lake City and began studying obstetrics with Dr. Ellias R. Shipp. In 1888, she became the plural wife of Mormon Elder John E. Pace, who encouraged her to travel to Ann Arbor to study medicine at the University of Michigan. While in medical school, she began to write dispatches back to Utah to be published in the Young Woman's Journal, a monthly periodical founded by Brigham Young's daughter Susa Young Gates for use by the church's Young Ladies Mutual Improvement Association.

In 1890, McDonald used the pseudonym "Cactus" to write a series of columns for the Young Woman's Journal, called "Leaves from the Journal of a Medical Student", describing her life far away from Utah in a secular university. She also wrote for the journal's regular feature on health and hygiene under the same pseudonym. A frequent theme of her writing was that women, as well as men, had a spiritual need for education and that her reason "the acquisition of knowledge in relation to our spiritual welfare and progress".

Though McDonald completed all three years of coursework for her medical degree, she suffered a heart attack in 1890 and had to leave school before graduation. Her cousin, Heber J. Grant, who was traveling in the east at the time, came to Ann Arbor and escorted her back to St. George.

== Writing career ==
When McDonald returned from Michigan, she began writing short fiction under her "Cactus" pseudonym. Her first short story, a religious-themed ghost story called "A Mysterious Visitor", appeared in the October 1891 issue of the Young Women's Journal. McDonald was an important contributor to the Home Literature movement in Utah, which arose in the late 19th century in response to Orson F. Whitney's speech "Home Literature", which encouraged Latter-day Saints to use their faith and religious tradition to produce their own literature. Her best known work was a novel based on the Book of Mormon titled A Ship of Hagoth, which literary critic Eric Samuelson lists as part of "an immediate response to Whitney's work" by creating "an imagined life for the minor Book of Mormon character Corianton".

A Ship of Hagoth was serialized over 11 issues of the Young Woman's Journal in 1896–1897. It builds on an earlier novelization of the same character's life, called simply Corianton, by LDS general authority B. H. Roberts. To Roberts' characterization, McDonald added an elaborate romantic plot involving Corianton, his brother Shiblon, and two women named Isabel and Relia. This part of McDonald's story was incorporated directly into the Orestes Bean 1902 play Corianton: An Aztec Romance, Bean's 1910 Broadway musical An Aztec Romance, and the 1931 film Corianton: A Story of Unholy Love. In 2019, Scott Hales cited A Ship of Hagoth as an important contribution to early Mormon letters. In 2022, it was named one of the 100 most significant works of Mormon literature by the Association for Mormon Letters, and it appeared in The Corianton Saga, an anthology of fiction and drama based on the Corianton story edited by Ardis E. Parshall.

== Death ==
McDonald's health deteriorated rapidly after she wrote A Ship of Hagoth, and, on January 17, 1900, she died in St. George, Utah at the age of 40.

== Works cited ==
- Parshall, Ardis E. (2022). "Introduction to the Corianton Saga". The Corianton Saga. By Common Consent Press. pp. vii–xii. ISBN 9781948218528.
- Erdman, Kimball Stewart (1969). Israel Ivins: A Biography.
- "Julia McDonald Pace". Young Woman's Journal. 11 (6): 242–247. June 1900.
- Simpson, Thomas W. (2016). American Universities and the Birth of Modern Mormonism. University of North Carolina Press.
- Burke, Romney (2022). Susa Young Gates: Daughter of Mormonism. Signature.
- Tait, Lisa Olsen (2012). "The Young Women's Journal: Gender and Generations in a Mormon Women's Magazine". American Periodicals. 22 (1): 51–71. doi:10.1353/amp.2012.0002. S2CID 144872923.
- Cactus (December 1890). "Leaves from the Journal of a Medical Student: Home-Life and Amusements". Young Woman's Journal. 2 (3): 138–140.
