= Corianton: A Story of Unholy Love =

1931 film

- Directed by: Wilfrid North
- Written by: Orestes Utah Bean; Wilfrid North
- Based on: Corianton: A Nephite Story (1902) by B. H. Roberts; A Ship of Hagoth (1896) by Julia McDonald; Corianton: an Aztec Romance by Orestes Utah Bean
- Produced by: Lester Park; Byron Park
- Starring: Eric Elden; Reginald Barlow; Theo Pennington; Herschel Mayall; Joseph Smiley; The Mormon Tabernacle Choir
- Music by: Edgar Stillman Kelly
- Release date: 1931
- Running time: 90 minutes
- Country: United States
- Language: English

Corianton: A Story of Unholy Love is a 1931 American drama film based on the story of Corianton, the son of the prophet Alma in the Book of Mormon. Corianton appears only briefly in three passages in the Book of Mormon. However, as scholars Randy Astle and Gideon Burton point out, his story is one of the only stories in the Book of Mormon "with any sex in it", which has made it a popular subject of Book of Mormon-themed fiction and drama for more than a century.

Before the film was made, the Corianton story had been the basis of two novellas (including one by an LDS general authority), one traveling stage play, and one Broadway play with music by a Broadway composer. The film brought in elements from all of these previous works but was ultimately unsuccessful and resulted in multiple lawsuits against the producers by their financial backers. In 2009, the film was restored by archivists at Brigham Young University.

== Plot ==
As the film begins, the people of Zarahemla are talking about the upcoming trial of Korihor, the anti-Christ preacher who has become popular with many people. Korihor will be tried in front of Alma, the prophet, who is also the chief judge in the land. Alma's son Corianton is shown courting Relia, who loves him, but has been promised by her father to Corianton's pious brother Shiblon. Corianton has fallen under Korihor's sway and argues with his brother, Shiblon, that no man should be punished for his beliefs. Korihor is brought before Alma, who acquits him on all civic charges but chastises him for tempting God. Korihor denies the existence of God and demands proof of His existence. Corianton interrupts Korihor and demands that he stop speaking against his father. As he is shouting his denials of God and his defiance of Alma, Korihor is struck by a bolt of lightning and made dumb.

Corianton is shaken up by Korihor's fate, and he re-converts to his father's religion and agrees to be part of a missionary force to the city of Antionum, the chief city of the Zoramites, a people who have fallen away from the Church. Corianton proves to be a powerful missionary, raising the concern of the Zoramite prince, Seantum, who knows of Corianton's attraction to Korihor and decides to set a trap for him that will destroy Alma's mission. Seantum conspires with his lover, Isobel, to set the trap. Isobel pretends to be Zoan, the daughter of a Nephite prisoner.

Isobel/Zoan approaches Corianton and tells him that her father, upon hearing that there were Nephites in Antionum, instructed her to visit her relative, Seantum, and listen to the missionaries. She entices Corianton to attend a party at Seantum's palace. The party turns out to be a drunken, libidinous affair, and Seantum spreads the word far and wide that Corianton has been drinking and carousing with a prostitute. After dispatching criers to spread the word about Corianton's behavior, Seantum delivers a soliloquy that announces his plan to use Alma's downfall to become the King of Zarahemla.

Seantum's plan succeeds, and Alma's party is driven from the city. Shiblon tries to convince Corianton that Seantum has deceived him, but Corianton refuses to believe it, and Shiblon is arrested for slander. Seantum discovers that Isobel has fallen genuinely in love with Corianton and wants to see him again to make apologies. Corianton discovers that he really has been tricked by Isobel and Seantum, and he confronts her with her treachery. She tells him that she participated in the plot because she was raised to see Nephites as enemies, but that she fell in love with him as soon as she saw him. She pledges to take him to her home in Siron, where she will devote herself to his mission and his welfare. After some protesting, Corianton agrees to go with her.

Seantum goes to Siron to kill Corianton and punish Isobel for her betrayal. Isobel tells him that she never loved Corianton and only brought him to her home to further his disgrace, but when he discovers that she is only trying to save his life, he becomes even more enraged. Shiblon comes to Isobel's home to retrieve Corianton. She tells him that she will show him where Corianton is if he will agree to take her with them when they leave. Shiblon refuses and looks for Corianton himself. Isobel determines that the only way to save Corianton from Shiblon's wrath is to send him back to his father with Shiblon. She starts an argument with him and tells him that she does not love him. She runs to Seantum and professes to love him—all to make Corianton willing to leave. Corianton grabs a sword and starts to fight Seantum, but Shiblon finds them and interrupts the fight. Seantum kills Shiblon, and Corianton becomes disconsolate and vows to head home.

The scene shifts back to Zarahemla, where Alma is hosting a feast for the converts he made in Antionum before the mission collapsed. They are joined by a group professing to be converts from Siron. However, they are really soldiers from Seantum's army who have come as part of a planned Zoramite/Lamanite invasion of Zarahemla. Alma tells Relia about Corianton's disgrace and, while they are consoling each other, Corinatnon comes upon them and begs Alma's forgiveness. He tells them both about Shiblon's death, and then he tells them about a dream that he had of the coming Christ. Alma is joyful that his wayward son has returned, and he returns to the feast with his son.

Isobel/Zoan learns of Seantum's plans and comes to warn Corianton. She meets Relia, who rebuffs her for causing Corianton's downfall. Isabol/Zoan tells Relia that she loves Corianton, and Relia comforts her. Together, they sound the alarm to indicate that the city is under attack. The palace is soon overrun with Seantum's invading army, but Corianton leads the Nephite army and drives the invading forces from the city. The defeated Seantum finds Isobel and stabs her. Corianton defeats Seantum in a sword fight, but Relia stops him from striking the killing blow. With her dying breath, Isabel exonerates Corianton of any wrongdoing, leaving him free to marry the lovely Relia, who had always been in love with Corianton but had been betrothed to Shiblon by her parents.

== Cast ==
Corianton (Eric Alden) with Relia (Alis Frost).

- Eric Elden as Corianton
- Reginald Barlow as Korihor
- Charles Edwards as Alma
- Alis Frost as Relia
- William Joy as Zebu
- Marion Martin as Sun Goddess
- Ignacio Martinnetti as Bastol
- Herschel Mayall as Laman
- H. H. McCullum as Amuioki
- Theo Pennington as Zoan Ze Isobel
- James Phillips as Shiblon
- Lillian Savin as Manetah
- Joseph Smiley as Chief Judge
- Stephen Wright as Lamarck
- Emil Yousoff as Prince Seantum

== Production ==
=== Background and sources ===
The film version of Corianton was the culmination of intense interest in the story among Latter-day Saints at the end of the 19th and beginning of the 20th century. The first use of the story as imaginative literature was by editor and LDS general authority B. H. Roberts, who, in 1889, published a novella called Corianton over five issues of the Contributor, a journal for which he was the editor. In 1902, Roberts republished the text as a stand-alone novella called Corianton: A Nephite Story.

That same year, a Utah-based playwright named Orestes Utah Bean combined Roberts' story with Julia A. McDonald's 1896 novella A Ship of Hagoth to create a stage play titled Corianton: An Aztec Romance. He did not attribute his liberal borrowings from both works. With the financial backing of George Elias Blair, Bean presented the play in Salt Lake City with Joseph Hawthorn in the title role and Rose Agnes Lane in a major female part in 1902. It was criticized by critics as too long, but was a theatrical success. It failed when it went on the road to non-Mormon audiences but was then successfully revived in Salt Lake City and other smaller Utah communities. A 1902 article from The Brooklyn Daily Eagle wrote that Bean's motivation in writing the play was to spread "the doctrine of Mormonism". Writing in his 2018 book Mormon Cinema: Origins to 1952, Randy Astle described the dialogue of the play as veering "between the contemporary and a poor pseudo-Elizabethan affectation," showing Bean's vision of Corianton as an epic.

The script continued to be improved and critics praised the shorter, 1909 version of the play. In 1912 Bean rewrote the play and called it An Aztec Romance with music by Broadway composer Harold Orlob and took it to Broadway. It had six performances but was resoundingly rejected by critics; a New York Times review described it as "sound and fury signifying nothing"; a review from The Brooklyn Daily Eagle designated it a "weird hodge-podge".

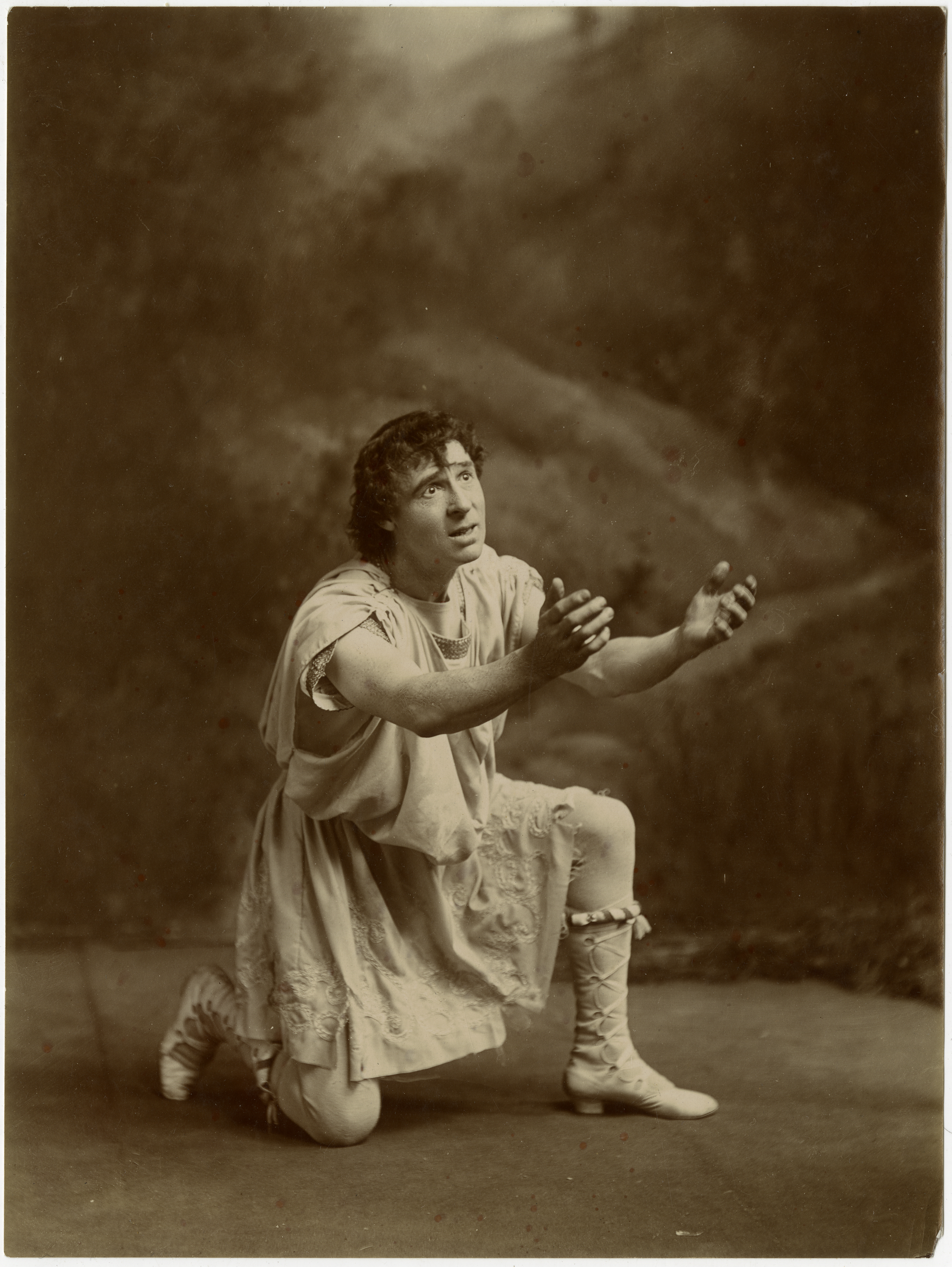
Probably Joseph Hawthorn as Corianton in the play

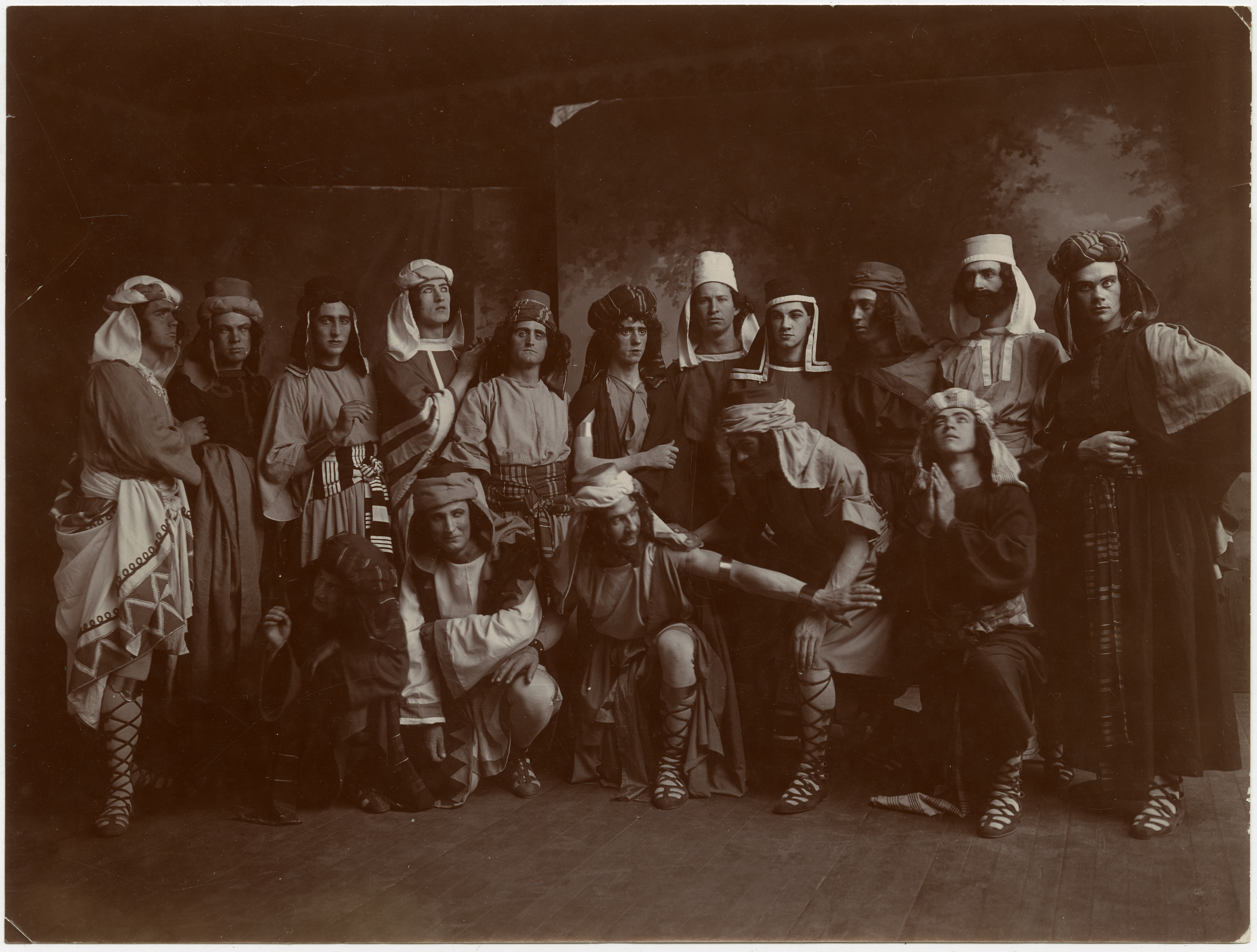
The cast of Corianton (the play)

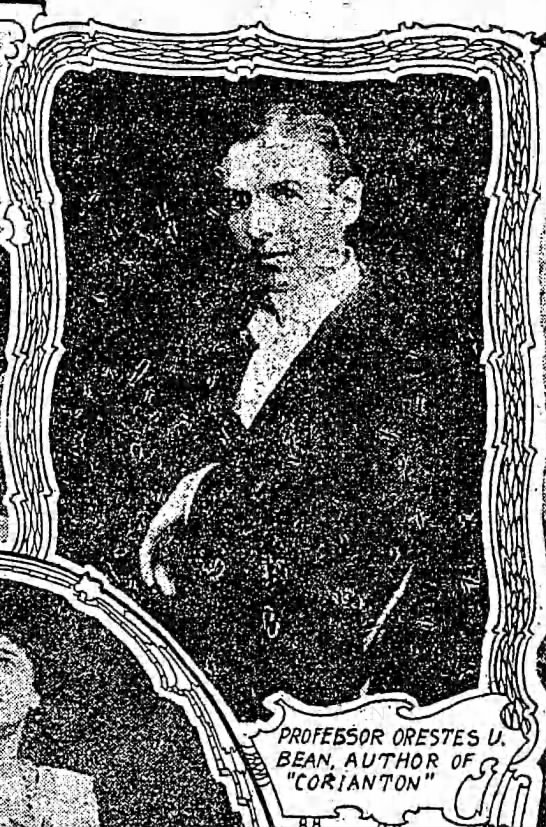
Orestes Bean

=== Development and filming ===
Corianton production crew

Advertising Circular for Corianton

In the late 1920s, Bean worked with Utah filmmaker Lester Park, and his brothers Allan and Byron, to raise operating funds and bring the Corianton story to the screen. The Parks formed the Corianton Corporation in 1929. They recruited Edgar Stillman Kelly to write the music and convinced the LDS Church to have the Tabernacle Choir provide the background music. This was one of the first instances of the Tabernacle Choir being recorded. The cost of the film was a problem, as Bean was difficult to please, and his contract with the Parks required them to pay various Bean relatives for their work as "consultants". To save on costs and to complete the film on time, the Parks filmed in black-and-white and did the majority of their filming while Bean was away at a family wedding.

One major difference from the play is that, while the stage version's dancing girls were fully clothed, the film version's wore little. The film was an early sound film, and actors retained habits from silent films like expressive gestures. Corianton: A Story of Unholy Love, directed by Wilfrid North, released in 1931 as one of the first commercially produced Mormon films. (Note: The Life of Nephi (1915) preceded Corianton: A Story of Unholy Love.) The film was produced in the Metropolitan Sound Studies in Fort Lee, New Jersey, during the winter months of 1930. The sets, with clear Art Deco influence, were designed by Joseph Physioc, a Broadway stage designer with an interest in archeology. Edgar Stillman Kelley wrote the score, with assistance from Carl Edouarde. LDS Church member Dal Clawson was the director of photography. The film was co-produced by self-help author Napoleon Hill who was accused of malfeasance by the investors. Gizmodo writer Matt Novak described Hill as a "conman" whose methods of fundraising "skirt[ed] the law"; Mormon film historian Randy Astle wrote that Hill had a "habit of overpromising". Hill and the Parks encouraged people in Idaho and Utah to invest in their film, but had difficulty procuring necessary funds for the ambitious project after the stock market crash in 1929. After the film's production, money from Corianton Corporation moved "freely into one of [Hill's] separate enterprises".

== Reception ==
Corianton: A Story of Unholy Love premiered on October 1, 1931, at Salt Lake City's Playhouse Theater and ran for two weeks there and at other venues throughout Utah. It received mostly negative reviews and attracted little interest outside of Utah Mormon circles. Astle attributed the film's poor reception to the poor sound quality of the speakers in the Playhouse Theater where the film showed. Park ran ads in newspapers apologizing for the sound quality and attempted to outfit a small community theater with appropriate speakers to show the film on the road, but as the film's financial problems increased, this plan was abandoned. In Salt Lake City, Corianton: A Story of Unholy Love was compared favorably to Ben-Hur. After its financial failure, Bean and the Park brothers faced both anger from, and multiple lawsuits by, their investors.

In January 1932, the Corianton Corporation was placed in receivership owing $65,000 to creditors. One problem was that Corianton Corporation had used money from stockholders for a project outside the film. There were several lawsuits over the film, which Bean was involved in until his death. Bean was very unhappy with the changes to his play in the film adaptation, and initiated ten lawsuits or countersuits against the Parks. In one of these lawsuits in December 1932, Bean spent five days in jail on a contempt charge for telling a judge to "shut up". The film's producers were also targeted. Author Orson Scott Card, the grandson of producer Lester Park, recalls that, after the film's failure, "Grandpa was forced to flee the state of Utah to avoid endless lawsuits and the threat of prosecution." Corianton Corporation ended in April 1932 when it failed to pay taxes.

Writing about Corianton: A Story of Unholy Love in 2018, Randy Astle wrote that the film was "on par" with other independent films of the 1930s, and is a "milestone" of Mormon film. It was the first major sound Mormon film.

Film stills

== Restoration and current status ==
Because of the legal issues surrounding the production of the film, most copies were destroyed, and for many years the film was considered lost. In 2009, however, Orson Scott Card donated a 16mm print of the film to Brigham Young University. The film was digitally restored and screened before a limited audience in September 2009. In February 2010, it was shown at a meeting of the Association for Mormon Letters at Utah Valley University in Orem. The film has never been released as a video or licensed for viewing on the Internet, because of donor stipulations from the Park family, but it remains available for research and viewing in the L. Tom Perry Special Collections archive at Brigham Young University. The film was screened at the 13th LDS Film Festival in 2014. A restored version was screened at BYU in 2023.

== Works cited ==
- Astle, Randy (2018). Mormon Cinema: Origins to 1952. New York City: Mormon Arts Center. ISBN 9780692137093.
- Parshall, Ardis E. (2022). "Introduction to the Corianton Saga". The Corianton Saga. By Common Consent Press. pp. vii–xii. ISBN 9781948218528.
- Astle, Randy; Burton, Gideon (2007). "A History of Mormon Cinema: The Second Wave". BYU Studies. 46 (2): 45–75.
