= John Kunich =

American law professor

John Charles Kunich (born December 29, 1953) is an American law professor, environmental lawyer, author, scriptwriter, and retired Air Force colonel.

== Career ==
Kunich retired as an adjunct professor at the Belmont Abbey College. He also taught as an adjunct professor at the University of North Carolina at Charlotte. He earned his Juris Doctor degree from Harvard Law School and a Master of Laws degree (LL.M.) in Environmental Law from George Washington University Law School. He earned his Bachelor and Master of Science (1979) in biological sciences from the University of Illinois Chicago. He was born and raised in Chicago. He also was a Fulbright Senior Specialist and Professor of Law at the Indian Law Institute. He has taught summer courses in China for several years at major universities in Beijing, Chengdu, Guangzhou, and Xi'an, including the University of International Business and Economics as well as Sichuan University.

John Kunich has twice testified before U.S. Congressional Committees, regarding environmental matters relating to endangered species. He has been interviewed regarding legal matters numerous times, on such networks as CNN International, PBS, Fox News, MSNBC, and WGN. He is the author of dozens of scholarly journal articles in the fields of environmental law, constitutional law, and leadership. These pieces have been published in the law reviews of the USC Gould School of Law, Georgetown University Law Center, Washington University School of Law, and many other leading law schools, as well as The Journal of Leadership Studies.

Professor Kunich has participated in more than 100 presentations or debates during the last few years. He has spoken at Oxford University, the Royal Geographical Society, the Indian Law Institute, Jinan University, and more than 75 different law schools. His speaking events have been held at such United States law schools as Yale, Columbia, Stanford, University of Chicago, Duke, Berkeley, Georgetown, New York University, Northwestern, Vanderbilt, George Washington University, Boston University, and dozens more.

== Other public activities ==
He also has participated three times in the Main Event of the World Series of Poker at the Rio in Las Vegas, Nevada.

Kunich is a member of the Church of Jesus Christ of Latter-day Saints. He was a contributing author of the controversial book New Approaches to the Book of Mormon: Explorations in Critical Methodology. Drawing upon his biological science background, he submitted an essay on population projections in the Book of Mormon.
