= B. H. Roberts =

American Mormon politician (1857–1933)

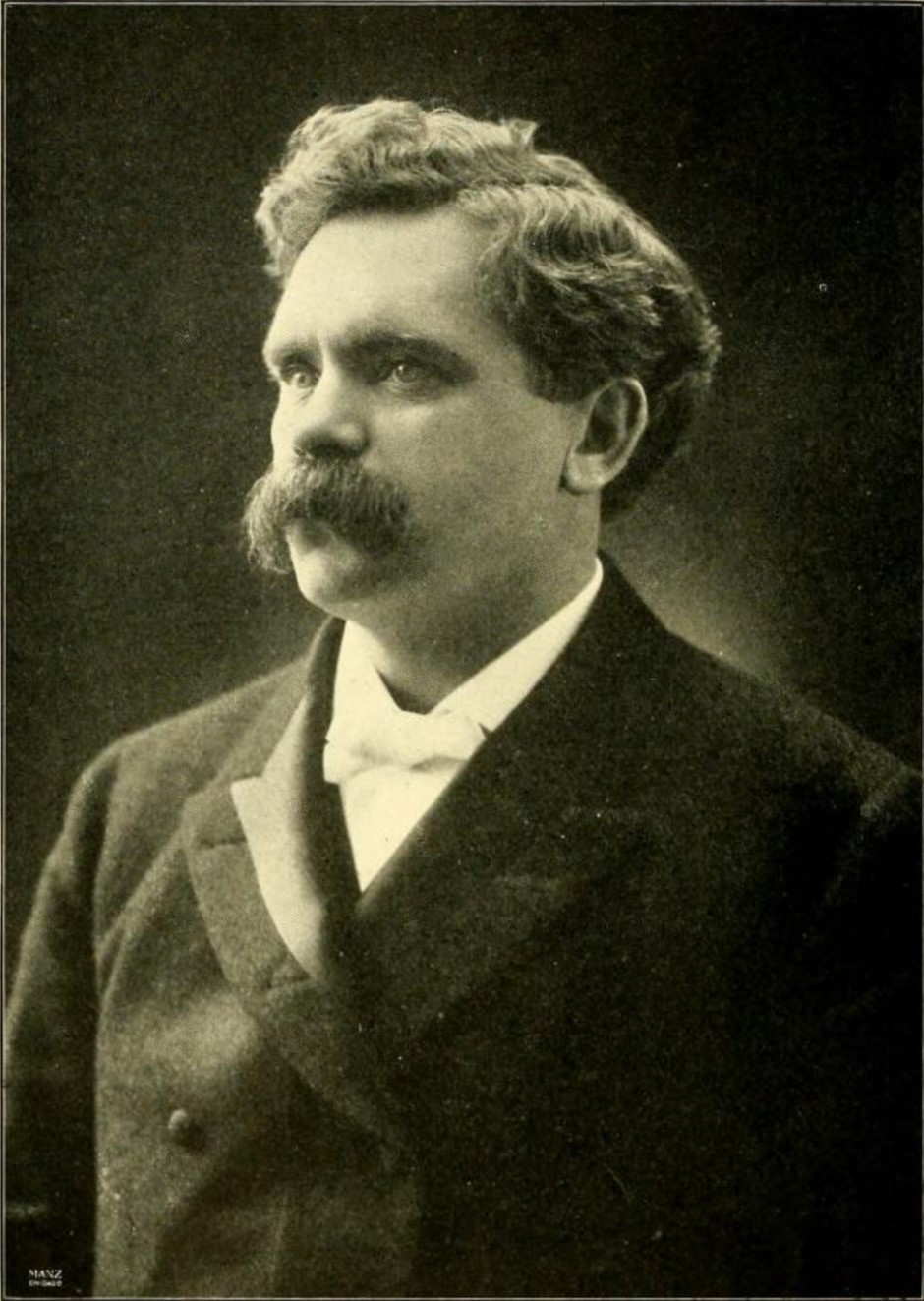

First Council of the Seventy
- In office October 7, 1888 – September 27, 1933
- President: John Taylor

Member-elect of the U.S. House of Representatives from Utah's at-large district
- Seat refused March 4, 1899 – April 2, 1900
- Preceded by: William H. King
- Succeeded by: William H. King

Personal details
- Born: Brigham Henry Roberts; March 13, 1857 Warrington, England
- Died: September 27, 1933 (aged 76) Salt Lake City, Utah, U.S.
- Party: Democratic
- Spouses: Sarah Smith (m. 1878) Celia Dibble (m. 1884) Margaret Curtis Shipp (m. 1890)
- Children: 15
- Education: University of Utah (BA)

Brigham Henry Roberts (March 13, 1857 – September 27, 1933) was a historian, politician, and leader in the Church of Jesus Christ of Latter-day Saints (LDS Church). He edited the seven-volume History of the Church of Jesus Christ of Latter-day Saints and independently wrote the six-volume Comprehensive History of the Church of Jesus Christ of Latter-day Saints. Roberts also wrote Studies of the Book of Mormon—published posthumously—which discussed the validity of the Book of Mormon as an ancient record. Roberts was denied a seat as a member of United States Congress because of his practice of polygamy.

== Early life ==
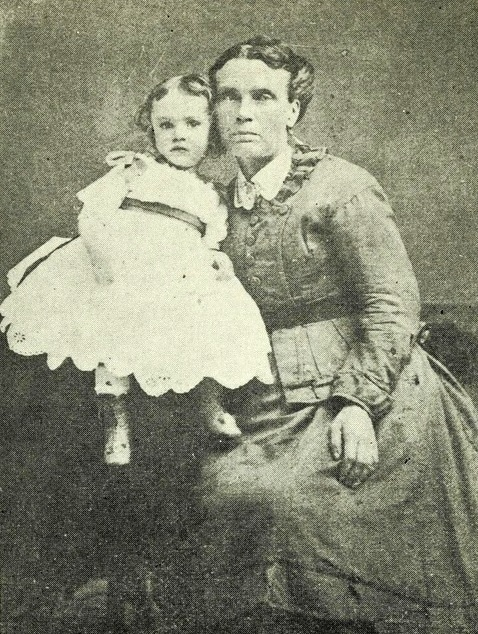
His mother, Ann Everington Roberts

Roberts was born in Warrington, Lancashire, England, the son of Benjamin Roberts, an alcoholic blacksmith and ship plater, and Ann Everington, a seamstress. In the year of his birth, both parents converted to the LDS Church. Benjamin Roberts then abandoned his family. Roberts later wrote, "My childhood was a nightmare; my boyhood a tragedy."

Assisted by the Perpetual Emigrating Fund, B. H. Roberts and a sister left England in April 1866. In Nebraska, they joined a wagon train and proceeded to walk—for much of the way barefoot—to Salt Lake City, where they were met by their mother, who had preceded them. In 1867, Roberts was baptized into the LDS Church by Seth Dustin, who two years later became his stepfather. Dustin eventually deserted his family, and "after several reappearances, he finally disappeared completely." Ann Dustin was granted a divorce in 1884. Upon coming to Utah Territory, Roberts settled in Bountiful, which he always from then on considered his home.

Roberts became a miner and participated in the gambling and drinking typical of that time and place. He was once disciplined by a Salt Lake bishop, who warned him that alcohol "would not only beat him to his knees but to his elbows and chin." But Roberts eventually learned to read, and, after a series of menial jobs, was apprenticed to a blacksmith while attending school. He then became a "voracious reader, devouring books of history, science, philosophy," especially the Book of Mormon and other Mormon religious texts. In 1878, Roberts married Sarah Louisa Smith, and, in the same year, he graduated first in his class from University of Deseret, the normal school precursor of the University of Utah. He and Sarah eventually had seven children.

== Church service ==
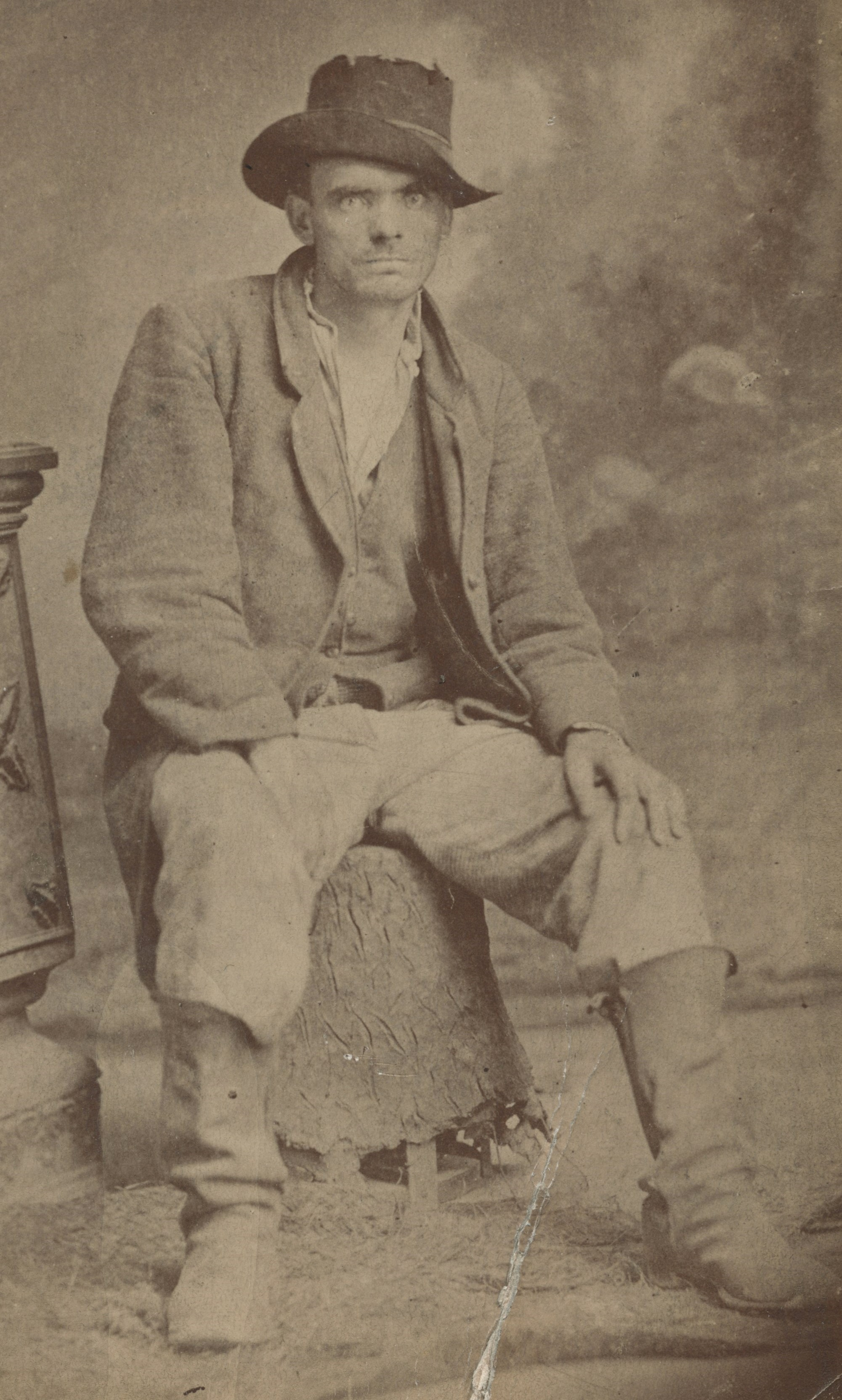
B. H. Roberts disguised as a tramp, to recover bodies of slain missionaries in hostile territory.

After graduation (and the birth of his first child) Roberts was ordained a seventy in his local church branch and taught school to support his family. The LDS Church sent him on a mission to Iowa and Nebraska, "but because the cold weather was hard on his health, he was transferred to Tennessee in December of 1880." There he rose to prominence as the president of the Tennessee Conference of the Southern States Mission.

Celia Dibble Roberts, one of his three wives

On August 10, 1884, a mob in the small community of Cane Creek murdered two Mormon missionaries and two members of the Mormon congregation, with one member of the mob being killed. This attack is known as the Cane Creek Massacre. At some personal risk, Roberts disguised himself as a tramp and recovered the bodies of the two missionaries for their families in Utah Territory.

During a brief return to Utah, Roberts took a second wife, Celia Dibble, by whom he had eight children. From 1889 to 1894, Celia was exiled in Manassa, Colorado, to protect her husband from prosecution for unlawful cohabitation.

In December 1886, while serving as associate editor of the Salt Lake Herald, Roberts was arrested on the charge of unlawful cohabitation. He posted bond to appear in court the next day and that night left on a mission to England.

In England, Roberts served as assistant editor of the LDS Church publication the Millennial Star and completed his first book, the much reprinted The Gospel: An Exposition of Its First Principles (1888).

Returning to Salt Lake City in 1888, as full-time editor of The Contributor, he was chosen as one of the seven presidents of the First Council of the Seventy, the third-highest governing body in the LDS Church. "Tiring of evading federal authorities," Roberts surrendered in April 1889 and pleaded guilty to the charge of unlawful cohabitation. He was imprisoned in the Utah Territorial Prison for five months. Following his release, he moved his families to Colorado and married a third wife, Dr. Margaret Curtis Shipp, after church president Wilford Woodruff issued the 1890 Manifesto that prohibited solemnization of new plural marriages. (Roberts's third wife was seven years his senior and had obtained a degree in obstetrics. Roberts seemed to prefer Margaret's company, "and this created some trouble" with his other families—although Roberts continued to have children by his other wives. Roberts and Margaret had no children.) Roberts was pardoned in 1894 by U.S. President Grover Cleveland. He resigned as an editor of the Salt Lake Herald in 1896, giving his reason that the position that the paper had taken on the recent "Manifesto" was apt to place him in a false light.

== Political and military career ==
Roberts came into conflict with church leaders over his Democratic politics.

During the transitional period following 1890, the LDS Church disbanded its People's Party and encouraged its membership to align with nationally organized Democrat and Republican parties instead. Roberts became a fervent Democrat and was elected Davis County Delegate to the Utah State Constitutional Convention in 1894. Roberts proved a vocal member of the Convention, particularly in his opposition to women's suffrage.

In November 1895, with statehood imminent, Roberts was the Democratic candidate for US Representative at-large from Utah. He lost to Republican Clarence Emir Allen by 47.5% to 49.7%. Roberts believed LDS Church leaders, who were predominantly Republicans, "had unfairly influenced the election by publicly reprimanding him and fellow Democrat Moses Thatcher for running for office without express permission of the Church."

The LDS Church then issued the "Political Manifesto of 1895," which forbade church officers from running for public office without the approval of the Church. Both Roberts and Thatcher refused to agree to the Political Manifesto and were suspended from their ecclesiastical offices. Roberts, believing such a requirement was a basic infringement of his civil rights, capitulated just hours before the deadline of March 24, 1896. He signed the manifesto, wrote a letter of apology to the First Presidency, and was reinstated. Thatcher was more stubborn: he refused to sign, was expelled from the Quorum of the Twelve Apostles and barely evaded excommunication.

In 1898, Roberts was again Democrat candidate for US Representative, and won the election. But the House of Representatives refused to seat him because of his practice of polygamy. A prolonged and unsuccessful battle to take his seat ensued, which left Roberts bitter.

Roberts in uniform as a chaplain

Roberts had been a chaplain in the Utah National Guard. In 1917, when the United States declared war on Germany, Roberts volunteered to serve as a U.S. Army chaplain. The age limit of forty was waived—Roberts was then sixty—and Roberts became chaplain to the 145th Field Artillery, which arrived in France in September 1918, but did not see action before the Armistice of 11 November ended the war.

== Career as a writer ==
Roberts wrote two biographies, a novel, eight historical narratives and compilations, and another dozen books about Mormon theology. In the late 1890s, he also helped establish the Improvement Era and became the de facto editor of this official periodical of the LDS Church. Roberts's six-volume History of the Church of Jesus Christ of Latter-day Saints: Period I, History of Joseph Smith, the Prophet by Himself featured "critical notes, new documents, sidebar headings for most paragraphs, and extensive interpretive essays that introduced each volume. Unfortunately, Roberts continued the confusing structure of the original, where various documents were spliced together and inaccurately attributed to Joseph Smith." Roberts served as Assistant Church Historian from 1902 until his death in 1933.

Roberts wrote a novel Corianton (1889), published serially in The Contributor, and based on the story of Corianton, the son of Alma as told in the Book of Mormon. Though melodramatic and overly didactic, the novel has also been regarded as providing deep and useful portrayals of some of the characters. It was later adapted, along with A Ship of Hagoth by Julia MacDonald, into a play by Orestes Utah Bean, and was the inspiration for the 1931 film Corianton: A Story of Unholy Love.

Roberts's most important work was a comprehensive treatment of Mormon history, which he began in 1909 as a series of monthly articles for a non-Mormon magazine. Roberts repeatedly (and for many years, unsuccessfully) asked church leaders to republish the articles as a multi-volume set. Finally, in 1930 the church agreed to publish it during its centennial celebration. The six-volume Comprehensive History of the Church of Jesus Christ of Latter-day Saints: Century I (3,459 pages) covered for the first time many late-19th- and early-20th-century developments. Further, although its viewpoint was "unabashedly Mormon", Roberts "disdained ... faith promoting myths" and "was a partisan, not an unquestioning apologist."

Roberts "frequently took a broader view" of the place of the LDS Church "in the heavenly scheme of things than did some of his colleagues. In 1902 he told the Saints that 'while the Church of Jesus Christ of Latter-day Saints is given a prominent part in this great drama of the last days, it is not the only force nor the only means that the Lord has employed to bring to pass those things of which His prophets in ancient times have testified.'" Roberts' theology included belief in "the modern liberal doctrine of man and the optimism of the nineteenth century, and it required a bold, rebellious and spacious mind to grasp its full implication."

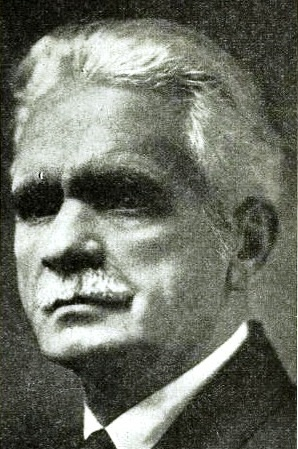
B. H. Roberts late in life during the period of his dispute with Joseph Fielding Smith

Roberts hoped that the church would publish his most elaborate theological treatise, "The Truth, The Way, The Life", but his attempt to use contemporary scientific theory to bolster Mormon doctrine led, in 1930, to a conflict with Mormon apostle Joseph Fielding Smith, who had been influenced by the writings of young Earth creationist George McCready Price. Smith publicly opposed Roberts's quasi-evolutionary views in deference to a literal reading of both the Bible and the Latter-day Saint scriptures. The controversy was debated before the Quorum of the Twelve Apostles, and it "declared a draw: Neither the existence nor the nonexistence of pre-Adamites would constitute church doctrine." "The Truth, The Way, The Life" was not published until 1994.

== Studies of the Book of Mormon ==
Although Roberts continued to testify to the truth of the Book of Mormon, a foundational religious text in Mormonism, he also wrote three studies, unpublished until 1985, that wrestled with Book of Mormon problems. The first, "Book of Mormon Difficulties: A Study," was a 141-page manuscript written in response to a series of questions by an inquirer, referred to Roberts by church president Heber J. Grant. When Roberts confessed that he had no answer for some of the difficulties, and the General Authorities chose to ignore them, Roberts produced "A Book of Mormon Study," a treatise of more than 400 pages. In this work he compared the Book of Mormon to the View of the Hebrews (1823), written by Ethan Smith, which argued Native Americans were descendants of the Ten Lost Tribes of Israel. Roberts found significant similarities between the two books. Finally, Roberts wrote "A Parallel," a condensed version of his larger study, which demonstrated eighteen points of similarity between the two books, and in which he reflected that the imaginative Joseph Smith might have written the Book of Mormon without divine assistance.

Mormon historians have debated whether the manuscript reflects Roberts's doubts or was a case of his playing the devil's advocate. When he presented "A Book of Mormon Study" to church leaders, he emphasized that he was "taking the position that our faith is not only unshaken but unshakable in the Book of Mormon, and therefore we can look without fear upon all that can be said against it." However, Roberts withheld some of his materials from the general authorities.

Roberts asserted that the authenticity of the Restoration must "stand or fall" on the truth of Joseph Smith's claim that the Book of Mormon was the history of an ancient people inscribed on a cache of gold plates; Roberts predicted that if church leaders did not address the historical problems of church origins and possible anachronisms in the Book of Mormon, these problems would eventually undermine "the faith of the Youth of the Church."

Roberts continued to affirm his faith in the divine origins of the Book of Mormon until his death in 1933; but as Terryl Givens has written, "a lively debate has emerged over whether his personal conviction really remained intact in the aftermath of his academic investigations." According to Richard and Joan Ostling, when Roberts's study became better known, especially after its publication by the University of Illinois Press in 1985, Mormon apologists "went into high gear" and "churned out responses" because "Roberts could not be dismissed as an outsider or an anti-Mormon."

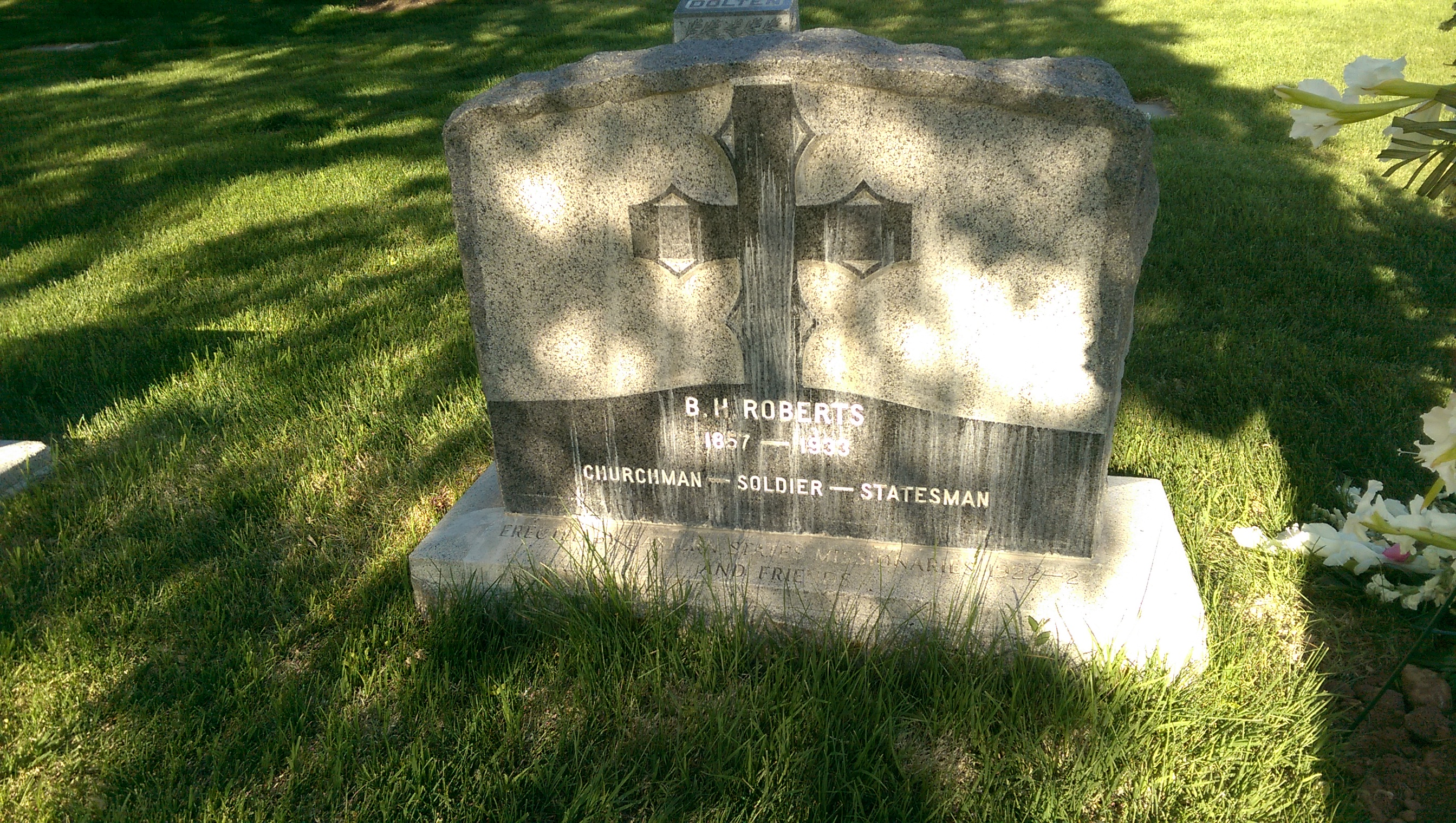
B.H. Roberts' headstone in the Centerville City Cemetery

== Later years ==
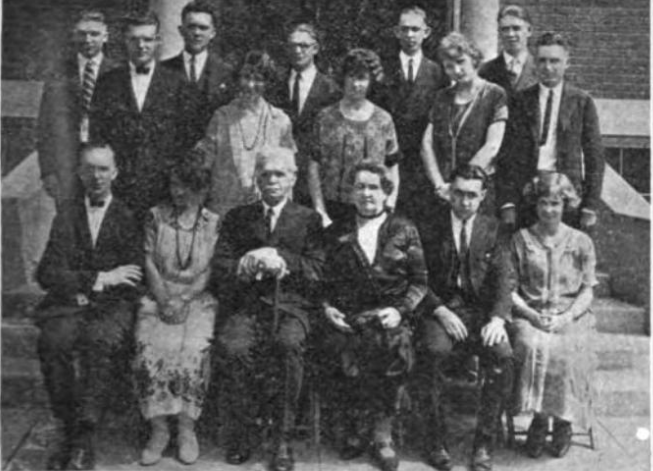
B.H. Roberts (front row third from the left) in the Eastern States Mission

From 1922 to 1927, Roberts was appointed president of the Eastern States Mission, and there he created an innovative "mission school" to teach Mormon missionaries the most effective ways to proselytize. Roberts also served for many years as a leader of the church's Young Men's Mutual Improvement Association. In 1923, Roberts, suffering from diabetes, collapsed at a conference "commemorating the Centennial anniversary of the revealed existence of the Book of Mormon." He was treated with the relatively new drug insulin. A year after the death of his third wife, his companion in New York, Roberts returned to Utah; he was senior president of the First Council of Seventy from 1924 to his death. Roberts died on September 27, 1933, from complications of diabetes. He was survived by thirteen children and by his second wife.

Regardless of his ultimate religious beliefs, most scholars would accept the judgment of Brigham Madsen that Roberts possessed a "deeply embedded integrity, and above all ... fearless willingness to follow wherever his reason led him. He could be abrasive in his defense of stubbornly held beliefs, but he had the capacity to change his views when confronted with new and persuasive evidence." To Leonard J. Arrington, Roberts was "the intellectual leader of the Mormon people in the era of Mormonism's finest intellectual attainment."

== Views on race ==
In his 1907 five-volume book series The Seventy's Course in Theology, Roberts dedicated an entire lesson of the first volume to the "Negro Race Problem", and approvingly quoted a Southern author who said a social divide between white people and black people should be maintained, as socializing would lead to mixed-race marriages, and such race mixing as it would doom the white race. Roberts used racist pseudoscience such as craniology (phrenology) to defend banning Black–White "commingling".

== Published works ==
- Roberts, B. H. (1888). The Gospel: An Exposition of its First Principles. Salt Lake City: The Contributor Company – via Project Gutenberg.
- — (1892). The Life of John Taylor, Third President of the Church of Jesus Christ of Latter-day Saints. Salt Lake City: George Q. Cannon & Sons – via Project Gutenberg.
- — (1893). Outlines of Ecclesiastical History. Salt Lake City: George Q. Cannon & Sons – via Project Gutenberg.
- — (1894). Succession in the Presidency of the Church of Jesus Christ of Latter-day Saints. Salt Lake City: Deseret News – via Project Gutenberg.
- — (1895). New Witnesses for God. Salt Lake City: George Q. Cannon & Sons – via Project Gutenberg.
- — (1900). The Missouri Persecutions. Salt Lake City: George Q. Cannon & Sons – via Project Gutenberg.
- — (1900). The Rise and Fall of Nauvoo. Salt Lake City: Deseret News – via Project Gutenberg.
- — (1902). Corianton: a Nephite story. Salt Lake City: s.n. – via Project Gutenberg.
- —; Smith, Joseph (1902–1932). History of the Church of Jesus Christ of Latter-day Saints. Salt Lake City: Deseret News – via Project Gutenberg.
- — (1903). New Witnesses for God. Volume II. The Book of Mormon. Salt Lake City: Deseret News – via Project Gutenberg.
- — (1903). The Mormon Doctrine of Deity: the Roberts-Van der Donckt Discussion. Salt Lake City: Deseret News – via Project Gutenberg.
- — (1907–1912). The Seventy's Course in Theology (5 volumes). Salt Lake City: Deseret News – via Project Gutenberg.
- — (1907–1912). Defense of the Faith and the Saints (2 volumes). Salt Lake City: Deseret News – via Project Gutenberg.
- — (1908). Joseph Smith, the Prophet-Teacher: A Discourse. Salt Lake City: Deseret News – via Project Gutenberg.
- — (1909). New Witnesses for God: Part III. The Evidences of the Truth of the Book of Mormon. Salt Lake City: Deseret News – via Project Gutenberg.
- — (1916). The Church as an Organization for Social Service. Salt Lake City: General Board of the Y.M.M.I.A.
- — (1919). The Mormon Battalion; its History and Achievements. Salt Lake City: Deseret News – via Project Gutenberg.
- — (1930). Comprehensive History of the Church of Jesus Christ of Latter-day Saints: Century I (6 volumes). Salt Lake City: LDS Church.
- — (1931). The "Falling Away"; or, The World's Loss of the Christian Religion and Church. Salt Lake City: Deseret Book.
- — (1932). Rasha—the Jew; a Message to All Jews. Salt Lake City: Deseret News.
- — (1948). Discourses of B.H. Roberts of the First Council of the Seventy. Salt Lake City: Deseret Book.
- —; Madsen, Brigham D. (1985). Studies of the Book of Mormon. Urbana: University of Illinois Press.
- —; Bergera, Gary James (1990). The Autobiography of B. H. Roberts. Salt Lake City: Signature Books.
- —; Larson, Stan (1994). The Truth, the Way, the Life. San Francisco: Smith Research Associates.
- —; Madsen, Brigham D. (1999). The Essential B.H. Roberts. Salt Lake City: Signature Books.
- —; Sillito, John R. (2004). History's Apprentice: the Diaries of B.H. Roberts, 1880–1898. Salt Lake City: Signature Books.

== See also ==
- Mormon views on evolution
- Unseated members of the United States Congress
- List of United States representatives-elect who never took their seats
- List of United States representatives expelled, censured, or reprimanded

== Notes ==
U.S. House of Representatives
Preceded by William H. King	Member-elect of the U.S. House of Representatives from Utah's at-large congressional district 1898	Succeeded by William H. King
