= Stan Larson =

American author, researcher, and librarian

Stan Larson (born February 26, 1946) is an American author, researcher, and librarian.

== Biography ==
Larson was born in Tacoma, Washington, and was raised in Boise, Idaho. As a young man, he served as a missionary for the Church of Jesus Christ of Latter-day Saints (LDS Church) in England (he turned down an assignment to Brazil). He received a Bachelor of Arts in history and a Master of Arts in ancient scripture from Brigham Young University (BYU).

Beginning in 1974, Larson was a scripture translation researcher and guide writer for the LDS Church. He resigned in 1985 and left the LDS Church after he, through his research, lost faith in the Book of Mormon and other scriptural writings of Joseph Smith.

After leaving the employment of the LDS Church, he worked as a religious archives specialist at the Marriott Library of the University of Utah. In 1988, he received a master's degree in library and information sciences from BYU. He later earned a PhD in theology from the University of Birmingham. In 2001, he became an associate librarian and curator of manuscripts at the Marriott Library. He retired from this position in 2011.

Larson wrote and edited several books and has published articles in BYU Studies, Dialogue, Ensign, Evangelical Quarterly, Journal of Mormon History, Sunstone, and Trinity Journal.

== Works ==
- Stan Larson and Lorille Horne Miller. Unitarianism in Utah: A Gentile Religion in Salt Lake City, 1891–1991 (1991, Freethinker Press)
- Stan Larson. Quest for the Gold Plates: Thomas Stuart Ferguson's Archaeological Search for the Book of Mormon (1997, Signature Books, ISBN 978-0963473264)
- Clawson, Rudger (1993a). Larson, Stan (ed.). A Ministry of Meetings: The Apostolic Diaries of Rudger Clawson. Salt Lake City: Signature Books. ISBN 0-941214-96-6. OCLC 25317571.
- —— (1993b). Larson, Stan (ed.). Prisoner for Polygamy: The Memoirs and Letters of Rudger Clawson at the Utah Territorial Penitentiary, 1884-87. Urbana: University of Illinois Press. ISBN 0-252-01861-3. OCLC 23731930.
- McKay, David O. (1999). Stan Larson and Patricia Larson. (ed.). What E'er Thou Art Act Well Thy Part: The Mission Diaries of David O. McKay. Blue Ribbon Books.
- Poll, Richard D. (1999). Larson, Stan (ed.). Working the Divine Miracle: The Life of Apostle Henry D. Moyle. Salt Lake City: Signature Books. ISBN 1-56085-129-5.
