= D. Michael Quinn =

American historian (1944–2021)

- Born: Dennis Michael Quinn; March 26, 1944; Pasadena, California, U.S.
- Died: April 21, 2021 (aged 77); Rancho Cucamonga, California, U.S.
- Education: Brigham Young University (BA); University of Utah (MA); Yale University (PhD)
- Occupation: Author
- Known for: Mormon scholar; Member of the September Six

Dennis Michael Quinn (March 26, 1944 – April 21, 2021) was an American historian who focused on the history of The Church of Jesus Christ of Latter-day Saints (LDS Church). He was a professor at Brigham Young University (BYU) from 1976 until he resigned in 1988. At the time, his work concerned church involvement with plural marriage after the 1890 Manifesto, when new polygamous marriages were officially prohibited. He was excommunicated from the church as one of the September Six and afterwards was openly gay. Quinn nevertheless identified as a Latter-day Saint and continued to believe in many LDS teachings, though he did not actively practice the faith.

== Early life ==
Quinn was born in Pasadena, California, and grew up in adjacent Glendale. He wanted to be a medical doctor and in preparation became a nursing aide at his local hospital during his senior year in high school, with a full load of patients. In college, however, he failed his pre-med program and so changed majors to English and philosophy.

== Church and military service ==
Quinn served a mission for the LDS Church for two years in England under Marion D. Hanks. Quinn graduated with a BA in English literature from BYU. After he graduated, Quinn served for three years in the US Army during the Vietnam War, with eighteen months of training as a military intelligence agent followed by eighteen months in Munich, Germany. During his military service, he was first accepted into Duke University for graduate studies in English but after he left the Army, he realized that he preferred his hobby of studying history over other subjects. Instead he enrolled at the University of Utah, graduating with a master's degree in history.

Quinn applied for a graduate program in history in Yale Graduate School where he graduated with a PhD degree in 1976. After graduation, he took a job teaching and researching history at BYU. He also worked as a research assistant to Church Historian Leonard J. Arrington for eighteen months. Quinn taught at BYU until he resigned in January 1988 due to the ongoing pressure from some authorities who wanted to see him leave. At BYU, he was named "best professor" by one graduating class.

== Excommunication and later life ==
On September 26, 1993, Quinn was excommunicated from the LDS Church as one of the September Six. Quinn had been summoned to a disciplinary council to answer charges of "conduct unbecoming a member of the Church and apostasy," including "'very sensitive and highly confidential' matters that were not related to Michael's historical writings." Lavina Fielding Anderson has suggested that the "allusion to Michael's sexual orientation, which Michael had not yet made public, was unmistakable." Quinn did not attend the disciplinary council that resulted in his excommunication.

Quinn afterwards published several major studies of the LDS Church hierarchy, including his three-volume work of The Mormon Hierarchy: Origins of Power, The Mormon Hierarchy: Extensions of Power, and The Mormon Hierarchy: Wealth and Corporate Power. He also authored the 1996 book Same-Sex Dynamics Among Nineteenth-Century Americans: A Mormon Example, which argues that homosexuality was common among early Mormons and was not seen as a serious sin or transgression.

Despite his excommunication and critical writings, Quinn still considered himself a Latter-day Saint and believed in Mormonism, though he disagreed with certain policies and doctrines. The Salt Lake Tribune said he had "the most literal faith" of any member of the September Six and believed in "angelic visits, miracles, divine intervention, gold plates, [and] Christ in America."

In an April 2006 article for the Wall Street Journal, reporter Daniel Golden wrote that Quinn could no longer be hired because almost all the funding for professorships in Mormon studies comes from Mormon donors. For example, Arizona State University administrators vetoed the department of religious studies in its recommendation to hire Quinn. Its faculty believed that officials feared alienating the 3,700 Mormon students and offending Ira A. Fulton, a powerful Mormon donor who, according to Golden, has called Quinn a "nothing person."

In 2007, Quinn was interviewed in the PBS documentary The Mormons.

Quinn died on an unknown date between April 10–21, 2021 in Rancho Cucamonga, California.

== Writings on Mormonism ==
Quinn's research topics, both before and after his excommunication, were in-depth revisions of traditional accounts of Mormon history that were grounded in primary source material. The Mormon History Association has recognized his writings as "foundational to the field" of Mormon studies. Three of his most influential books, which also generated intense controversy, are Early Mormonism and the Magic World View, The Mormon Hierarchy: Origins of Power, and The Mormon Hierarchy: Extensions of Power.

=== Early Mormonism and the Magic World View ===
Early Mormonism and the Magic World View is an exhaustive recounting of the role of 19th-century New England folk magic lore in Joseph Smith's early visions and in the development of the Book of Mormon. Quinn argues that Smith's early religious experiences were inextricably intermingled with ritual, supernaturalism, and white magic. Evidence is drawn from friendly firsthand sources, unfriendly firsthand sources, material artifacts, and parallels in ideas. All four sources agree that Smith used a collection of different seer stones in searching for buried treasure supposedly left by pirates, Spaniards, and Native Americans. The evidence suggests that these same seer stones were one of the primary tools used by Smith in translating the Book of Mormon. Likewise, evidence from all four categories of sources supports the idea that Smith approved of the use of rods for dowsing activities. In support of this, Quinn points out that the first published version of an early revelation told Oliver Cowdery that a dowsing rod (referred to as a "rod of nature") would serve as a means of receiving divine revelation. Other claims, including Smith's purported involvement in astrology are less supported by evidence.

Various historians, both within and without the Mormon faith, consider this book an important contribution in understanding early Mormon history, and supporters feel the work is groundbreaking. In a 1990 book review in Church History, Klaus J. Hansen calls Quinn's book a "magisterial study" and a "tour de force" and notes the book's "truly stunning mass of evidence" in favor of its position. John L. Brooke made Quinn's argument the starting point of his study, The Refiner's Fire: The Making of Mormon Cosmology, 1644–1844.

Mormon and non-Mormon scholars have criticized the book as relying too heavily on environmental parallels without a proven connection to Smith's ideas and behavior; that it accepts at face value the disputed Howe–Hurlbut affidavits about Smith's reputation and behavior in New York and a late 19th-century newspaper account of a money-digging agreement involving Smith and his father. William J. Hamblin states in his review of the book that "the fact that Quinn could not discover a single primary source written by Latter-day Saints that makes any positive statement about magic is hardly dissuasive to a historian of Quinn's inventive capacity". An additional criticism suggests that the concept of magic is flawed and inherently subjective; it implies that Smith's use of seer stones and dowsing rods was superstitious or fraudulent rather than divine. However, some of Quinn's critics acknowledge that the book is "richly documented" and an obligatory starting point for any discussion of Smith's involvement in 19th-century folkloric practices.

=== The Mormon Hierarchy ===
The three volumes of The Mormon Hierarchy provide a comprehensive secular organizational history of the LDS Church from its founding to modern times, and its influence on current Mormon culture and doctrine. The work emphasizes conflict, coercion, and violence, especially during the 19th century (see Danites, Mountain Meadows massacre, Blood Atonement and the Mormon wars). Quinn asserts the view that during the 20th century the church was increasingly bureaucratized and highlights its role in right-wing anti-communism during the 1950s and the 1960s, efforts against the Equal Rights Amendment in the 1970s, political work against same-sex marriage and some forms of anti-discrimination legislation, the church's mid-century financial crisis, conflicts over policies such as the so-called "baseball baptisms" of youth who knew little about the church, presumed disagreements among church apostles, and extensive business and family interrelationships among leaders.

In a review of The Mormon Hierarchy: Extensions of Power for the Foundation for Ancient Research and Mormon Studies, a Mormon research organization, Duane Boyce states that there are scholarly deficiencies in the work and refers to it as a "betrayal of trust."

In 2012, Quinn was reported to be working on a book about LDS Church finances and businesses. He said, "The Mormon Church is very different than any other church....Traditional Christianity and Judaism make a clear distinction between what is spiritual and what is temporal, while Mormon theology specifically denies that there is such a distinction." Regarding management of the church's considerable investments, Quinn said, "Several high-ranking church insiders told him that the church's finances are so compartmentalized that no single person, not even the president, knows the entirety of its holdings."

The resulting book was released in 2017 as the third volume in his Mormon Hierarchy series, Mormon Hierarchy: Wealth and Corporate Power. In an interview about this book with the Salt Lake Tribune's podcast Mormon Land, Michael Quinn spoke of the financial structure of the LDS Church as "faith promoting" and "stunning." He finished the 50 minute interview by saying, "There is no comparison to the volunteerism of the highest officers of the LDS Church compared to the highest officers of any non-profit you can look at."

=== Same-Sex Dynamics Among Nineteenth-Century Americans: A Mormon Example ===
Quinn has argued that homosexual relationships, between both men and women, were quietly accepted by the LDS Church and its leadership up until the 1940s. This theme has arisen in Quinn's The Mormon Hierarchy: Extensions of Power and is the central topic of Same-Sex Dynamics Among Nineteenth-Century Americans: A Mormon Example. Two Mormon scholars have disputed Quinn's work, calling it a distortion of church history; these writers claim that Quinn completely misrepresented the facts and deny any acceptance of homosexuality from previous leaders. They suggest that Quinn has conflated an absence of early church proscriptions of homosexuality with tacit acceptance of same, and state that the current leadership of the church "is entirely consistent with the teachings of past leaders and with the scriptures."

== Selected works ==
Quinn has edited a prominent collection of major publications in Mormon history over the last 40 years, The New Mormon History: Revisionist Essays on the Past. He has written and spoken of the parallels between 19th-century American attacks on Mormon polygamy and 20th- and 21st-century Mormon attacks on same-sex marriage. He has also presented an overview of recent biographies of Joseph Smith, suggesting that these biographies maintain an artificial division between Smith the treasure seeker and Smith the prophet.

Quinn was also a noteworthy biographer of the mid-20th-century Latter-day Saint leader J. Reuben Clark, Jr. In two biographical volumes on the Mormon apostle, Quinn emphasized Clark's professional preeminence, his committed and sometimes inflexible leadership, his persistent pacifism and personal struggles.

After Quinn's death his children found his unpublished memoir at his home, the "Chosen Path" and they found a publisher that published it in 2023.

=== Bibliography ===
- Quinn, D. Michael (1983). J. Reuben Clark, The Church Years. Provo, Utah: Brigham Young University Press. ISBN 0-8425-2137-2.
- —— (Spring 1985). "LDS Church Authority and New Plural Marriages, 1890–1904". Dialogue: A Journal of Mormon Thought. 18 (1): 9–105. doi:10.2307/45225323. JSTOR 45225323. S2CID 259871046.
- —— (1987). Early Mormonism and the Magic World View. Salt Lake City, Utah: Signature Books. ISBN 0-941214-46-X.
- —— (1992). The New Mormon History: Revisionist Essays on the Past. Salt Lake City: Signature Books. ISBN 1-56085-011-6. Archived from the original on October 19, 2008.
- —— (1992). "On Being a Mormon Historian (and Its Aftermath)". In Smith, George D. (ed.). Faithful History: Essays on Writing Mormon History. Salt Lake City: Signature Books. ISBN 1-56085-007-8. LCCN 91021222. OCLC 23941120.
- —— (1994). The Mormon Hierarchy: Origins of Power. Salt Lake City: Signature Books. ISBN 1-56085-056-6.
- —— (1996). Same-Sex Dynamics Among Nineteenth-Century Americans: A Mormon Example. Urbana and Chicago: University of Illinois Press. p. 506. ISBN 0-252-06958-7.
- —— (1997). The Mormon Hierarchy: Extensions of Power. Salt Lake City: Signature Books. ISBN 1-56085-060-4. Archived from the original on October 29, 2005.
- —— (1998). Early Mormonism and the Magic World View (Revised and Enlarged ed.). Salt Lake City: Signature Books. ISBN 1-56085-089-2. Archived from the original on December 18, 2008.
- —— (2002). Elder Statesman: A Biography of J. Reuben Clark. Salt Lake City: Signature Books. ISBN 1-56085-155-4. Archived from the original on October 29, 2005.
- —— (December 2003). "Apologia Pro Mea Via" (PDF). Sunstone. 28 (5): 25–27.
- —— (2017). The Mormon Hierarchy: Wealth & Corporate Power. Salt Lake City: Signature Books. ISBN 978-1-56085-235-3.
- —— (2023). Chosen Path: A Memoir. Signature Books. ISBN 978-1-56085-451-7.
