= David P. Wright =

David Pearson Wright (born 1953) is an American theologian and the professor of Bible and the Ancient Near East at Brandeis University. He is a scholar in the field of the Hebrew Bible, especially the composition of the Pentateuch and inner-biblical exegesis, as well as Near Eastern and biblical ritual and law in comparative perspective.

Wright earned his doctorate from the University of California, Berkeley and is well known for his work Inventing God's Law: How the Covenant Code of the Bible Used and Revised the Laws of Hammurabi (Oxford University Press, 2009). He is also the author of The Disposal of Impurity: Elimination Rites in the Bible and in Hittite and Mesopotamian Literature (Scholars Press, 1987) and Ritual in Narrative: The Dynamics of Feasting, Mourning, and Retaliation Rites in the Ugaritic Tale of Aqhat (Eisenbrauns, 2001). He is currently working on a commentary on Leviticus in the Hermeneia series (Fortress Press, forthcoming).

Wright was born in Salt Lake City, Utah and was raised as a member of the Church of Jesus Christ of Latter-day Saints. He served a two-year mission for the church in Oregon, graduated from the University of Utah magna cum laude in Middle East Studies. After graduate school, Wright became an assistant professor of Hebrew and Near Eastern Languages in the Department of Asian and Near Eastern Languages at Brigham Young University (BYU) in September 1984. After the publication of New Approaches to the Book of Mormon: Explorations in Critical Methodology in 1994 Wright was fired from BYU and ultimately excommunicated by the church.
