= Janice Merrill Allred =

American writer

Janice Merrill Allred (born in 1947) is an excommunicated Latter Day Saint, theologian, writer, and Mormon feminist. She was born in Mesa, Arizona.

Allred holds a B.A. in English from Brigham Young University (BYU), and some of her writings have been collected in God the Mother, and Other Theological Essays (Signature Books: 1997). She began her studies of the Mother in Heaven concept in 1991. Her writings have been viewed as controversial by leaders of the Church of Jesus Christ of Latter-day Saints (LDS Church); meetings with local leadership regarding her work began in November 1992. In 1993, the LDS Church disciplined six prominent writers; Allred had collaborated with several of these including Lavina Fielding Anderson, Lynne Whitesides (who was president of the Mormon Women's Forum while Allred was vice-president), and brother-in-law Paul Toscano. Allred was in Mexico City at the time, but faced a series of disciplinary councils on her return to Utah. A paper she wrote which was presented at the 1994 Sunstone Symposium was rebutted in late August by then First counselor, Gordon Bitner Hinckley, of the First Presidency (who later became church president Gordon B. Hinckley,) and Allred was initially placed on probation (a temporary and relatively minor punishment) in October 1994. However, after lengthy proceedings, a second disciplinary council found her guilty of apostasy and excommunicated her on May 9, 1995.

In addition to her theological work, Allred has criticized the LDS Church for alleged instances of child abuse.

Allred is married to BYU physicist David Allred, and is the mother of nine children. She is the sister of fellow LDS theologian and excommunicant Margaret Toscano.

== Publications ==
- Allred, Janice (1997). God the Mother, and Other Theological Essays. Signature Books.
- (1997) "My Struggle for a More Loving, Tolerant, and Egalitarian Church". Case Reports of the Mormon Alliance. 2(4)
- (1994) "Toward a Mormon Theology of God the Mother," Dialogue: A Journal of Mormon Thought 27(2):38–39
- (2012) "The One Who Never Left Us," Sunstone
