= September Six =

Six people excommunicated or disfellowshipped by the LDS church

The September Six were six members of the Church of Jesus Christ of Latter-day Saints (LDS Church) who were excommunicated or disfellowshipped by the church in September 1993, allegedly for publishing scholarly work against or criticizing church doctrine or leadership. The term "September Six", coined by The Salt Lake Tribune, was used in the media and in subsequent discussion. The church's action was referred to by some as evidence of an anti-intellectual posture on the part of church leaders.

== Six individuals ==
=== Lynne Kanavel Whitesides ===
Lynne Kanavel Whitesides was a Mormon feminist and was noted for speaking on the Mother in Heaven. Whitesides was the first of the group to experience church discipline and was disfellowshipped September 14, 1993. Though technically still a member, Whitesides stated that she "exploded" out of the church and her marriage in 1993 and considered herself a practitioner of Native American philosophies. She died from pneumonia on July 7, 2025.

=== Avraham Gileadi ===
Avraham Gileadi is a Hebrew scholar and literary analyst, who is considered theologically conservative. Following his 1981 Ph.D. in ancient studies from Brigham Young University, he published a new interpretive translation of the Book of Isaiah in 1988 and a study of its eschatological prophecies in 1991. Mormon scholars, including Hugh Nibley, Truman G. Madsen and Ellis Rasmussen, praised his work, but his argument that the Isaiah prophecies pointed to a human "Davidic king" who would emerge in the Last Days, apart from Jesus Christ, was controversial, and his second book was pulled from the shelves by its publisher, church-owned Deseret Book. The reasons for his excommunication on September 15 are unclear. According to Margaret Toscano (whose husband was among the September Six and who would also later be excommunicated), Gileadi's "books interpreting Mormon scripture challenged the exclusive right of leaders to define doctrine," but Gileadi himself disputes that characterization. In 1996, Gileadi was rebaptized into the church after a second membership council, conducted by his stake president. As with all LDS Church rebaptisms, the original disciplinary action was expunged from the church's records, and is now treated as if it never happened. Gileadi is currently an active member of the church.

=== Paul Toscano ===
Paul Toscano is a Salt Lake City attorney who co-authored, with Margaret Merrill Toscano, a controversial book, Strangers in Paradox: Explorations in Mormon Theology (1990), and in 1992, he co-founded The Mormon Alliance. He later wrote the book The Sanctity of Dissent (1994) and its sequel, The Sacrament of Doubt (2007).

He was excommunicated from the LDS Church on September 19, 1993. The reasons for his excommunication, as reportedly given by church leaders, were apostasy and false teaching. According to Toscano, the actual reason was insubordination in refusing to curb his sharp criticism of Church leaders' preference for legalism, ecclesiastical tyranny, white-washed Mormon history, and hierarchical authoritarianism, which privilege the image of the corporate church above its commitment to its members, to the teachings and the revelations of founder Joseph Smith, and to the gospel of Jesus Christ.

In 2007, Toscano wrote that he lost his faith "like losing your eyesight after an accident." He regrets that church leaders have disregarded his criticisms of what he considers the church's growing anti-intellectualism, homophobia, misogyny, and elitism.

Toscano's wife, Margaret, faced her own disciplinary council for her doctrinal and feminist views and was excommunicated on November 30, 2000. Some view her excommunication as constituting a "seventh" member of the September Six, as she was summoned in 1993, but ecclesiastical focus shifted to her husband. Margaret's discipline was delayed until 2000. Margaret later wrote "The Missing Rib: The Forgotten Place of Queens and Priestesses in the Establishment of Zion" as well as the tenth chapter of Transforming the Faiths of our Fathers: Women who Changed American Religion (2004), edited by Ann Braude.

=== Maxine Hanks ===
Maxine Hanks is a Mormon feminist theologian, who compiled and edited the anthology Women and Authority: Re-emerging Mormon Feminism (1992). She was excommunicated on September 19, along with fellow contributor D. Michael Quinn. In February 2012, Hanks was rebaptized as a member of the church.

=== Lavina Fielding Anderson ===
Lavina Fielding Anderson was a Mormon feminist writer who edited the books Sisters in Spirit: Mormon Women in Historical and Cultural Perspective (1992) and Lucy's Book, an edition of the Lucy Mack Smith narrative. She was a former editor for the Ensign and served as editor for the Journal of Mormon History from 1991 to May 2009. She was excommunicated September 23 for apostasy, allegedly because of her article "The LDS Intellectual Community and Church Leadership: A Contemporary Chronology" in Dialogue: A Journal of Mormon Thought. She also wrote chapter 9, "The Grammar of Inequity" in the book Women and Authority: Re-emerging Mormon Feminism (1992).

Anderson continued to attend LDS Church services as a non-member. She wrote on Mormon issues, including editing the multi-volume Case Reports of the Mormon Alliance, an ongoing collection of interviews with Mormons who believe they were unfairly disciplined by the church. After her husband's death in 2018, Anderson's bishop approached her about reinstatement, the first ecclesiastical leader in the twenty-four years since she was excommunicated to do so. In 2019, her local stake leaders reconvened her disciplinary council, in which she affirmed her faith but also expressed multiple views contrary to church teachings. The council recommended her rebaptism to the First Presidency; this was rejected without explanation, and without reiterating her conditions for reinstatement. Anderson continued to attend weekly church services and published in 2020 a collection of essays regarding inclusiveness and gender inequality in her book Mercy Without End: Toward a More Inclusive Church. She died on October 29, 2023.

=== D. Michael Quinn ===
D. Michael Quinn was a Mormon historian. Among other studies, he documented LDS Church-sanctioned polygamy from 1890 until 1904, after the 1890 Manifesto that officially abandoned the practice. He wrote chapter 17, "Mormon Women Have Had the Priesthood Since 1843" in the book Women and Authority: Re-emerging Mormon Feminism (1992). He was excommunicated September 26.

Quinn was summoned to a disciplinary council to answer charges of "conduct unbecoming a member of the Church and apostasy," including "'very sensitive and highly confidential' matters that were not related to Michael's historical writings." Anderson has suggested that the "allusion to Michael's sexual orientation, which Michael had not yet made public, was unmistakable."

Quinn afterwards published several critical studies of Mormon hierarchy, including his three-volume work of The Mormon Hierarchy: Origins of Power, The Mormon Hierarchy: Extensions of Power, and The Mormon Hierarchy: Wealth and Corporate Power. He also authored the 1996 book Same-Sex Dynamics Among Nineteenth-Century Americans: A Mormon Example, which argues that homosexuality was common among early Mormons and was not seen as a serious sin or transgression. He also authored the 1987 book, Early Mormonism and the Magic World View, which argues that early Mormon leaders were greatly influenced by folk magic and superstitious beliefs including stone looking, charms, and divining rods.

Despite his excommunication and critical writings, Quinn, who was after his excommunication openly gay, still considered himself to be a Latter-day Saint, a stance he maintained until his death in 2021.

== Church measures taken ==
Except for Whitesides, all of the September Six were excommunicated. Whitesides was disfellowshipped, a lesser sanction that does not formally expel one from church membership. To date, three of the September Six have retained or regained church membership: Avraham Gileadi and Maxine Hanks, who were rebaptized, and Lynne Whitesides, who remains a disfellowshipped member.

While the LDS Church sometimes announces that a prominent member has been excommunicated, the default policy is to refuse to publicly discuss details about the reasons for any excommunication, even if details of the proceedings are made public by that person. Other than the summons sent to each of the six (specifying that their behavior was "contrary to the laws and order of the church"), the church is silent on why a member was disciplined. Such disciplinary proceedings are typically undertaken locally, initiated by leaders at the ward or stake level, although at least one of the September Six suggested his excommunication was orchestrated by higher-ranking church leaders.

Procedures pertaining to the organization of these disciplinary councils are found in the church's scriptural Doctrine and Covenants section 102 as well as in its administrative handbook. During the time of the September Six, Handbook 1, which was only available to ecclesiastical leaders, was in use. In 2020, the church publicly published a revised handbook, General Handbook: Serving in the Church of Jesus Christ of Latter-day Saints. The 2020 Handbook changes some language and procedures regarding church discipline.

The LDS Church later excommunicated Janice Merrill Allred in 1995 and Margaret Merrill Toscano in 2000, both of whom had collaborated with several of the September Six and were also involved in disciplinary actions during 1993.

== See also ==
- Criticism of the Church of Jesus Christ of Latter-day Saints
- Jeremy Runnells
- John Dehlin
- Kate Kelly (feminist)
- Sonia Johnson
- Mormonism and history
- Ordain Women
- Strengthening Church Members Committee
