= Orestes U. Bean =

American playwright

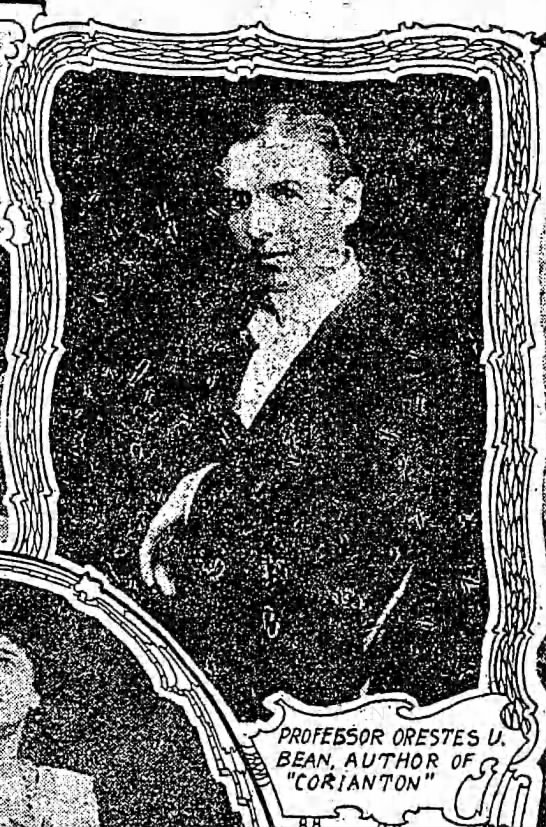
Orestes U. Bean (1902)

Orestes Utah Bean (1873–1937) was an American playwright. Bean was born in Provo, Utah to George Washington Bean. He was a Latter-day Saint.

Bean's major work was the play Corianton: An Aztec Romance based on the novel Corianton by B. H. Roberts and the novel A Ship of Hagoth by Julia A. MacDonald. Starting in 1902 Bean directed and produced the play in Utah. He managed to run it for six performances on Broadway in 1912. He was also closely involved with it being made into a film as Corianton: An Unholy Lovestory although he did not like the result and sued Lester Parks over the matter.

== See also ==
- Harold Orlob
