= The Contributor (LDS magazine) =

The Contributor was an independent publication associated with the Church of Jesus Christ of Latter-day Saints (LDS Church) between 1879 and 1896. It was a monthly periodical and sought to represent the Young Men's and Young Ladies' Mutual Improvement Associations (YMMIA and YLMIA respectively), the youth organizations of the LDS Church at the time. It was founded by Junius F. Wells, the inaugural head of the YMMIA.

Abraham H. Cannon became editor when the magazine was purchased by the Cannon Publishing Company in 1892. With the death of Cannon in July 1896, The Contributor ceased publication a few months later and was not immediately replaced. The Young Woman's Journal had begun publication in 1889 and it replaced The Contributor for the YLMIA in all but name. However, to provide an official replacement for The Contributor that would cater to both young men and young women, the YMMIA and the YLMIA began publication of the Improvement Era in 1897.

== See also ==
- New Era (magazine)
- List of Latter Day Saint periodicals
