= Lavina Fielding Anderson =

American historian

Lavina Fielding Anderson (13 April 1944 – 29 October 2023) was a Latter-day Saint scholar, writer, editor, and feminist. Anderson held a PhD in English from the University of Washington.

Anderson was one of the original trustees of the Mormon Alliance, founded in 1992 to document allegations of spiritual and ecclesiastical abuse in the Church of Jesus Christ of Latter-day Saints (LDS Church). In 1993, Anderson published a chronology documenting over 100 cases of what she regarded as spiritual abuse by LDS Church leaders during the 1970s, 1980s, and early 1990s. This article became grounds for her excommunication on charges of apostasy in September 1993, as one of the September Six.

Anderson remained as active in the LDS Church as her excommunicant status allowed; in 1996, she was described by Levi S. Peterson as exemplary of an emerging "church in exile" composed of faithful excommunicants. In the late 1990s, she published three volumes of Case Reports of the Mormon Alliance co-authored with Janice Allred, documenting sexual and ritual abuse by lay clergy and calling for improvement in the institutional treatment of victims. In 2019, her local stake leaders reconvened her disciplinary council, in which she affirmed her faith but also expressed multiple views contrary to church teachings. The council recommended her rebaptism to the First Presidency; this was rejected without explanation, and without reiterating her conditions for reinstatement. As mentioned below, Mercy Without End contains eighteen of her essays reflecting on her twenty-five years attending church as an excommunicant.

She was married to Paul L. Anderson from 1977 until his death in 2018. She died at home from complications of pulmonary hypertension on October 29, 2023.

== Works edited ==
Her editing credits include Sisters in Spirit: Mormon Women in Historical and Cultural Perspective (1987) and Tending the Garden: Essays on Mormon Literature (1996). She worked as an editor at journals including the Ensign (the official LDS magazine), Dialogue: A Journal of Mormon Thought, Journal of Mormon History, Mormon Women's Forum Quarterly, and Case Reports of the Mormon Alliance. In 2001, Anderson published a critical edition of Lucy Mack Smith's memoir, Lucy's Book: A Critical Edition of Lucy Mack Smith's Family Memoir (Salt Lake City: Signature Books, 2001).

In 1995, Anderson and Eugene England co-edited Tending the Garden: Essays on Mormon Literature (Salt Lake City:Signature Books, 1995).This book-length collection of fifteen essays on Mormon literature discusses such classic narratives as Joseph Smith's first vision and Parley P. Pratt's autobiography, more recent experiments such as Levi Peterson's The Backslider, and Terry Tempest Williams's Refuge; it also addresses the question of what constitutes Mormon aesthetics.

In May of 2020, her collection of essays, Mercy Without End: Toward a More Inclusive Church (Signature Books, 2020) was published, highlighting her concerns about and reflections on issues of inclusiveness in the Church of Jesus Christ of Latter-day Saints.

== Selected works and references ==
- Anderson, Lavina Fielding (Spring 1993). "The LDS intellectual community and church leadership: A contemporary chronology" (PDF). Dialogue: A Journal of Mormon Thought. 26 (1): 7–64. doi:10.2307/45228619. JSTOR 45228619.
- Anderson, Lavina Fielding (Winter 1993). "Freedom of Conscience: A Personal Statement". Dialogue: A Journal of Mormon Thought. 26 (4): 196–202. doi:10.2307/45228714. JSTOR 45228714. Archived from the original on 2011-06-13.
- "A Decade on the Thin Edge" (PDF). Sunstone. 28 (5): 28–31. December 2003.
- Mercy without End: Toward a More Inclusive Church. Salt Lake City, UT: Signature Books. 2020. p. 288. ISBN 978-1560852834.
- Peterson, Levi S (Winter 1996). "Lavina Fielding Anderson and the power of a church in exile". Dialogue: A Journal of Mormon Thought. 29 (4): 169–78. doi:10.2307/45228305. JSTOR 45228305. S2CID 254388159.
- Moloney, Karen Marguerite (Fall 2003). "Saints for all seasons: Lavina Fielding Anderson and Bernard Shaw's Joan of Arc". Dialogue: A Journal of Mormon Thought. 36 (3): 27–39. doi:10.2307/45227105. JSTOR 45227105. S2CID 254397915.
- "Six intellectuals disciplined for apostasy" (PDF). Sunstone. 16 (6): 65–73. November 1993.
- Waterman, Bryan; Kagel, Brian (1998). The Lord's University: Freedom and Authority at BYU. Salt Lake City: Signature Books. pp. 258–301.
- Anderson, Lavina Fielding (2002). "DNA Mormon: D. Michael Quinn". In Sillito, John; Staker, Susan (eds.). Mormon Mavericks: Essays on Dissenters. Salt Lake City: Signature Books. pp. 329–364. ISBN 1560851546. (An article by Anderson about her fellow September Six excommunicant and friend D. Michael Quinn)
- Patterson, Sara M. (2023). "September 23". The September Six and the Struggle for the Soul of Mormonism. Salt Lake City: Signature Books. pp. 237–258. ISBN 9781560854661.
- Shepherd, Gordon; Shepherd, Gary (2021). "The Little Girl Who Loved the Library". Growing up in the City of the Saints. BookBaby. pp. 411–418. ISBN 9781098388928.

== See also ==
- Mormon feminism
