= Demographics of the Church of Jesus Christ of Latter-day Saints =

The demographics of The Church of Jesus Christ of Latter-day Saints include statistical data relating to the church's population and particular groups within it.

The church reports a worldwide membership of 16 million. The church's definition of "membership" includes all persons who were ever baptized, or whose parents were members while the person was under the age of eight (called "members of record"), who have neither been excommunicated nor asked to have their names removed from church records with approximately 8.3 million residing outside the United States, as of December 2011.

According to its statistics, the church is the fourth largest religious body in the United States. Although the church does not publish attendance figures, researchers estimate that attendance at weekly LDS worship services globally is around 4 million. Members living in the U.S. and Canada constitute 46 percent of membership, Latin America 38 percent, and members in the rest of the world 16 percent.

The 2014 Pew Forum on Religion & Public Life survey, conducted by Princeton Survey Research Associates International, found that approximately 2 percent of the U.S. adult population self-identified as a member of the church, a finding that was replicated in its most recent (2023-24) survey. In 2025 however, a study by the Cooperative Election Study found 0.9 percent of the U.S. population to be self-reported LDS/Mormon.

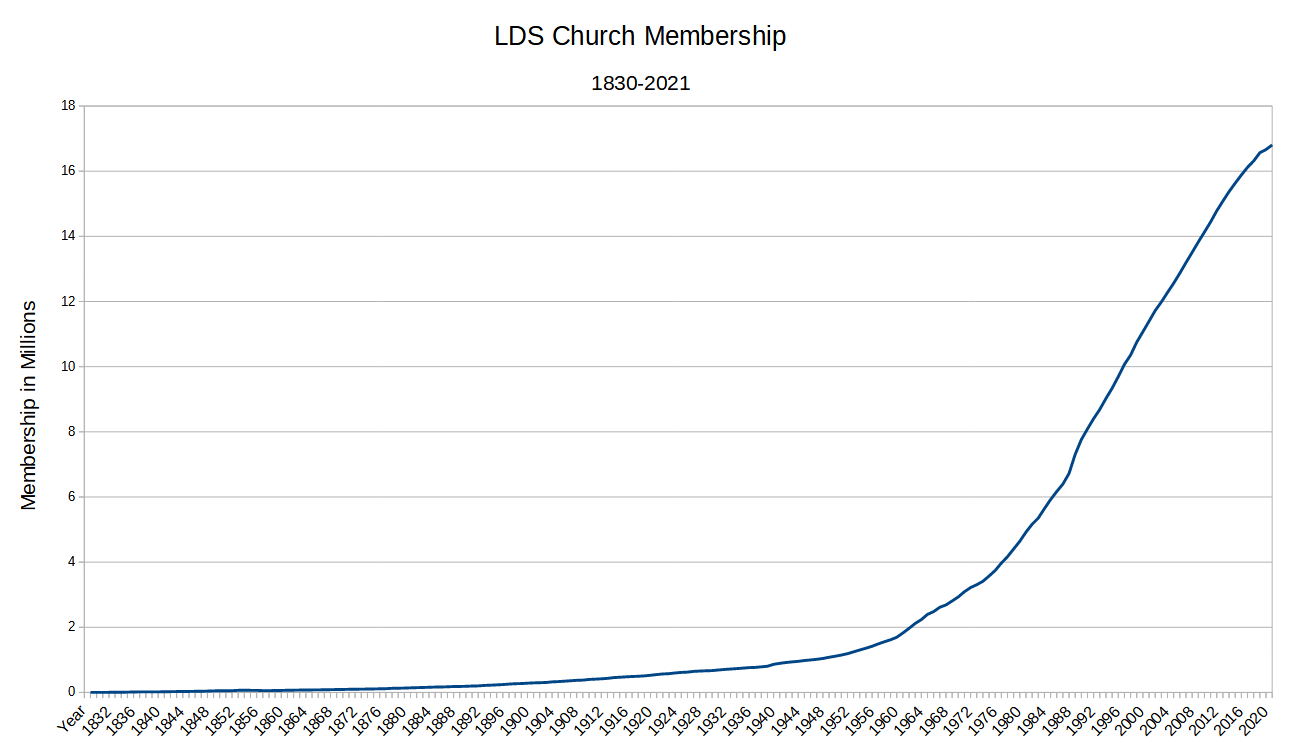
The church saw prodigious numerical growth in the latter half of the 20th century, but the growth has since leveled off.

Membership is concentrated geographically in the Intermountain West, in a specific region sometimes known as the Mormon corridor. Church members and some others from the United States colonized this region in the mid-to-late 1800s, dispossessing several indigenous tribes in the process. LDS Church influence in the area — both cultural and political — is considered strong.

== Membership ==
LDS membership as percentage of population by US states (2021).

LDS membership by US states (2021).

The Church of Jesus Christ of Latter-day Saints (LDS Church) releases membership, congregational, and related information on a regular basis. The latest membership information LDS Church releases includes a count of membership, stakes, wards, branches, missions, temples, and family history centers for the worldwide church and for individual countries and territories where the church is recognized. The latest information released was as of December 31, 2021, for the worldwide church, and December 31, 2019, for individual countries and selected territories.

At the end of 2023, the LDS Church had 31,490 congregations and a reported membership of 17,255,394.

In 2005, Peggy Fletcher Stack, longtime religion columnist for The Salt Lake Tribune, estimated that about one-third of the reported LDS membership was "active" (i.e., regularly attending church services and participating in other expected meetings and obligations). In 2005, this would have amounted to approximately 4 million active members among a worldwide LDS population of 12 million. Active membership varied from a high of 40 to 50 percent in congregations in North America and the Pacific Islands, to a low of about 25 percent in Latin America. Fletcher Stack's data was compiled from several sources, including a 2001 survey of religious affiliation by scholars at City University of New York and a demographer at LDS-owned Brigham Young University.

In 2003, church leader Dallin H. Oaks, noted that among recent converts "attrition is sharpest in the two months after baptism", which he attributed in part to difficulties adapting to the church's dietary code, the Word of Wisdom, that prohibits the use of alcohol, tobacco, coffee, and tea. In 2001, sociologist Armand Mauss estimated that about 50 percent of LDS converts in the US stopped attending church within a year of baptism, while outside the US the rate was about 70 percent.

Membership statistics reported by the LDS Church have in some instances found to be inflated, with some counties in Utah having more reported members than there are people living in the county.

== History ==
In 1890, Utah had 118,201 Latter-day Saints members.

The church experienced rapid numerical growth in the 20th century, especially in the 1980s and 1990s. For instance, in 1983, non-LDS sociologist Rodney Stark predicted total church membership could reach 267 million members by 2080. He reiterated those predictions again in 1998 as membership figures continued to exceed his interim predictions.

Since then, however, church membership growth has slowed, especially since around 2012.

In the last decade, the church has more than doubled in size in Africa. The largest regional increases by raw numbers (according to church-reported statistics) occurred in the United States, South America, and Africa.

Between 2007 and 2022, the percentage of Americans who self-identify as Mormon has dropped from 1.8 percent to 1.2 percent (according to an independent tabulation of election survey data) - a percentage decrease of one-third over 15 years.

== Mormon corridor ==
The Mormon corridor refers to the areas of western North America that were settled between 1850 and approximately 1890 by members of the Church of Jesus Christ of Latter-day Saints (LDS Church), who are commonly called "Mormons".

In academic literature, the area is also commonly called the Mormon culture region.

It generally follows the path of the Rocky Mountains of North America, with most of the population clustered in the United States. Beginning in Utah, the corridor extends northward through western Wyoming and eastern Idaho to parts of Montana and the deep south regions of the Canadian province of Alberta. It reaches south to San Bernardino, California on the west and through Tucson, Arizona on the east, reaches west to the Jordan Valley, Oregon area extending southward to Eldorado, Texas, and finally the U.S.-Mexico border, with isolated settlements in Baja California, Chihuahua, and Sonora. Settlements in Utah, south of the Wasatch Front, stretched from St. George in the southwest to Nephi in the northeast, including the Sevier River valley. The corridor is roughly congruent with the area between present-day Interstate 15 and U.S. Route 89.

The larger chain of Mormon settlements, ranging from Canada to Mexico, were initially established as agricultural centers or to gain access to metals and other materials needed by the expanding Mormon population. The communities also served as waystations for migration and trade centered on Salt Lake City during the mid- to late 19th century.

== Race and ethnicity ==
Pew 2014 U.S. Religious Landscape Study	LDS (U.S.)	U.S. Avg.
Married	66%	49%
Divorced or separated	7%	11%
Have children under 18	41%	31%
Attendance at religious services (weekly or more)	77%	40%

Pew Research Center 2007 Race, Ethnicity	LDS (U.S.)	U.S. Avg.
White, non-Hispanic	86%	71%
Black, non-Hispanic	3%	11%
Other non-Hispanic	5%	6%
Hispanic	7%	12%

The racial and ethnic composition of membership in the United States is one of the least diverse in the country. Church membership is predominantly white; the membership of blacks is significantly lower than the general U.S. population.

=== Black membership ===
Even though the church does not currently keep official records on the racial makeup of its membership, many estimates of the total worldwide number of Black adherents have been made in the 21st century. These estimates include:

- 400,000
- 500,000
- over 700,000
- 1 million.

== Youth activity ==
Church youth often take active roles in the church. They also tend to report high degrees of formal and informal religious activity, compared with other religious teenagers. Non-LDS sociologist Christian Smith found in 2005 that LDS teenagers were the most or among the most religious of all denominations studied. They were more likely to pray, attend Church weekly and feel connected to their congregation, participate in religious activities at home, have had spiritual experiences, and feel that religion is important in their lives. Smith also found positive correlations between pro-religious behaviors and pro-social qualities in adolescents.

== Activity rates and disaffiliation ==
The LDS Church does not release official statistics on church activity, but it is likely that only approximately 40 percent of its recorded membership in the United States and 30 percent worldwide regularly attend weekly Sunday worship services. A statistical analysis of the 2014 Pew Religious Landscape Survey assessed that "about one-third of those with a Latter-day Saint background... left the Church", identifying as disaffiliated. Activity rates vary with age, and disengagement occurs most frequently between age 16 and 25. Young single adults are more likely to become inactive than their married counterparts, and overall, women tend to be more active than men.

== Politics ==
A 2012 Pew Center on Religion and Public Life survey indicates that 74 percent of U.S. members lean towards the Republican Party. Some liberal members say they feel that they have to defend their worthiness due to political differences.

In 2016, following Donald Trump's proposed Muslim travel ban, many LDS Church members – who are one of the most consistently Republican voting groups – formed a significant faction of traditional Republican voters skeptical of Trump, with just 11% support in Utah. These voters saw parallels between Trump's anti-immigrant and anti-Islam rhetoric and the past persecution of Mormons in the United States. They expressed concern regarding his weak moral character evidenced by his denigration of women, extramarital involvements, questionable business scruples and personal affairs, and his general nescience regarding scripture and religion. Nevertheless, by January 2018, many Republican church members in Utah had expressed their political support for Trump, in particular his policies on land and environmental issues, and his strongarm approach towards Democrats and other political opponents. His approval rating was 61%, higher than any other religious group.

=== Liberal Latter-day Saints ===
Democrats and those who lean Democrat made up 18% of church members surveyed in the 2014 Pew Research Center's Religious Landscape Survey. That percentage increased to 26% of church members affiliating with the Democratic Party by 2022, according to Harvard University's Cooperative Election Study. There has been at least one Democratic Senator and member of the church, Harry Reid and Tom Udall. In addition, there have been groups of Latter-day Saints that support liberal candidates, including forming the organization Latter-day Saints for Biden-Harris in the 2020 presidential election season. Other examples include the ward in Berkeley, California pushing back against 2008 California Proposition 8, a ballot proposition and a state constitutional amendment intended to ban same-sex marriage, and other members of the church advocating for Mormon feminism (which the church has historically discouraged with blanket statements of policy, but recently advocated a more nuanced stance).

== Fertility ==
In areas with a high concentration of Latter-day Saints such as Utah, household sizes and fertility rates have historically been above the national average. As of 2021, American church members have an average of 2.8 children per household by ages 35-45, as opposed to a US national average of 2.06.

In recent years, Latter-day Saint birth rates have declined.

== See also ==
- Membership statistics (LDS Church)
- Membership history of the Church of Jesus Christ of Latter-day Saints

== Sources ==
- Allen, James B.; Leonard, Glen M. (1992). The Story of the Latter-day Saints (2nd ed.). Salt Lake City: Deseret Book. ISBN 087579565X.
- Bushman, Richard (2008), Mormonism: A Very Short Introduction, Very Short Introductions, Oxford University Press, ISBN 978-0-19-531030-6
- LDS Church (2006), Church Handbook of Instructions, Salt Lake City, Utah: LDS Church
- Farmer, Jared (2008), On Zion's Mount: Mormons, Indians, and the American Landscape, Cambridge, MA: Belknap Press of Harvard University Press, ISBN 9780674036710
