= History of the Saints (TV series) =

Television documentary about Mormon Pioneers

- Series title card
- Genre: History; Mormon studies Documentary
- Written by: Glenn Rawson
- Directed by: Bryant Bush
- Narrated by: Glenn Rawson
- Country of origin: United States
- Original language: English

Production
- Executive producers: Dennis Lyman; Glenn Rawson
- Editor: Bryant Bush
- Running time: 30 minutes

Original release
- Network: KSL-TV
- Release: October 10, 2010 – present

The History of the Saints: Gathering to the West is a television documentary series produced by Dennis Lyman and Glenn Rawson. It focuses on the history of the Church of Jesus Christ of Latter-day Saints (LDS Church) and its members following the death of Joseph Smith. This includes the story of the Mormon Pioneers as they left behind Nauvoo, Illinois and traveled along the Mormon Trail to Utah.

== Production ==
Following the completion of The Joseph Smith Papers TV series, the same team that produced that series began work on the History of the Saints. A full-length preview of the program was shown October 2, 2010, on KSL-TV, following the Saturday morning session of the 180th Semiannual General Conference. Season one began airing October 10, 2010 on KSL-TV.

== Plot synopsis ==
The first season begins with the death of Joseph Smith and the succession crisis, and then follows the story of the Mormon Pioneers as they traveled the Mormon Trail to the Rocky Mountains and what would become the Utah Territory. Other seasons are expected and will tell the story of the colonization of the Intermountain West and Church developments in Utah.

== Episode list ==
- The first column refers to the episode's number in the overall series.
- The second column refers to the episode's number in that particular season.

=== Season 1 (2010) ===
No. overall	No. in season	Title	Original release date
1	1	"The Martyrdom of Joseph and Hyrum Smith"	October 10, 2010
On June 27, 1844, Joseph Smith and his brother Hyrum were shot and killed in an attack inside the jailhouse at Carthage, Illinois. This episode discusses the martyrdom and the events leading up to it, including the destruction of the Nauvoo Expositor. Scholars interviewed include: Kenneth W. Godfrey, Jeffery N. Walker.
2	2	"The Aftermath of the Martyrdom"	October 17, 2010
Following the death of Joseph and Hyrum Smith, many enemies of the Church hoped its members would disband, and the Church disintegrate. This episode discusses how people, both in and out of the Church, reacted to the murders, along with the funeral of Joseph Smith, and how the trial of the accused killers played out. Scholars interviewed include: Kenneth W. Godfrey, Dean C. Jessee, Jeffery N. Walker.
3	3	"The City of Joseph Part 1"	October 24, 2010
This episode tells the story of the momentous days and weeks immediately after the Martyrdom of Joseph Smith. Critical decisions were made and dramas played out that set the course of the Church of Jesus Christ of Latter-day Saints for generations to come. Scholars interviewed include: Richard E. Bennett, William G. Hartley, Glen M. Leonard, Ronald K. Esplin, Susan Easton Black, Susan Sessions Rugh.
4	4	"The City of Joseph Part 2"	October 31, 2010
By the summer of 1845 the time of Latter-day Saints in Nauvoo, Illinois was coming to a close. Persecution and public opinion were mounting against them. They would have to leave. Where would they go and by what miracle would they get there? This episode tells the story of the last days of Nauvoo. Scholars interviewed include: Richard E. Bennett, William G. Hartley, Glen M. Leonard, Ronald K. Esplin, Susan Easton Black, Susan Sessions Rugh, Fred E. Woods.
5	5	"The Nauvoo Temple"	November 7, 2010
As with the ancients, the Latter-day Saints are a temple building people. First there was the House of the Lord in Kirtland, Ohio where the Lord revealed himself. Then others were planned in Independence and Far West Missouri that the Saints were unable to complete. Then in October of 1840, the Prophet Joseph Smith announced they would build another Temple; this one in Nauvoo, Illinois. This episode tells the story of the Nauvoo Temple. Scholars interviewed include: Richard E. Bennett, William G. Hartley, Glen M. Leonard, Richard O. Cowan, Susan Easton Black, Don F. Colvin.
6	6	"The Great Western Measure"	November 14, 2010
Far from being an accidental or sudden idea, the exodus of the Latter-day Saints to the West was an informed and planned decision. It was not an idea that originated with Brigham Young, but rather with Joseph Smith who spoke of it as early as the 1830s. When the Saints went west, it was not the migration of random peoples looking for gold, game, or fur—it was the movement of a displaced people—an entire culture—looking for a home. Scholars interviewed include: Alexander L. Baugh, Fred R. Gowans, Richard E. Bennett, William G. Hartley, Fred E. Woods, Glen M. Leonard.
7	7	"Winter Exodus"	November 21, 2010
The Latter-day Saints were driven out of Nauvoo, but they also left by willing choice. They understood that they had a new home somewhere beyond the Rocky Mountains. They left at different times and under different circumstances—some not so pleasant. This is the story of the Winter Exodus in February 1846. Scholars interviewed include: Richard E. Bennett, William G. Hartley, Glen M. Leonard, Carol Cornwall Madsen, Susan Easton Black, Don F. Colvin.
8	8	"Across Iowa"	November 28, 2010
March 1, 1846, with the Camp of Israel now reorganized, Brigham Young set out to the West with the intent of crossing the mountains that year, but there were immediate and unexpected problems. They were moving too slow, the weather was awful, and too many were ill supplied. This episode describes the Saints arduous journey across Iowa. Scholars interviewed include: Richard E. Bennett, William G. Hartley, Carol Cornwall Madsen, Clive Romney, Jill N. Crandell.
9	9	"Brigham Young: The Lion of the Lord"	December 5, 2010
What Joseph Smith started Brigham Young saved. He has been called one of the "Twin Pillars of the Restoration." This episode tells the story of Brigham Young as he assumes leadership and leads the saints west. Scholars interviewed include: Richard E. Bennett, Ronald W. Walker, Ronald K. Esplin.
10	10	"Spring Exodus"	December 12, 2010
While President Young and most of the Twelve had left Nauvoo in February 1846, the great majority of the Saints were supposed to, and did, leave Nauvoo in the Spring. They made much better time across Iowa and caught up with the Camp of Israel near the Pisgah settlement. This episode of History of the Saints is the story of the Spring Exodus of Nauvoo. The scholarship of William G. Hartley, Carol Cornwall Madsen, and Richard E. Bennett are featured.
11	11	"The Mormon Battalion Part 1"	December 19, 2010
As difficult as times were for the Church in 1846, they were equally trying for the United States. On May 13, 1846, the United States declared war on Mexico. With all that concerned U.S. president James K. Polk at that time, he manifested a particular concern regarding the Mormons; a small band of exiles struggling for existence on the banks of the Missouri River? This episode begins the story of the Mormon Battalion and features the scholarship of Colonel Sherman L. Fleek, Michael Landon, Susan Easton Black, William G. Hartley, Richard E. Bennett, and Jill Crandell.

== See also ==
- The Joseph Smith Papers (TV series)
