= Arthur Clark =

Arthur Clark may refer to:

- Arthur Clark (athlete) (1900–?), British Olympic athlete
- Arthur H. Clark (1924–2017), Australian sculptor
- Arthur Melville Clark (1895–1990), Scottish educationalist and author
- Seymour Clark (Arthur Henry Seymour Clark, 1902–1995), English cricketer
- Alfred Alexander Gordon Clark (1900–1958), English judge and crime writer under the pseudonym Cyril Hare
- Arthur Clark (Massachusetts politician), member of the Great and General Court
- Arthur Bridgman Clark (1866–1948), American architect and mayor of Mayfield
- Arthur B. Clark (1888–1968), American politician from Mississippi
- Arthur Clark (assemblyman), member of the 99th New York State Legislature
- Arthur Clark (diplomat) (1908–1967), British diplomat
- Arthur Clark (rugby union) (born 2001), English rugby union player

== See also ==
- Arthur H. Clark Company, printer
- Arthur Clarke (disambiguation)
- John Arthur Clark (1886–1976), Canadian politician
