= Eugene E. Campbell =

American historian (1915–1986)

Military career
- 1944–1946
- Allegiance: United States
- Service/branch: United States Army
- Rank: First lieutenant
- Unit: Chaplain Corps, 71st Infantry Division
- Battles/wars: World War II
- Awards: Two battle stars

Personal details
- Born: Eugene Edward Campbell; April 26, 1915; Tooele, Utah, United States
- Died: April 10, 1986 (aged 70); Glendora, California, United States
- Resting place: Provo City Cemetery; 40.225°N 111.644°W
- Alma mater: University of Utah (B.d.h, M.A.); University of Southern California (Ph.D.)
- Spouse(s): Beth Larsen
- Children: 5
- Parents: Edward Campbell; Betsy Ann Bowen

Eugene Edward "Gene" Campbell (April 26, 1915 – April 10, 1986) was an American professor of history at Brigham Young University.

== Biography ==
Campbell was born and raised in Tooele, Utah, in a working-class Latter-day Saint family, Edward Campbell and Betsy Ann Bowen. When Campbell was fourteen, his father, who was a railroad engineer, died suddenly. His mother was active in the community and her elected position as county treasurer helped the family survive the Great Depression.

=== Education and military service ===
Following his 1933 graduation from Tooele High School, his interest in sports led him to attend Snow Junior College in Ephraim, Utah. He was not very active in sports and student government and received his Associate of Arts degree in 1935. Then he served as a missionary for the Church of Jesus Christ of Latter-day Saints (LDS Church) in Eastern Canada. After returning home in 1937 and studying history at the University of Utah, Campbell received his bachelor's degree in history with honors in 1939 and his master's degree in 1940.

In 1939, Campbell married Beth Larsen, whom he knew in high school and had dated for seven years. They would have five children.

After teaching LDS Seminary part-time for a year, Campbell became a full-time instructor from 1940 to 1944 in Wayne County, Utah, and Magna, Utah.

From 1944 to 1946, during World War II, Campbell served in the Chaplain Corps of the United States Army as a First Lieutenant. He attended Chaplains School at Harvard University and was assigned to the 71st Infantry Division and received two battle stars.

After the war, Campbell returned to religious teaching in the LDS Church Educational System, this time in the church's Institutes of Religion, first as Institute director at Idaho State University in Pocatello, then as associate director at Utah State University at Logan. Campbell completed his Ph.D. at the University of Southern California in 1952, writing his dissertation on the history of the LDS Church in California.

=== Academic career ===
After completing his education, Campbell taught at Ricks College in Rexburg, Idaho, until joining the history faculty of BYU from 1956 to 1980. At BYU, Campbell worked in various capacities and held many positions, including the history department's acting chair (1958–59) and chair (1960–67), chair of Visiting Professor Lectureships (1965), tour leader for BYU Tours of Europe, associate director for a study abroad program (1965), board member of the Charles Redd Center for Western Studies (1972–80), member of the Athletic Advisory Council, member of the Graduate Council, member of the Faculty Advisor Council, president of the BYU chapter of AAUP (1965–66), member of the board of editors for BYU Studies (1968–73), and main speaker at the 1973 and 1980 graduations of the College of Social Sciences. He also taught history at the Church College of Hawaii, while on leave from BYU in 1967–68.

Campbell was also involved in the larger historical community. In 1965 he was one of the co-founders of the Mormon History Association, served as its first vice president, and the next year was its second president. He was active in the Utah State Historical Society, serving as president of its Utah Valley Chapter in 1968 and a Fellow in 1978, an honor only given to fifteen others before, including to Fawn Brodie, Leonard J. Arrington, LeRoy Hafen and Juanita Brooks. Campbell was a member of the Danforth Associates and the Western History Association, and consulted for the National Endowment for the Humanities for many years starting in 1975.

== List of publications ==
The following is a list of Campbell's published work:

=== Books ===
- Fielding, R. Kent; Eugene E. Campbell (1964). The United States, An Interpretive History. New York: Harper & Row.
- Campbell, Eugene E.; Richard D. Poll (1975). Hugh B. Brown, His Life and Thought. Salt Lake City, Utah: Bookcraft. ISBN 0-88494-293-7.
- Gowans, Fred R.; Eugene E. Campbell (1975). Fort Bridger, Island in the Wilderness. Provo, Utah: Brigham Young University Press. ISBN 0-8425-0419-2.
- ———; ——— (1976). Fort Supply: Brigham Young's Green River Experiment. Provo, Utah: Brigham Young University Publications.
- Poll, Richard D.; Miller, David E.; Campbell, Eugene E.; Alexander, Thomas G., eds. (1978). Utah's History. Provo, Utah: Brigham Young University Press. ISBN 0-8425-0842-2.
- Roylance, Ward J.; Eugene E. Campbell (1982). Utah, A Guide to the State (Revised and enlarged ed.). Salt Lake City: Utah, A Guide to the State Foundation. OCLC 8638908.
- Campbell, Eugene E. (1988). Establishing Zion: The Mormon Church in the American West, 1847–69. Salt Lake City, Utah: Signature Books. ISBN 0-941214-62-1.
- ——— (1992). "Foreword". The Essential Brigham Young. Classics in Mormon Thought. Vol. 3. Salt Lake City, Utah: Signature Books. ISBN 1-56085-010-8.

=== Articles ===
- Campbell, Eugene E. (Spring 1959). "The Apostasy of Samuel Brannan". Utah Historical Quarterly. 27 (2): 157–67. doi:10.2307/45058142. JSTOR 45058142. S2CID 254430102. Archived from the original on 2011-06-14.
- ——— (Winter 1960). "The Mormon Gold-Mining Mission of 1849". BYU Studies. 2 (1): 19–31.
- ——— (Winter 1968). "Authority Conflicts in the Mormon Battalion". BYU Studies. 8 (2): 127–42.
- ——— (Spring 1971). "The Mormons and the Donner Party". BYU Studies. 11 (3): 307–11.
- ——— (1973). "Brigham Young's Outer Cordon: A Reappraisal". Utah Historical Quarterly. 41 (3): 220–53. doi:10.2307/45059369. JSTOR 45059369. S2CID 254430755. Archived from the original on 2011-08-08.
- ———; Campbell, Bruce L. (Winter 1978). "Divorce Among Mormon Polygamists: Extent and Explanations". Utah Historical Quarterly. 46 (1): 4–23. doi:10.2307/45060568. JSTOR 45060568. S2CID 254441498. Archived from the original on 2011-08-08.
- ——— (Summer 1983). "The M-Factors in Tooele's History". Utah Historical Quarterly. 51 (3): 272–88. doi:10.2307/45061005. JSTOR 45061005. S2CID 254450276. Archived from the original on 2011-08-08.
- ——— (Summer 1992). "I Wanted to Be a Chaplain: A Reminiscence of World War II". Utah Historical Quarterly. 60 (3): 277–84. doi:10.2307/45062055. JSTOR 45062055. S2CID 254438005. Archived from the original on 2011-08-08.

=== Papers ===
- Campbell, Eugene E. (1940). "The Government of Utah, 1847–1851". [masters thesis]. Salt Lake City: Department of History, University of Utah.
- ——— (1952). "A History of the Church of Jesus Christ of Latter-day Saints in California, 1846-1946". [doctoral thesis]. Los Angeles: University of Southern California.
- ——— (1960). "This Was the Place". BYU Speeches of the Year, 1959–1960. [Delivered to student body, July 23, 1959]. Provo, Utah: Brigham Young University.
- ——— (1960). "The Physical and Political Setting of the New Testament". New Testament Conference. Provo, Utah: Brigham Young University. pp. 34–42. ISBN 91-22-00929-9.
- ——— (August 19–20, 1977). "The Early Utah Period (1847-69)". Church Educational System Religious Educators' Symposium. pp. 42–44.

=== Book reviews ===
Eugene Campbell reviewed numerous books for various academic journals.

- "The First 100 Years: A History of the Salt Lake Tribune, 1871–1971". BYU Studies. 12 (1): 142–44. Autumn 1971.
- "In Pursuit of the Golden Dream: Reminiscences of San Francisco and the Northern and Southern Mines". Utah Historical Quarterly. 40 (1): 90–91. Winter 1972. doi:10.2307/45059242. JSTOR 45059242. S2CID 254432889. Archived from the original on 2011-08-08.
- "Twelve Mormon Homes Visited in Succession on a Journey Through Utah to Arizona". BYU Studies. 15 (4): 543–45. Summer 1975.
- "Charles C. Rich [and] David Eccles by Leonard Arrington". Western Historical Quarterly. 7 (2): 200–02. April 1976. doi:10.2307/967521. JSTOR 967521.
- "A Biography of Ezra Thompson Clark". Utah Historical Quarterly. 44 (3): 303–04. Summer 1976. doi:10.2307/45059697. JSTOR 45059697. S2CID 254431938. Archived from the original on 2011-08-08.
- "Spencer W. Kimball" (PDF). Sunstone. 3 (5): 29–30. July–August 1978.
- "The Genteel Gentile: Letters of Elizabeth Cumming, 1857–1858". BYU Studies. 19 (1): 127–28. Fall 1978.
- Campbell, Eugene E; Brooks, Juanita; Haywood, Martha Spence (April 1979). "Not By Bread Alone: The Journal of Martha Spence Haywood, 1850–56". Western Historical Quarterly. 10 (2): 239–40. doi:10.2307/968043. JSTOR 968043.
- "Deseret's Sons of Toil". Nevada Historical Society Quarterly. 23: 127–28. Summer 1980.
- "Brother Brigham". BYU Studies. 21 (1): 125–28. Winter 1981.
- "Heber C. Kimball: Mormon Patriarch and Pioneer". Utah Historical Quarterly. 50 (1): 91–92. Winter 1982. doi:10.2307/45061358. JSTOR 45061358. S2CID 254429000. Archived from the original on 2011-08-08.
- "The Saints and the Union, Utah Territory During the Civil War". BYU Studies. 22 (4): 500–01. Fall 1982.
- "Mormon Thunder". Western Humanities Review. 37 (4): 354–56. Winter 1983.
- Campbell, Eugene E. (Winter 1983). "Revised But Unchanged". Dialogue: A Journal of Mormon Thought. 16 (4): 148–49. doi:10.2307/45225207. JSTOR 45225207. S2CID 254392915.
- "Saints, Slaves, and Blacks". Nevada Historical Society Quarterly. 27 (1): 54–55. Spring 1984.
- "Not Quite What Was Promised, But Much More". Dialogue: A Journal of Mormon Thought. 18 (1): 162–63. Spring 1985. doi:10.2307/45225338. JSTOR 45225338. Archived from the original on 2011-06-14.

== Reviews of Campbell's work ==
Fort Bridger: Island in the Wilderness

- Davis, W. N. Jr. (January 1976). Western Historical Quarterly 7: 80.
- Murray, Robert A. (Winter 1976). Utah Historical Quarterly 44 (1): 98–99.
- Raines, Edgar Frank Jr. (Summer 1976). Arizona and the West 18: 185–87.
- Mattes, Merrill J. (Fall 1976). Colorado Magazine 53: 380–81.

Fort Supply: Brigham Young's Green River Experiment

- Edwards, Elbert B. (Spring 1978). Utah Historical Quarterly 46 (2): 205–06.

Utah's History

- Petersen, Scott R. (August 1978). Mountainwest 4: 58.
- (June–July 1979). Frontier Times 53: 39.
- Layton, Stanford J. (September–October 1979). American West 16: 54–55.
- Smith, Melvin T. (January 1980). Western Historical Quarterly: 74–75.
- Sillito, John R. (Spring 1982). Idaho Yesterdays 26: 37–38.

Utah: A Guide to the State

- Arrington, Leonard J. (Fall 1982). BYU Studies 22: 502–04.

Establishing Zion

- (October 1, 1988). Church News (58): 13.
- Etter, Patricia A. (December 1988). Books of the Southwest (361): 9.
- Walker, Ronald W. (Spring 1989). BYU Studies 29 (2): 126–27.
- Smith, Melvin T. (Spring 1989). Utah Historical Quarterly 57 (2): 181–83.
- Pointer, Richard W. (April 1989). Pacific Northwest Quarterly 80 (2): 73.
- Parrish, William Earl (July 1989). Journal of the West 28 (3): 92.
- Sadler, Richard W. (Fall 1989). Dialogue: A Journal of Mormon Thought 22 (3): 152–154.
- Lyman, E. Leo (November 1989). Western Historical Quarterly 20 (4): 454–55.
- DePillis, Mario S. (December 1989). Journal of American History 76 (3): 933–34.
- May, Dean L. (June 1990). Sunstone 14 (3): 55–56.
- Peterson, Charles S. (July 1990). New Mexico Historical Review 65 (3): 384–85.

The Essential Brigham Young

- Guarneri, Carl. (Spring 1993). Journal of the Early Republic 13 (1): 110–12.
- Jones, Gerald E. (December 1993). Church History 62 (4): 573–74.
