= The Story of the Latter-day Saints =

- Dust jacket used on both printings of the first edition.
- Author: James B. Allen and Glen M. Leonard
- Language: English
- Subject: The Church of Jesus Christ of Latter-day Saints
- Genre: Historical
- Publisher: Deseret Book in collaboration with the LDS Church's Historical Dept.
- Publication date: July 1976
- Publication place: United States
- Media type: Print (Hardcover)
- Pages: 722 pp
- ISBN: 0-87747-594-6
- Followed by: 1992 2nd edition

The Story of the Latter-day Saints is a single-volume history of the Church of Jesus Christ of Latter-day Saints (LDS Church) by James B. Allen and Glen M. Leonard, first published in 1976.

== Overview ==
The authors summarised the tone of their work by identifying four recurring themes that emerged throughout The Story of the Latter-day Saints:

1. The Latter-day Saints were primarily religiously motivated.
2. The church was always influenced by its environment, to some degree.
3. The church started small and American but would grow into an international organization.
4. The church has been flexible with some issues, yet committed to certain central teachings.

Although seen as well written and comprehensive, the book was intended for a Latter-day Saint audience, because it detailed minutiae like organizational changes, but didn't focus on issues of interest to new readers on Mormonism. Unlike most earlier Mormon histories, this book focused on casting the church in a broader context, addressed controversial historical issues, and covered the events of the twentieth century.

The following list of the book's chapters also describe its historical scope:

1. The Religious Setting for the Restoration
2. The Restoration Commences, 1820-1831
3. Unfolding Latter-day Zion, 1831-1836
4. The Saints Move On, 1836-1839
5. Building the City Beautiful, 1839-1842
6. Difficult Days: Nauvoo, 1842-1845
7. Exodus to a New Zion, 1846-1850
8. Establishing an Ensign, 1851-1856
9. In the National Spotlight, 1856-1863
10. Challenges and Cooperatives, 1864-1872
11. Close of a Career, 1872-1877
12. A Turbulent Decade, 1877-1887
13. The End of an Era, 1887-1896
14. A Time of Transition, 1897-1907
15. Consolidating for Growth, 1908-1918
16. Change and Continuity in the Postwar Decade, 1919-1930
17. The Church and the Great Depression, 1930-1938
18. The Church in World War II, 1939-1950
19. Foundations for Expansion, 1951-1959
20. Correlating the Worldwide Church, 1960-1973
21. "Lengthening Our Stride," 1973-1976

In the 1992 second edition, the last chapter was changed to "Toward a Universal Church, 1974-1990".

== History ==
=== Impetus ===
For over 50 years, Joseph Fielding Smith's Essentials in Church History was issued as a popular single-volume history of the LDS Church. After Smith's death in 1972, LDS Church and Deseret Book officials asked the church's Historical Department to write a new single-volume history to replace Essentials in Church History and cover more recent events, while using new sources available in the Church Archives. With the First Presidency's approval, the department assigned the project to Allen, an Assistant Church Historian, and Leonard, a Senior Historical Associate. The Story of the Latter-day Saints was published in 1976, the one-hundredth anniversary of Joseph Fielding Smith's birth.

The book took a non-partisan, factually-sound approach to LDS Church history and was the first time the entire history of Mormonism was professionally surveyed in one book. It was also one of the first institutionally-sponsored publications to deal frankly with many controversial issues such as the complexities of Nauvoo, and the church's political, economic, social and doctrinal developments. As professional historians, the authors cast their subject in its historic context, with connections made to larger Restoration and American movements. The product revealed the challenges and progress of the new Mormon history in confronting controversy and reevaluating setting and tone.

=== Reception ===
Anticipating high demand, Deseret Book prepared a very large first printing of 35,000. It sold quickly with 10,000 copies in the first month, including 5,000 to the LDS Church's Public Communications department to place in U.S. libraries. Nearly 20,000 copies sold in the first year and the entire original printing was sold out within three years.

The book was initially received favorably. It was called a "significant" and "pathbreaking" history of Mormonism. Historian Richard Poll recommended it "to every serious student of Mormonism and every library interested in history, religion or Americana." Its extensive bibliography was also respected and seen as noteworthy.

The book was commended for its modern scholarship and dispassionate tone while representing a faithful LDS perspective. One review noted the authors' "remarkable blend of the scholarly approach and the religious story… They do not feel constrained to bear testimony, and yet they demonstrate empathy toward Mormonism that could only emanate from devoted members. It is a pleasant balance."

However, this balance risked displeasing both religious and academic readers. Believers in the divinity of all church actions disliked seeing events cast against the influences in their historical setting. History purists wanted the discussion of more issues and problems and felt significant events and details were missing in this concentration of all Mormon history. Allen and Leonard's history was praised and criticized by both Mormon and non-Mormon readers.

=== Controversy ===
In 1976, some members of the Quorum of the Twelve Apostles had concerns that the book wasn't faith-promoting. When they approached quorum president Ezra Taft Benson, he requested a thorough reading by his executive assistant. This produced a critique that asserted the book wasn't spiritual enough to be a "true" LDS history and that the Historical Department's activities should be controlled.

In a speech, Benson publicly worried the book may spiritually harm young church members. He condemned the portrayal of the Word of Wisdom health code and Joseph Smith's visions as being influenced by parallel movements in American history. Benson warned that the terms "experimental systems," "communal life," "primitivists," and "prophet alleged," were offensive and did not promote faith in the church. He advised against purchasing work by "liberal sources," because it would "help sustain their cause."

In a meeting with the First Presidency and Church Historian Leonard J. Arrington, Benson and Apostle Mark E. Petersen argued the book was faith-damaging and should have presented more prophetic evidence. Arrington defended it but agreed to allow future department manuscripts to be reviewed by an Apostle before publication, even though they already passed through a reading committee of accomplished historians.

While other church leaders agreed that the book was too "secular," several continued to support it, including Howard W. Hunter and LDS Church President Spencer W. Kimball. Kimball felt it was a great work and was unhappy with "unchristian" treatment of Allen by some religion faculty at Brigham Young University (BYU) who were upset by it. Kimball thought Allen had performed honorably in this approved assignment, and "that Benson and Petersen did not have the authority or the right to interfere with the sale of the book." However, such support remained private, to preserve the public unity of the Apostles.

Despite its quick sell-out, The Story of the Latter-day Saints was not reprinted for years, and some doubted it would ever be. It was rumored to be uncitable in publications by Deseret Book and the Church Educational System.

=== Aftermath ===
The book fueled growing suspicion and disfavor with the Historical Department's activities, which led to the History Division's turning point. Plans were cancelled for a 16 volume comprehensive history series in honor of the church's sesquicentennial. Division staff was downsized, bureaucratized and eventually transferred to BYU, where they could publish under academic rather than ecclesiastical sponsorship.

Eventually, a second printing was approved for 1986. Later, Allen and Leonard prepared a revised and updated manuscript, which was published as a second edition in 1992. After the controversy dissipated, the book was still seen as an influential and notable accomplishment in its field. It is appreciated as respectful and faithful in its approach and "a model example of the new Mormon history ... It remains the best one-volume treatment of the Mormon past and the place where the beginning student of LDS history should turn first." Curt Bench, a dealer in fine and rare Mormon books, listed it as one of the 50 most important Mormon books.

== Reviews ==
The following are published reviews of The Story of the Latter-day Saints

- Drayton, John N. (Fall 1976). Sunstone 1 (4): 86–88
- Ellsworth, S. George (Winter 1977). BYU Studies 17 (2): 241–46
- Paul, Rodman W. (July 1977). Western Historical Quarterly 8: 351–53
- Lythgoe, Dennis L. (Autumn 1977). Dialogue: A Journal of Mormon Thought 10 (4): 134–37
- MacKinnon, William P. (Autumn 1977). Arizona and the West 19: 272–74
- Foster, Lawrence (September 1977). Church History 46: 403–04
- Hansen, Klaus J. (Winter 1978). Utah Historical Quarterly 46 (1): 82–86
- Peterson, Charles S. (Winter 1978). Idaho Yesterdays 21 (4): 31–32
- Cannon, Donald Q. (1993). BYU Studies 33 (3): 618–23
- Bennett, Richard E. (Spring 1994). Journal of Mormon History 20 (1): 153–56
