= James B. Allen (historian) =

American historian (1927–2024)

- Born: June 14, 1927; Logan, Utah, U.S.
- Died: September 2, 2024 (aged 97)
- Education: Utah State University (B.A.); Brigham Young University (M.A.); University of Southern California (Ph.D.)
- Occupations: Historian; University professor
- Employer: Brigham Young University
- Known for: Assistant Church Historian; Author of Mormon histories, such as The Story of the Latter-day Saints
- Spouse: Renée Jones Allen
- Children: 5
- Website: Personal site

James Brown Allen (June 14, 1927 – September 2, 2024) was an American historian of Mormonism and was an Assistant Church Historian of the Church of Jesus Christ of Latter-day Saints (LDS Church) from 1972 to 1979. While working as Assistant Church Historian, he co-authored The Story of the Latter-day Saints with Glen Leonard. After Ezra Taft Benson dismissed the book as secular new history, other events led to the dissolution of the LDS Church History department in 1982. Allen resigned as Assistant Church Historian in 1979, returning to work at Brigham Young University (BYU) full-time.

He received a bachelor's degree in history from Utah State University (USU), a master's degree from BYU, and a PhD at the University of Southern California (USC). After working as both a seminary teacher and coordinator, he joined BYU's history department in 1964, where he was department chair from 1981 to 1987. After his retirement in 1992, he was a senior research fellow at the Joseph Fielding Smith Institute for Latter-day Saint History.

== Early life and education ==
Allen was born on June 14, 1927, in Ogden, Utah. During his childhood, his family lived in Coalville, Utah, Salt Lake City, Utah, Fairview, Wyoming, and Afton, Wyoming. His family moved to Logan, Utah when he was ten, to give him and his siblings the opportunity to go to college. After graduating from high school in 1945, he joined the U.S. Navy and became a Navy photographer in Washington, D.C. A member of the LDS Church, he served as a missionary in the California Mission under Oscar W. McConkie from 1948 to 1950, "without purse or scrip," depending on the generosity of others for his room and board.

As an undergraduate student, Allen attended USU in Logan, receiving a B.A. in history in 1954. George Ellsworth and Eugene Campbell were two of his most influential teachers. During Campbell's graduate history seminar on how to write history, which Allen took as a senior undergraduate, he met Leonard J. Arrington, a new economics professor and classmate who greatly influenced Allen's career. Allen's paper from that seminar was published in Utah Historical Quarterly in 1955 and became the basis for his graduate studies. Allen pursued an M.A. in history at BYU, with Richard D. Poll as his major professor. In 1956, his thesis, The Development of County Government in the Territory of Utah, 1850-1896, which drew from his earlier published article, was completed. Allen attended USC on a full-tuition scholarship and received a PhD in history in 1963. His dissertation, The Company Town in the American West, was later published as a book by the University of Oklahoma Press.

== Career ==
Starting in 1954, Allen worked for the Church Educational System (CES) in a variety of roles. In Kaysville, Utah he was a seminary teacher, as well as in Cowley, Wyoming, where he was also the coordinator of seminaries from 1955 to 1957. He taught at LDS Church Institutes of Religion for nine years, and was director of the institutes in Long Beach and San Bernardino, California while pursuing his doctorate at USC.

Allen joined the religion faculty at BYU in 1963, and then the history department in 1964. He taught both religion and history classes. In the early 1970s, he was the doctoral major professor and mentor of Ron Esplin, who would become another notable Mormon historian. He was chair of the history department from 1981 to 1987, and afterward held the Lemuel Hardison Redd Jr. Chair in Western American History, until his 1992 retirement. From 1992 to 2005, he was a senior research fellow with BYU's Joseph Fielding Smith Institute for Latter-day Saint History and served on its executive committee for a time. In 2002, he taught as a volunteer in the history department of Brigham Young University—Hawaii. He co-edited The Joseph Smith Papers, Journals, Vol. 2.

Fellow historian Davis Bitton listed Allen as a historian who maintains his church membership while also having a deep understanding of its history, arguing that the existence of faithful historians shows that a knowledge of LDS Church history does not necessarily lead to leaving the church.

=== Mormon History Association ===
In 1965, Allen was one of the founders of the Mormon History Association (MHA), along with Leonard J. Arrington. He served as its vice-president in 1970 and president in 1972. Representing the MHA, Allen wrote and edited the "Historian's Corner," a semi-annual column in the quarterly BYU Studies from 1970 to 1982, when he was succeeded by Ronald W. Walker. The Mormon History Association selected Allen to discuss the impact of the Hoffman forgeries, describing Allen as "a senior historian whose work has commanded respect among [his] colleagues."

=== Assistant Church Historian ===
In 1972, Allen was called to be an Assistant Church Historian for the LDS Church, at the request of Leonard J. Arrington. He served half-time in that capacity, continuing his BYU professorship at the same time. Arrington had assembled a team of professional historians to engage in new academic research with use of the church archives. Among the first major publications to emerge was The Story of the Latter-day Saints, a comprehensive single-volume history of the LDS Church written by Allen and Glen M. Leonard, a Senior Historical Associate in the church's Historical Department, and published in 1976.

The book was well received by the general and academic audiences, but some church leaders were uncomfortable. Allen's philosophy was to directly address historical controversies while casting them against the context of their own time. Ezra Taft Benson denounced the book as new history that was "underplaying revelation" at a fireside and later, at an address for CES instructors. It was not republished for years, despite its popularity. Spencer W. Kimball and Howard W. Hunter both privately praised the book. In 1979, Allen resigned as Assistant Church Historian and returned full-time to BYU. Around this time, the department's History Division came under greater suspicion and scrutiny, and its staff and programs were curtailed before being transferred to BYU in 1982 as the Joseph Fielding Smith Institute for Church History.

At BYU, Allen was treated in "a scandalous way" by some religion faculty who were unhappy with his book. Later, some university trustees had reservations about Allen's 1981 appointment as chair of the history department. However, he retained leadership roles at BYU until his 1992 retirement, when he rejoined the staff and programs from the old History Division, at BYU's Joseph Fielding Smith Institute.

== Personal life ==
Allen served in the LDS Church throughout his life, including as a bishop of a student ward at BYU in the 1960s and a stake high councilor. In politics, he also served for a time as a District Republican committeeman. From 1999 to 2000, Allen and his wife served as full-time CES missionaries at the Boston Institute of Religion.

Allen lived in Orem, Utah and was married to Renée Jones. They have five children. One of his daughters married the writer Orson Scott Card. Orson Scott Card cites his admiration for Allen as having "the kind of skepticism [...] that is a servant to orthodox faith."

Allen died on September 2, 2024, at the age of 97.

== Awards ==
- 1968 Best Bibliography Award from the Mormon History Association
- 1980 Morris Rosenblatt award for best popular interest article in Utah Historical Quarterly
- 1984 Distinguished Faculty Lecturer at Brigham Young University
- 1986 David Woolley Evans and Beatrice Cannon Evans Biography Award
- 1987 T. Edgar Lyon Award for Best Article from the Mormon History Association
- 1988 Fellow of the Utah State Historical Society
- 1991 T. Edgar Lyon Best Article Award from the Mormon History Association
- 1994 T. Edgar Lyon Award of Excellence from the Mormon History Association
- 2000 Special Citation for the book Studies in Mormon History, 1830-1997 from the Mormon History Association
- 2001 CHOICE Outstanding Academic Title from the American Library Association
- 2007 Leonard J. Arrington Award for meritorious service to Mormon history from the Mormon History Association

== Published works ==
Allen has published over ninety articles, and fourteen books and monographs.

=== Books ===
- Allen, James B.; Richard O. Cowan (1964). Mormonism in the Twentieth Century. Provo, Utah: Brigham Young University, Extension publications.
- —— (1966). The Company Town in the American West. Norman, Oklahoma: University of Oklahoma Press.
- Hill, Marvin S.; James B. Allen (1972). Mormonism and American Culture. New York: Harper & Row. ISBN 0-06-042819-8.
- Allen, James B.; Thomas G. Alexander (1974). Manchester Mormons: The Journal of William Clayton, 1840 to 1842. Santa Barbara: Peregrine Smith. ISBN 0-87905-024-1.
- ——; Glen M. Leonard (1976). The Story of the Latter-day Saints. Salt Lake City: Deseret Book. ISBN 0-87747-594-6.
- ——; Thomas G. Alexander (1984). Mormons and Gentiles: A History of Salt Lake City. Boulder, Colorado: Pruett Pub. Co. ISBN 0-87108-664-6.
- —— (1987). Trials of Discipleship: The Story of William Clayton, A Mormon. Urbana, Illinois: University of Illinois Press. ISBN 0-252-01369-7.(Republished in 2002 as No Toil nor Labor Fear: The Story of William Clayton)
- ——; Ronald K. Esplin; David J. Whittaker (1992). Men With a Mission, 1837-1841: The Quorum of the Twelve Apostles in the British Isles. Salt Lake City: Deseret Book Company. ISBN 0-87579-546-3.
- ——; Jessie L. Embry; Kahlile B. Mehr (1995). Hearts Turned to the Fathers: A History of the Genealogical Society of Utah, 1894-1994. Provo, Utah: BYU Studies. ISBN 0-8425-2327-8.
- ——; Ronald W. Walker; David J. Whittaker; Armand L. Mauss; Dynette Ivie Reynolds (2000). Studies in Mormon History, 1830-1997: An Indexed Bibliography. Urbana, Illinois: University of Illinois Press. ISBN 0-252-02565-2.
- Walker, Ronald W.; David J. Whittaker; James B. Allen; Armand L. Mauss (2001). Mormon History. Urbana, Illinois: University of Illinois Press. ISBN 0-252-02619-5.

=== Selected articles ===
- Allen, James B. (July 1955). "The Evolution of County Boundaries in Utah". Utah Historical Quarterly. 23: 261–78. doi:10.2307/45057818. JSTOR 45057818. S2CID 254441134. Archived from the original on October 21, 2013.
- —— (January 1964). "Let's Study the Twentieth Century". Improvement Era. Salt Lake City: The Church of Jesus Christ of Latter-day Saints: 34–38.
- —— (Spring 1966). "...The Company Town: A Passing Phase of Utah's Industrial Development". Utah Historical Quarterly. doi:10.2307/45058662. JSTOR 45058662. S2CID 254435862. Archived from the original on October 21, 2013.
- —— (Autumn 1966). "The Significance of Joseph Smith's First Vision in Mormon Thought" (PDF). Dialogue: A Journal of Mormon Thought. 1 (3). Stanford, California: Dialogue Foundation: 29–45. doi:10.2307/45223817. JSTOR 45223817. S2CID 222223353.
- ——; Thomas G. Alexander (Winter 1967). "The Mormons in the Mountain West, A Selected Bibliography". Arizona and the West. 9: 365–84.
- ——; Leonard J. Arrington (Spring 1969). "Mormon Origins in New York: An Introductory Analysis". BYU Studies. 9. Provo, Utah: BYU Press: 241–74.
- —— (Spring 1980). "Good Guys vs. Good Guys: Rudger Clawson, John Sharp, and Civil Disobedience in Nineteenth Century Utah". Utah Historical Quarterly. 48 (2). Salt Lake City: Utah State Historical Society: 148–74. doi:10.2307/45060744. JSTOR 45060744. S2CID 254441804. Archived from the original on October 21, 2013.
- —— (1991). "Would-be Saints: West Africa Before the 1978 Priesthood Revelation". Journal of Mormon History. 17. Provo, Utah: Mormon History Association: 205–47. Archived from the original on June 13, 2011.
- —— (1993). "The Story of 'The Truth, The Way, The Life'". In B. H. Roberts; John W. Welch (eds.). The Truth, The Way, The Life. Provo, Utah: BYU Studies. pp. cxcix–cxcviii. ISBN 1-86082-487-0.
