= George Carse =

Scottish physicist and educationalist

George Alexander Carse
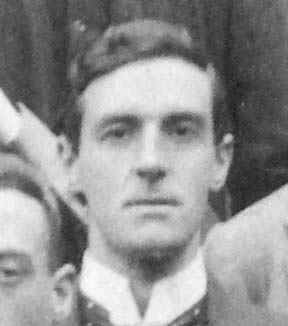
- Carse in August 1913
- Born: June 20, 1880; Edinburgh, Scotland
- Died: 20 August 1950 (aged 70); Edinburgh, Scotland
- Education: University of Edinburgh (BSc); University of Cambridge (PhD)
- Scientific career
- Workplaces: University of Edinburgh

George Alexander Carse FRSE RSSA (20 June 1880 – 20 August 1950) was a leading Scottish physicist and educationalist. In 1925, he was the first Mitchell Lecturer.

== Life ==
Carse was born in Edinburgh on 20 June,, the first child of George Carse, a decorator from Duns, and his wife, Jane. The family lived at 120 Lauriston Place, located south-west of the city center. In 1891, he attended George Heriot’s School and was the school dux in 1898. Carse was awarded a place at the University of Edinburgh to study mathematics under Professor George Chrystal and physics under Professor Peter Tait.

Carse graduated in 1903, and received a doctorate in 1908, having attended Emmanuel College, Cambridge from 1904 to 1907 (working at the Cavendish Laboratory).

In November 1904, he was elected as a Fellow of the Royal Society of Edinburgh, his main proposer being Professor George Chrystal.

During the First World War, Carse served in the Royal Arsenal, Woolwich.

Carse spent the majority of his working life lecturing in physics at the University of Edinburg. He retired in 1948. He was an office bearer in several non-academic roles in the university, mainly concerning university finances.

Carse served as the vice president to the Royal Scottish Society of Arts, in 1935/36 and 1946/47, respectively.

He died in Edinburgh on 20 August 1950. His RSE obituary was written by Arthur Melville Clark.

== Other positions held ==
- Convener of Foundation Committee, University of Edinburgh
- Governor, Edinburgh and East of Scotland College of Agriculture
- Governor, Heriot-Watt College

== Publications ==
- Notes on Practical Physics for Junior Students (1926)
