= Arthur Clarke (disambiguation) =

Arthur C. Clarke (1917–2008) was a British science fiction writer, inventor and futurist.

Arthur Clarke may also refer to:

- Sir Arthur Clarke, 6th Baronet (1715–1806) of the Clarke baronets
- Arthur Clarke (priest) (1848–1932), Archdeacon of Lancaster and of Rochdale
- Artie Clarke (1865–1949), American professional baseballist
- Arthur Grenfell Clarke (1906–1993), government minister in Hong Kong
- Arthur A. Clarke (1917–2009), Jesuit translator of Gauss' Disquisitiones Arithmeticae
- Arthur Clarke (sport shooter) (1921–2014), British sport shooter

== See also ==
- Arthur Clark (disambiguation)
- Arthur Childs-Clarke (1905–1980), English cricketer
- Clarke, a surname
