= List of The Joseph Smith Papers episodes =

The Joseph Smith Papers, a documentary television series produced by Ronald O. Barney and the Larry H. Miller Communications Corporation, premiered on KJZZ-TV in the Salt Lake City market. The series consists of a total of 94 episodes produced in two seasons; the episodes are approximately 30 minutes long each (with the exception of the 55 minute pilot). The first season consists of 51 episodes, plus the pilot, while the second season has 42 episodes.

The series pilot aired November 5, 2007, but the first season did not begin airing until early in 2008; it concluded on February 22, 2009. The second season began airing soon after the first season's finale in 2009; it ended later that same year. Following the completion of each season, the episodes were rebroadcast on BYU-TV (to receive exposure outside the Salt Lake City market). Both seasons were later released on region-all DVD.

== Series overview ==
Season	Episodes	Originally released		DVD release date
Season	Episodes	First released	Last released	DVD release date
1	52	2008	February 22, 2009	October 2009
2	42	2009	2009	August 2010

== Episode list ==
- The first column refers to the episode's number in the overall series.
- The second column refers to the episode's number in that particular season.

=== Season 1: 2008–2009 ===
No. overall	No. in series	Title	Directed by	Written by	Original release date
1	0 (Pilot)	"The Joseph Smith Papers: A Television Forward [sic; should read "Foreword"]"	Unknown	Dean Paynter	November 5, 2007
This episode introduces Joseph Smith, gives an overview of the Joseph Smith Papers Project, and provides perspectives from prominent scholars on the historical influence of the Prophet and the importance of publishing his papers.
2	1	"The Joseph Smith Papers"	TBD	Glenn Rawson	2008
This episode describes in more depth the organization and significance of The Joseph Smith Papers. Ronald K. Esplin, managing editor of the Papers, discusses the different types of documents-journals, histories, revelations, and administrative and legal documents—that will be included in the project.
3	2	"Joseph Smith's New England Beginnings"	TBA	Glenn Rawson	TBA
This episode offers an in-depth look at the family history that helped shape Joseph Smith-from the pilgrims of Mayflower to the Revolutionary War soldiers to the regular farmers—including his parents and grandparents.
4	3	"Joseph Smith's America"	TBA	Glenn Rawson	TBA
This episode explores the historical context of the United States in 1805, when Joseph Smith was born.
5	4	"Joseph Smith's Palmyra"	TBA	Glenn Rawson	TBA
Joseph Smith grew up in the small town of Palmyra, New York; this episode provides a window into the lives of his family during their time there.
6	5	"The Setting of the First Vision"	TBA	Glenn Rawson	TBA
This episode sets the stage for the first event in what would become the Restoration of the gospel: the appearance of God the Father and Jesus Christ to the fourteen-year-old Joseph Smith.
7	6	"The First Vision"	TBA	Glenn Rawson	TBA
Joseph Smith's 1820 vision of God and Jesus Christ is examined, and his different accounts compared in this episode.
8	7	"The Coming Forth of the Book of Mormon"	TBA	Glenn Rawson	TBA
Examines the story of the records from which Joseph Smith translated the Book of Mormon—how he obtained them and how he set about translating them.
9	8	"Harmony, Pennsylvania"	TBA	Glenn Rawson	TBA
Discusses the significance of Harmony, Pennsylvania and the events that took place there. Including meeting his wife, the birth and death of his first child, also the translation of a significant portion of the Book of Mormon.
10	9	"Restoration of the Priesthoods"	TBA	Glenn Rawson	TBA
Examines how, when, where, and by whom the Priesthood was restored to the earth.
11	10	"The Joseph Smith Papers-Roundtable 1"	TBA	Glenn Rawson	TBA
A roundtable discussion, chaired by Ronald K. Esplin, managing editor of The Joseph Smith Papers, features members of the Papers staff explaining why this project has significance to people both in and out of the LDS Church.
12	11	"The Joseph Smith Papers-Roundtable 2"	TBA	Glenn Rawson	TBA
In the second roundtable, members of the Joseph Smith Papers Project staff describe the day-to-day work of producing the Papers-from acquisition of documents to transcription to editorial policies-and share things they've learned.
13	12	"The Book of Mormon Translation"	TBA	Glenn Rawson	TBA
Scholars present textual evidence that helps give an idea of what the actual process of translating the Book of Mormon may have been like.
14	13	"Book of Mormon Printing and Editions"	TBA	Glenn Rawson	TBA
Scholars discuss the publication of the first edition of the Book of Mormon, including the process of printing and the local reaction to the book's publication.
15	14	"Lucy Mack Smith, Joseph Smith's First Biographer"	TBA	Glenn Rawson	TBA
Discusses the biography of Joseph Smith written by Lucy Mack Smith, begun in 1844 after his death.
16	15	"Joseph Smith and the History of the Church"	TBA	Glenn Rawson	TBA
Scholar's discuss the early instruction to Joseph Smith that he should keep a record of the Church, and his effort to obey that command.
17	16	"The Journals of Joseph Smith"	TBA	Glenn Rawson	TBA
Discussion of the journals of Joseph Smith, what they reveal, and the human side of Joseph Smith.
18	17	"Oliver Cowdery, the Second Elder"	TBA	Glenn Rawson	TBA
Oliver Cowdery was at the center of the early Church, from his beginnings as a scribe for the Book of Mormon translation to his role as second elder of the Church until his disaffection, excommunication, and re-baptism. In this episode, scholars discuss Cowdery, his relationship to Joseph Smith, and his place in church history.
19	18	"Contemporaries of Joseph Smith"	TBA	Glenn Rawson	TBA
This episode offers descriptions of Joseph Smith from his contemporaries-within the Church and without-as well as perspectives on his influence from several modern scholars.
20	19	"Joseph Smith's Leg Operation"	TBA	Glenn Rawson	TBA
Doctor Nathan Smith was perhaps the only doctor in the United States who could have saved young Joseph Smith's leg when he contracted Osteomyelitis (bone infection) in 1813. This episode explores Joseph's childhood illness and the remarkable physician who treated it.
21	20	"The Joseph Smith Translation (JST), Part 1"	TBA	Glenn Rawson	TBA
In July 1833, Joseph Smith completed his inspired revision of the Bible. That text, which was never published in his lifetime, was lost to the Church for more than a century. In this episode, Robert J. Matthews discusses the Joseph Smith Translation and his role in bringing it to light.
22	21	"The Joseph Smith Translation (JST), Part 2"	TBA	Glenn Rawson	TBA
Joseph Smith's Translation of the Bible was one of the most significant endeavors of his life. This episode explores the divine instruction to revise the Bible, the process of translation, and the storied history of the JST Translation.
23	22	"The Letters of Joseph and Emma Smith"	TBA	Glenn Rawson	TBA
Joseph and Emma Smith spent much of their seventeen-year marriage apart, writing letters to each other while Joseph was traveling or imprisoned. This episode delves into the surviving letters of this couple.
24	23	"The Revelations of Joseph Smith"	TBA	Glenn Rawson	TBA
The belief in continuing revelation espoused by Joseph Smith set him apart from other Christians in his day, and it continues to distinguish the Church he founded. This episode discusses these divine communications and how they came to be in their present form in the Doctrine and Covenants.
25	24	"The Organization of the Church"	TBA	Glenn Rawson	TBA
The Church of Christ was officially organized in a meeting on April 6, 1830. This episode revisits that meeting, which provided the organizational foundation upon which the Church has built ever since.
26	25	"Kirtland Beginnings"	TBA	Glenn Rawson	TBA
Kirtland, Ohio, was the first designated gathering place for members of the fledgling Church of Christ. This episode focuses on Kirtland-its history, its problems, and its importance in Church history.
27	26	"Kirtland and the Kirtland Temple, the House of the Lord"	TBA	Glenn Rawson	TBA
The Kirtland Temple, the first temple constructed in this dispensation, was built through the sacrifices of countless Church members. This episode explores some of the hardships of the Kirtland period, as well as the purpose of and plans of the House of the Lord.
28	27	"The Kirtland Temple: Endowment of Power and Solemn Assembly."	TBA	Glenn Rawson	TBA
The site of remarkable sermons, visions, and pentecostal experiences, the Kirtland Temple was the focal point of the Church through much of the 1830s. This episode looks at the events that took place in the temple and how those events shaped the Church.
29	28	"The Building of Zion"	TBA	Glenn Rawson	TBA
Jackson County, Missouri, was on the edge of the American frontier when Joseph Smith arrived there in 1831, and received a revelation that it was to be the location of Zion, the New Jerusalem. This episode focuses on Zion, both as a concept and as a physical place.
30	29	"Zion's Camp"	TBA	Glenn Rawson	TBA
After the Latter-day Saints were expelled from Jackson County, Missouri, in the winter of 1833, Joseph Smith gathered a band of men to restore the Jackson County Saints to their lands. This episode focuses on that expeditionary force, later known as Zion's Camp.
31	30	"The Kirtland Crisis"	TBA	Glenn Rawson	TBA
Between building the Kirtland Temple, providing lands for immigrant Saints, and many other endeavors, the Church was deeply in debt by 1837. This episode discusses how economic woes and the failure of the Kirtland Safety Society helped precipitate a crisis in Kirtland.
32	31	"Joseph Smith and the Law: Part 1, New York and Ohio"	TBA	Glenn Rawson	TBA
Joseph Smith once wrote that he believed in "obeying, honoring, and sustaining the law." During his lifetime, however, numerous lawsuits were brought against him. This episode discusses a few of those encounters with the law, focusing on the Prophet's time in New York and Ohio.
33	32	"The Mormons in Far West and Northern Missouri"	TBA	Glenn Rawson	TBA
After their expulsion from Jackson County, Missouri, the Latter-day Saints found themselves unwelcome in other Missouri counties as well. Eventually, they were given exclusive permission to settle in Caldwell County where they built the city of Far West. This episode discusses the experiences of the Saints in northern Missouri.
34	33	"The Mormon War"	TBA	Glenn Rawson	TBA
Tensions between the Latter-day Saints and the other citizens of Missouri were already mounting in 1838. After conflicts and aggression from both sides, Governor Lilburn W. Boggs issued the infamous Extermination Order, directing that the Saints be "exterminated or driven from the state." This episode looks at the causes and the events of what became known as the Mormon War.
35	34	"Liberty Jail"	TBA	Glenn Rawson	TBA
Arrested and charged with treason, Joseph Smith was incarcerated in a series of Missouri jails to await trial. This episode explores Joseph's experience in Liberty Jail-why he was there, what he endured, and how the experience changed him.
36	35	"The Mormon Exodus from Missouri"	TBA	Glenn Rawson	TBA
In late 1838, members of the Missouri state militia arrived in Far West to execute the Extermination Order. They drove the Saints from their homes and the state. This episode examines the Saints' winter exodus and their arrival in Quincy, Illinois.
37	36	"The Mission of the Twelve to England"	TBA	Glenn Rawson	TBA
The Quorum of the Twelve Apostles arrived in England in 1840 to preach the gospel to the people of that country. This episode discusses that mission, which not only increased Church membership, but also refined the leadership of the Twelve.
38	37	"Joseph Smith and the Law: Part 2, Missouri"	TBA	Glenn Rawson	TBA
In addition to intimidation and armed conflicts, Joseph Smith and the Saints faced significant legal challenges during their time in Missouri. This episode examines those challenges.
39	38	"Nauvoo Beginnings"	TBA	Glenn Rawson	TBA
After taking temporary refuge in Quincy, Illinois, Church leaders authorized the purchase of land in Commerce, Illinois, which would serve as a new gathering place and later be renamed Nauvoo. This episode examines how the swampy land of Commerce was transformed into the City Beautiful.
40	39	"Joseph Smith Goes to Washington"	TBA	Glenn Rawson	TBA
Believing that the constitutional rights of the Latter-day Saints had been violated when they were driven from their lands in Missouri, Joseph Smith traveled to the nation's capital to seek redress from the federal government. This episode focuses on that effort and on Smith's experience with Martin Van Buren, president of the United States.
41	40	"The Sermons of Joseph Smith"	TBA	Glenn Rawson	TBA
Unlike many Christian ministers of his day, Joseph Smith delivered his sermons extemporaneously, not from prepared texts. Partly as a result of that, few records of Smith's public sermons exist today. This episode discusses some of the few extant accounts of sermons, as well as other reasons for the scarcity of such texts.
42	41	"The Nauvoo Temple and Nauvoo House"	TBA	Glenn Rawson	TBA
In 1840 and 1841, Joseph Smith gave direction that the Saints should build a temple in Nauvoo. But he also mandated that a second building—the Nauvoo House—be built. This episode explores the purpose and construction of those two buildings.
43	42	"The Book of Abraham"	TBA	Glenn Rawson	TBA
Having heard of Joseph Smith as a man rumored to be able to translate ancient texts, Michael Chandler arrived in Kirtland in 1835 with four mummies and some Egyptian papyri for display and sale. Joseph purchased Chandler's wares and translated the text of the Book of Abraham from the papyri. This episode discusses the processes of acquisition, translation, and publication of the book.
44	43	"Developments in Nauvoo"	TBA	Glenn Rawson	TBA
For many reasons, the Nauvoo period was crucial to the development of the Church of Jesus Christ of Latter-day Saints as it is known today. This episode explores the evolution of doctrines, beliefs, revelations, and ordinances in Nauvoo.
45	44	"Foundations of the Women's Relief Society"	TBA	Glenn Rawson	TBA
What began as a women's sewing society to provide clothing for the men working on the Nauvoo Temple became a multifaceted organization. This episode explores the foundation and early history of the Relief Society.
46	45	"Joseph Smith and the Law: Part 3, Illinois and Extradition"	TBA	Glenn Rawson	TBA
The charge of treason that had been brought against Joseph Smith in Missouri was officially dismissed in August 1840. Despite this Governor Boggs and his successor, Thomas Reynolds, petitioned the states of Illinois for the extradition of Joseph Smith to Missouri. This episode explores the ensuing legal battle.
47	46	"The Beginnings of International Mormonism"	TBA	Glenn Rawson	TBA
From early on, Joseph Smith envisioned the preaching of the gospel as an international endeavor. This episode looks at the first efforts to create an international church.
48	47	"The Climax of Nauvoo, Part 1"	TBA	Glenn Rawson	TBA
Joseph Smith's continued legal troubles and the introduction of the doctrine of plural marriage bred dissent inside the church in Nauvoo. This episode explores the mounting tension surrounding these issues, with emphasis on the reaction to plural marriage.
49	48	"The Climax of Nauvoo, Part 2"	TBA	Glenn Rawson	TBA
In the months prior to his death, Joseph Smith sent a missionary force throughout the United States to promote him as a candidate for president of the United States. In Nauvoo, he gave final instructions on priesthood organization and temple ordinances. This episode discusses the last months of the Prophet's life-the capstone of his ministry.
50	49	"The Martyrdom of Joseph Smith and Hyrum Smith"	TBA	Glenn Rawson	TBA
On June 27, 1844, Joseph Smith and his brother Hyrum were shot and killed in an attack on the jailhouse at Carthage, Illinois. This episode discusses the martyrdom and the events leading up to it, including the destruction of the Nauvoo Expositor.
51	50	"The Martyrdom: Aftermath"	TBA	Glenn Rawson	TBA
The death of Joseph Smith was met by the Saints with confusion, disbelief, and profound grief. The loss of their founder and leader precipitated a crisis of leadership among the Saints, with several parties claiming the right and authority to lead the Church. This episode discusses the unfolding of this crisis in the days, weeks, and months after the martyrdom.
52	51	"The Last Days of Nauvoo"	Unknown	Glenn Rawson	February 22, 2009
In August 1844, most of the Latter-day Saints voted for the Quorum of the Twelve apostles, led by Brigham Young, to take over leadership of the Church. This final episode of the season explores the crisis of succession after the death of Joseph Smith and the eventual exodus from Nauvoo.

=== Season 2: 2009 ===
No. overall	No. in series	Title	Directed by	Written by	Original release date
53	1	"The Persona of Joseph Smith"	TBA	TBA	TBA
Joseph Smith, no ordinary figure, has been largely ignored or remains elusive by modern observers. In the first episode of the second season, the image, personality, character, and physicality of Joseph Smith are presented, with discussion of his appearance, influence, and the culture in which he lived.
54	2	"Impressions of a Prophet, Part 1: Joseph Smith through the Years"	TBA	TBA	TBA
The influence of Joseph Smith has provoked much discussion through the years. This episode introduces some of the historical impressions of Joseph Smith and discusses the continued interest in his life by describing the major historical works that have been produced about him from the early nineteenth century to the present.
55	3	"Impressions of a Prophet, Part 2"	TBA	TBA	TBA
Episode three describes the historical importance of Joseph Smith and the scholarship, both secular and religious, that has been produced about him. It concludes by introducing the role of The Church of Jesus Christ of Latter-day Saints in this scholarship through the Joseph Smith Papers Project.
56	4	"The Joseph Smith Tour, Part 1: New England"	TBA	TBA	TBA
In this episode we begin our Joseph Smith tour by following the Smith family's settling and travels in New England, guided by LDS scholars of this period.
57	5	"The Joseph Smith Tour, Part 2: New York and Pennsylvania"	TBA	TBA	TBA
The second leg of the Joseph Smith tour - guided by LDS scholars, this episode describes Church historic sites in New York and Pennsylvania and the events involving Joseph Smith that happened there.
58	6	"The Joseph Smith Tour, Part 3: Ohio"	TBA	TBA	TBA
The third leg of the Joseph Smith tour, this episode describes Church historic sites associated with Joseph Smith in Ohio and the events that occurred there, including receiving Doctrine and Covenants 76 ("The Vision"), and the promise of the Endowment of Power from on High.
59	7	"The Joseph Smith Tour, Part 4: Missouri"	TBA	TBA	TBA
The fourth leg of the Joseph Smith tour, the journey is continued in this episode through the Missouri period and chronicles some of the most acute persecutions and apostasies in Church history, while also showing the development of Church leadership and Joseph Smith's vision of the building of Zion.
60	8	"The Joseph Smith Tour, Part 5: Illinois"	TBA	TBA	TBA
The final leg of the Joseph Smith tour visits sites associated with the Prophet Joseph's - and the Church's - maturation in Illinois. Joseph Smith's work of building cities, temples, and the Church's women's organization, as well as his domestic life, are described as the prelude to his martyrdom in Carthage, Illinois, in 1844.
61	9	"The Family of Joseph Smith, Part 1"	TBA	TBA	TBA
This episode begins a three-part series about the family of Joseph Smith by taking a closer look at his parents, Joseph Smith Sr. and Lucy Mack Smith.
62	10	"The Family of Joseph Smith, Part 2"	TBA	TBA	TBA
In this episode, the second in the series on Joseph Smith's family, Church scholars describe Lucy Mack Smith's reaction to the martyrdom of her sons, Joseph and Hyrum. The episode concludes with a description of Joseph Smith's brothers and sisters in relation to the LDS Church.
63	11	"The Family of Joseph Smith, Part 3"	TBA	TBA	TBA
This episode concludes the series on the family of Joseph Smith by discussing what happened to Emma Smith and her and Joseph's children after Joseph's death.
64	12	"Teachings of Joseph Smith, Part 1"	TBA	TBA	TBA
This episode begins a two-part series on the teachings of Joseph Smith, beginning with late nineteenth and early twentieth century compilations of his teachings, and concluding with a discussion of the process of gathering material for the LDS Church's manual about the Prophet, Teachings of the Presidents of the Church: Joseph Smith.
65	13	"Teachings of Joseph Smith, Part 2"	TBA	TBA	TBA
This episode concludes the two-part series on the teachings of Joseph Smith by examining the production of the LDS Church's manual about Joseph Smith, Teachings of the Presidents of the Church: Joseph Smith, including commentary from the editors of the manual about how they see Joseph Smith.
66	14	"The Early Music of Mormonism, Part 1"	TBA	TBA	TBA
This episode begins a two-part series on the music of the Church at its beginnings, from Emma Smith's calling to produce a hymnal to discussions about the differences in hymn singing from those early days to now.
67	15	"The Early Music of Mormonism, Part 2"	TBA	TBA	TBA
This episode concludes the two-part series on the early music of the LDS Church, discussing collections of hymns in the early Church, the role of music in the Prophet's life, and the beginning of LDS-specific hymn writing.
68	16	"Joseph Smith's First Vision, Part 1: Importance"	TBA	TBA	TBA
This episode begins a five-part series on Joseph Smith's First Vision, focusing here on the importance of the First Vision theologically and historically.
69	17	"Joseph Smith's First Vision, Part 2: The First Account, 1832"	TBA	TBA	TBA
This episode, the second in a five-part series on Joseph Smith's First Vision, examines the first account of the vision from 1832.
70	18	"Joseph Smith's First Vision, Part 3: Other Accounts"	TBA	TBA	TBA
This episode, the third in a five-part series on Joseph Smith's First Vision, describes other accounts of the vision.
71	19	"Joseph Smith's First Vision, Part 4: The Story"	TBA	TBA	TBA
This episode, the fourth in a five-part series on Joseph Smith's First Vision, discusses the basic elements of the first part of the account, up to Joseph Smith's prayer, including variations in the account and what they mean.
72	20	"Joseph Smith's First Vision, Part 5: The Story Continued"	TBA	TBA	TBA
This episode is the final episode of a five-part series on Joseph Smith's First Vision, and takes up the story where part four left off, with Joseph's visitation by God the Father and Jesus Christ, and discusses what Joseph learned, and what the First Vision set in motion.
73	21	"Revelations and Translations, Part 1: The Book of Mormon"	TBA	TBA	TBA
This episode begins a six-part series on the revelations received and translations made by Joseph Smith. This episode begins the story of the translation of the Book of Mormon, from Moroni's first visit to Joseph receiving the golden plates.
74	22	"Revelations and Translations, Part 2: The Book of Mormon Continued"	TBA	TBA	TBA
This episode is the second in a six-part series on the revelations received and translations made by Joseph Smith, and continues the story of the translation of the Book of Mormon, from the initial work on translation, through the loss of the 116 pages of manuscript, to the publication of the Book of Mormon in 1830.
75	23	"Revelations and Translations, Part 3: The Book of Mormon, Literary Composition"	TBA	TBA	TBA
This episode is the third in a six-part series on the revelations received and translations made by Joseph Smith, focusing on the composition of the Book of Mormon, including literary criticism and discoveries in the text.
76	24	"Revelations and Translations, Part 4: The Doctrine and Covenants"	TBA	TBA	TBA
This episode, part four in a six-part series on the revelations received and translations made by Joseph Smith, begins the story of the Doctrine and Covenants by talking about early revelations received by Joseph Smith and how they were collected and published.
77	25	"Revelations and Translations, Part 5: The Doctrine and Covenants Continued"	TBA	TBA	TBA
This episode is part five of a six-part series on the revelations received and translations made by Joseph Smith, and picks up where part four left off, examining how the Book of Commandments became the Doctrine and Covenants, including discussion of noncanonized revelations.
78	26	"Revelations and Translations, Part 6: The Pearl of Great Price"	TBA	TBA	TBA
This episode concludes the six-part series on the revelations received and translations made by Joseph Smith by discussing the collection of scripture known as the Pearl of Great Price, including its original publication in England and subsequent publications and its canonization as LDS scripture.
79	27	"Joseph Smith and His Papers, Part 1"	TBA	TBA	TBA
This episode begins a three-part series on the Joseph Smith Papers project, discussing what the project is, what importance it holds for LDS scholarship in general, and how the first volume in the series, Joseph Smith Papers, Journals, Volume 1: 1832-1839, can be used by interested readers.
80	28	"Joseph Smith and His Papers, Part 2"	TBA	TBA	TBA
This episode, the second in a three-part series on the Joseph Smith Papers project, discusses the role and historical context of the project, the Web site created for the project, and how scholars and other interested readers can use the first volume of the Revelations and Translations series, Manuscript Revelation Books, Facsimile Edition.
81	29	"Joseph Smith and His Papers, Part 3"	TBA	TBA	TBA
This episode concludes the three-part series on the Joseph Smith Papers project by continuing the discussion of the new Revelations and Translations series, including recent scholarship that came from the project.
82	30	"Word of Wisdom: Doctrine and Covenants 89"	TBA	TBA	TBA
This episode discusses Doctrine and Covenants 89, Joseph Smith's revelation titled the "Word of Wisdom," including how it came about, how it has been interpreted, and scholarship about the original text.
83	31	"Joseph Smith, the Statesman"	TBA	TBA	TBA
The world that Joseph Smith lived in was, politically speaking, rough-and-tumble, and it would have been impossible to do what he did without consequences in the larger political world. This episode looks at how Joseph Smith and Mormonism intersected with local and national politics and what religious liberty meant at the time.
84	32	"The Vision: Doctrine and Covenants 76"	TBA	TBA	TBA
Joseph Smith and Sidney Rigdon's 1832 vision, canonized in LDS scripture as Doctrine and Covenants section 76, is recounted in this episodes, which also discusses the theological shift that "The Vision" represents.
85	33	"Epistle from the Liberty Jail: Doctrine and Covenants 121-23"	TBA	TBA	TBA
This episode chronicles the letter that Joseph Smith wrote from Liberty Jail, some parts of which are canonized as sections 121, 122, and 123 of the Doctrine and Covenants, including discussion of the content of the epistle and the doctrinal clarifications and comfort it gave to Joseph Smith and the Church at the time.
86	34	"The Pure Religion of Joseph Smith"	TBA	TBA	TBA
James 1:27 says that "pure religion and undefiled before God and the Father is this, to visit the fatherless and widows in their affliction." This episode examines Joseph Smith's life in the light of this scripture: Did he exemplify James's definition of one living "pure religion"?
87	35	"Early Members, Part 1: Hyrum Smith, A Life of Integrity"	TBA	TBA	TBA
This episode begins a five-part series on prominent early members of the LDS Church, focusing here on Hyrum Smith, Joseph Smith's brother, confidant, and fellow martyr.
88	36	"Early Members, Part 2: The Pratt Brothers, Parley P. and Orson"	TBA	TBA	TBA
This episode is the second in a five-part series on prominent early members of the LDS Church, centered here on the Pratt brothers, Parley P. and Orson, important contributors to the theology and intellectual underpinnings of the Church.
89	37	"Early Members, Part 3: William Clayton and the Knight Family"	TBA	TBA	TBA
This episode is the third in a five-part series on prominent early members of the LDS Church, discussing here William Clayton, one of Joseph Smith's scribes and the writer of the pioneer hymn "Come, Come, Ye Saints," and the Knight family, early supporters both financially and personally.
90	38	"Early Members, Part 4: Martin Harris and the John and Elsa Johnson Family"	TBA	TBA	TBA
This episode is the fourth episode in a five-part series on prominent early members of the LDS Church, focusing here on Martin Harris, whose patronage allowed the Book of Mormon to be printed, and who also became one of the Three Witnesses, and also on the John and Elsa Johnson family, whose home hosted "The Vision" (D&C 76), Joseph Smith and Sidney Rigdon's revelation concerning the three degrees of glory.
91	39	"Early Members, Part 5: The Snows, Eliza R. and Lorenzo"	TBA	TBA	TBA
This episode concludes the five-part series on prominent early members of the LDS Church by discussing the contribution of Lorenzo Snow and his sister, Eliza R. Snow. Lorenzo, who had early success in the Church as a missionary in England, would become the fifth president of the Church; his sister, Eliza, would become known for presiding over the Relief Society, for her hymn writing, and for her contributions to the theology of the Latter-day Saints.
92	40	"Joseph Smith Papers, Question and Answer Forum, Part 1"	TBA	TBA	TBA
This episode begins a two-part series of questions and answers from scholars involved in the Joseph Smith Papers project.
93	41	"Joseph Smith Papers, Question and Answer Forum, Part 2"	TBA	TBA	TBA
This episode concludes a two-part series of questions and answers from scholars involved in the Joseph Smith Papers project.
94	42	"Joseph Smith Papers, Finale: A Tribute to the Project Benefactor, Larry H. Miller"	TBA	TBA	TBA
This episode, the final episode of Season Two, pays tribute to the late Larry H. Miller, businessman and sponsor of the Joseph Smith Papers project, who died in 2009.
