= The Joseph Smith Papers (TV series) =

- Series title card
- Genre: History; Mormon studies Documentary
- Written by: Glenn Rawson
- Narrated by: Glenn Rawson
- Country of origin: United States
- Original language: English
- No. of seasons: 2
- No. of episodes: 94 (list of episodes)

Production
- Executive producers: Ronald O. Barney; Larry H. Miller
- Producer: Glenn Rawson
- Cinematography: Dennis Lyman
- Editor: Rick Prather
- Running time: 30 minutes 55 minutes (Pilot)
- Production company: Larry H. Miller Communications Corporation

Original release
- Network: KJZZ-TV
- Release: 2008 – 2009

Related
- History of the Saints

The Joseph Smith Papers: Television Documentary Series is a documentary television series produced by Ronald O. Barney and the Larry H. Miller Communications Corporation. The series documented the creation of, and work involved in, the Joseph Smith Papers Project. It also discussed the history of Joseph Smith, the founder and first prophet of the Church of Jesus Christ of Latter-day Saints (LDS Church), as well as the early history of the Latter Day Saint movement.

== Production ==
The history of the Joseph Smith Papers Project began with the work of Dean C. Jessee. Jessee, along with LDS Historian Leonard J. Arrington, wanted to collect and publish all the known works of Joseph Smith, so they could be more easily accessed by scholars and the public. His first attempts at the project were The Personal Writings of Joseph Smith, in 1984, and the two volume Papers of Joseph Smith, the first in 1989 and the second in 1992. In 2001, Jessee's project became a joint venture between Brigham Young University and the LDS Church Archives, and was named the Joseph Smith Papers Project. A large amount of funding for the project was donated by Larry H. and Gail Miller the owners of KJZZ-TV, the station which would later air the television series. The project was then moved from BYU to the LDS Church Archives in Salt Lake City, Utah.

As the project progressed, and the time neared for the publication of the first volume, the Larry H. Miller Communications Corporation decided to produce an hour-long introduction to the project, to air on KJZZ-TV. This introduction aired 5 November 2007, and became the pilot for the series. Eventually it was decided to create a weekly series, to document the project, and to discuss the history of Joseph Smith using original documents. The pilot would differ from the remaining episodes of the series because of changes to the production team and broadcast format. All the episodes were produced in cooperation with the LDS Church Historical Department.

The first season of the series premiered early in 2008 and concluded on 22 February 2009. The second season began airing in 2009 and ended later that year. Following the completion of each season, the episodes were rebroadcast on BYU-TV (to receive exposure outside the Salt Lake City market). Both seasons were later released on region-all DVD.

== Plot synopsis and episode list ==
The first season documented the creation of, and work involved in, the Joseph Smith Papers Project. It also discussed the history of Joseph Smith, the founder and first prophet of the LDS Church (using original documents); beginning with his ancestral roots and ending with the condition of the Church following his death. The second season covered many of the same topics, but went into more detail, using a topical approach versus the chronological approach of the first season. The second season also covered the potentially troubling issues in Joseph Smith's history more thoroughly.

== See also ==
- The Joseph Smith Papers
