= The Speculative Society =

Scottish Enlightenment society

The Speculative Society is a Scottish Enlightenment society dedicated to public speaking and literary composition, founded in 1764. It was mainly, but not exclusively, an Edinburgh University student organisation. The formal purpose of the Society is as a place for social interchange and for practising of professional competency in rhetoric, argument, and the presentation of papers among fellow members. While continuing to meet in its rooms in the university's Old College, it has no formal links to the university.

== History ==
The founding group, in November 1764, consisted of John Bonar, the younger, John Bruce, William Creech, Henry Mackenzie, and a Mr Belches of Invermay. They were encouraged by William Robertson. A split occurred in the Society in 1794, when Francis Jeffrey and Walter Scott urged the inclusion of contemporary politics in the scope of permitted debating topics. At this period, of political repression, the Society was a venue appreciated by young Whigs. They included Henry Brougham and Francis Horner. The National Library of Australia holds a rare limited edition (50 on large paper, 250 on small paper) copy of The History of the Speculative Society (1845) printed for the Society. Apparently subsequent editions were considered (1864, 1892) but it was not until 1905 that a further history was produced by a Committee of the Society, including a detailed list of ordinary members and Honorary members. The Speculative has thus now produced four Histories over its 250 year existence. - 1st History (1845) - 2nd History (1905) - 3rd History (1968) - 4th History (2024)

== Halls in Old College ==
The Society continues to meet in the rooms set aside for it when Edinburgh University's Old College was built. The Society was not gifted these rooms. It owned a meeting house on the ground earmarked for Old College. In return for giving up its meeting house so that Old College could be built, the Society was granted permanent accommodation in the newly built College. The A-listed rooms were designed by Robert Adam and fitted out by William Henry Playfair.

== Influence ==
The Edinburgh Review (second series) was founded in 1802 by a group of essayists who knew each other first in the milieu of the Speculative Society.

The University of Cambridge had a Speculative Society in the early years of the 19th century; it was one of the clubs that merged to form the Cambridge Union Society. Around 1825 Utilitarians and Owenites in London engaged in debates, and a formal Debating Society consciously modelled on the Speculative Society of Edinburgh was set up by John Stuart Mill. It was ambitious, but proved short-lived.

== Modern activities ==
The functioning of this private society as at 2003 was described by Scottish judges as a group of 30 individuals (at that time all men) joining after private invitation and subject to a blackballing procedure; ordinary membership for three years of academic study required the production of three essay papers and the presentation of them for approximately 15 minutes duration for the purposes of a debate, which is voted on; members are offered the opportunity for dinners with occasional guests; after the period of ordinary membership has been completed, the member becomes an extraordinary member with the right to attend debates if desired. The organisation was in practice limited to membership by men through until 2015, when women were permitted to become members. Judges when trying cases are not required to declare to the litigants whether they are members of this society; the society was held to be “neither secret nor sinister”; membership could not reasonably be thought to influence the outcome of a case.

== Membership ==
Past members of the Speculative Society of Edinburgh include:

- William Creech
- John Bruce
- Henry Mackenzie
- Henry Brougham, 1st Baron Brougham and Vaux
- Arthur Melville Clark, President of the Society 1926-29
- Lord Cullen
- William Douglas of Almorness
- Rev Henry Duncan
- Alexander Colquhoun-Stirling-Murray-Dunlop
- Sir Nicholas Fairbairn
- Cyrus Griffin
- Francis Horner
- John Playfair
- Sir Walter Scott
- William Shee
- Robert Louis Stevenson
- Anthony Todd Thomson
- Robert Fitzroy Bell
- Sir William Turner
- Arthur Balfour
- Alec Douglas-Home
- Angus Grossart

Royal Members

- Prince Philip, Duke of Edinburgh
- Anne, Princess Royal
- Prince Alfred, Duke of Edinburgh

== See also ==
- The Lunar Society of Birmingham
- The Diagnostic Society of Edinburgh
- The College Historical Society
