= John Bruce (historiographer) =

Scottish academic, politician and historiographer

John Bruce of Grangehill and Falkland FRS FRSE (1744–1826) was a Scottish academic, politician and historiographer to the East India Company.

== Life ==
He was born in Fife in 1744 or 1745, the son of Andrew Bruce (1710–1761) and Jean Squyre (1724–1794).

While he had himself declared heir male of the family of Bruce of Earlshall, Bruce inherited from his father Andrew Bruce, a shipmaster, only the property of Grangehill, near Kinghorn, Fifeshire. He studied at the University of Edinburgh, where he was then appointed assistant professor of logic to John Stevenson, and professor of moral philosophy.

Tutor to Robert Saunders Dundas, the son of Henry Dundas, 1st Viscount Melville, Bruce was rewarded by a share, with Sir James Hunter Blair, 1st Baronet of the reversion of the patent of king's printer and stationer for Scotland; and was appointed keeper of the state paper office, secretary for the Latin language to the Privy Council, and official historiographer to the East India Company from 1801.

He was Member of Parliament for Mitchell, Cornwall, from February 1809 till July 1814, and for a short time Secretary to the Board of Control, under Robert Dundas.

Bruce was an elected a fellow of the Royal Society of London in 1791. In 1783 he was a founding member of the Royal Society of Edinburgh. He was also a fellow of the Royal Society of Göttingen. In 1764 he founded the Speculative Society.

He died at his home of Nuthill House in Fife, on 16 April 1826.

== Family ==
His niece Margaret Bruce (1788–1869) married Onesiphorus Tyndall, thereafter titled Tyndall-Bruce (1790–1855). He rose to be Deputy Lieutenant of Fife.

== Works ==
Bruce's works included some privately printed for confidential us the government:

- First Principles of Philosophy, Edinburgh, 1780, 1781, 1785.
- Elements of the Science of Ethics, or the Principles of Natural Philosophy, London, 1786.
- Historical View of Plans for the Government of British India, 1793.
- Review of the Events and Treaties which established the Balance of Power in Europe, and the Balance of Trade in favour of Great Britain, London, 1796.
- Report on the Arrangements which were made for the internal Defence of these Kingdoms when Spain by its Armada projected the Invasion and Conquest of England, London, 1798; privately printed for the use of ministers at the time of a threatened French invasion. William Pitt based his measures of the provisional cavalry and army of reserve on this report.
- Report on the Events and Circumstances which produced the Union of the Kingdoms of England and Scotland; on the effects of this great National Event on the reciprocal interests of both Kingdoms; and on the political and commercial influence of Great Britain in the Balance of Power in Europe, 2 vols., London [1799]. These papers were collected for the Duke of Portland, then secretary of state, when the union between Great Britain and Ireland came under consideration.
- Report on the Arrangements which have been adopted in former periods, when France threatened Invasions of Britain or Ireland, to frustrate the designs of the enemy by attacks on his foreign possessions or European ports, by annoying his coasts, and by destroying his equipments, London [1801], privately printed for the government.
- Annals of the East India Company from their establishment by the Charter of Queen Elizabeth, 1600, to the union of the London and English East India Company, 1707–8, 3 vols., London, 1810.
- Report on the Renewal of the Company's Exclusive Privileges of Trade for twenty years from March 1794, London, 1811.
- Speech in the Committee of the House of Commons on India Affairs, London, 1813.

== Notes ==
Attribution

This article incorporates text from a publication now in the public domain: Stephen, Leslie, ed. (1886). "Bruce, John (1745-1826)". Dictionary of National Biography. Vol. 7. London: Smith, Elder & Co.
