= Ronald W. Walker =

American historian (1939 – 2016)

- Born: Ronald Warren Walker; October 12, 1939; Missoula, Montana
- Died: May 9, 2016 (aged 76)
- Education: Brigham Young University (B.S., M.A.); Stanford University; University of Utah (PhD)
- Occupation: Professor
- Employer: Brigham Young University (1980– )
- Spouse: Nelani Midgley Walker

Ronald Warren Walker (1939 – May 9, 2016) was an American historian of the Latter Day Saint movement and a professor at Brigham Young University (BYU) and president of the Mormon History Association. His work, acclaimed by the Mormon History Association, dealt with the Godbeites, the Utah War, and the Mountain Meadows Massacre, among other topics.

== Biography ==
Walker was born in Missoula, Montana, and raised in Iowa and the San Joaquin Valley of California. He graduated from high school in Bakersfield, California.

Walker attended BYU, where he received a Bachelor of Science in 1961 and a Master of Arts in 1965. He received a Master of Science from Stanford University in 1968, and a Ph.D. from the University of Utah in 1977, writing his dissertation on the Godbeites. Walker later developed the ideas in the thesis into Wayward Saints: The Godbeites and Brigham Young. During his graduate studies, Walker had worked in the Institute of Religion of the Church of Jesus Christ of Latter-day Saints (LDS Church) in Salt Lake City. He joined the LDS Church Historical Department under Leonard Arrington in 1976. In 1980, he was transferred to BYU to become a professor of history and inaugural member of the Joseph Fielding Smith Institute for Church History. He later served as a senior research fellow at the Smith Institute and acting director of the Charles Redd Center for Western Studies. He was president of the Mormon History Association during 1991–92.

During his career, Walker wrote or edited eight books and dozens of journal articles including Massacre at Mountain Meadows, Wayward Saints: The Godbeites and Brigham Young. At the time of his death on May 9, 2016, Walker was working on a biography on Brigham Young and a multi-volume work on Heber J. Grant. Of his death, LDS Church historian Richard E. Turley stated, "[Mormon and Utah history] have lost one of their finest and most nuanced narrators." Benjamin E. Park stated that Walker's expertise was in analyzing social dynamics and taking into account multiple viewpoints, especially in Mountain Meadows Massacre, which Park described as a "watershed in the LDS Church's historical conscience." Walker's work on the Utah War showed the politics, social contexts, and human flaws behind the conflict.

Walker and his wife, Nelani Midgley, had seven children.

== Awards ==
Walker has received several awards from the Mormon History Association. He received the Leonard Arrington award for lifelong service as a historian in 1983. He received the best book award in 1999 for Wayward Saints: The Godbeites and Brigham Young and in 2009 with his co-authors for Mountain Meadows Massacre. He received the award for best bibliography in 2010, the best article award in 1989, 2003, 2004, and 2005, and an award for best manuscript submitted to the Journal of Mormon History in 1993. He received a special citation in 2001. He received the Dale L. Morgan award for best article published in Utah Historical Quarterly.

== Writings ==
Walker was widely published in the field of Mormon history and historian Leonard Arrington called him "one of the church's most sophisticated writers."

The following is a partial list of Walker's writings and publications:

- Walker, Ronald W. (1977). The Godbeite Protest in the Making of Modern Utah (dissertation). Salt Lake City, Utah: Department of History, University of Utah..
- Wayward Saints: The Godbeites and Brigham Young, Urbana, Illinois: University of Illinois Press, 1998, ISBN 0-252-02378-1. (Republished by the University of Utah in 2009)
- Dant, Doris R. (1999), Nearly Everything Imaginable: The Everyday Life of Utah's Mormon Pioneers, Provo, UT: Brigham Young University Press, ISBN 978-0-8425-2397-4.
- Allen, James B.; Walker, Ronald W.; Whittaker, David J. (2000), Studies in Mormon History, 1830-1997: An Indexed Bibliography, Urbana, Illinois: University of Illinois Press, ISBN 0-252-02565-2.
- Walker, Ronald W.; Whittaker, David J.; Allen, James B. (2001), Mormon History, Urbana, Illinois: University of Illinois Press, ISBN 0-252-02619-5.
- Qualities That Count: Heber J. Grant as Businessman, Missionary and Apostle, vol. 43, BYU Studies, 2004, ISBN 0-8425-2550-5.
- Neilson, Reid L.; Walker, Ronald W., eds. (2006), Reflections of a Mormon Historian: Leonard J. Arrington on the New Mormon History, Norman, Oklahoma: Arthur H. Clark, ISBN 0-87062-348-6.
- Walker, Ronald W.; Turley, Richard E. Jr.; Leonard, Glen M. (2008), Massacre at Mountain Meadows, Oxford; New York: Oxford University Press, ISBN 978-0-19-516034-5.
- Turley, Richard E. Jr.; Walker, Ronald W., eds. (2009), Mountain Meadows Massacre: The Andrew Jenson and David H. Morris Collections, Provo, Utah: BYU Press, ISBN 978-0-8425-2723-1.
