= Richard D. Poll =

American Mormon historian

Richard Douglas Poll (April 23, 1918 – April 27, 1994) was an American historian, academic, author and member of the Church of Jesus Christ of Latter-day Saints (LDS Church). His liberal religiosity influenced his notable metaphor about "Iron Rod" vs. "Liahona" LDS Church members.

== Biography ==
Poll was born in Salt Lake City, where he lived until moving to Fort Worth, Texas at age 10. He published his first article at age 13 in Liahona, the Elders' Journal, a missionary magazine published by the LDS Church. From 1939 to 1941 he served as an LDS missionary, first in Germany until World War II began, and then in Canada. From 1942 to 1945, Poll served as a first lieutenant in the U.S. Army Air Force without seeing the front. He married Emogene (Gene) Hill in 1943 in the Salt Lake Temple, and they remained married until their deaths in 1994 in Provo, Utah.

Throughout his life, Poll was active in the LDS Church and served in various positions, such as stake high councilor.

=== Academics ===
In Fort Worth, Poll studied at Texas Christian University (TCU), completing a bachelor's degree in history in 1938. He also received a master's degree from TCU in 1939, writing his thesis on the U.S. campaign against Mormon polygamy. Poll later received a Ph.D. in history from the University of California, Berkeley in 1948.

From 1948 to 1970 Poll was a history professor at Brigham Young University (BYU). In 1955, he became chair of the department of history. He was the charter president of the American Association of University Professors (AAUP) at BYU in 1959. In 1962, Poll became associate director of the BYU Honors Program, and was named Honors Professor of the Year at BYU in 1969. From 1958 to 1965, he had also occasionally taught at the University of Maryland, College Park, European Division. At BYU, Poll clashed with BYU administration and some church leadership over his AAUP involvement, their anti-communism, and the role of organic evolution. After uncertainty over whether his BYU contract would be renewed, Poll resigned to take a position as vice president of Western Illinois University (WIU) in 1969. He remained in that role until 1975, though he continued teaching history at WIU until 1983. In his retirement, Poll taught occasional classes at BYU from 1983 until his death in 1994.

From 1978 to 1993, Poll and his wife taught reading and writing skills in adult education classes offered by the LDS Church.

== "Iron Rod" and "Liahona" metaphor ==
Poll wrote on various topics in Latter-day Saint history and thought. His religious approach was influenced by his studies at TCU, where he examined and rejected creationism, scriptural literalism, and prophetic infallibility. He remembered one professor saying "the purpose of religion is to comfort the afflicted and afflict the comfortable." In 1963, Poll prepared a paper called "What the Church Means to People Like Me", which he delivered in the Palo Alto Ward sacrament meeting in August 1967 and published in Dialogue: A Journal of Mormon Thought.

The paper drew upon Book of Mormon imagery. In Lehi and Nephi's vision, people held onto an "iron rod" that followed a single path to salvation. In another story, a mysterious instrument, called the "Liahona", pointed righteous travelers toward their destination. Poll's paper set up a dichotomy between church members who see the gospel as clear and exact, or "hold to the Iron Rod", and those who follow the guidance of the church as a compass to lead their lives. He explained:

The Iron Rod Saint does not look for questions but for answers, and in the gospel he finds or is confident that he can find the answer to every important question. The Liahona Saint, on the other hand, is preoccupied with questions and skeptical of answers; he finds in the gospel answers to enough important questions so that he can function purposefully without answers to the rest.

The subject caught the attention of LDS intellectuals and leaders, becoming a poignant metaphor in cultural discourse. It would become Poll's best known article, and was republished several other times.

In a 1971 General Conference address, church apostle Harold B. Lee alluded to and denounced Poll's ideas, saying:

If there is any one thing most needed in this time of tumult and frustration, ... it is an "iron rod" as a safe guide along the straight path on the way to eternal life, ... There are many who profess to be religious and speak of themselves as Christians, and, according to one such, "as accepting the scriptures only as sources of inspiration and moral truth," and then ask in their smugness: "Do the revelations of God give us a handrail to the kingdom of God, as the Lord's messenger told Lehi, or merely a compass?"... Wouldn't it be a great thing if all who are well schooled in secular learning could hold fast to the "iron rod," or the word of God, ... ?

Lee also quoted the phrase, "A liberal in the Church is merely one who does not have a testimony." Lee then quoted John A. Widtsoe's definition of "a liberal in the church" as one who has broken with the fundamental principles, does not believe in its basic concepts, and sets out to reform it by changing its foundations. Lee's reference broke with the context of Widtsoe's talk, however, which was not a rhetorical attack on liberals, but rather the misuse of the term liberal to mean those who reject religious faith due to a perceived unwillingness within the religious community to embrace change and progress. In the Widtsoe talk, which Lee had quoted out of context, Widtsoe had said:

The word liberal, correctly used, has a noble meaning. The true liberal… is tolerant, free from bigotry, and generous in all his deeds. He places truth above all else and hungers for full truth. He welcomes all new improvements and calls for more… He insists that every new invention must be used for human welfare, with full respect to civil and moral law. In short, the liberal seeks to make better the day in which he lives, and he becomes therefore a crusader for the betterment of the human race… His liberalism lies in his constant attempt to make the underlying unchanging principles of the cause he represents serve the changing conditions of the day. He may differ with the superficial conventions of the past, but not with its established truths. He may refuse to continue the church architecture of the past, but will insist that the ancient truths of the Gospel be taught... forever seeking, under changing conditions, to make the doctrine of human brotherhood more effective in behalf of the needy... the Church of Jesus Christ of Latter-day Saints is pre-eminently liberal… It declares that men "live and move and have their being" under the law of progress. Change steps upon the heels of change in the unfolding of a progressive universe. The simple eternal truths of existence are combined and combined again, in different ways, but progressively, to serve man on his never-ending journey… Members of the Church of Jesus Christ of Latter-day Saints do not need to look elsewhere for a liberal Church.

Poll and his wife considered themselves "Liahona" Mormons.

== Honors ==
- 1939 Wilber Kidd Fellowship at Texas Christian University
- 1948 Willard D. Thompson Fellowship at University of California, Berkeley
- 1969 BYU Honors Professor of the Year
- 1970 President of the Mormon History Association.
- 1979 Presidential Merit Award for quality and accuracy in historical work
- 1985 Secretary/Treasurer of the BYU Academy Foundation
- 1994 Personal Essay award from the Association for Mormon Letters for "A Liahona Latter-day Saint"

== Writings ==
=== Books ===
- Campbell, Eugene E.; Richard D. Poll (1975). Hugh B. Brown, His Life and Thought. Salt Lake City: Bookcraft. ISBN 0-88494-293-7.
- Poll, Richard D.; Miller, David E.; Campbell, Eugene E.; Alexander, Thomas G., eds. (1978). Utah's History. Provo, Utah: Brigham Young University Press. ISBN 0-8425-0842-2.
- —— (1980). Howard J. Stoddard, Founder, Michigan National Bank. East Lansing: Michigan State University Press. ISBN 0-87013-220-2.
- —— (1983). Henry D. Moyle, Man of Action. Unpublished manuscript in the BYU Harold B. Lee Library. s.n.
- —— (1985). The Honors Program at Brigham Young University, 1960-1985. Provo, Utah: Brigham Young University Honors Program.
- —— (1989). History and Faith: Reflections of a Mormon Historian. Salt Lake City: Signature Books. ISBN 0-941214-75-3.
- ——; Miller, David E.; Campbell, Eugene E.; Alexander, Thomas G., eds. (1989). Utah's History. Logan: Utah State University Press. ISBN 0-87421-142-5.
- —— (1999). Stan Larson (ed.). Working the Divine Miracle: The Life of Apostle Henry D. Moyle. Salt Lake City: Signature Books. ISBN 1-56085-129-5.

=== Articles ===
- Poll, Richard D. (April 1957). "The Mormon Question Enters National Politics, 1850-1856". Utah Historical Quarterly. 25 (2): 117–31. doi:10.2307/45057893. JSTOR 45057893. S2CID 254441793.
- —— (May 1958). "The Political Reconstruction of Utah Territory, 1866-1890". Pacific Historical Review. 27 (2): 111–26. doi:10.2307/3636068. JSTOR 3636068.
- ——; Hansen, Ralph W. (Fall 1961). "Buchanan's Blunder: The Utah War, 1857-1858". Military Affairs. 25 (3): 121–31. doi:10.2307/1983459. JSTOR 1983459.
- —— (1963). A Short History of Communism in Russia. Provo, Utah: Brigham Young University, Adult Education and Extension Services.
- —— (Winter 1964). "A State is Born". Utah Historical Quarterly. 32 (1): 9–31. doi:10.2307/45058388. JSTOR 45058388. S2CID 254429148.
- —— (Winter 1967). "What the Church Means to People Like Me". Dialogue: A Journal of Mormon Thought. 2 (4): 107–17. doi:10.2307/45223949. JSTOR 45223949.
- —— (Autumn 1968). "Joseph Smith and the Presidency, 1844". Dialogue: A Journal of Mormon Thought. 3 (3): 17–21. doi:10.2307/45224011. JSTOR 45224011. S2CID 254398463.
- —— (Spring 1972). "God and Man in History". Dialogue: A Journal of Mormon Thought. 7 (1): 101–109. doi:10.2307/45224277. JSTOR 45224277. S2CID 254398180.
- —— (1975–1976). "Apostle Extraordinary—Hugh B. Brown (1883-1975)". Dialogue: A Journal of Mormon Thought. 10 (1): 68–71. doi:10.2307/45224555. JSTOR 45224555. S2CID 254393806.
- —— (Winter 1976). "The Americanism of Utah". Utah Historical Quarterly. 44 (1): 76–93. doi:10.2307/45059676. JSTOR 45059676. S2CID 254439338.
- —— (1978). "Nauvoo and the New Mormon History: A Bibliographical Survey". Journal of Mormon History. 5: 105–23.
- —— (Summer 1983). "Liahona and Iron Rod Revisited". Dialogue: A Journal of Mormon Thought. 16 (2): 67–78. doi:10.2307/45228236. JSTOR 45228236. S2CID 254391037.
- —— (Fall 1986). "The Legislative Antipolygamy Campaign". BYU Studies. 26 (4): 107–21.
- —— (December 1985). "The Swearing Elders: Some Reflections" (PDF). Sunstone. 10 (9): 14–17.
- —— (1987). "Utah and the Mormons: A Symbiotic Relationship". In Davis Bitton, Maureen Ursenbach Beecher (ed.). New Views of Mormon History. Salt Lake City: University of Utah Press. pp. 323–41. ISBN 0-87480-304-7.
- —— (May 1988). "Dealing with Dissonance: Myths, Documents, and Faith" (PDF). Sunstone. 12 (3): 17–21.
- —— (1989). "The British Mission During the Utah War, 1857-58". In Richard L. Jensen, Malcolm R. Thorp (ed.). Mormons in Early Victorian Britain. Publications in Mormon Studies. Vol. 4. Salt Lake City: University of Utah Press. pp. 224–42. ISBN 0-87480-322-5.
- —— (Fall 1989). "The Move South". BYU Studies. 29 (4): 65–88.
- —— (September 1991). "Truth, Facts, and Personal Anecdotes" (PDF). Sunstone. 15 (3): 54–55.
- —— (1992). "Utah Expedition". In Daniel H. Ludlow (ed.). Encyclopedia of Mormonism. Vol. 4. New York: Macmillan. pp. 1500–02.
- —— (Spring 1993). "Thomas L. Kane and the Utah War". Utah Historical Quarterly. 61 (2): 112–35. doi:10.2307/45062098. JSTOR 45062098. S2CID 254438793.
- —— (Spring 1993). "Dialogue Toward Forgiveness". Dialogue: A Journal of Mormon Thought. 26 (1): 67–75. doi:10.2307/45228622. JSTOR 45228622. S2CID 254343652.
- —— (September 1994). "A Liahona Latter-day Saint" (PDF). Sunstone. 17 (2): 35–38.
- ——; MacKinnon, William P. (Fall 1994). "Causes of the Utah War Reconsidered". Journal of Mormon History. 20 (2): 16–44. Archived from the original on May 15, 2012.

=== Other ===
- Poll, Richard D. (1939). The Twin Relic: A Study of Mormon Polygamy and the Campaign by the Government of the United States for Its Abolition, 1852-1890. Master's thesis. Fort Worth: Texas Christian University.
- —— (September 1948). The Mormon Question, 1850-1856: A Study in Politics and Public Opinion. Doctoral dissertation. University of California, Berkeley.
- —— (June 15–19, 1953). The Constitution of the United States. Leadership Week address (Relief Society Institute series). Provo, Utah: Brigham Young University.
- —— (1962). This Trumpet Gives an Uncertain Sound: A Review of W. Cleon Skousen's The Naked Communist. Provo, Utah: Richard D. Poll.
- ——, ed. (1962). Education for Freedom and World Understanding; A Report of the Working Committees. Conference on the Ideals of American Freedom and the International Dimensions of Education. Washington, D.C.: U.S. Department of Health, Education, and Welfare, Office of Education. OCLC 193788.
- Rich, Owen S.; ——; Tess M. Williams (1966). Final Report of a Study of the Utilization of Large-Screen TV to Overcome Shortages of Classroom Space and Teaching Personnel. Provo, Utah: Brigham Young University.
- Poll, Richard D. (April 23, 1980). Utah and the Mormons: A Symbiotic Relationship. The second David E. Miller Lecture on Utah and the West. Salt Lake City: University of Utah.
- —— (1985). Quixotic Mediator: Thomas L. Kane and the Utah War. Dello G. Dayton Memorial Lecture. Ogden, Utah: Weber State College Press.
