= Peggy Fletcher Stack =

American journalist, editor, and author

- Born: Peggy Fletcher; New Jersey
- Education: University of Utah (BA); Graduate Theological Union (MA)
- Occupations: Journalist; Editor; Writer
- Years active: 1975-current
- Known for: Sunstone Magazine; SL Tribune Faith editor
- Spouse(s): Michael "Mike" Stack married 1 October 1985
- Awards: Pulitzer Prize (2017); Cornell Award (2004, 2012, 2017-2018)

Peggy Fletcher Stack is an American journalist, editor, and author. Stack has been the lead religion writer for The Salt Lake Tribune since 1991. She and several other journalists at the Salt Lake Tribune won the 2017 Pulitzer Prize for Local Reporting.

In 1975 Stack helped found Sunstone, an independent magazine of Mormon studies, and steered it for its first eleven years. She was the editor of Hastings Center Report from 1986 until 1991, when she was hired to start the "Faith" column in the Salt Lake Tribune. She won the Cornell Award for Excellence in Religion Reporting—Mid-sized Newspapers from the Religious News Association in 2004, 2012, 2017, 2018, and 2022. Stack is an advisor on religion to the Public Broadcasting Service, and has written two books.

== Biography ==
Peggy Fletcher was raised in New Jersey, daughter of physicist Robert Chipman Fletcher and Rosemary Bennett, one of five girls and three boys. She was raised as a member of the Church of Jesus Christ of Latter-day Saints (LDS Church), with her father traveling and speaking as a member of the stake high council. She is a great-granddaughter of Heber J. Grant, an LDS Church president, a granddaughter of United States Senator from Utah, Wallace F. Bennett, and a granddaughter of American physicist Harvey Fletcher.

Fletcher initially attended Brigham Young University (BYU) in Provo, Utah, for a year, then transferred to the University of Utah, where she earned a BA in English literature. She then attended the Graduate Theological Union in Berkeley, California for two years, where she studied religious history. She then received a fellowship to work in the Church History Division of the LDS Church (then run by Leonard J. Arrington).

In 1975, following discussions with Scott Kenney and others, she helped found Sunstone, an independent magazine of Mormon studies. From 1978 to 1986, she was the third editor of Sunstone. During her time with the magazine, she helped turn around its finances, saving it from closing. She met Mike Stack when he volunteered as a photographer for Sunstone in 1984, and they married in October 1985.

The Stacks traveled in Africa for a year, then settled in New York City for five years, where she worked as the editor of the Hastings Center Report while her husband attended film school. They moved to Utah in 1991 when she was hired to be the religion writer for The Salt Lake Tribune, where much of her reporting has focused on the LDS Church. She started the "Faith" column after a discussion with Tribune editor Jay Shelledy. During her time there, she has met and interviewed the Dalai Lama, Desmond Tutu, and Gordon B. Hinckley, among others.

Stack wrote a children's book about religion with artist Kathleen B. Petersen, entitled A World of Faith, published in 1998. The book "explains similarities in moral teachings and the unique forms of worship of most American denominations."

She won the 2004 Cornell Award for 'Excellence in Religion Reporting—Mid-sized Newspapers' from the Religion Newswriters Association in 2004, an award she also received in 2012, 2017, and 2018. The American Academy of Religion awarded her a first place Journalism Award in 2014 for her reporting on LDS missionaries who return home early from their volunteer missions.

In 2017, Stack, along with several other staffers, won a Pulitzer Prize in the Local Reporting category for a series of stories, described as "a string of vivid reports revealing the perverse, punitive and cruel treatment given to sexual assault victims at Brigham Young University, one of Utah’s most powerful institutions." Stack's work in the series included the article "‘Rape culture’: Outdated Mormon teachings that placed much of the blame on women are tough to quash even if the church officially has changed its attitude." This was The Salt Lake Tribune's second Pulitzer Prize, and its first Pulitzer in 60 years.

== Publications ==
Books

- Stack, Peggy Fletcher (1998). A World of Faith. Peterson, Kathleen B. (illustrator). Salt Lake City, Utah: Signature Books. ISBN 978-1-56085-116-5. OCLC 40150590.
- Daniel Burke; Peggy Fletcher Stack; Matt Canham; Jana Reiss (18 October 2012). The Mormon Moment: A Religion News Service Guide. Patheos Press.

Journal articles

- Fletcher, Peggy (June 1976). "About the Sunstone" (PDF). Sunstone: 10–13. ISSN 0363-1370. OCLC 367574561.
- Fletcher, Peggy (June 1978). "Speaking Tubes in the Household of Faith" (PDF). Sunstone: 8–12.
- Fletcher, Peggy (August 1982). "A Light Unto the World: Image Building Is Anathema to Christian Living" (PDF). Sunstone: 16–23.
- Fletcher, Peggy (January 1985). "From the Editors: Stretching Toward the Light" (PDF). Sunstone: 4–5.
- Fletcher, Peggy (January 1985). "Poelman Revises Conference Speech" (PDF). Sunstone: 44–45.
- Fletcher, Peggy (February 1985). "From the Editors: People of God" (PDF). Sunstone: 4–5.
- Fletcher, Peggy (April 1985). "From the Editors: A Failure to Communicate" (PDF). Sunstone: 6–7.
- Fletcher, Peggy (April 1985). "Church Historian: Evolution of a Calling" (PDF). Sunstone: 46–48.
- Fletcher, Peggy (May 1985). "From the Editors: Decennial Reflection" (PDF). Sunstone: 2–3.
- Ruthven, Malise; Fletcher Stack, Peggy (Spring 1991). "The Mormons' Progress". The Wilson Quarterly. 15 (2): 22–47. ISSN 0363-3276. OCLC 609064233. Archived from the original (fee required) on 18 July 2011.
- Stack, Peggy Fletcher (April 1995). "Tales of a true believer: picking up faith along the way" (PDF). Sunstone: 48–54.
- Stack, Peggy Fletcher (December 1998). "Books: Mormon Novels Entertain While Teaching Lessons" (PDF). Sunstone: 66–67.
- Fletcher, Peggy (December 1999). "Decennial Reflections" (PDF). Sunstone. 22 (Silver Anniversary): 113–115.
- Stack, Peggy Fletcher (March 2005). "Twenty Years Ago in Sunstone: Symbol and Promise" (PDF). Sunstone: 13.

== Awards and honors ==
Stack has received and been nominated for multiple awards.

Year	Organization	Award title, Category	Work	Result	Notes	Refs
2004	Religion Newswriters Association	RNA Awards, Cornell Award for Excellence in Religion Reporting—Mid-sized Newspapers	-	Won	-	
2008	Religion Newswriters Association	RNA Awards, Cornell Award for Excellence in Religion Reporting—Mid-sized Newspapers	"They've got a friend" "Saved by a stranger" "Latter Day: Nod to anarchy" "A Bonanza of His Own" "Grasping Mitt"	3	-	
2010	Religion Newswriters Association	RNA Awards, Cornell Award for Excellence in Religion Reporting—Mid-sized Newspapers	-	2	-	
2011	Religion Newswriters Association	RNA Awards, Cornell Award for Excellence in Religion Reporting—Mid-sized Newspapers	"Nation's Founders: How Religious Were They?" "The Line Between Inspiration and Insanity" "Mormon Feminism: It's Back"	2	-	
2011	Religion Newswriters Association	RNA Awards, Supple Religion Writer of the Year	"Nation's Founders: How Religious Were They?" "Christ's Evil Twin? The Vampire's Religious Roots" "The Line Between Inspiration and Insanity"	3	-	
2012	Religion Newswriters Association	RNA Awards, Cornell Award for Excellence in Religion Reporting—Mid-sized Newspapers	-	Won	-	
2013	Religion Newswriters Association	RNA Awards, Cornell Award for Excellence in Religion Reporting—Mid-sized Newspapers	-	2	-	
2013	Religion Newswriters Association	RNA Awards, Supple Religion Writer of the Year	-	3	-	
2014	American Academy of Religion	Journalism Award	"Guilt, pain, help and hope — when Mormon missionaries come home early"	Won	-	
2015	Religion Newswriters Association	RNA Awards, Cornell Award for Excellence in Religion Reporting—Mid-sized Newspapers	-	2	-	
2016	Religion Newswriters Association	RNA Awards, Cornell Award for Excellence in Religion Reporting—Mid-sized Newspapers	-	3	-	
2017	Columbia University	Pulitzer Prize, Local Reporting	"For a string of vivid reports revealing the perverse, punitive and cruel treatment given to sexual assault victims at Brigham Young University, one of Utah's most powerful institutions."	Won	Shared by six writers.	
2017	Religion Newswriters Association	RNA Awards, Cornell Award for Excellence in Religion Reporting—Mid-sized Newspapers	-	Won	-	
2018	Religion Newswriters Association	RNA Awards, Cornell Award for Excellence in Religion Reporting—Mid-sized Newspapers	-	Won	-	
2022	Religion Newswriters Association	RNA Awards, Cornell Award for Excellence in Religion Reporting—Mid-sized Newspapers	-	Won	-	
