= Arthur H. Clark =

Australian sculptor

Arthur H. Clark (30 May 1924 – 21 March 2017) was an Australian sculptor from Bundaberg, Queensland.

== Biography ==
Clark was born in Blandford Forum, Dorset, in the United Kingdom, and migrated to Australia with his family in 1963. Since his retirement in 1983, Clark turned his long interest in woodcraft into an art career, and turned his hand to wood sculpting. His work has appeared in exhibitions in Cologne, Germany, and across Australia.

== Awards and exhibitions ==
- 1988 World Expo, Brisbane
- 1989 Adrian Slinger Gallery, Brisbane 1989
