= Arthur Melville Clark =

Scottish educationalist (1895–1990)

Arthur Melville Clark FRSE (20 August 1895 – 21 March 1990) was a Scottish educationalist and author of several academic books about English literature and poetry.

== Life ==
He was born in Edinburgh on 20 August 1895 the son of Margaret Moyes (née McLachlan) and James Clark. He was schooled at Daniel Stewart’s College. He studied at both the University of Oxford and the University of Edinburgh. On graduation in 1920 he began lecturing in English language and literature at the University of Reading. From 1928 to 1946 he was a Reader in English Literature at the University of Edinburgh.

He was elected a Fellow of the Royal Society of Edinburgh in 1928, his proposers including Francis Albert Eley Crew. In 1947 the University of Edinburgh awarded him an honorary doctorate (DLitt).

He died in Edinburgh on 21 March 1990.

== Other positions ==
- President of the Speculative Society 1926 to 1929
- President of the Edinburgh branch of the Scott Club 1957-58

== War service ==
Clark was awarded the Knights Cross of the Order of Polonia Restituta in the Second World War. He was also made a Knight of the Order of St Lazarus of Jerusalem. These awards related to his work on international relations during the war.

== Publications ==
- The Realistic Revolt in Modern Poetry (1922)
- A Bibliography of Thomas Heywood (1924)
- Thomas Heywood: Playwright and Miscellanist (1931)
- Autobiography: Its Genesis and Phases (1935)
- Spoken English (1946)
- Studies in Literary Modes (1946)
- Sir Walter Scott: The Formative Years (1969)
- Murder Under Trust, or, The Topical MacBeth and Other Jacobean Matters (1982)
