= Glen M. Leonard =

American historian

Glen Milton Leonard (born 1938) is an American historian specializing in Mormon history.

== Background ==
Leonard is a native of Farmington, Utah. He received his Ph.D. in history from the University of Utah. For a time he was managing editor of Utah Historical Quarterly. He has taught at both Brigham Young University and Utah State University. Leonard has been the director of the Museum of Church History and Art in Salt Lake City since it opened in 1984.

Leonard and his wife Karen had three sons. They live in Farmington, Utah.

Among other callings in the LDS Church, Leonard has served as seventies quorum president, bishop and counselor in a stake presidency. He later served as president of the Farmington Utah North Stake.

== Published work ==
Leonard has authored and co-authored several books on Mormon history. Among these are Nauvoo: A Place of Peace, A People of Promise and A History of Davis County, Utah. He also co-authored The Story of the Latter-day Saints with James B. Allen and Massacre at Mountain Meadows with Richard E. Turley, Jr. and Ronald W. Walker.

== See also ==
- Latter Day Saint historians
