= Richard E. Bennett =

Canadian Mormon leader

Richard Edmond Bennett (born 1946) is a professor of church history and doctrine at Brigham Young University (BYU). Prior to joining the faculty of BYU, Bennett was the head of the Department of Archives and Special Collections at the University of Manitoba from 1978 to 1997. Bennett has served as president of the Mormon History Association.

Bennett is a native of Sudbury, Ontario, Canada. He served a mission for the Church of Jesus Christ of Latter-day Saints (LDS Church) in Texas from 1967 to 1969. He has a master's degree from BYU where he wrote his thesis on early-nineteenth-century missionary activities of the LDS Church in Ontario. Bennett has a PhD in United States intellectual history from Wayne State University. He is currently the church history editor for BYU Studies and was previously associate editor of the Journal of Book of Mormon Studies.

Bennett is the author of The Nauvoo Legion in Illinois: A History of the Mormon Militia, 1841–1846, We'll Find the Place: The Mormon Exodus, 1846-1848, and Mormons at the Missouri: 1846-1852.

Bennett has served as president of the Winnipeg Manitoba Stake and in 2020, he and his wife, Patricia Dyer, were called as directors of the church's historic site at Winter Quarters, Nebraska.

They are the parents of five children.

== Selected Speeches ==
- "Martin Harris and the Three Wise Men" – November 29, 2005

== Sources ==
- BYU faculty bio
- University of Manitoba bio
