= Fred R. Gowans =

American academic

Fred Gowans
- Born: Frederick Ross Gowans; 1936 (age 89–90)

Academic work
- Discipline: History
- Sub-discipline: History of the Fur trade
- Institutions: Brigham Young University

Frederick Ross Gowans (born 1936) was an American historian working as a Professor Emeritus at Brigham Young University (BYU) in Provo, Utah.

== Career ==
Gowans specializes in the fur trade in the Western United States. He has written several books on subjects such as Fort Bridger and the Rocky Mountain Rendezvous. He has authored manuscripts and articles researching the fur trade, mountain men, and the rendezvous system for over forty years, making him the pre-eminent expert on fur trade history.

Gowans has presented special programs and historical treks to numerous universities, educational institutions, and the National Park Service. He also served as a consultant on numerous films and documentaries about the history of the West and has been accorded several prestigious awards in film and academia. From 1973 to 2001, Gowans was the Native American studies coordinator at BYU. He was also involved in compiling BYU's overland trails database.
