= Sunstone (magazine) =

Magazine discussing the LDS church and culture

- Sunstone Issue 127, May 2003
- Director of Publications and Editor: Stephen R. Carter
- Categories: Mormon studies: scholarship, issues, literature, and art
- Frequency: about four times per year
- First issue: Winter 1975
- Company: Sunstone Education Foundation
- Country: United States
- Based in: Salt Lake City, Utah
- Website: Sunstone
- ISSN: 0363-1370

Sunstone is a magazine published by the Sunstone Education Foundation, Inc., a 501(c)(3) nonprofit corporation, that discusses Mormonism through scholarship, art, short fiction, and poetry. The foundation began the publication in 1974. The magazine's motto is Faith Seeking Understanding.

== History ==
In the 1960s–1970s, independent Mormon studies associations and publications were emerging, including the Mormon History Association and Dialogue: A Journal of Mormon Thought. The Journal of Mormon History and Exponent II were both launched in 1974, and in that same year two graduate students at divinity schools, Scott Kenney and Keith Norman, hatched plans to create a scholarly journal for Mormon students. Gathering student volunteers but lacking funding, the team produced and sold a Mormon history calendar in Utah and California. They were encouraged by the Dialogue staff, including editor Robert Rees, who suggested the name "Sunstone", an architectural symbol from the Mormon temple in Nauvoo. After struggles and delays, the first issue was printed in November 1975.

The publication faced early challenges. The time and effort to produce each issue was demanding on the volunteer staff, and the first several issues had a different editor for each issue, under the leadership of Kenney and Peggy Fletcher. For Orson Scott Card's ghost-edited issue in Summer 1977, Card had convinced the board to change to a cheaper and more accessible magazine format. Facing financial troubles later that year, Sunstone merged with the New Messenger and Advocate, a new LDS news magazine with plenty of advertising, which further influenced the Sunstone format. In 1978 Kenney returned to edit three more issues before retiring from the venture, and passing the editorship to Fletcher and Allen D. Roberts who would also go on to start its symposia. The magazine kept its approach for a popular audience while emphasizing intellectual issues, but it eventually dropped its student emphasis.

=== Symposia ===
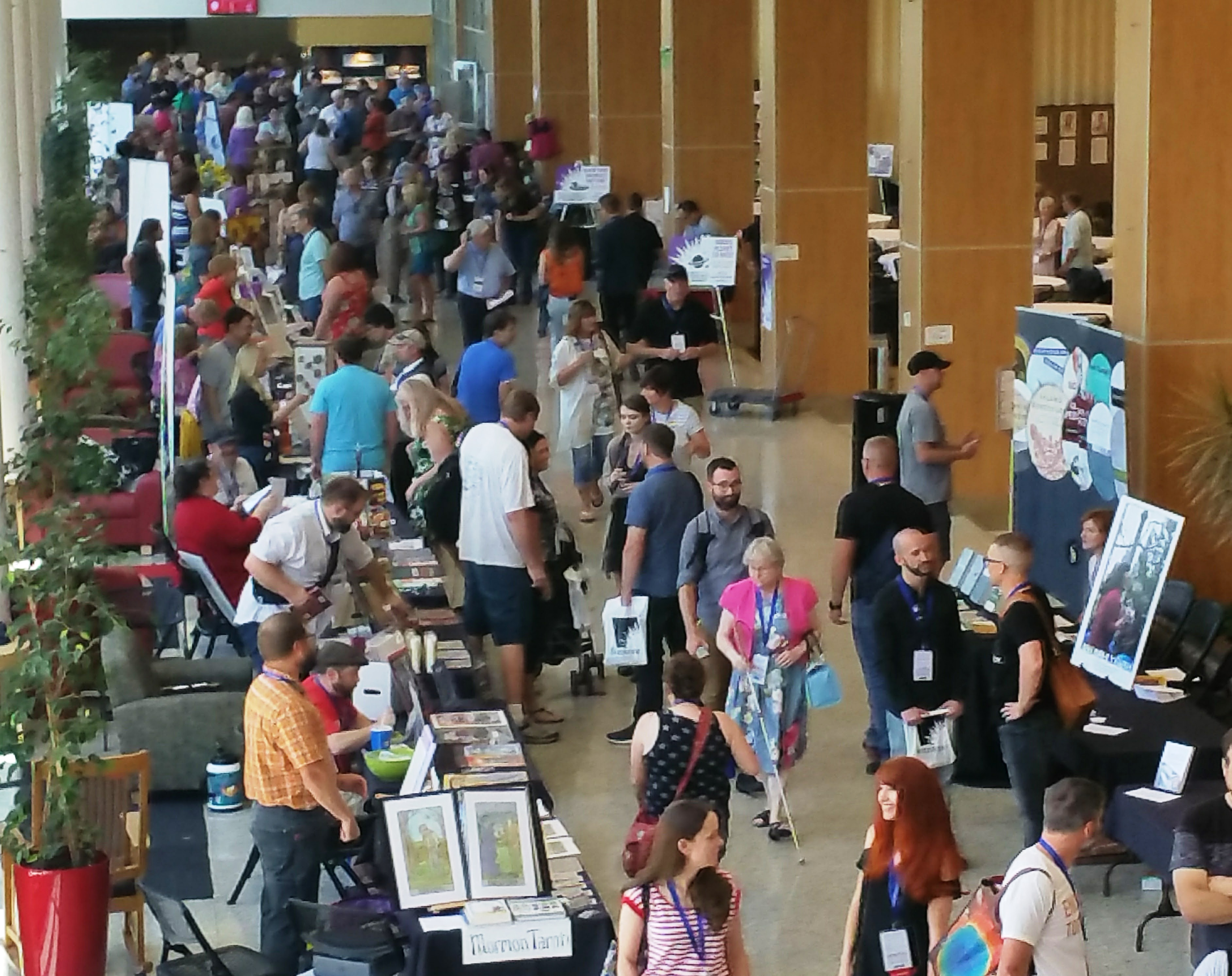
Attendees visiting booths between presentations at the 2017 Sunstone Symposium on the University of Utah campus

In 1979, Sunstone began sponsoring an annual symposium in Salt Lake City, which is now a four-day event with approximately 100 different sessions generally held the second week of August. Since the 1980s, Sunstone has also regularly held regional symposia in Washington, D.C., California, Seattle, Chicago, Dallas, and Boston.

While early magazine issues and symposia included heavy participation from a full range of perspectives, circumstances and events in the late 1980s and early 1990s damaged Sunstone's reputation and hurt subscribership. These events included a 1989 address given by Dallin H. Oaks, an apostle of the LDS Church, warning of "Alternate Voices" and a November 1991 "Statement on Symposia" issued by the church's First Presidency, although Sunstone was never mentioned in either case. Because of Sunstone's position as a visible symbol of independent thought within Mormonism, however, these communications led to a decline in participation in Sunstone fora by many conservative and moderate voices. This trend culminated after six individuals were disciplined by the LDS Church in September 1993, after which the potential costs of writing for the magazine and speaking at its symposia were feared by some to be too high. With a lack of participation from moderate and conservative voices, Sunstone experienced an unbalancing of many presentations toward liberal causes and points of view.

The Smith-Pettit Foundation sponsors an annual lecture in conjunction with Sunstone magazine.

== Publication ==
The magazine is published about four times per year, and in addition to the annual Salt Lake symposium, the foundation generally sponsors three to five smaller-scale, regional symposia each year.

In 2018, Sunstone announced that it would no longer produce magazine issues throughout the year, due to the high costs of print publishing. Instead, subscribers would receive articles as podcasts and electronic documents, with a print digest of all new articles to be published annually. Podcast episodes would be published throughout the year and each contain at least two articles, and would be distributed through Patreon subscriptions.

== Editors and publishers ==
Editor	Publisher
Scott G. Kenney, 1975–1978 (During this time, rotating issue-editors included Kenney, Peggy Fletcher, Kris Cassity, Norman Mecham, Elizabeth Shaw, Orson Scott Card, and Kevin Barnhurst.)
Allen D. Roberts and Peggy Fletcher, 1978–1980
Peggy Fletcher, 1978–1986
Elbert Eugene Peck, 1986–2001	Daniel Rector, 1986–1991
Elbert Eugene Peck, 1986–2001	Linda Jean Stephenson, 1991–1992
Elbert Eugene Peck, 1986–2001	William B. Stanford, 2000–2008
Dan Wotherspoon, 2001–2008	William B. Stanford, 2000–2008
Stephen R. Carter, 2008–present

== See also ==
- Dialogue: A Journal of Mormon Thought
- Mormon History Association
- List of Latter Day Saint periodicals

== Sources ==
- Kenney, Scott (June 1999), "Sunstone: Past and Present" (PDF), Sunstone (114): 54–55
- Warthen, Lee (June 1999), "History of Sunstone, Chapter 1: The Scott Kenney Years: Summer 1974 - June 1978" (PDF), Sunstone (114): 48–61
