= Mormon feminism =

Feminist religious social movement

Mormon feminism is a feminist religious social movement concerned with the role of women within Mormonism. Mormon feminists commonly advocate for a more significant recognition of Heavenly Mother, the ordination of women, gender equality, and social justice grounded in Mormon theology and history. Mormon feminism advocates for more representation and presence of women as well as more leadership roles for women within the hierarchical structure of the church. It also promotes fostering healthy cultural attitudes concerning women and girls.

The modern form of the movement has roots that go back to the founding of Mormonism, including the largely independent operation of the female Relief Society, blessings by women in early church history, and the women's suffrage movement in the western United States.

== History ==
=== First wave ===
The first wave of Mormon feminism embraced many of the ideas of liberal feminism that were a product of the Enlightenment, i.e., "the authority of individual reason, equality of the sexes, [and] rational/legal concerns such as the right to vote." In the early history of the Church of Jesus Christ of Latter-day Saints (LDS Church), early feminist assertions surfaced in the 1840s with the founding of the Female Relief Society of Nauvoo, Illinois, with Emma Hale Smith as its first president. Eliza R. Snow promoted the idea of a Heavenly Mother and equal status for women. Women were first included in Mormon prayer circles on September 28, 1843. The Woman's Exponent was a periodical published from 1872 until 1914 in Salt Lake City whose purpose was to uplift and strengthen women of the LDS Church and to educate those not of the Mormon faith about the women of Mormonism. With some help from the Relief Society, the Utah Territory was at the forefront of women's suffrage; in 1870, it became one of the first states or territories in the Union to grant women the vote, though the federal government removed the franchise from women in 1887 via the Edmunds–Tucker Act. The sociologist Laura Vance has noted that Relief Society publications in the early twentieth century promoted ideas and ideals that were consistent with contemporary feminism.

=== Second wave ===
Esther Peterson, a Mormon woman who was the director of the United States Women's Bureau, proposed the idea of the Presidential Commission on the Status of Women in 1960, later signed into law in 1961.

After the consolidation of the Relief Society Magazine into the Ensign in 1970, an independent publication calling itself Exponent II was started in 1974 by several Cambridge, Massachusetts–area women, including Claudia Bushman, Laurel Thatcher Ulrich, Judy Dushku and Susan Paxman (later Booth-Forbes). The magazine focused on the experiences of Mormon women from a feminist perspective. However, in the 1970s, the LDS Church came out against the Equal Rights Amendment. The LDS Church in Utah requested that ten women from each ward attend the Utah International Women's Year in 1977 to support the church's position on the Equal Rights Amendment and other women's issues. The fourteen thousand attendees, mostly Mormon women recruited in their wards, voted on platforms before hearing their discussion and rejected all the national resolutions—even those that did not advocate a moral position opposed to that of the LDS Church. In 1978, the LDS church encouraged nine thousand female members in greater Las Vegas, Nevada, to canvass their neighborhoods with anti–Equal Rights Amendment pamphlets and encouraged all members to vote. Nevada did not ratify the amendment. Sonia Johnson fought against the church in support of the Equal Rights Amendment and was excommunicated; a December 1979 excommunication letter claimed that Johnson was charged with a variety of misdeeds, including hindering the worldwide missionary program, damaging internal Mormon social programs, and teaching false doctrine. Also in 1979, the Alice Reynolds forum was forbidden from discussing the amendment in the Alice Reynolds reading room at Brigham Young University; the club subsequently found a different place to meet.

In 1993, Maxine Hanks, Lynne Kanavel Whitesides, and Lavina Fielding Anderson spoke out for women's rights and were excommunicated from the LDS Church as a part of the "September Six". Two other prominent feminist writers, Janice Merrill Allred and her sister Margaret Toscano, were also involved in courts at the time, but not excommunicated until 1995 and 2000 respectively. To some, it seemed like Mormon feminism went underground or disappeared during the 1990s after September 1993. However, Mormon feminists were starting to use other means of communication, like listservs, to continue dialogue without the threat of ecclesiastical discipline.

=== Third wave ===
Joanna Brooks left the church in the aftermath of the September Six, but later came back and spoke out for women's rights within the LDS Church. The Feminist Mormon Housewives group blog was started during the 2004 US presidential election by Lisa Butterworth and four of her friends as a place to discuss liberal, feminist views. Caroline Kline, Jana Remy, Emily Clyde Curtis, and Deborah Farmer Kris founded The Exponent blog, an offshoot of the print publication, in January 2006. In July 2012, Hannah Wheelwright founded the Young Mormon Feminists blog. Neylan McBaine founded The Mormon Women Project in 2010 and serves as the editor. This project supports feminist views within an orthodox and believing framework.

In December 2012, a group led by Stephanie Lauritzen organized the first Wear Pants to Church Day, where women broke with cultural conventions and wore dress pants to church. This event initiated a wave of public activism by Mormon feminists. It was followed by Let Women Pray, which asked LDS Church leaders to consider letting a woman pray in General Conference. The following April, Jean A. Stevens became the first woman to pray in an LDS Church general conference session. In 2013, Kate Kelly, Lorie Winder Stromberg, and Hannah Wheelwright founded the Ordain Women organization and website to host profiles of individuals calling for the ordination of Mormon women. On June 23, 2014, Kelly's bishop informed her that she had been excommunicated in absentia. The letter states that Kelly's excommunication was due not to her personal beliefs, but her "aggressive effort to persuade other Church members to [her] point of view and that [her] course of action has threatened to erode the faith of others", including "Six Discussions" aimed at other church members.

Feminist Mormon women of color founded the blog FEMWOC in March 2015 to promote the voices and experiences of women of color within the community. It was founded by Gina Colvin, Natasha Smith, Bryndis Roberts, Kalani Tonga, and Jennifer Gonzalez.

In 2015, an official essay was published on the church's website which surveyed 171 years of statements about a Mother in Heaven and confirmed that it was part of church doctrine. An accompanying essay stated that while neither Joseph Smith nor any other church leader ordained women to the priesthood, women do exercise priesthood authority without ordination.

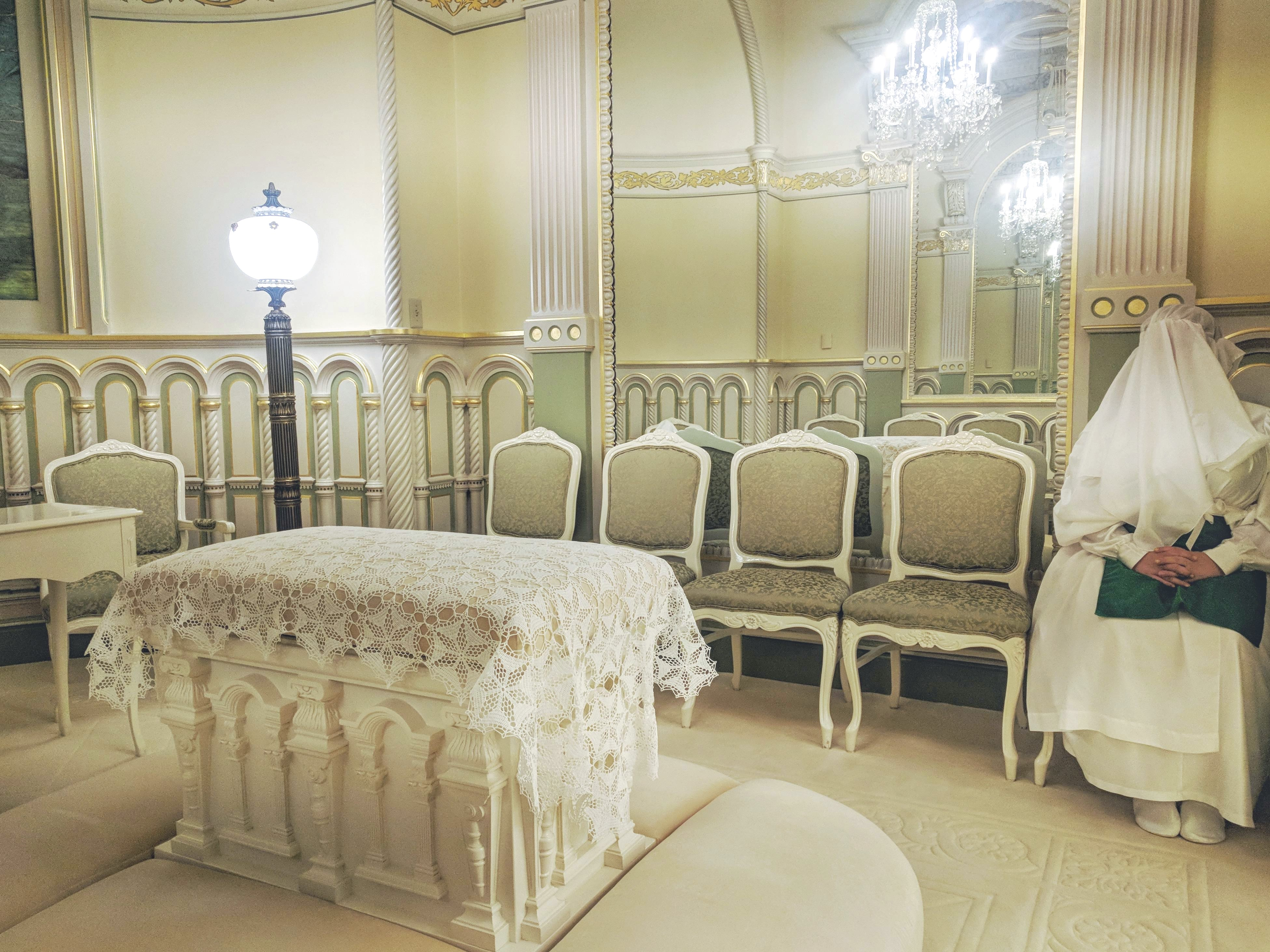
LDS woman in a sealing room wearing temple robes, including a veil

In 2017, the church announced that its female employees could wear "professional pantsuits and dress slacks" while at work; dresses and skirts had previously been required. It also announced at the same time that women who gave birth while working for the church would receive six weeks of paid maternity leave, and that all new parents regardless of sex would also be given a week of paid leave "to bond with their new child(ren) from birth or adoption."

In 2018, the church declared that their female missionaries could wear dress slacks if they wanted, except when attending the temple and during Sunday worship services, baptismal services, and mission leadership and zone conferences.

In the temple endowment, women were previously urged to be a priestess "unto her husband," while men were promised they will be priests to God. In January 2019, that was removed from the endowment process, in accordance with other changes that included more lines for Eve in their ritual performance of the Book of Genesis. Also in 2019, a letter from the church's First Presidency stated that "Veiling an endowed woman's face prior to burial is optional." It had previously been required. The letter went on to say that such veiling, "may be done if the sister expressed such a desire while she was living. In cases where the wishes of the deceased sister on this matter are not known, her family should be consulted." That same year veiling of women during part of the temple endowment ceremony was discontinued.

== Notable Mormon feminists ==
- Janice Merrill Allred
- Lavina Fielding Anderson
- Elna Baker
- Algie Eggertsen Ballif
- Mehrsa Baradaran
- Liberty Barnes
- Maureen Ursenbach Beecher
- Sue Booth-Forbes
- Mary Lythgoe Bradford
- Fawn M. Brodie
- Joanna Brooks
- Juanita Brooks
- Claudia Bushman
- Marie Cornwall
- Lucinda Lee Dalton
- Jill Mulvay Derr
- Judy Dushku
- Kathleen Flake
- Maxine Hanks
- Mette Ivie Harrison
- Valerie M. Hudson
- Sonia Johnson
- Kate Kelly
- C. Jane Kendrick
- Deborah Laake
- Cynthia B. Lee
- Melissa Leilani Larson
- Carol Cornwall Madsen
- Neylan McBaine
- Marianne Monson
- Linda King Newell
- Chieko Okazaki
- Lindsay Hansen Park
- Carol Lynn Pearson
- Esther Peterson
- Alice Louise Reynolds
- Emily Sophia Tanner Richards
- Linda Sillitoe
- Eliza R. Snow
- Peggy Fletcher Stack
- Rachel Hunt Steenblik
- Margaret Toscano
- Edward Tullidge
- Laurel Thatcher Ulrich
- Emmeline B. Wells
- Lynne Kanavel Whitesides
- Maurine Whipple
- Terry Tempest Williams

== See also ==
- Civil rights and Mormonism
- Mormonism and women
