= Mormonism and women =

Relationship of women to the Latter Day Saint movement

The status of women in Mormonism has been a source of public debate since before the death of Joseph Smith in 1844. Various denominations within the Latter Day Saint movement have taken different paths on the subject of women and their role in the church and in society. Views range from the full equal status and ordination of women to the priesthood, as practiced by the Community of Christ, to a patriarchal system practiced by the Church of Jesus Christ of Latter-day Saints (LDS Church), to the ultra-patriarchal plural marriage system practiced by the Fundamentalist Church of Jesus Christ of Latter-Day Saints (FLDS Church) and other Mormon fundamentalist groups.

== Definition of women ==
The LDS Church does not recognize trans women as women, but defines gender as the "biological sex at birth". The church teaches that if a person is born intersex, the decision to determine the child's sex is left to the parents, with the guidance of medical professionals, and that such decisions can be made at birth or can be delayed until medically necessary.

== Women in LDS Church history ==
Nineteenth- and early 20th-century accounts of Latter-day Saint history often neglected women's role in founding the religion. The 1872 history The Rise, Progress, and Travels of the Church of Jesus Christ of Latter-day Saints does not name any women. The seven-volume history, History of the Church of Jesus Christ of Latter-day Saints (1872) by B.H. Roberts only mentions a few women. A notable exception to this was 19th century historian Edward Tullidge, who Claudia Bushman said "stood alone as a Mormon feminist historian before the revitalization of the women's movement in the 1970s." However, a number of women had significant supporting roles; for example, Joseph Smith's wife, Emma Hale Smith, served as a scribe during translation of the Book of Mormon and was the subject of one of the church's early revelations, which included direction to compile the church's first hymnal. Emma Smith also served as head of the Relief Society, originally a self-governing women's organization within the church, which is one of the oldest and largest women's organizations in the world.

=== Women's suffrage ===
In the secular sphere, Utah Territory was at the forefront of women's suffrage; in 1870, it became one of the first states or territories in the Union to grant women the vote, though the federal government removed the franchise from women in 1887 via the Edmunds–Tucker Act. Education and scholarship was also a primary concern for Mormon women. Religious missions, like Bathsheba W. Smith's mission to southern Utah to preach "woman's rights", were launched. The Woman's Exponent magazine, the unofficial publication of the Relief Society, published a 1920 editorial in favor of "equal rights before the law, equal pay for equal work, [and] equal political rights", stating that a women's place is not just "in the nursery" but "in the library, the laboratory, the observatory."

In 1873, Ann Eliza Young gained national attention after she divorced and sued Brigham Young, who was President of the Church at the time. Ann Eliza accused Young of neglect, cruel treatment, and deserting herself and her children in the harsh conditions of frontier Utah. In 1874, she became one of the first women to testify before the US Congress, and was influential in the antipolygamy legislation passed in the late 1800s.

Late-19th-century Utah had the most liberal divorce laws in the United States at the time. The laws were advantageous to women: any woman who insisted on a divorce got one. The divorce rate in late 19th-century Utah came close to 30 percent. This divorce rate was inflated by people from other states seeking an easy divorce in Utah. In 1896, Martha Hughes Cannon was the first woman in the nation elected to state senate. She ran against her husband.

=== Laying on of hands and priesthood ===
In the early church, women would sometimes lay hands on another person to give them a special "women's blessing". Patty Bartlett Sessions recorded giving and receiving blessings from other women in her work as a midwife, as did Louisa Barnes Pratt in her life as a pioneer and a missionary. While not given by virtue of priesthood ordination, these "women's blessings" were a normal part of religion at the time. Relief Society president Eliza Snow believed that women did not need to be "set apart" to officiate in temple ordinances or in administering to the sick. She advised that women confide personal issues to the Relief Society president and her counselors, rather than the bishops. Women also participated in the Anointed Quorum in the early church.

Current LDS Church policy dictates that the act of giving blessings "by laying on of hands" is only to be performed by those ordained to offices in the Melchizedek priesthood, which offices are only held by men. However, a 2015 essay published in The Gospel Topics section of the church's website states that while neither Joseph Smith nor any other church leader ordained women to the priesthood, women do exercise priesthood authority without ordination.

Trans women may be able to receive the priesthood as long as they do not pursue medical, surgical, or social transitioning, as priesthood and temple ordinances are assigned according to birth sex.

== Polygamy ==
The status of women in the LDS Church has been a source of public debate beginning in the 19th century, when the church found itself at odds with the United States federal government over its practice of polygamy. (Note: E.g. Morrill Anti-Bigamy Act (1862), Edmunds–Tucker Act (1887).) Polygamy was introduced into the LDS Church when Joseph Smith prayed about the plural marriage as practiced in the Old Testament. The practice was established in the church in 1831. It continued until 1890 when Wilford Woodruff received a revelation, known as the "Manifesto", that stopped plural marriage. Following the Manifesto, many groups and individuals left the church in order to continue the practice; however, these groups have no affiliation with the church today.

Although some church leaders are known to have large polygamous families, two-thirds of the men who practiced polygamy in the church only had two wives. Women were able to divorce their husbands. Among the church population as a whole, at its peak, only 25 to 30 percent of members were part of polygamist families by 1870. Despite the legal and cultural issues related to the Mormon practice of polygamy, 19th-century women played a significant public leadership role in Latter-day Saint culture, politics, and doctrine. Some view the role of women in the 19th-century church as the zenith of women's institutional and leadership participation in the church hierarchy.

When speaking of polygamy, generally only two extremes are considered: "Mormon women were either highly empowered agents or submissive dupes." To note only these extremes, however, is to ignore that Mormon women chose to participate in polygamy and the fact that it was a part of their daily lives. Polygamy caused many women to grapple with their faith, but also allowed them to grow closer to God and to make and keep covenants.

Women in polygamous relationships at the time described the experience as a great trial that taught them self-denial. Many were Protestant converts and believed that their suffering helped to purify them. Even when the practice was established, it was not always accepted. Mothers discouraged their daughters from entering into plural relationships. For many, the decision to accept polygamy and practice it was an agonizing and difficult process that brought them closer to God. Some women did not accept polygamy at first and had to pray about, study, and question the practice before receiving an answer from God and accepting it. Elizabeth Graham MacDonald saw polygamy as a form of discipline that taught her subordination to God and her family. For some women, like Hannah Tapfield King, plural marriage was a way for women to obtain the highest blessings of salvation. King's husband was not a member of the church, and although he did convert, the couple was not able to be sealed in the temple. King was sealed to Brigham Young but only for the next life. She remained married to her husband throughout her life and never had relations with Young but was able to ensure blessings for herself through polygamy that she would not otherwise have received in this life. After accepting polygamy, Edith Turbin declared "I had rather to be the 20th wife of an honorably God-fearing Man, than to be the only wife of any one of two thirds of the Men in the world."

== Gender roles ==
Ezra Taft Benson stated that women have qualities of faithfulness, benevolence, and charity that balance the "more aggressive and competitive nature of man". Speaking of women working in professions equal to men, Howard W. Hunter said, "I hope the time never comes when women will be brought down to the level with men, although they seem to be making these demands in meetings held ... all over the world."

=== Church activity ===
Ecclesiastically, the LDS Church is firmly committed to traditional gender roles. Women have a certain degree of authority in some areas, including leadership positions with authority over children and other women, although these women leaders receive supervision and guidance by male priesthood-holding leaders. Women are "endowed" with priesthood power, but are not ordained to priesthood office. Though not considered clergy, women play a significant part in the operation of local congregations teaching classes to adults, teenagers, and children and organizing social, educational, and humanitarian activities. Women may also serve as missionaries, and a select few may perform certain ordinances such as washing and anointing on behalf of women in church temples. Women who have had an abortion (except in the case of rape, incest, or when the mother's life is in danger) are usually excluded from missionary service, as are women who have borne a child out of wedlock, and women under 40 who have been divorced. On October 6, 2012, church president Thomas S. Monson announced that all male missionaries, regardless of nation, could serve from age 18. Prior to the announcement, members from some countries were allowed to serve from the younger age to avoid conflict with educational or military requirements. It was also announced that young women may serve beginning at age 19 instead of 21. Missions typically last two years for males, 18 months for females, and 1 to 3 years for older couples.

Aside from the years starting in 1967 until 1978 women have been allowed to pray in sacrament meetings. Women leaders have regularly given sermons at the church's semi-annual general conference, but it was not until 2013 that a woman was invited to pray during a general session of the conference.

A survey conducted in 2012 of 500 Mormons in the United States showed that if they were married to a Latter-day Saint spouse, men and women had equal levels of church activity. Almost half of the men surveyed agreed that a good Latter-day Saint should obey without knowing why, while only 31 percent of women agreed. About 20 percent of the women stated that "women do not have enough say in the church." A 2024 social media post stating, "There is no other religious organization in the world ... that has so broadly given power and authority to women", was met largely with a negative response, with many LDS women stating it was untrue.

In 2019, it was announced that any baptized woman could serve as a witness for the baptism of a living person outside the temple, and any woman holding a current temple recommend, including a limited-use recommend, could be a witness for a proxy baptism for a deceased person, and any woman who was an endowed member with a current temple recommend could serve as a witness to sealing ordinances, living and proxy. In 2023 a local practice in San Francisco of having women sit on the stand before the congregation along with the male "presiding authorities" was ended by a regional church authority.

=== Marriage ===
LDS Church leaders have taught on many occasions that a woman should obey her husband. Some examples from the 1800s include that of Orson Pratt who wrote in 1852 that a woman should not marry a man unless she "had fully resolved herself to submit herself wholly to his counsel, and let him govern as the head". Additionally, apostles Heber C. Kimball and George A. Smith both taught in the temple in the 1840s that a wife must be "in subjection" to her husband. Young also taught in the temple that Adam only received the tokens of the priesthood after learning to not listen to his wife, and that women won't get back to God unless they follow a man back. Because these teachings on women were given by top leaders in temple they became unquestioned parts of LDS culture.

Other examples of teachings on LDS women in marriages include church president Harold B. Lee's 1972 article "Maintain Your Place as a Woman" which stated, "the wife is to obey the law of her husband" (with the caveat "only as he obeys the laws of God"). In contrast, Spencer W. Kimball said that a man "presides" rather than "rules". Early prophet Brigham Young stated of his wives, "The influence of my women over me is no more than the buzzing of a fly's wing in winter." He also stated, "A woman is the dirtiest creature, dirtier than a man", and "Men are honest, but if a woman won't lie, she is a miracle."

Initially, early church members defined "celestial marriage" as a polygamous relationship, but the term now refers to any marriage sealed in the temple. After the Manifesto prohibiting plural marriage, members felt that there was a lack of available Mormon men for women to marry, even though there were a sufficient number. Fiction from the Young Woman's Journal attempts to make religious marriage attractive by describing it as romantic. Unmarried LDS women are promised that if they are faithful, they will have the opportunity to marry in the afterlife.

==== Same-sex marriage ====
LDS women who are married to other women may receive church discipline including ex-communication. In order to receive church ordinances such as baptism, and to enter church temples, women are required to abstain from sexual activity with other women. Additionally, in the church's plan of salvation non-celibate lesbian individuals will not be allowed in the top tier of heaven to receive exaltation unless they repent, and a marriage to a man is a requirement for exaltation. However, they are allowed to attend weekly church worship services.

The church's policies and treatment of LGBT people has long been a source of controversy both within and outside the church. They have also been a significant cause of disagreement and disaffection by members. Transgender women are similarly barred from all temple ordinances including temple marriage as of 2023.

=== Working and responsibility to children ===
The Family: A Proclamation to the World states that "Mothers are primarily responsible for the nurture of their children", and an article on women in the church on the official church website states that women have "the greater gift and responsibility for home and children and nurturing there and in other settings." Numerous quotes from General Authorities support the assertion that women are fundamentally different from men, not just in their physical bodies, but in their spiritual makeup as well. Harold B. Lee said that women have a special "mother's intuition".

Brigham Young said "As I have often told my sisters in the Female Relief Societies, we have sisters here who, if they had the privilege of studying, would make just as good mathematicians or accountants as any man; and we think they ought to have the privilege to study these branches of knowledge that they may develop the powers with which they are endowed. We believe that women are useful not only to sweep houses, wash dishes, make beds, and raise babies, but that they should stand behind the counter, study law or physic [medicine], or become good book-keepers and be able to do the business in any counting house, and this to enlarge their sphere of usefulness for the benefit of society at large". Many women in Brigham Young's time worked; in 1874, Utah had a respectable class of literate and professional women and a visitor noted that no profession was closed to women. After the church officially ended polygamy, church members adopted a more mainstream Victorian view towards women's work, which confined women's roles to the home. By 1920, the church's ideals for women mirrored society's until the 1960s and 70s, when some Church leaders strongly advised against (presumably married) women working outside the home. Spencer W. Kimball said, "Numerous divorces can be traced directly to the day when the wife left the home and went out into the world into employment." Gordon B. Hinckley made allowances for single mothers and other women in similar circumstances: "I recognize [...] that there are some women (it has become very many, in fact) who have to work to provide for the needs of their families. To you I say, do the very best you can." A 1986 Ensign article emphasized that husband and wife share the responsibility of providing for their children's temporal needs, and that each family would prayerfully decide if a mother would go to work. Mormon women were to reject the secular values of individuality and devote themselves to the eternal women's roles of marriage, motherhood, and submissiveness.

The messages of church leaders regarding working women were reflected in the Relief Society's housework curriculum. Throughout the 1950s, Relief Society lessons were written by career women who balanced home and work life. Each lesson was listed with the author's name, allowing readers to match a name to the curriculum. However, by the 1970s, the church discontinued the lessons written by specific individuals and the use of an author's byline. Relief Society lessons were then created to be messages from the church as a whole, "providing no individual model of a professional woman for others to know and follow".

One 1990 study by Laurence Iannaccone found that starting in 1963, statements from church leaders were highly variable on women's topics. After Ezra Taft Benson's 1987 talk "To the Mothers in Zion" exhorting women to not work outside the home, many women quit their jobs and some women attending Brigham Young University (BYU) wondered if they should continue their studies. Then-BYU-president Jeffrey R. Holland stated that BYU especially welcomed women, and encouraged personal study and revelation about how to follow church guidelines. The same study found that as the church affirmed new sex roles, the number of living endowments increased (a sign of committed new membership) but the number of endowments for the dead decreased (a sign of committed, experienced member activity). It also found the opposite was true; as the church affirms traditional roles, the number of living endowments increased and the number of endowments for the dead increased.

Some scholars have found that multi-level marketing firms are more prevalent in Mormon communities due to these conflicting responsibilities. Operating a home-based business is seen as increasing the ability to provide for the family, while still physically being present in the home. LuLaRich is a documentary about LuLaRoe, a clothing company started by a Mormon couple, which explores these beliefs and how they translated into recruiting distributors for the product.

=== Clothing ===
Brigham Young said that women's dress should reflect that they are separate from the world. On one occasion he called his daughters together and announced that they were too quick to follow the fashions of "the world", and he insisted they modify their manner of dress. His older daughters had taken to loosening their tight skirts when they were to see their father, in order to make their bustles seem less conspicuous. Young asked them to stop wearing bustles altogether and implored them to cut back on the frivolities of their appearance in order to set an example for the rest of the female members of the church to follow.

After Joseph F. Smith complained about the indecency of some LDS women's attire, Amy Brown Lyman led the Relief Society, YLMIA, and Primary in issuing dress guidelines for Mormon women in 1917. These guidelines were not closely followed by members. In 1951, Elder Spencer W. Kimball gave the talk "A Style of Our Own: Modesty in Dress and Its Relationship to the Church", which was reprinted in the Church News and defined modesty for Mormons in the latter half of the 20th century. Kimball said that Latter-day Saint women should have a unique style of their own that did not include strapless dresses, shorts, form-fitting sweaters, or dresses with low necks or backs. Immediately following the talk, many women changed their wardrobes to conform to Kimball's instructions and called their wardrobes "kimballized", but the church issued no formal dress standards. In 1957, the Mutual Improvement Association published a pamphlet on modesty in general. It advised women against "flaunt[ing] one's figure", and also emphasized modesty in speech and conduct. A 1959 Improvement Era column counseled teenage girls to keep their clothing clean and ironed.

In the 1960s, the counterculture movement started to influence the dress of Mormon youth. Short skirts, beards and long hair for men, and dirty clothing became popular. Fearing that the counterculture fashions would negatively influence morals, leaders began to advise on dress codes more stringently. Men received instruction to avoid long hair and beards because of their association with counterculture; women's dress standards were created to protect their virtue. The miniskirt in particular was denounced as unfashionable as well as immodest. The church's modesty rhetoric in the 1960s and 70s also encouraged women to dress femininely especially as androgynous styles became more popular. A more feminine dress style was associated with acceptance of traditional feminine gender roles of the 1950s.

In 1965, the first For the Strength of Youth pamphlet was published, and the first presidency encouraged youth and their parents to conform to its regulations. It prescribed skirts that covered the kneecaps and forbade low-cut, strapless, and low-backed attire. It encouraged women to "always try to look feminine" and stated that slacks (rather than skirts or dresses) were appropriate only for hiking and other sports. The 1968 For the Strength of Youth pamphlet denounced soiled and sloppy clothing and said that women should not be in public with her hair in curlers. In 1972, the pamphlet was changed to state that skirts should be "of modest length." Dallin H. Oaks published a formal dress code for BYU in 1971, which allowed pant suits but no other pants for women. Jeans were allowed in 1981, and knee-length shorts in 1991. A specific prohibition against tattoos and multiple earrings was added in 2000. Sister missionaries also received special instruction in dressing professionally starting in 1977. The church published a dress code for its own employees in 1980, which did not allow pant suits.

Finding modest dresses, shorts, and swimsuits presents a challenge to some LDS women. The La Canada first ward in California sewed modest swimsuits for themselves in 1976. One group of LDS young women in Kansas worked with Nordstrom to propose modest dress ideas, garnering over 9,000 women's signatures in support of making more modest dresses available.

In 2012 and 2013, some LDS women participated in "Wear Pants to Church Day", in which they wore trousers to church instead of the customary dresses to encourage gender equality within the church. Over one thousand women participated in 2012.

In 2017, the church announced that its female employees could wear "professional pantsuits and dress slacks" while at work; dresses and skirts had previously been required.

In 2018, it was announced that female missionaries of the church could wear dress slacks except when attending the temple and during Sunday worship services, baptismal services, and mission leadership and zone conferences.

Until 2022, the For the Strength of Youth pamphlet for LDS youth defined modest dress standards for young women: "Young women should avoid short shorts and short skirts, shirts that do not cover the stomach, and clothing that does not cover the shoulders or is low-cut in the front or the back." The pamphlet also counseled women to only wear one pair of earrings. Women who have gone through the temple endowment and wear temple garments must cover their garments, which cover shoulders, midriff, and thighs.

In 2022, the church released a new edition of For the Strength of Youth which includes fewer prescriptive standards for dress and grooming. The new edition instead emphasizes the spiritual principles behind the standards. For example, the new passage which corresponds to the past edition's statement on modesty now reads: "Avoid styles that emphasize or draw inappropriate attention to your physical body instead of who you are as a child of God with an eternal future. Let moral cleanliness and love for God guide your choices." The wording in the new edition also eliminates the previous edition's differentiation between female and male modesty.

Some members feel that when leaders emphasize dressing modestly to young women, they only emphasize the sexualization of women's bodies and encourage women to judge each other by their physical appearance. Other members feel that modest dress is the first defense against immorality, and that dressing modestly will help individuals act modestly.

Trans women are counseled to dress and groom themselves as men, and are advised that those who socially transition will experience some church membership restrictions for the duration of this transition.

== Factors affecting mental health ==
Mormon women are no more likely than other women to report experiencing depression, however, Mormon women who experience depression have specific challenges. A 1993 dissertation by Marleen Williams found a few differences in how Mormon women experience depression. Compared to mildly depressed Protestant women, mildly depressed Mormon women felt more guilt and self-blame, took responsibility for others' behavior, and depended on others for approval. Compared to non-depressed Mormon women, mildly depressed Mormon women were more likely to have role conflicts and feel their gender role restricted their behavior. A 1984 study by David Spendlove found that poor health, low income, less education, and less perceived caring from spouse were positively correlated with depression in LDS women in Utah. Spendlove also found that for women in Utah in 1984, women who work "may be at a higher risk of depression" than those who do not.

Other studies have examined specific subgroups of Mormon women. A study by Ann Pritt in 1998 found that Mormon women who were sexually abused were more likely to feel distant from God, blame themselves for bad things that happen to them, and be more pessimistic in general compared to Mormon women who were not sexually abused (with both parties having received counseling at some point). Another study by Jacobsen and Wright in 2014 found that Mormon women who experience same-sex attraction feel isolation and worthlessness and need to form a positive self-identity.

== In the temple ==
=== Menstruation ===
In December 1866, Brigham Young gave advice that women should wait a week from the start of menstruation before participating in the endowment.

Some temples in 2012 still did not allow women to perform baptisms for the dead during their menstrual period, despite official policy to the contrary.

=== Endowment ===
A 1936 policy forbade women whose husbands were not endowed from receiving their own endowment, whether their husbands were members of the church or not. The ostensible reason for the prohibition was to maintain peace and harmony in the home. Gradually the policy changed, first for women whose husbands were members of the church, and then on 12 February 1986, for all women whose husbands were unendowed providing they have the consent of their husbands.

In the temple endowment, women were urged to each be a priestess "unto her husband", while men were promised they would be priests to God; but in January 2019, that was removed from the endowment process, in accordance with other changes that included more lines for Eve in their ritual performance of the Book of Genesis. Also in 2019, a letter from the church's First Presidency stated that "Veiling an endowed woman's face prior to burial is optional." It had previously been required. The letter went on to say that such veiling, "may be done if the sister expressed such a desire while she was living. In cases where the wishes of the deceased sister on this matter are not known, her family should be consulted." That same year veiling of women during part of the temple endowment ceremony was discontinued.

=== Prayer circles ===
In current Latter-day Saint temple practice, the endowment ritual contains a prayer circle, where some participants stand in a circle and repeat a prayer given by a single person. Women were first included in the ceremony on September 28, 1843. After 1846, it was uncommon for women to participate in prayer circles without their husbands. Under Eliza R. Snow's guidance, some women made women-only prayer circles. In 1896, the first presidency advised against Relief Society prayer circles, but some Relief Societies continued the practice. In 1978, the First Presidency discontinued all prayer circles except those performed in a temple as part of the endowment. Since members of prayer circles had to be approved by the first presidency, continuing this tradition in a worldwide church made for unwieldy paperwork.

== Religiously significant women ==
=== Heavenly Mother ===
Along with the promotion of women's rights in the secular sphere, women in Utah, like renowned poet Eliza R. Snow, spoke of women's equality in sacred matters. This included the development of a Heavenly Mother theology. Joseph Smith discussed the doctrine of a Heavenly Mother as early as the 1840s. The idea of a Heavenly Mother expanded to a loving mother who sent each of us off on our journey to this earth and who will welcome us back to her again after death. As written in poems by Mormon authors, "[Heavenly Mother] oversees key moments for individual souls in the Mormon progressive plan of salvation." These ideas were expressed throughout the early 1800s. Today, church leaders continue to mention Heavenly Mother, although less frequently and embellished than in early church history. Neal A. Maxwell affirmed the ideas or a homecoming expressed in Snow's poetry about Heavenly Mother by saying, "Could such a regal homecoming be possible without the anticipatory arrangements of a Heavenly Mother?"

In the 1970s and 1980s church members began to write speculations about a Heavenly Mother and even to pray to her in meetings. In the 1980s and 1990s the church stopped these practices. There were publications made in Dialogue during this time period that suggested that Heavenly Mother is the Holy Ghost. In 2015 an essay was published in The Gospel Topics section of the church's website, which surveyed 171 years of statements about a Mother in Heaven.

=== Eve ===
Mormonism rejected the Augustinian doctrine of original sin, which held that humanity inherits the sin of Adam and Eve in which they ate the forbidden fruit. This sin was historically blamed on Eve, and was thought to be the source of women's submissive and dependent state. The movement's second Article of Faith states, "We believe that men will be punished for their own sins, and not for Adam's transgression."

== Civil rights ==
=== Reproductive rights ===
The LDS Church opposes elective abortion based on a belief in the "sanctity of human life". The church allows members to abort pregnancies in some rare circumstances. According to an official statement, "The Church allows for possible exceptions for its members when: Pregnancy results from rape or incest, or a competent physician determines that the life or health of the mother is in serious jeopardy, or a competent physician determines that the fetus has severe defects that will not allow the baby to survive beyond birth." The statement goes on to say, "Abortion is a most serious matter and should be considered only after the persons involved have consulted with their local church leaders and feel through personal prayer that their decision is correct." The statement also clarifies that the LDS church does not favor or oppose specific legislation or public demonstrations concerning abortion.

In the past the use of birth control methods including artificial contraception was explicitly condemned by LDS Church leaders. Beginning in July 1916, apostles were quoted stating that birth control was a "pernicious doctrine" and that "limiting the number of children in a family...is sinful". As recently as 2003 a church manual was published containing a quote from the late church president Spencer W. Kimball stating that the church does not "condone nor approve of" measures of contraception which greatly "limit the family". The current church stance is that "decisions about birth control and the consequences of those decisions rest solely with each married couple" and that they should consider "the physical and mental health of the mother and father and their capacity to provide the basic necessities of life for their children" when planning a family. The church "strongly discourages" surgical sterilization like vasectomies and tubal ligation and encourages members to only turn to it for serious medical conditions after discussing it with a bishop. The church's insurance company Deseret Mutual Benefits Administrators which provides coverage for its employees does not cover any form of birth control and will only cover sterilization by vasectomy or tubal ligation for a couple if the woman has already had five children or is over forty.

=== Equal Rights Amendment ===
According to historian Ardis Parshall, in 1943, women within positions of leadership in the LDS Church backed the amendment.

In the 1970s, the LDS Church came out against the Equal Rights Amendment. The LDS Church in Utah requested that ten women from each ward attend the Utah International Women's Year in 1977 to support the church's position on the Equal Rights Amendment and other women's issues. The fourteen thousand attendees, mostly Latter-day Saint women recruited in their wards, voted on platforms before hearing their discussion and rejected all the national resolutions—even those that did not advocate a moral position opposed to that of the LDS Church. In 1978, the LDS church encouraged nine thousand female members in greater Las Vegas, Nevada, to canvass their neighborhoods with anti–Equal Rights Amendment pamphlets and encouraged all members to vote. Nevada did not ratify the amendment. Sonia Johnson fought against the church in support of the Equal Rights Amendment and was excommunicated; a December 1979 excommunication letter claimed that Johnson was charged with a variety of misdeeds, including hindering the worldwide missionary program, damaging internal Mormon social programs, and teaching false doctrine. Also in 1979, the Alice Reynolds forum was forbidden from discussing the amendment in the Alice Reynolds reading room at Brigham Young University; the club subsequently found a different place to meet.

== Dissent ==
Within and outside the church mainstream, there is a minority of LDS women who raise concerns regarding church policy and doctrine. However, any members who are viewed as publicly oppositional toward the church's current structure are subject to ecclesiastical discipline, including excommunication for apostasy. (Note: E.g. September Six, Kate Kelly)

== 20th and 21st centuries changes in church policies about women ==
The First Presidency made the Relief Society an auxiliary to the church, removing their independent financial status in 1970. In 1977, First Presidency member N. Eldon Tanner told a meeting of church leaders that presidency of the Relief Society should be considered a partner with the Melchizedek priesthood.

Other developments during the presidency of Spencer W. Kimball included having young women class advancements recognized in sacrament meeting and, in 1978, the First Presidency and Quorum of the Twelve Apostles issued a policy which approved of women praying in sacrament meeting. Women had been barred praying in sacrament meeting from 1967 to 1978. In 1980, the general presidents of the Relief Society, Young Women, and Primary were invited to sit on the stand with the male general authorities during general conference. In 1984, a woman spoke in general conference for the first time since 1931; since then, women have spoken in every general conference. In 1978, a conference session specifically for women was added, initially two weeks before the October general conference, which was later changed to one week beforehand, then to Conference Weekend itself in 2018. In the April 2013 general conference, Jean Stevens became the first woman to recite a prayer at a general session of a general conference.

In 1978, a policy that a woman was not allowed to be a Sunday School president was clarified to a bishop in a Boston suburb. Also in 1978, Alice Colton Smith, a member of the Relief Society General Board, remarked in a letter to Leonard J. Arrington that women were once permitted to join in or stand as an observer at the blessing of her baby, but now were rarely permitted to do so. In 1975, the LDS church allowed Maureen Ursenbach Beecher to continue to work in the History Division after the birth of her daughter. Previously, the church's policy was to terminate new mothers' employment; after consulting with their legal counsel, the church changed their policy to allow women employees to continue working after several weeks of maternity leave.

Brigham Young University (BYU), the LDS Church's flagship educational institution, has made several changes in its policy towards women. In 1975, the four-year, full tuition and boarding expenses presidential scholarship was changed from only being available to men to being available to an equal number of men and women. BYU established a Women's Research Institute in 1978. Among its directors over its 21 years of existence was Marie Cornwall. At the end of 2009, BYU restructured its Women's Studies Programs, freeing more money for research on women's issues by ending an institute staff, placing the Women's Studies Minor in the Sociology Department and thus putting all the money that had been split between research and staff directly into research expenditures.

In 2013, the church adjusted the leadership council in its missions to include a greater role for the wife of the mission president and by creating a new role, called "sister training leader". The new Mission Leadership Council expands the use of councils to govern the church at every level. Also in 2013, the organization Ordain Women was established by LDS women who supported the extension of priesthood ordinations to women. On November 1, 2013, the church announced that beginning in 2014, a general women's meeting, conducted by the Relief Society, Young Women, and Primary organizations, would be held in connection with its bi-annual general conferences. In 2015, the church appointed women to its executive councils for the first time: Linda K. Burton, president of the Relief Society, Rosemary Wixom, president of the Primary, and Bonnie L. Oscarson, president of the Young Women's organization, to three high-level church councils (one woman to each).

On March 18, 2026, a letter from the First Presidency to church leaders was written, saying, "The First Presidency and Quorum of the Twelve Apostles have determined that, effective immediately, the bishop may call a man or a woman to serve as ward Sunday school president". The letter also said, "If a man is called as Sunday school president, he must hold the Melchizedek Priesthood, and his counselors and secretary must be male members of the ward. If a woman is called as Sunday school president, her counselors and secretary must be female members of the ward." Previously, ward Sunday school presidents could only be men, which is still the case for stake Sunday school presidents and at the general church level, including the Sunday School General Presidency.

== Mormon feminism ==
Mormon feminism is a feminist movement concerned with the role of women within Mormonism. Mormon feminists advocate for a more significant recognition of Heavenly Mother, the ordination of women, gender equality, and social justice grounded in Mormon theology and history. The modern form of the movement has roots that go back to the founding of Mormonism, including the largely independent operation of the female Relief Society, priesthood blessings by women in early church history, and the women's suffrage movement in the western United States.

== Fundamentalist groups ==
Mormon fundamentalists are groups or individuals who have broken from the dominant form of Mormonism practiced by the LDS Church. Since the mid-19th century, numerous fundamentalist sects have been established, many of which are located in small, cohesive, and isolated communities in areas of the Western United States, western Canada, and Mexico. Mormon fundamentalists advocate a return to Mormon doctrines and practices which, they believe, were wrongly abandoned, such as plural marriage, the law of consecration, the Adam–God doctrine, the Patriarchal Priesthood, elements of the Mormon endowment ritual, and often the exclusion of blacks from the priesthood.

Plural marriage is generally considered the most central and significant doctrine separating fundamentalists from mainstream Mormonism. In Mormon fundamentalist groups, women are typically expected or encouraged to adhere to a strongly patriarchal perspective on women's roles and activities and, in many cases, participate in plural marriage.

Even though women in fundamentalist groups are often expected to rear children and other domestic tasks, it is not accurate to assume that all women in polygamous relationships in Mormon fundamentalist groups are powerless. Mormon women in fundamentalist groups experience their gender roles differently than women in the LDS church. In fundamentalists sects, sex is viewed as a necessary evil for reproduction. Women who are menstruating, lactating, or pregnant are not expected to have sex with their husbands. One fundamentalist woman said that because her husband had other wives, she didn't feel pressured to sexually satisfy her husband. Fundamentalist women help their husbands seek other wives, and many say that for their husbands to look for a wife without consulting existing wives would be akin to infidelity. Some wives in polygamous marriages feel closer to their sister wives than to their husbands. In some polygamous relationships, a wife nurtures her husband's relationship with his other wives by encouraging her husband to spend time with them. Sister wives help each other with childrearing, cooking, and other domestic tasks. Women in polygamous relationships have their own bedrooms, while their husbands are treated as visitors. Sister wives also often control the household's finances. The studies that examined the experience of fundamentalist women did not examine underage marriage, which the authors felt was a separate issue. The 2008 police raid of the FLDS Texas compound found that 12 girls were married before age 16 and sexually abused.

== See also ==
- Adam and Eve (LDS Church)
- Civil rights and Mormonism
- Criticism of Mormonism
- Heavenly Mother (Mormonism)
- Mormon feminism
  - DezNat (Deseret Nation) – an alt-right Mormon movement opposed to feminism
- The Mormon Women Project

== Sources ==
- Bradley, Martha Sonntag; Woodward, Mary Brown Firmage (1994), "Plurality, Patriarchy, and the Priestess: Zina D. H. Young's Nauvoo Marriages", Journal of Mormon History, 20 (1): 84–118, JSTOR 23286315
- Doctrine & Covenants 156:9
- Foster, Lawrence (1979), "From Frontier Activism to Neo-Victorian Domesticity: Mormon Women in the Nineteenth and Twentieth Centuries", Journal of Mormon History, 6: 3–22, JSTOR 23286013
- Hardy, B. Carmon (1994), "Lords of Creation: Polygamy, the Abrahamic Household, and the Mormon Patriarchy", Journal of Mormon History, 20 (1): 119–52, JSTOR 23286316
- Jorgensen, Danny L. (Spring 2001), "The Mormon Gender-Inclusive Image of God", Journal of Mormon History, vol. 27, Covenant Communications, Incorporated, pp. 95–126, ISBN 978-1-59156-284-9, OCLC 367597862
- Kimball, Edward L. (2005), Lengthen Your Stride: The Presidency of Spencer W. Kimball, Salt Lake City: Deseret Book, ISBN 978-1-59038-457-2
- Madsen, Carol Cornwall; Whittaker, David J. (1979), "History's Sequel: A Source Essay on Women in Mormon History", Journal of Mormon History, 6: 123–47, JSTOR 23286020
- Quinn, D. Michael (Fall 1994), "The LDS Church's Campaign Against the Equal Rights Amendment", Journal of Mormon History, 20 (2): 85–155
- Snow, Eliza R. (September 15, 1884), "To the branches of the Relief Society", Woman's Exponent, 13 (8): 61
- Tullidge, Edward W. (1877), The Women of Mormondom, New York: New York
- White, O. Kendall (1989), "Mormonism and the Equal Rights Amendment", Journal of Church and State, 31 (2): 249–267, doi:10.1093/jcs/31.2.249, JSTOR 23916795
