= Exponent II =

Mormon women's periodical and retreat

- Cover of the Fall 2014 / Winter 2015 issue
- Type: Periodical
- Format: Print (tabloid) and online
- Owner(s): Exponent II, Incorporated
- Founder(s): Claudia Bushman, Carrel Hilton Sheldon, Laurel Thatcher Ulrich, Judy Dushku, Sue Booth-Forbes and others
- Editor: Rachel Rueckert (2021–present; 9th)
- Founded: 1974
- Language: English
- Headquarters: Arlington, Massachusetts
- Circulation: 1200 (2024)

Exponent II is a quarterly periodical that publishes essays, poetry, and art created by women and gender minorities on the Latter-day Saint spectrum. Exponent II was founded in 1974, "poised on the dual platforms of Mormonism and Feminism ...to strengthen The Church of Jesus Christ of Latter-day Saints and to encourage and develop the talents of Mormon women." It has been described as the longest-running independent publication for Mormon women.

The name Exponent II was chosen in homage to a historic Latter-day Saint publication, the Woman's Exponent (1872-1914), because both publications were created to be an exponent, meaning one who promotes the voices of women. Exponent II continues to publish its print magazine and has grown to include a Mormon blog and annual women's retreat.

== Background ==
In 1970 The Church of Jesus Christ of Latter-day Saints consolidated the funds of its women's auxiliary, the Relief Society, into the central LDS Church budget. It also eliminated the beloved LDS women's publication, the Relief Society Magazine, replacing it with a general publication called the Ensign.

In 1972 Susan Kohler was browsing the stacks at Widener Library of Harvard University and discovered a 19th century Mormon women’s newspaper called Woman's Exponent. The magazine published poetry, essays, fiction, polygamy, and suffrage. Woman's Exponent hoped to "discuss every subject interesting and valuable to women."

Kohler was friendly with a group of second-wave feminist Mormon women in Cambridge, Massachusetts. Some of the women had previously collaborated on a book called Mormon Sisters: Women in Early Utah. Some had previously worked together on "The Pink Issue," a women-focused issue of Dialogue: A Journal of Mormon Thought and, as a Cambridge Ward Relief Society project, a guide to Boston.

The women, inspired by Woman's Exponent, organized two gala dinners to celebrate the historic publication. Maureen Ursenbach Beecher was the keynote speaker at the first gala. She spoke on Eliza R. Snow, second president of the Relief Society.

== Exponent II Magazine ==
In 1974, distressed by the loss of financial autonomy and their own women-led LDS publication, but also inspired by the discovery of the Woman's Exponent, a group of second-wave feminist Mormon women gathered together in Cambridge, Massachusetts and began work on their own publication, Exponent II . They named their newspaper after the recently discovered Woman's Exponent and hoped "to give Mormon women greater status, share news and life views, and foster friendships."

The women formed a non-profit organization to fund Exponent II. They first incorporated as Mormon Sisters, Inc., and later as Exponent II, Inc.

Laurel Thatcher Ulrich, Carrel Hilton Sheldon, Judy Dushku, Heather Cannon, Connie Cannon, and Sue Booth-Forbes were among the women who organized themselves to put Mormon women's voices in print. Claudia Bushman was selected as the newspaper's first editor. Carolyn Peters illustrated the newspaper.

=== First Issue ===
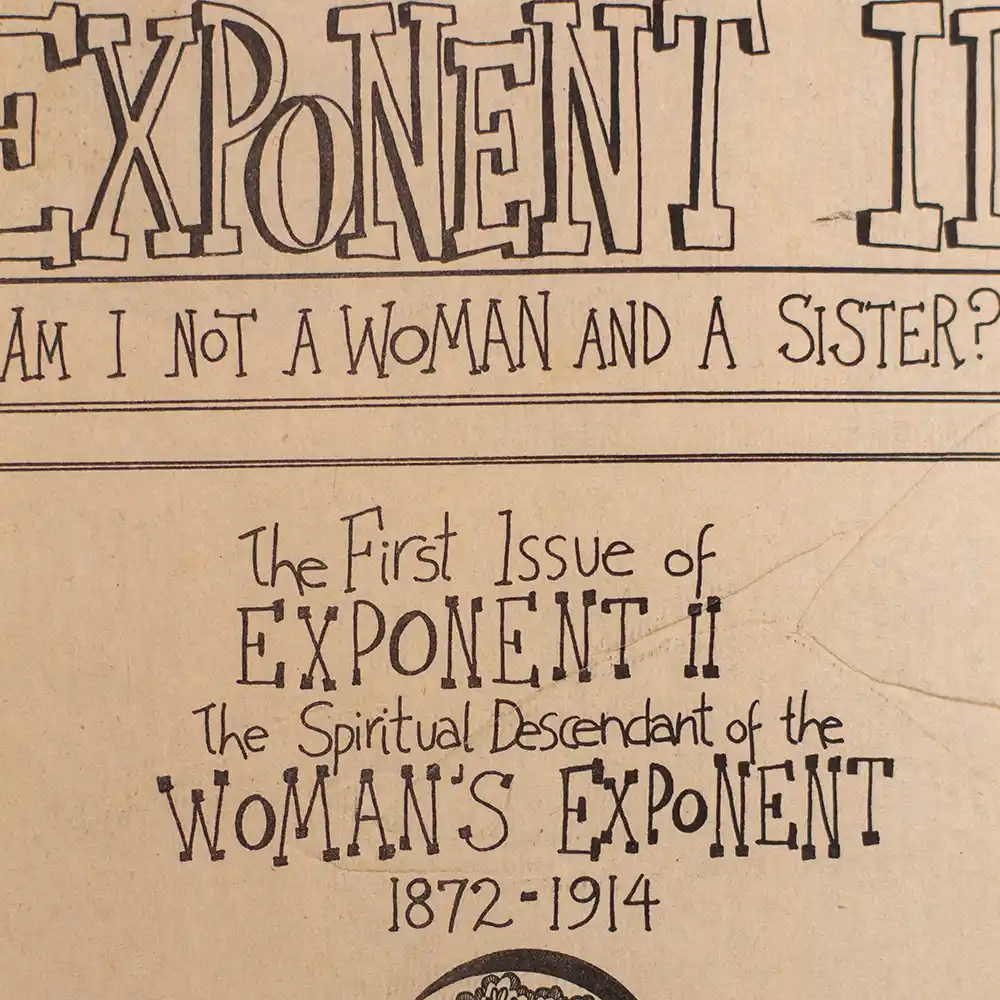

The first edition of Exponent II carried a banner headline reading "Am I Not a Woman and a Sister?" It offered articles on the Equal Rights Amendment, poetry, profiles of female Mormon civic leaders, scholars and entrepreneurs, and notices of study groups and retreats, all written by Mormon women.

=== Resistance ===
Shortly after the first issue of Exponent II was published, Robert D. Hales, then an assistant to the Quorum of the Twelve, was sent to Massachusetts from LDS Church headquarters in Salt Lake with a message for "Claudia Bushman’s Women’s Lib magazine." that Exponent II "should cease". Hales told Bushman that the church's Priesthood Correlation Program evaluated the newspaper and felt "it was in no way objectionable except the art," but felt association with the publication would damage the reputation of those involved. Bushman understood this to mean that her husband's position in the church would be affected if they continued associating with Exponent II. She resigned as editor.

According to Alice Colton Smith, women who led the church's female auxiliary, the Relief Society, were forbidden by church leadership to subscribe to Exponent II. Undeterred, Smith and other women subscribed secretly using the names of their husbands.

The women first organized as Mormon Sisters Incorporated. Carrel Hilton Sheldon remembered, "our choice of name offended some of our Mormon sisters because the name encompassed all Mormon women, not just a small group."

=== Early Supporters ===
The founding mothers of Exponent II were encouraged by local church leader and historian Richard Lyman Bushman, who was the first person to suggest the women start a newspaper. He is the husband of Claudia Bushman, first editor of Exponent II.

LDS Church Historian, Leonard Arrington helped the women secure a small grant from the Mormon History Association for library and copying expenses.

=== Paste-up Parties ===
During the first years of newspaper publication, layout was completed in the homes of group members at events called Paste-up Parties. "We pasted up the paper in my dining room with women, sometimes with their babies beside them on the floor, working at all hours of the day and night. We worked on light boards made by my husband out of junk wood from our basement. We taped the finished pages to the walls all around the room to measure our progress, as well as to get a sense of the flow and the look of the finished product. A typical scenario at my house was women working at the light boards and women proofreading pages on the walls, someone typing up corrections, and someone letter pressing titles."

=== Publication, staffing and circulation ===
Exponent II was originally published in newspaper format. Today it is published in full-color tabloid, or magazine format. It ranges in size from 16 to 40 pages.

Despite resistance from LDS Church leaders and some members, Exponent II received more than 4,000 subscribers within its first year. Print subscriptions dropped steadily through the 1990s and early 2000s. Today the print magazine ships 800 print magazines quarterly, and 200 digital subscribers read the magazine completely online.

=== Subscriptions ===
In 1974, a subscription to Exponent II cost $2 per year. The periodical is still sold on a subscription basis, in both print and online form.

=== Editorial Independence ===
Exponent II is editorially and financially independent of LDS Church authorities.

=== Magazine Sections ===
==== Sisters Speak ====
Since Exponent II inception, a very popular section has been the Sisters Speak column. In Sisters Speak a question is posed by editorial staff and then debated by readers who submit their responses for publication in the next issue of the magazine.

==== Artwork ====
Expoenent II publishes and promotes the artwork of Mormon Women and gender minorities exclusively.

==== Poetry ====
Poetry by LDS women is published on a variety of subjects including family, love, divorce, death, childbirth, peace, sorrow, and pain. Exponent II also publishes poetry about women's relationship and confusion about heavenly mother, the LDS feminine divine deity.

== 1980-2000 ==
Beginning in the 1980s, Exponent II has conducted annual residential retreats in the eastern US. During these Exponent II Retreats, women and gender minorities anywhere on the Mormon spectrum meet together to share experiences. Retreats focus on subjects important to Mormon women such as polygamy, faith reconstruction, peacemaking, women's ordination, Heavenly Mother, theology, aging, and parenting.

Exponent II was founded on the twin platforms of Mormonism and feminism, but the organization's goals have changed over time. In 1984 it changed its focus to publishing on topics of concern to women and of interest to all, on an "open forum" basis. Writers were encouraged to use a variety of writing forms and keep submissions Mormon-oriented. New guidelines were developed for general writing and poetry submissions at this time.

== 2000 to present ==
In 2007 Exponent II began publishing online.

=== 40th Anniversary ===
A 40th anniversary event was held in Boston in 2014, attended by 25 of the 1974 group, and current leaders of the Exponent II organization.

=== 2017 Embezzlement Scandal ===
In 2017 the Board of Exponent II announced that Suzette Smith, a former treasurer (2012 to 2017) had misappropriated funds. In December 2018 the scale of the embezzlement was revealed to be in excess of US$100,000, with over $191,000 taken in over 600 transactions. $84,000 of the embezzled funds were returned before and after discovery.

Smith was investigated by the FBI, prosecuted, and sentenced to prison in 2019, and new financial safeguards were put in place.

=== 50th anniversary ===
In June 2024 Exponent II editors released a double-sized issue featuring stories and poetry by Mormon women describing the founding of Exponent II and their experiences writing for the magazine or blog. Many shared personal experiences from Retreats over the years.

A special anniversary-themed Retreat was held September 20–22, 2024, at the Barbara C Harris Episcopal Camp and Retreat Center in Greenfield, New Hampshire. The keynote speaker at that event was Heather Sundahl, who co-wrote a book, Fifty Years of Exponent II, with Katie Ludlow Rich. The book includes a history of Exponent II's founding, its struggles, and a selection of essays and poetry that have appeared in the magazine during the past 50 years.

== Blog ==
With the blessing of the Exponent II editorial board, Caroline Kline, Jana Remy, and Deborah Farmer established a related blog called The Exponent in January 2005.

In 2023 the blog was brought onto the main Exponent II website, thus fully integrating the blog as one of the three "pillars" of Exponent II I.

Roughly two dozen Mormon women blog at Exponent II as part of the staff, rotating in and out of service as circumstances permit. The blog welcomes submissions from women and gender minorities who are not part of the staff and provides Mormon women a forum where they can discuss current events, faith struggles, doctrinal questions, heavenly mother, women's ordination, and feminist concerns.

Bloggers also write Come Follow Me lesson supplements written from a Mormon feminist perspective.

== Retreat ==
Since 1983, Exponent II has hosted an annual retreat in New England for women and gender minorities connected to Mormonism and feminism. Keynote speakers at Exponent II retreat are Mormon women who have made significant contributions to Mormonism and broader society, including Pulitzer Prize-winning historian and Exponent II co-founder Laurel Thatcher Ulrich, among others.

=== Pilgrimage Mini Retreats ===
Recognizing difficulties related to traveling to Exponent II for retreat, enthusiastic attendees established smaller, daughter retreats they called pilgrimage. One pilgrimage is held in each US time zone to accommodate women all over the United States. These Mormon women's retreats are Allegheny Pilgrims in the Eastern Time Zone, Midwest Pilgrims in the Central Time Zone, Rocky Mountain Pilgrimage in the Mountain Time Zone, and Northwest Pilgrims in the Pacific Time Zone.

== Other publications ==
The Exponent II organization has also produced and sold some supplementary items, which have included at least two books and a set of Mormon feminist stickers. Also sold through the magazine's website was the book All God's Critters Got a Place in the Choir by Laurel Thatcher Ulrich and Emma Lou Thayne. The directly published books were:

- Habits of Being: Mormon Women's Material Culture (2012) - a book of essays and poetry by Mormon Women including Jana Riess and Linda Hofmann Kimball
- Illuminating Ladies (2017) - a coloring book with full page biographies of 25 Mormon women, illustrated by Molly Hadfield

== Organization ==
Exponent II is overseen by its Board, led by a President, Vice-President and Treasurer. The board consists of an Editor-in-Chief, Managing Editor, two representatives of the Blog, and the Retreat Coordinator.

=== Presidents ===
- Barbara Christiansen (-2022)
- Lori LeVar Pierce (2022–present)

=== Editors-in-Chief ===
- Claudia Bushman (1974-1975)
- Nancy T. Dredge (1975-1981 and 2000-2009)
- Susan E. Howe (1981–1984)
- Susan Paxman (1984-1997)
- Jenny Atkinson (1997-2000)
- Aimee Evans Hickman and Emily Clyde Curtis (2010-2016)
- Margaret Olsen Hemming (2016-2021).
- Rachel Rueckert (2021-2025)
- Millie Tullis (2025–present)

=== Managing Editors ===
- Carol Ann Litster Young (2021- 2025)
- Natasha Rogers (2025–present)

=== Emeritus Board Members ===
- Barbara Christiansen
- Emily Clyde Curtis
- Nancy Dredge
- Judy Dushku
- Aimee Evans Hickman
- Linda Hoffman Kimball
- Deborah Farmer Kris
- Caroline Kline
- Margaret Hemming Olsen
- Laurel Thatcher Ulrich

== See also ==
- History of the Relief Society
- List of Latter Day Saint periodicals
