= Fiction on the Web =

United Kingdom literary magazine

- Editor: Charlie Fish
- Categories: Literary fiction, Genre fiction
- Frequency: 104 per year (online)
- Founded: July 1996; 29 years ago
- Country: United Kingdom
- Based in: London
- Language: English
- Website: www.fictionontheweb.co.uk
- ISSN: 2054-894X

Fiction on the Web is an online multi-genre literary magazine based in the United Kingdom that was established in July 1996. Its editor-in-chief since inception has been Charlie Fish. It claims to be "the longest-running short stories website on the Internet".

== History ==
The online magazine was launched in 1996, and was published quarterly until Autumn 2009, at which point it went into a three-year hiatus. It was relaunched in May 2012 in its current form, publishing two to three short stories per week. Prior to 2015, the magazine was entirely self-funded, but since June 2015 it has been supported by donations from Patreon members. In February 2018, a charity anthology of stories from the magazine's first 21 years was published, The Best of Fiction on the Web.

In January 2024, the magazine started publishing audiobooks, and hired a staff including Associate Editor Rick Taliaferro.

== Content ==
Fiction on the Web publishes short stories and audiobooks in six genres: real life (literary), funny, futuristic, fantastic, creepy, and criminal. Notable authors whose first published work of fiction was in Fiction on the Web include Rotimi Babatunde (winner of the Caine Prize for African Writing), Rob Boffard, Judy Dushku, Hanja Kochansky, Fred Skolnik, and Sigfredo R. Iñigo (winner of the 2009 Don Carlos Palanca Memorial Award for Literature).

The FISH list of lively independent literary magazines, compiled by Charlie Fish and hosted at Fiction on the Web, evaluates over 3,000 lit mags on 14 unique metrics, including community engagement, awards won, and editor transparency.

The magazine is a member of the Community of Literary Magazines and Presses.

== Recognition ==
In December 2023, Fiction on the Web was named as one of the 25 Best Lit Mags of 2023 by Chill Subs.

In December 2024, Fiction on the Web came second in the Chill Subs Community Favorites Best Lit Mag Awards, out of over 500 magazines nominated.

In December 2025, Fiction on the Web came fourth in the Great Editor(s) category of the Chill Subs Best Lit Mags of 2025.

== In other media ==
In 2021, Miryam Solomon released Fiction on the Web, named after the magazine, as the third track on her debut EP for the South London label Albert's Favourites.

== See also ==
- List of literary magazines
- List of magazines in the United Kingdom
