= Claudia Lauper Bushman =

American historian and editor

Claudia Marian Lauper Bushman (born June 11, 1934) is an American historian specializing in domestic women's history, especially as it relates to the history of the Church of Jesus Christ of Latter-day Saints (LDS Church). She helped found, and was the first editor of, the progressive LDS magazine Exponent II, has written American and LDS history books, and established a Mormon women oral history project at Claremont Graduate University.

== Early life and education ==
Bushman grew up in the Sunset District of San Francisco, where LDS church attendance was a regular part of her family life. She felt aware of gender issues from a young age, noticing that boys received more attention from the leaders in her ward than girls. Still, Bushman said that she felt like everyone in her ward was interested in what she was doing as a young person.

Claudia attended Wellesley College for her undergraduate studies under a full scholarship and described herself as a "lazy student." She met fellow historian Richard Lyman Bushman there while he was on his mission to the Cambridge area, and when he returned to Harvard to study, they renewed their friendship through study dates. They were married on August 19, 1955. Claudia noticed that while she had planned to live as a housewife, she longed to have a life outside of her home and family. She recalls that she learned to work hard from Richard. She attended classes at the Lowell Institute, and encouraged by her enjoyment of those classes, received an MA in American Literature from Brigham Young University while her husband worked there. She received her PhD in New England and American studies from Boston University after more than ten years of part-time study. Bushman attributed her admittance into the English PhD program to her husband's employment there, although she said that the chairman openly scorned her status as part-time student and housewife. She changed her focus to American Studies when she found out they wouldn't require more than one foreign language proficiency.

== Career ==
Bushman is a professor of American Studies emerita at Columbia University. In the summer of 2003, she was the director of the Joseph Fielding Smith Institute for Church History's Summer Scholars program. For the 2007–08 academic year, Bushman was an adjunct professor at Claremont Graduate University while her husband held the Howard W. Hunter chair at that institution. Bushman is the author of many books, most recently Contemporary Mormonism: Latter-day Saints in Modern America (Praeger Publishers, 2006). Her work focuses on the detailed lives of ordinary women.

=== Boston and Exponent II ===
In the 1970s, Bushman was part of a group of LDS women in Boston who would get together and discuss women's issues, especially as they pertained to the LDS church. When Eugene England was visiting Boston, Bushman suggested that Dialogue should do a women's issue, and he agreed. By the time all the articles were written, England had given up the editorial position to Robert Rees, who believed that polygamy and the priesthood were more important issues for Mormon women than birth control and church service. The issue went forward anyway, and this first issue of Dialogue devoted to women's issues is often called the "pink" Dialogue. Inspired by Susan Kohler's discovery of the Woman's Exponent in the Harvard Widener library, Bushman and her friends wrote a series of institute courses on the topic of LDS women's history, which they taught to an audience of about fifty institute students. To celebrate their work on the institute course, Bushman and her group held an Exponent dinner, where Jill Mulvay (Derr) met Maureen U. Beecher, a worker in the church history department under Leonard Arrington.

In 1974 Bushman was involved in the founding of Exponent II. The group of about twelve women pasted pages together in their homes, often with children underfoot. Using money Leonard Arrington gave the group for research purposes, they printed their first issue, which they gave out for free to solicit subscriptions. Bushman helped edit the institute courses and published them in Mormon Sisters: Women in Early Utah, which originally Bushman and her friends self-published and sold to their friends and subscribers. Hoping to excite interest in others, they sent copies of the Exponent II to all the wives of general authorities, but found that some of the wives would prefer not to receive the magazine. They gained attention from some influential people in Salt Lake City, and the group of women wrote letters defending their involvement with the magazine, although at this point Bushman had decided to resign from working on Exponent II.

When Claudia Bushman was publishing Exponent II, her husband Richard was a stake president in the LDS church and writing for Dialogue. According to Richard, the church was afraid that his position in church leadership would make Exponent II seem like an official church publication when it was not, and Claudia resigned as editor. When L. Tom Perry flew down to talk with Bushman and her friends, he said that while he found nothing objectionable in the magazine, he said it was not suitable for the wife of a stake president to help in the writing of a magazine with such "negative potential." Claudia saw this as a double standard, as Dialogue was not a church publication either, but no one had a problem with her husband writing for it.

=== Delaware, New York City, and Claremont ===
In Newark, Delaware, Bushman started the Newark Historical Society with some of the students in her Newark history class at the University of Delaware. Bushman later was in charge of the Delaware historical commission for five years. In celebration of the anniversary of the Constitution and Delaware's statehood, she and her staff reenacted colonial balls, staged a parade, and released a million ladybugs, Delaware's state insect.

The women's studies program committee at the University of Delaware refused to cross-list her honors history course on women because she was a Mormon.

Bushman has been heavily involved in cultural activities and public relations in New York City. She was the producer of the youth celebration that coincided with the dedication of the Manhattan New York Temple.

From 2008–2011 Claremont University appointed Richard Bushman to start a Mormon studies program, and Claudia taught classes as an adjunct professor. During her time at Claremont, Claudia established an oral history project to document the lives of Mormon women. The oral history project created more primary documents for students to study, and the book Mormon Women Have Their Say compiles some of the experiences gathered. The Mormon women oral history project continued after Bushman's departure.

== Attitude and faith ==
Bushman's feminism in 1971 was one of acceptance. She felt that a woman who chose to be a housewife shouldn't be demeaned: "If some women find themselves in prison at home, others consider it heaven on earth and make it that for their little angels." She found that her children constantly developed in interesting ways, while "a book just sits on a table, never improving by itself at all." Bushman found that when she was a part-time student, "school made housework a pleasure," and noted that "there is lots of space between being a devoted stay-at-home mom and being an executive in a Fortune 500 company."

Bushman's attitude to teaching is to put students "in a position where they can learn things." Bushman fostered student enthusiasm by editing their writing, encouraging them to present and publish, and participating on exam committees. In giving advice to young women, Bushman advises them to choose something reasonable and make it the right thing, rather than zealously pursuing an impossible goal. She advocates a type of flexible ambitiousness and to always do "something," whether it be volunteering or writing a book proposal.

Bushman is still a faithful member of the LDS church. In an interview with Yahoo! News, she said "They would have to kick me out [of the church]." At a Sunstone panel, she said that she loves having a church community wherever she goes and that the church needs women who aren't afraid to speak out.

== Personal life ==
Claudia Bushman is married to historian Richard Lyman Bushman. The Bushmans are the parents of six children. Claudia was recognized as mother of the year for the state of New York in 2000. She is the sister of Bonnie Goodliffe, who for forty years was one of the organists for the Tabernacle Choir at Temple Square.

== Published work ==
- Mormon Sisters: Women in Early Utah (1997). Utah State University Press. ISBN 978-0874212334 Also published in 1976 by Emmeline Press.
- So Laudable an Undertaking: The Wilmington Library, 1788-1988 (1989) Delaware Heritage Press. ISBN 978-0924117008
- America Discovers Columbus: How an Italian Explorer Became an American Hero (1992). University Press of New England. ISBN 978-0874515763
- "A Good Poor Man's Wife": Being a Chronicle of Harriet Hanson Robinson and Her Family in Nineteenth-Century New England (1998). University Press of New England. ISBN 978-0874518832
- Mormons in America (1999). Oxford University Press. ISBN 9780195106770
- Building the Kingdom: A History of Mormons in America (2001). Oxford University Press. ISBN 9780195150223
- In Old Virginia: Slavery, Farming and Society in the Journal of John Walker (2001). Johns Hopkins University Press. ISBN 978-0801867255
- Mormon Women Have Their Say: Essays from the Claremont Oral History Collection, ed (2013). Greg Kofford Books. ISBN 978-1589584945

== See also ==
- Mormon feminism
