= Kate Kelly (feminist) =

American human rights lawyer (born 1980/1)

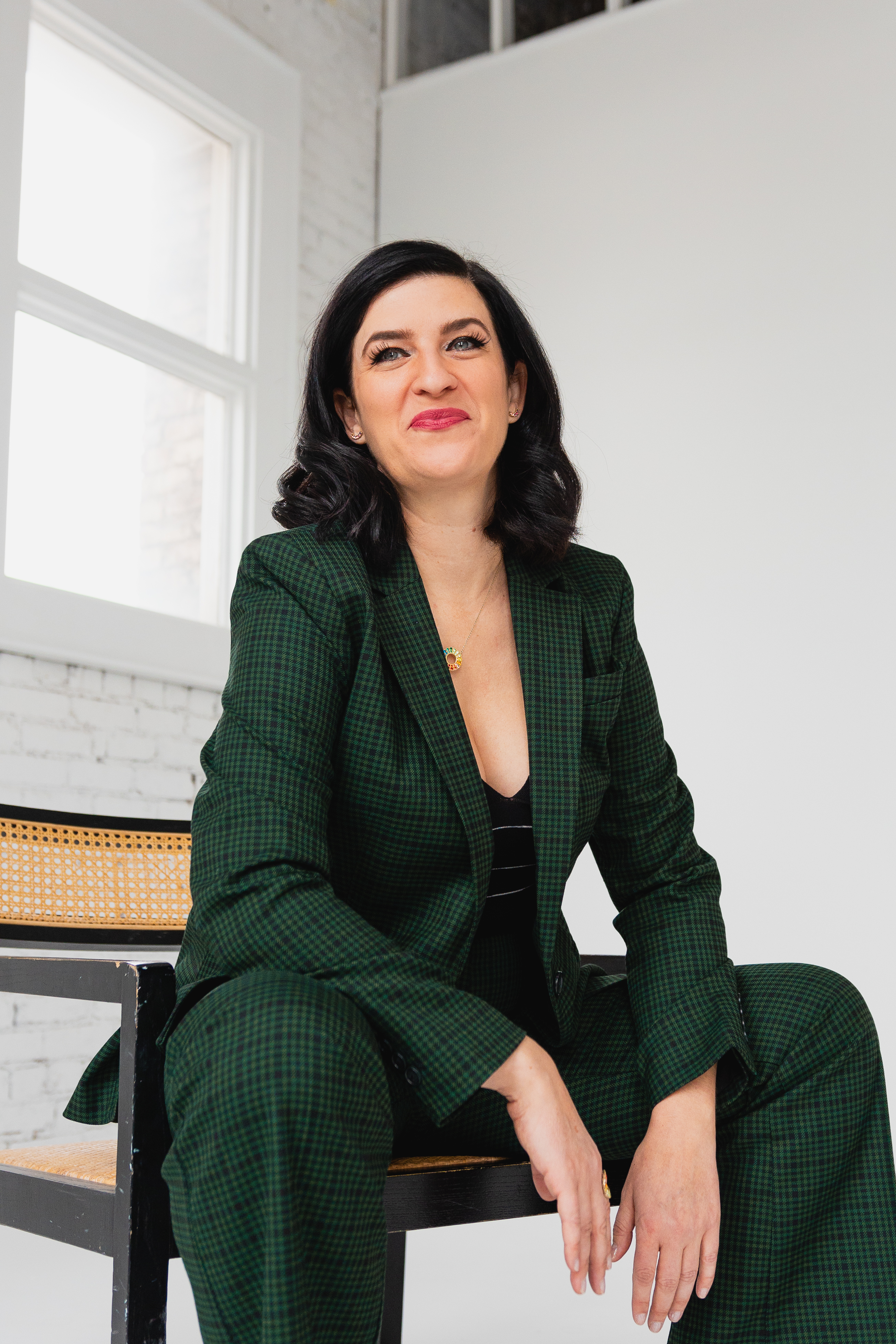
- Kate Kelly, 2024, photographed by Seth McCausland
- Born: October 1981 (age 45); Arizona, U.S.
- Education: Brigham Young University (BA); American University (JD)
- Occupation: Human rights lawyer
- Known for: Founder of Ordain Women | Equal Rights Amendment advocate
- Spouse: J. Neil Ransom (m. 2006; div. 2016)
- Website: www.katekellyesq.com

Kathleen Marie Kelly (born 1980 or 1981) is an American activist, human rights lawyer, and Mormon feminist who founded Ordain Women, an organization advocating for the ordination of women to priesthood offices in the Church of Jesus Christ of Latter-day Saints (LDS Church). Kelly was excommunicated from the church in 2014. She is also a nationally known advocate for ratification of the Equal Rights Amendment (ERA) and abortion access.

Kelly came out as queer in 2019 and began a same-sex relationship with a Catholic writer pushing for similar goals within the Catholic Church.

== Early life and education ==
Kelly was born in Arizona to Jim and Donna Kelly. One of five siblings, she grew up in Hood River, Oregon. Her mother is an attorney and her father a retired newspaper publisher and university administrator. Both parents were converts to the LDS Church, and her father at one time served as the bishop of a local congregation, known as a ward.

Kelly graduated from Brigham Young University (BYU) with a Bachelor of Arts degree in political science in 2006. While at BYU, she organized a campus free speech protest of nearly 100 students concerning the firing of a university employee for criticizing student elections. While at BYU, and for a time after she graduated, Kelly wrote for The Mormon Worker, a Mormon left-leaning publication modeled after the Catholic Worker newspaper founded by Dorothy Day. In 2010 Kelly founded "Mormon May Day" as a day for liberal or radical Mormons to hold a collective fast and make their voices heard within Mormonism on progressive themes.

Kelly earned a Juris Doctor from the Washington College of Law at American University in 2012.

== Career ==
During Kelly's legal career, she has worked for many different human rights and advocacy organizations. She is the host of the podcast Ordinary Equality on the Wonder Media Network, and the author of Ordinary Equality: The Fearless Women and Queer People Who Helped Shape the U.S. Constitution and the Equal Rights Amendment (Gibbs Smith, 2022). Kelly's book Ordinary Equality was favorably reviewed by Oprah Magazine, Publishers Weekly, Booklist, and Kirkus Reviews.

=== Ordain Women ===
In May 2013, Kelly founded Ordain Women, an organization advocating for the ordination of women to the priesthood in the LDS Church. Local church leaders asked Kelly to cease her campaign. Kelly subsequently demonstrated on Temple Square during the church's April 2014 General Conference, after which she was excommunicated in June 2014 in absentia after declining to attend a disciplinary council. She instead submitted a written defense through her representative Nadine Hansen, a fellow Mormon feminist attorney, and hundreds of letters on her behalf from supporters.

In the weeks before and after her excommunication, Kelly urged followers to stay in the church and "raise hell" if they could do so while maintaining their mental and emotional health. Kelly appealed her excommunication, first to her stake president, then to the church's First Presidency, all of whom rejected the appeal.

Kelly often states that “equality is not a feeling,” meaning gender equality is something that can be objectively measured and does not depend on the individual feelings of worthiness or individual women feeling valued by their community.

==== Catholic Church ====
In October 2015, Kelly participated in the attempted ordination of a female Roman Catholic priest coordinated by the Association of Roman Catholic Women Priests, an organization claiming affiliation with the Catholic Church. Ordination of women to the Catholic priesthood goes against canon law and any known participants are automatically excommunicated.

=== Women's rights ===
In January 2017, Kelly helped plan the Utah contingent of the Women's March on Washington and helped organize several hundred women to attend the march in Washington, D.C. The following Monday she organized and emceed one of the largest marches in Utah's history on the State Capitol in Salt Lake City. At that rally, Kelly said, “I'm sick and tired of men making laws about our bodies and our choices and our lives without consulting us.”

In May 2019, Kelly helped facilitate workshops in Uruguay and Argentina for the United Nations Special Rapporteur on Freedom of Religion or Belief, Dr. Ahmed Shaheed. Kelly then participated in workshops put on by the Rapporteurship in Geneva in September 2019 and New York in October, situations where the human rights of women, sexual orientation and gender identity minorities clash with the right to freedom of religion or belief. The workshops culminated in a report which was presented to the Human Rights Council in early 2020.

Kelly has long spoken out about sexual harassment and assault against women. In January 2020, with a group of other women and activists, she performed the viral anti-rape protest anthem "Un Violador en Tu Camino" (The Rapist in Your Path) outside the Harvey Weinstein trial in New York City. Kelly said of the action, "pointing the finger of blame for sexual assault at the appropriate target ... was a cathartic experience, to feel our collective feminist power as a force for good."

=== ERA ===
In August 2012, the same year she graduated law school, Kelly attended her first rally for the ERA on the front lawn of the United States Capitol. Kelly then helped revive the group Mormons for ERA originally founded by excommunicated Mormon feminist Sonia Johnson.

In 2017, after the women's marches worldwide turned attention to women's rights, Kelly helped draft an ERA ratification resolution in Utah (one of 15 unratified states at the time) and helped recruit state senator Jim Dabakis to sponsor the resolution. The ERA has not been ratified in Utah and is opposed by the LDS Church, but Kelly continues to advocate for ratification there. Kelly said in Truthout that more interest in the ERA exists today because, "I think that women are realizing that nothing that we have is permanent. Nothing is too sacred to be rolled back, and things that we have taken for granted in the past are now up for grabs." She is featured in the MSNBC documentary This Happened: On Account of Sex on the ERA. For the 100th anniversary of the ratification of the 19th Amendment, Kelly wrote a piece for Rewire News connecting votes for women to the continued campaign to ratify the ERA saying, "Today, two fights are left unwon—universal suffrage and ratification of the ERA."

In December 2019, Kelly led a group of ERA activists in a demonstration on Temple Square in Salt Lake City. The group gathered outside the Salt Lake Temple and sang Christmas carols with reinvented lyrics about equality. They then projected an "ERA YES" symbol, which was over three stories tall, on the LDS Church's conference center.

In January 2020, Kelly launched a podcast called Ordinary Equality on the past, present and future of the ERA. The title of the podcast was chosen from a quote by Alice Paul, the author of the ERA in 1923, who said of the amendment: "Most reforms, most problems are complicated. But to me there is nothing complicated about ordinary equality." Ordinary Equality has been recommended by the Today Show and Marie Claire as well as featured on shows such as WNYC's All Of It with Alison Stewart. The podcast was mentioned in a story about the ERA in The New York Times, "The Roadblocks to Equal Rights for Women, a Century Later" after the U.S. House of Representatives voted to remove the original deadline on ERA ratification in March 2021.

Kelly has written about how the ERA will combat discrimination on the basis of sexual orientation and gender identity. She also co-wrote a piece with Virginia delegate Danica Roem, the first out-and-seated transgender state legislator in U.S. history, called "The Equal Rights Amendment Can’t Be Defeated by Anti-Trans Scare Tactics" about the role transgender women are playing to get the amendment ratified. Kelly wrote in The Advocate in August 2020 that the LGTBQIA community needs to be more vocal in its support of the ERA, "to get the protection and recognition that well over 50 percent of the population deserves — for women, girls, nonbinary folx, our transgender siblings, and all marginalized genders and sexual orientations."

Because of her zeal for the ERA, Kelly was featured in a 2020 Glamour magazine piece where she said her excommunication "was a gift because it set me free to work on other causes and things I am passionate about and places that actually need me and value my work" and that "that freedom of religion includes freedom from religion."

On June 29, 2020, Kelly was co-counsel on an amicus curiae brief filed on behalf of the ERA youth activism organization GenERAtion Ratify in the case Commonwealth of Virginia v. David S. Ferriero. The amicus brief argues:

The plaintiff states' effort to resolve the century-long movement to guarantee gender equality in the Constitution, we urge the court to not view the Equal Rights Amendment as only our grandmother's fight. Rather, we urge the court also to recognize its importance to young and diverse advocates of this generation that the Amendment be added to the Constitution. Young advocates have led the movement to ratify the Equal Rights Amendment since its inception. Supporters of the Equal Rights Amendment recognize the expressive function it serves and the important message it will send to young people: that gender equality is among our nation's highest values... Both as an expression of our country's values and as a means for change, the Amendment has the potential to further young Americans' interests in a broader guarantee of gender equality in all aspects of American life.

In May 2022, Kelly wrote an Op-Ed arguing that the ERA and abortion are tied. She said, "If we at long last finalize the ERA, we can achieve abortion access based on equal citizenship."

== Personal life ==
Kelly served a one-and-a-half-year mission for the LDS Church in Barcelona, Spain, and as a result is a fluent Spanish speaker. She has also lived and worked in other Spanish-speaking communities such as San Jose, Costa Rica, and San Cristobal de Las Casas, Mexico.

Kelly married J. Neil Ransom in the Salt Lake Temple in 2006. The couple were "childless by choice". On March 14, 2016, Kelly confirmed she and her husband had divorced.

Kelly experienced controversy in spring 2015, one year after her excommunication, for a GoFundMe page she created to raise $1,448 to replace her broken MacBook Air laptop. While Kelly did successfully raise funds in excess of her goal, some critics accused her of having inappropriate or subversive intentions for how she would use the newfound fame she gained from her Ordain Women activism.

By 2016, Kelly no longer claimed religious affiliation with any particular denomination or group. In 2018 she founded "Sacred Space", her own feminist/womanist, interreligious, inclusive celebration of women and nonbinary people of all faith traditions, along with Yale divinity professor and Baptist preacher Eboni Marshall-Turman and trans Jewish activist Abby Stein.

On April 15, 2019, Kelly came out as queer on Twitter. She is dating Catholic writer and theologian Jamie Manson, whom she initially met at a women's ordination conference in 2015. In January 2020 she was quoted for the first time in the media and identified as queer: "'As a queer woman, I cannot tell you how elated I am to finally see myself reflected in our nation's most foundational document,' added Kelly."

== See also ==
- Mormonism and women
