= Lucinda Lee Dalton =

American Mormon suffragist and early feminist

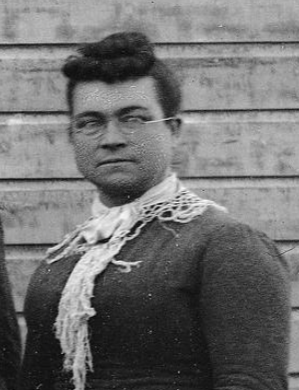
- "Mrs. Dalton" teaching in Ferron; likely Lucinda

Personal details
- Born: Lucinda Lee; February 9, 1847; Coosa County, Alabama
- Died: November 24, 1925 (aged 78); Manti, Utah
- Spouse(s): Charles Dalton (m. 1868; died 1883)
- Children: 6

Lucinda Lee Dalton (born Lucinda Lee; February 9, 1847 – November 24, 1925) was a Utah teacher, and suffragist. She shared her views through essays and poems published in the Woman's Exponent, a periodical for Latter-day Saint women.

Raised by members of the Church of Jesus Christ of Latter-day Saints and devout to the faith, Dalton was a feminist. As a child, she felt jealous of boys for the freedom and privileges they enjoyed and felt that girls were neglected by the education system. She became a women's rights activist, believing that women should have the right to suffrage, education, property, control over their money, and custody of their children. As a teacher, she advocated for equal educational and recreational opportunities for girls.

Dalton supported polygamy, arguing that it allowed more women to marry whom she deemed the few "good men", and bore six children with her husband Charles, who married her as his fourth wife. Her writings have been noted by critics for poetically conveying the role and struggles of Mormon women in her time.

== Early life ==
Dalton was born in Coosa County, Alabama, to Eliza Foscue and John Percival Lee. Her parents joined the LDS Church in Texas in 1849, and they made the trek to Utah Territory shortly after their conversion. In 1851, Dalton's family moved to the San Bernardino Valley in California as part of a Mormon expedition led by Amasa Lyman and Charles C. Rich. Seven years later her family moved to Beaver, Utah. Despite her family's poverty, Dalton's parents tried to teach her at home and let her attend school as long as possible. There were many children in her family, and at the time, many teenage girls stayed home to help with childcare and housework, but Dalton's family encouraged her to go to school. Since her family moved between rural areas, her education was scattered and not very methodical. Her teacher in Utah tutored her during lunch and after school and started training her to be a teacher herself. At age 12, her father founded a private school where Dalton helped teach. At age 16, Dalton became a teacher herself for an "infant school."

Also around age 16, Dalton's younger brother grew gravely ill. According to her autobiography, she fasted and prayed that her brother's life would be spared, and while she prayed this way he remained alive, although still ill. When Dalton's mother wished that her son's sufferings would end, Dalton stopped praying that his life would be spared and instead prayed that God's will be done. Her little brother died shortly thereafter.

== Marriage to Charles Dalton and family life ==
Lucinda Dalton was the fourth wife of Charles Wakeman Dalton, and they were married in 1868. Lucinda resented the expectation that she be meek and obedient in her marriage. Charles assured her that husbands have obligations to their wives as wives do to their husbands. She came to the conclusion that she should marry Charles because of a spiritual witness they experienced together: "I felt that we were in the presence of the hosts of heaven; and a direct incontrovertible testimony was given me that it was the will of God and not my will that I should accept this man for my yokefellow."

She and Charles had six children together. Before her first child Charles's birth, Lucinda had a premonition that her son would not live very long. She told her mother that the dress she sewed for him was like a funeral shroud, and after baby Charles's death at age two, she buried him in it. Lucinda's second child, a daughter named Rosette, also died in infancy. Dalton often references these lost child infants in her poetry. Her third child, Clifford, was born on February 18, 1875. Charles was a joint owner of a store in Beaver and also hauled freight to surrounding areas. However, his income was not sufficient to support his four wives and many children. Dalton taught school in Manti, Beaver, Payson, Ferron, and Ogden.

When Lucinda's father remarried, her sister Emma came to stay with her, and Emma married Charles in 1871. In 1876, Emma left Charles and Lucinda, as well as the LDS Church, and moved to Arkansas and then California.

After Charles's death, Lucinda Dalton applied to cancel her temple sealing to Charles in 1884: "though I know he had many imperfections ... now the brethren say he is unworthy, (though I know not who appointed them to judge him,) they urge that I stand in a very insecure position, and that for my children's sake, as well as my own, I ought to marry again." Dalton feared that by remaining sealed to Charles, she would forfeit her claim to her children. Perhaps because Charles was a drinker, her "brethren" considered him unworthy of his sealing. Her sealing cancellation was approved in 1887 and then revoked after her death in 1931.

== Feminist views and writings ==
Since undeniably there are more good women than good men on the earth who will dare decide that it would not be better for all potent Custom to allow two or more of these good women to marry one good man ...

— Dalton, on polygamy

As a child, Dalton felt jealous of boys for the freedom they enjoyed. They could travel alone without worrying about their reputation and were often bribed to attend school, while girls were, in her opinion, educated reluctantly. One of her teachers thought it would be wasteful for her to study algebra, as she already had sufficient education for a housewife. As a young woman, she felt that women lived on a higher moral level than men. She saw polygamy as a way to allow more women to marry the few good men, arguing that it gave more women the opportunity to marry. She also considered it ironic that prostitution was tolerated but polygamy was considered depraved.

Dalton argued for girls and boys to have equal recreational and educational opportunities and for women to have fair wages. Dalton advocated exercise for girls, including swimming and shooting. She believed that women had the right to suffrage, education, property, control over their earned money, and custody of their children. She was a strong believer in moral temperance and argued that parental hypocrisy caused many children to imitate their parents' actions. She said that it was a woman's religious duty to educate herself. She urged women to take advantage of public resources like libraries and museums, or if time did not permit, to enlarge their minds at Relief Society meetings.

Dalton applied the logic of abolitionism to the cause of women's freedom. She said that just as no one should be made a slave because of their race, women should not have to be subservient because of their gender. She saw the Victorian ideals for women in marriage as part of that slavish subservience. She argued that since a woman loses all her property when she marries, that it would be more advantageous for her to not officially marry so she could still buy and sell land and have legal claim over her own children and her own body. Dalton also argued that new brides should be allowed to decide when they have their first child. Some of her ideas were surprisingly radical for a Mormon woman at the time, and she and Elizabeth Cady Stanton agreed that women needed to protect themselves from unjust laws.

Dalton taught for sixty years. She taught her pupils energetically in spite of having crude educational resources. In 1891, Dalton encouraged other women teachers to ask for a raise. The board of education did give the teachers a raise, but considered Dalton responsible for their petitioning and demanded that she pay the difference from her salary. When Dalton refused, they replaced her with a male teacher. Luckily, the city of Payson requested that Dalton teach at their school, and she moved there happily. Later she taught in Ogden and Manti. She served as an officer of the territorial women's suffrage association. Her sister Rose was vice-president of the Utah State Chapter of Women Voters.

== Death and legacy ==
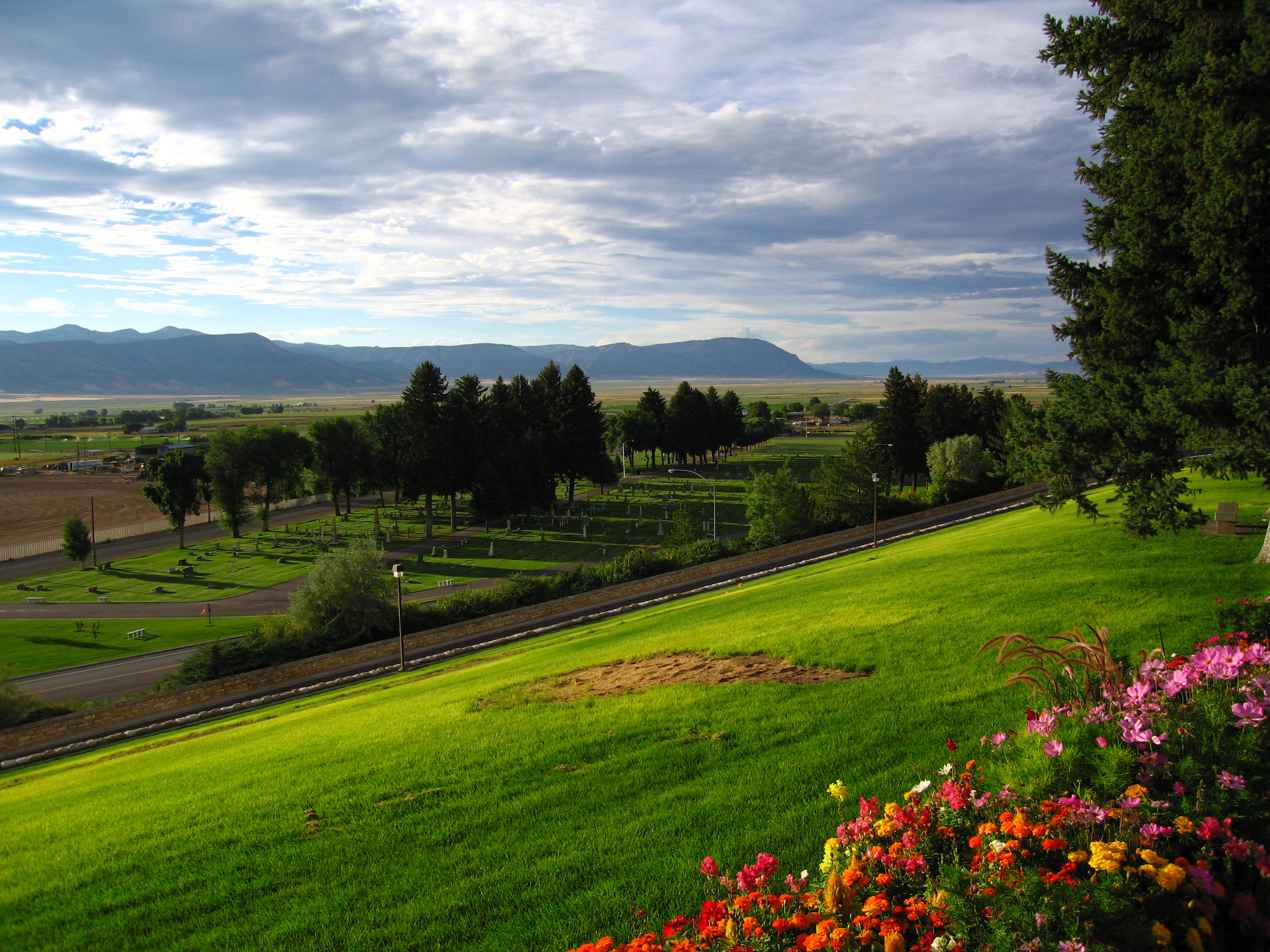
A view of the Manti Cemetery, where Dalton was buried

Dalton died on November 24, 1925, in Manti, Utah, survived by two of her children. Her funeral was held at the North Ward Chapel in Manti on November 27; she was buried in the Manti Cemetery.

Edward Tullidge, a fellow Latter-day Saint contemporary with Dalton, wrote that she was "a lady in whose writings are manifested the true spirit and independence of the Mormon women", saying that "the vigor and vivacity of her poetic productions are suggestive of a future enviable fame."

Another Latter-day Saint, Jill Mulvay, in Sunstone, called her poems "refreshingly imaginative, devoid of maudlin sentiment which marked much of the poetry of her age." A Dialogue review of a book containing her poems considers her position:

Could there be a more 'queer yoking' than the polygamist and the suffragist? In her amazing 'Woman,' Dalton refutes the traditional Christian view of woman's subservient position. She counters the Christian image of woman as the cause of humanity's fall from grace with the more enlightened 'latter-day' view of woman as a divine daughter of God, as one who fell to 'seek knowledge, the God-like prize.' Her play on the notion of latter-day redemption continues to the end of the poem with the last two lines: 'The Word has gone forth that when all is done, / the last shall be first forever' (6).

In a thesis on Dalton authored by Sheree Bench: "As an essayist Dalton defends her religion calls for the expansion of women's political and economic opportunities and asserts that the elevation of women is crucial to achieving the potential of both sexes. As a poet she is a compelling writer who reveals in her poems her apprehensions and aspirations her faith and feminism much of her poetry reflects the same commitment to reform that is clear in her essays and she uses both genres do effective political work." Another thesis writer believed that Dalton's poem Winter Winds "demonstrates the consistent opposition between male-identified and female-identified natural elements within LDS women's literature."

== Selected works ==
The items on this list are taken from Sheree Bench's thesis on Dalton unless otherwise noted. In her many contributions to the Woman's Exponent, Dalton is often credited as "L.D.D."

=== Essays ===
1872–3

- "A Plea for the Boys". Woman's Exponent. 1 (11): 86–87. November 1, 1872.
- "Love thy Neighbor As Thyself". Woman's Exponent. 1 (13): 101. December 1, 1872.
- "Exercise for Girls". Woman's Exponent. 1 (17): 131. January 31, 1873.
- "Moral Temperance". Woman's Exponent. 1 (19): 150–151. March 1, 1873.
- "And Murders Increase in the Land". Woman's Exponent. 1 (23): 184. May 1, 1873.
- "Letter to the Relief Society". Woman's Exponent. 2 (1): 3. June 1, 1873.
- "The Way They Do". Woman's Exponent. 2 (6): 46. August 15, 1873.
- "Woman's Voice". Woman's Exponent. 2 (6): 47. August 15, 1873.
- "Assertion Is Not Proof". Woman's Exponent. 2 (7): 54. September 1, 1873.
- "Woman Suffrage". Woman's Exponent. 2 (11): 86. November 1, 1873.

1874

- "That Bill". Woman's Exponent. 2 (16): 127. January 15, 1874.
- "Government, People and Privileges (part 1)". Woman's Exponent. 2 (21): 167–168. April 1, 1874.
- "Government, People and Privileges (part 2)". Woman's Exponent. 2 (22): 171. April 15, 1874.
- "A Talk With the Sisters". Woman's Exponent. 2 (24): 191. May 15, 1874.
- "The First-born". Woman's Exponent. 3 (8): 63. September 15, 1874.

1880

- "Correspondence". Woman's Exponent. 8 (16): 122. January 15, 1880.
- "Our Opinion". Woman's Exponent. 8 (18): 138. February 15, 1880.
- "Not Dead, But Sleepth". Woman's Exponent. 8 (20): 158–159. March 15, 1880.

1894

- "Shall Utah Become a State Without Woman Suffrage?". Woman's Exponent. 22 (15): 113. April 1, 1894.

=== Poems ===
1873–6

- "The World is Progressing". Woman's Exponent. 1 (23): 182. May 1, 1873.
- "Grim Duty". Woman's Exponent. 2 (5): 43. August 1, 1873.
- "Woman's Sphere". Woman's Exponent. 2 (14): 106. December 15, 1873.
- "Woman Arise!". Woman's Exponent. 3 (2): 10. June 15, 1874.
- "Addendum. Most Respectfully to Queery". Woman's Exponent. 3 (18): 138. February 15, 1875.
- "Indian Summer". Woman's Exponent. 4 (11): 81. November 1, 1875.
- "Answer to What are We Men to Do, by R. W. Eastbrooks, Exponent, April 15, 1876". Woman's Exponent. 5 (3): 17. July 1, 1876.

1878–80

- "Questionings". Woman's Exponent. 6 (21): 161. April 1, 1878.
- "To Query, and All My Dear Sisters in Zion". Woman's Exponent. 6 (24): 185. May 15, 1878.
- "Gleams of Light". Woman's Exponent. 8 (6): 41. August 15, 1879.
- "Through Darkness, Light". Woman's Exponent. 8 (7): 49. September 1, 1879. (Note: The Bench thesis erroneously dated this poem as August 30, 1879.)
- "A Day of Mother-Life". Woman's Exponent. 9 (6): 89. November 15, 1880.

1885–93

- "A Little Girl's View of the Mormon Question". Woman's Exponent. 14 (7): 49. September 1, 1885.
- "Sundered". Woman's Exponent. 17 (8): 57. September 15, 1888.
- "Woman". Woman's Exponent. 21 (14): 107. January 15, 1893.
