= Tyrone Guthrie Centre =

Annaghmakerrig, Irish state's creative retreat

The Tyrone Guthrie Centre, often known as Annaghmakerrig, is a residential facility for creative artists. Located at Annaghmakerrig, Newbliss, County Monaghan, Ireland, it was founded in 1981. The house was the family home of theatrical director Sir Tyrone Guthrie, and he bequeathed it to the Irish nation in 1971, to be used as an artistic retreat. The centre is a residential workplace open to professional practitioners in all art forms. Creative residencies are for periods of two weeks to one month, depending on the time of year, and whether staying in the Big House (fully catered) or in one of the five self-catering cottages.

The Tyrone Guthrie Centre is grant-aided by The Arts Council of Ireland and the Arts Council of Northern Ireland (ACNI), and is further supported by the Office of Public Works (OPW).

== History ==
Tyrone Guthrie left, in his will:

...my said dwelling-house, furniture, pictures and chattels and the income of my residuary estate to be used for the purpose of providing a retreat for artists and other like persons ... so as to enable them to do or facilitate them in doing creative work.

The gift of the house, in 1971, was accepted by the Irish government, and it opened to guests in 1981.

== Facilities ==
The Tyrone Guthrie Centre is situated within a gated 500-acre (2.0 km^{2}) wooded estate.

In the main residence, the "Big House", guests receive all meals. Each bedroom includes a writing or work desk and chair, and has its own selection of books and paintings, and a view. All bedrooms have en-suite shower rooms. Linen and towels are provided.

Up to eleven guests can stay in the five self-catering cottages (beds and bed couches).

Eight well-lit and heated studio spaces are also available, along with a music room (with grand piano and harpsichord), a mirrored dance studio that opened in 2006, and the Ulster Garden Village Performance Studio (with grand piano).

== Approach ==
Residencies at the centre are by application only and are selective. Applicants must have some track record in their field. Once granted, residences are for two weeks for those seeking and accepted for the "Big House" and up to one month for those in the self-catering cottages.

Once resident, guests are welcome to work as they wish. The only stipulation, as set out in the donor's will, is that all guests staying in the Big House must gather nightly for a communal dinner, generally held at 7 p.m., and nowadays in the kitchen of the Big House.

== Notable guests ==
The centre has since hosted more than 5,000 retreats, with the list of Irish writers, composers and artists including such as Seamus Heaney, Brian Friel, Sebastian Barry, Anne Enright, John Banville, Colm Tóibín and Colum McCann as well as Maurice Craig, Michael Harding, Colette Bryce, Nuala Ní Chonchúir, Phil Coulter, Mary Dorcey, Brian Kennedy, Sam McAughtry, Nell McCafferty, Peter McCann, Roisin Meaney, Honor Molloy, Anne Rigney, and Derval Symes.

International authors have also completed residencies at the centre, assisting them to complete or polish existing writing projects. These have included Australian authors Luke Davies and Linda Jaivin, British author Bella Pollen, and Canadian musician Loreena Mckennitt.

== Management ==
The first Director of the centre was Bernard Loughlin (1981-1999), who managed it with his wife and oversaw its initial setup and the reintegration of the estate. Loughlin was succeeded by Regina Doyle in an acting capacity (1999-2001), then by Sheila Pratschke (2001-2007), Pat Donlon (2007-2010) and Robbie McDonald (2010- early January 2021). Dr Éimear O'Connor took up the position in mid-January 2021.

== Publication ==
To celebrate the 25th anniversary of the retreat centre in 2016, a book with a selection of materials from projects connected to the facility (imagined, advanced or finished there) was published. Entitled simply "Annaghmakerrig," it was edited by the centre's then director, Sheila Pratschke, working with two selectors, Evelyn Conlon for writing and Ruairi O Cuiv for visual art, and contains work exclusively by guests of the centre, including Colm Toibin, Joseph O'Connor, Alice Maher, Patrick Scott, Rosita Boland, John Banville, Claire Keegan, Gerald Barry, and a remembrance of Guthrie as theatre director by Eugene McCabe, and a childhood memoir by Joseph Hone.

== See also ==
- Anam Cara Writer's and Artist's Retreat
- Cill Rialaig
