= Anam Cara Writer's and Artist's Retreat =

Creative retreat, West Cork, Ireland

Anam Cara Writer's and Artist's Retreat is a project in the village of Eyeries, County Cork, Ireland, which provides accommodation for writers and other creative workers. It was founded in 1998, and has hosted more than a thousand writers, artists, composers and choreographers since then.

== History ==
The retreat centre is owned and directed by Sue Booth-Forbes, a teacher, writer, editor Booth-Forbes, later holding several editorial positions.

In November–December 1997 she searched with her daughter, and, after a hint from an academic writer friend, Claudia Harris, in December 1997 purchased a property in the village of Eyeries, on the West Cork part of the Beara Peninsula. This was launched as the Anam Cara Writers Retreat in summer 1998. The retreat name, which means "soul friend," was chosen partly to pay tribute to the works of John O'Donohue.

Over the more than twenty years, over 1,000 creative guests - writers, composers, choreographers, visual artists - have visited. Several guests have included dedications to its director in their issued work.

== Facilities and operations ==
The retreat house comprises a set of private rooms, and a number of common spaces, with a library in addition to books in most rooms. Within the grounds are private working locations have been developed, in garden settings, by a duck pond, and on a landscaped river bank. There is also a sauna, and a hot tub.

Anam Cara offers two broad types of retreat: guided and self-directed. The guided workshops, usually hosted by 1-2 coaches or teachers, and occupy several weeks each year. For the rest of the year, creative guests can develop their own work.

== Artistic competitions, events and publication ==
The retreat has sponsored competitions for many years, with prizes including free visits to the facility. The location also hosts a range of events.

The retreat has published a book, in aid of Pieta House, Diving into the Mystery: Studies in the Creative Process.

== Recognition and guests ==
Some who have commented on their experiences include Nessa O'Mahony, former US Poet Laureate Billy Collins, Alex Barclay, Man Booker Award finalist Jhumpa Lahiri, chef Gerry Galvin, Bernard O'Donoghue, Leanne O'Sullivan, Sassa Buregren, Ulf Lindström and Réaltán Ní Leannáin.

== See also ==
- Cill Rialaig
- Tyrone Guthrie Centre, Annaghmakerrig
