= Derval Symes =

Irish painter

Derval Symes is an Irish artist. Her work is mainly abstract, using oil paint and other mixed media, although there is a strong landscape element to her work.

Born in Dublin in 1964, she is a graduate of Middlesex University and Coventry University, where she graduated with a BA in Fine Art in 1991. She now lives and works from her home in County Leitrim.

She has had many solo and group exhibitions. Her works have been exhibited at The Applecroft Gallery in Sligo, the Droichead Arts Centre in Drogheda, the Hallward Gallery in Dublin, the Powerscourt Centre and the Dock Arts Centre in Carrick-on-Shannon.

She has exhibited in Coventry and London. Many of her works are held in public and private collections in Ireland, USA and Europe.

Symes received a bursary for a residency at the Tyrone Guthrie Centre in 2004. She also received a bursary from Leitrim County Council in 2006 for artists born or living in Leitrim. In 2005, the book Earthworks by Philomena Kearney-Byrne about the works of Derval Symes was published by BackYard books.

== Publications ==
- with Kearney-Byrne, Philomena (2005). Earthworks. BackYard Books. ISBN 978-0955109201.
