= Sue Booth-Forbes =

Teacher, writer and editor, operating a creative retreat in Ireland since 1998

- Born: Susan (L.) Larson; Provo, Utah
- Citizenship: US, Ireland
- Education: Brigham Young University
- Occupations: Editor and coach, English teacher
- Children: 2
- Relatives: Clinton F. Larson (father)
- Writing career
- Language: English

Susan Booth-Forbes (formerly Paxman, née Larson), is an American-Irish teacher, writer and literary editor. She co-founded the progressive Mormon women's journal, Exponent II, in 1974, and was its longest-serving editor, from 1984 to 1997. She operated the Anam Cara Writer's and Artist's Retreat in West Cork, Ireland, for over twenty years, hosting and supporting more than 1,000 writers and other creative artists. Before her editorial career, as a high school English teacher, she was one of two plaintiffs in a successful legal action over discrimination against female staff by her employer when she was pregnant in 1971, winning a declaration of unconstitutionality in a US Federal court.

== Life ==
=== Early life ===
Susan Larson was born to Clinton F. (1919–1994) and Naomi Larson (née Barlow) (1923–2010) of Provo, Utah, U.S.; her grandfather was the athlete Clinton Larson. Her father was an academic at Brigham Young University and a poet and playwright; he was the university's poet-in-residence for many years. She has a sister. The family were active Mormons, members of the Church of Jesus Christ of Latter-day Saints.

=== Early career ===
==== Virginia ====
Larson studied at Brigham Young University (BYU), qualifying with a degree in English and Political Science, and with a Secondary Teaching Certificate.

She started her teaching career, in Utah, in December 1966; the same year, she married John Monroe Paxman, at the Salt Lake City Temple. The couple moved to Charlottesville, Virginia in 1969, after John Paxman became a student at the University of Virginia School of Law. She held teaching posts in local schools. After being denied a routine renewal of contract as an English teacher at Albemarle High School in the summer of 1971 due to a pregnancy with a due date in December, she, as the family's main breadwinner, had to find a new job.

She took a job as an office manager of a research lab at the University of Virginia Medical School, working up to her last week of pregnancy and returning one month later.

==== The Paxman-Gough constitutional case ====
Paxman, who stated that she had been surprised by the restrictive Virginia maternity rules, as those in Utah had been more flexible, and shocked when the county school board upheld the initial decision, became one of two plaintiffs in a lawsuit challenging rules across Virginia around employment discrimination due to pregnancy. She won a declaration of the unconstitutionality of such rules in 1975, and damages to include lost pay, but, on appeal, concluded in 1980, losing recompense other than an entitlement to reinstatement and partial cover for legal fees. While originally certified as a class action potentially including all pregnant teachers in the state, it was later decertified, but after an early ruling in the case, in 1972, the discriminatory rules were dismantled statewide anyway.

=== Massachusetts ===
The Paxmans moved to and lived for an extended period in the greater Boston area, including in Cambridge, Massachusetts.

==== Exponent II ====
Paxman was a member of the team producing Exponent II, a magazine by, and largely for, Mormon women, from its inception, and on the masthead from the second issue, in October 1974. She remained heavily involved until 1997, and in some form after, She served as its fourth Editor from spring 1984 until 1997, as Susan L. or Sue Paxman until 1996, then as Sue Booth-Forbes. The magazine addressed a wide range of issues, including feminism, reproductive rights, peace campaigns and other aspects of the roles and potential of women.

==== Eliza Dushku ====
Along with several family members, Paxman served as an on-set guardian (a Screen Actors Guild-mandated role) for actress Eliza Dushku, from her first serious film performance (This Boy's Life). Her mother, Judy Rasmussen Dushku, a fellow Mormon from the same region and a friend, was also on the Exponent II team. In 1993, she was present for three weeks in this role during the filming of True Lies, and she backed Eliza Dushku when she, many years later, alleged an off-set sexual assault by a member of the production team - which Dushku at the time reported only to her mother, a brother, and a different family friend - and commented on the overall industry situation at that time.

==== Other work ====
Booth-Forbes also worked for the Cambridge University Press. Just prior to moving to Ireland, she worked as communications director for a quasi-public agency in Boston.

=== Ireland ===
With a divorce, after over 30 years, due to be finalised in November 1997, and looking for a new direction, and having led multiple retreats linked to Exponent II, Booth-Forbes joined in a month-long literary retreat with friends, including Mary Lythgoe Bradford, in Connemara in August 1997, In December 1997, she purchased a property near the small village of Eyeries in West Cork, on the Beara Peninsula, launching a residential creative retreat, Anam Cara Writer's and Artist's Retreat, in June 1998. Over twenty-one years, more than 1,000 creative guests - writers, composers, choreographers, and visual artists - went on a retreat.

In 2018, Booth-Forbes launched a publishing company, Anam Cara Publishing.

== Personal life ==
Booth-Forbes has two children, three grandchildren, and five nephews and nieces. She became an Irish citizen in 2012.
