= Judy Dushku =

American political scientist and Mormon feminist

- Born: Judith Ann Rasmussen; March 30, 1942 (age 84); Rexburg, Idaho, U.S.
- Children: 4, including Nate and Eliza

Academic background
- Education: Fletcher School of Law and Diplomacy, Brigham Young University

Academic work
- Discipline: Political scientist
- Sub-discipline: Comparative and transitional politics, American government
- Institutions: Suffolk University
- Main interests: Politics and government, Mormon feminism, educational development

Judith Ann "Judy" Dushku (née Rasmussen; born March 30, 1942) is an American academic political scientist, journalist, writer, and humanitarian. An active member of the Church of Jesus Christ of Latter-day Saints (LDS Church), and well known as a Mormon feminist, Dushku cofounded the Mormon women's journal Exponent II, was the Relief Society president for the Boston stake of the Church of Jesus Christ of Latter-day Saints, became lead founder of a humanitarian agency in Uganda, and is a professor of government at Suffolk University (Boston, Massachusetts), specializing in comparative politics and the interaction of policy and gender since the 1970s. Dushku has been dean of a satellite campus, has won two major awards at Suffolk, and has been a Fulbright Senior Specialist. Dushku was extensively quoted by the media regarding Mitt Romney during his presidential candidacy. Her daughter, Eliza Dushku, is a successful television and film actress.

== Life ==
=== Early life ===
Judith Ann Rasmussen was born 30 March 1942 just outside Rexburg, Idaho, US, one of the three daughters of Barbara Porter Hegsted (1917–2008) and Richard Rasmussen (1918–2006). Her father joined the US Navy, and was later director of the National Civil Defense Staff College, as well as an active Mormon leader. Dushku grew up in multiple US locations, as a self-described "military brat," and completed high school in Michigan. She had two sisters, one of whom died in 1990.

Rasmussen pursued a Bachelor of Arts at Brigham Young University, where she joined the Young Republicans and planned a State Department career. She graduated with a BA in political science in 1964. With encouragement from her BYU teachers, she applied for and won a scholarship to the flagship M.A. in Law and Diplomacy at the international affairs graduate division of Tufts University, the Fletcher School of Law and Diplomacy, graduating in 1966.

=== Academic career ===
==== Move to Suffolk University ====
Rasmussen took a year off, then joined Suffolk University (Boston, Massachusetts), a private university with a large number of first-generation immigrants from Ireland, Italy and Greece, initially on a temporary basis. She stayed on, and in time secured tenure, ultimately teaching there for more than 45 years. On her tenure track, she secured administrative work in addition to her teaching and research duties, including managing student affairs and support for foreign students. She also accommodated foreign students, notably from Africa, and also China, at home.

==== Academic focus ====
Dushku's academic interests include comparative politics, especially in the context of the developing world and Global South; former Communist states in transition, including the end of the Yugoslav state; international law; and American government. She concentrated on how these and related events and economic shifts impact on the lives of women, and she has spoken and written on rural development and health, with specific reference to women. Teaching assignments ranged from introductions to and broad courses on US, African, Caribbean, Central American and developing world politics, the former USSR and its sphere of influence, women in global and regional politics and ethics in international affairs.

She took part in the third and fourth UN conferences on women, in Nairobi in 1985 and Beijing in 1995. She also led study trips to more than twenty countries, often in transitional situations, including Ukraine, Kazakhstan and Nicaragua.

Dushku has been voted Suffolk University Professor of the Year and received a Lifetime Contribution Award from the institution. She has been awarded a grant as a Fulbright Senior Specialist on the topic of "Politics of Post-Communist Transition."

=== Diversity and feminism ===
Dushku has explained how she became interested in questions of diversity and rights, referencing her upbringing; she has also commented that the Vietnam War changed her perspective. She joined some anti-war groups, and took an increasing interest in broader social issues, including those of women's rights, and the promotion of the Equal Rights Amendment. She has written on topics such as women's rights, domestic abuse, and treatment of women in the LDS Church.

=== Exponent II ===
In 1974, Dushku was one of the founders of Exponent II, a women's journal published by, and largely for, Mormon women, and inspired by the early Woman's Exponent published by members of the Relief Society from 1872 to 1914. Dushku featured on the masthead from the first issue and for many years she ran the Sisters Speak column, where readers could write in about personal issues. She remained involved with the magazine for decades, including two terms as president, as it addressed a wide range of issues, including feminism in general and in a Mormon context, marriage, reproductive rights, as well as anti-war movements and other concerns from a feminine perspective. The Exponent II group, including Dushku, also ran a series of classes on the role of women in the LDS Church. She also wrote a 40-year retrospective on the magazine and how it was organized.

=== Mitt Romney ===
Dushku was acquainted with Mitt Romney, who was for some years the bishop in her ward, and also for a time Boston stake president of the LDS Church. During his US presidential nomination campaign, Dushku spoke out about Romney's position on abortion, highlighting a case in which there was a risk to the life of the mother, in which he had intervened as an LDS bishop. She also highlighted his general attitude towards LDS women, and women in general, while stressing, in response to 'muck-raking' questions, that he was conscientious. After the election, Dushku's overtures to Ann Romney to restore family relations were rejected and when the Boston stake was divided, and a new Cambridge stake formed, her ward was not included in the area to which Romney's home was assigned, but to a more remote one, in a maneuver sometimes described as the "Dushku gerrymander."

=== Work in Africa ===
Suffolk University appointed Dushku as Dean of their Dakar, Senegal campus from 2001 to 2003. This campus, with students from 20 countries, had operated since the 1980s.

While in Dakar, Dushku met a number of surviving child soldiers, child brides and refugees from countries which had encountered severe disruption. After a study trip to Uganda in 2009 she founded, along with her husband and daughter, a charity in Gulu, in Northern Uganda, not far from the border with Sudan, which had been severely impacted by the Lord's Resistance Army. Initially Tharce-Gulu (Trauma Healing and Reflecting Center - Gulu), the non-governmental organization was later renamed Thrive-Gulu, and it works on rehabilitation, literacy for both adults and young people, and empowerment, rights and leadership training. It also helped build a women's bakery in the city, and some of its supporters sell craft goods from Gulu in the US. Dushku, whose project was backed by the Boston stake president, has also stated that she collaborates with the LDS Church in Gulu, and that the project was supported by "participants from the LDS network ... and ... others from various regions, religions and professions." The project has also received funding from international aid agencies of countries including Ireland and Norway, and NGOs such as Save the Children.

=== Personal life ===
Rasmussen married Philip Dushku, a Boston-area school teacher and administrator of first-generation Albanian heritage, in 1969. They had three sons, including Nate Dushku, and a daughter, the youngest child, actress Eliza Dushku. They divorced during the 1980 pregnancy, but he was involved with the family growing up. Philip died in 2018.

She remarried, to Jim Coleman, in 1991, and they continued to live in Watertown, Massachusetts. Coleman, with four children also, and a non-Mormon, nonetheless joined her local LDS ward. They both worked for Suffolk University, including in Dakar. Retiring from the role of assistant director of the Library, Coleman continued to work with the Gulu NGO. He died in Watertown, October 31, 2013.

Dushku is a practicing Mormon and has been president of the Relief Society, the principal Mormon women's organization, for the Boston stake. She has also been involved in community activities, day care and women's issues.

== Publication ==
- Multiple items in Exponent II
- Essay in Mormon Women Speak: A Collection of Essays (1982)
- Essay in Mormon Sisters: Women in Early Utah
- Essay in Sister Saints
- Short story in Fiction on the Web

== Recognition ==
In 2010 Dushku was awarded the Eve Award by the Mormon Women's Forum.
