= Tim B. Heaton =

Tim B. Heaton (born December 1, 1949) is an American educator and sociologist. He has been called the leading expert on the demographics of Mormons.

Heaton holds the Camilla Kimball Chair in the Department of Sociology at Brigham Young University (BYU). He has done research in both the United States on trends and sources of divorce and in Latin America on how the family characteristic effects the health of children.

Heaton holds bachelor's and master's degrees from BYU and a Ph.D. from the University of Wisconsin–Madison. He did a postdoctoral fellowship at the University of North Carolina at Chapel Hill.

Heaton is the co-editor of Biodemography and Social Biology. Heaton also co-edited the Statistical Handbook of the Family with Bruce Chadwick. He co-authored with Marie Cornwall and Lawrence A. Young Contemporary Mormonism: Social Science Perspectives.

Heaton co-authored the article "Religious Influence on Marital Stability" with Vaughn R. A. Call. He wrote the article "The Effects of Religious Homogamy on Marital Satisfaction" with Edith D. Pratt. He has authored or co-authored many other articles for the Journal of Family Issues, Journal of Marriage and the Family.
