= 2009 Palanca Awards =

Philippine literary award

59th Palanca Awards
- Date: September 1, 2009
- Location: The Peninsula Manila, Makati, Philippines

The 59th Don Carlos Palanca Memorial Awards for Literature was held on September 1, 2009, at The Peninsula Manila in Makati to commemorate the memory of Don Carlos Palanca Sr. through an endeavor that would promote education and culture in the country. According to the Palanca Foundation, 62 percent of this year’s awardees were first time winners. National Artist for Literature Bienvenido Lumbera was Guest of Honor and Speaker at this year’s awarding ceremony. This year saw the inclusion of a new category, Poetry Written for Children/Tulang Pambata, in both the English and Filipino Divisions.

Reuel Molina Aguila and Eugene Evasco were this year's Palanca Hall of Fame awardees. Aguila clinched his fifth first prize for “Ngunit Wala Akong Litrato Noong Nasa Kolehiyo Ako” under the Sanaysay category. Evasco clinched his fifth first prize for “May Tiyanak Sa Loob Ng Aking Bag” under the Tulang Pambata category. The said award is given to writers who have won five first places in any category.

The 2009 winners are divided into four categories:

== English Division ==
=== Short Story ===
- First Prize: – Sigfredo R. Iñigo, "Home of the Sierra Madre"
- Second Prize: Anne Lagamayo, "Mr. & Mrs. Reyes and the Polka-dotted Sofa"
- Third Prize: Luis Joaquin Katigbak, "Dear Distance"

=== Short Story for Children ===
- First Prize: Kathleen Aton-Osias, "Apolinario and the Name Trader"
- Second Prize: Edgardo B. Maranan, "The Artist of the Cave"
- Third Prize: Paolo Gabriel V. Chikiamco, "Dear Mr. Supremo"

=== Poetry ===
- First Prize: Vincenz Serrano, "The Collapse of What Separates Us"
- Second Prize: Eliza A. Victoria, "Reportage"
- Third Prize: Mark Anthony R. Cayanan, "Placelessness: Poems from a Series"

=== Poetry Written for Children ===
- First Prize: Edgardo B. Maranan, "The Google Song & Other Rhymes for Children"
- Second Prize: Heidi Emily Eusebio Abad, "Child of Earth Poems"
- Third Prize: H. Francisco V. Penones Jr., "Turtle and Other Poems for children"

=== Essay ===
- First Prize: Edgardo B. Maranan, "A Passage Through the Storm"
- Second Prize: Erlinda Enriquez Panlilio, "Saying Goodbye to the House"
- Third Prize: Maria Teresa P. Garcia, "Sweet of the Earth"

=== One–Act Play ===
- First Prize: No Winner
- Second Prize: No Winner
- Third Prize: Violet B. Lucasi, "Balangao"

=== Full-Length Play ===
- First Prize: No Winner
- Second Prize: No Winner
- Third Prize: Floy Quintos, "Fake"

== Filipino Division ==
=== Maikling Kwento ===
- First Prize: No Winner
- Second Prize: Rogelio Braga, "MGA"
- Third Prize: Jimmuel C. Naval, "Ang Kamatayan ng Isang Linggo"

=== Maikling Kwentong Pambata ===
- First Prize: Genaro R. Gojo Cruz, "Mahabang-mahabang-mahaba"
- Second Prize: Michael M. Coroza, "Ang mga Kahon ni Kalon"
- Third Prize: Milagros B. Gonzales, "Ang Nanay Kong Lola"

=== Tula ===
- First Prize: Reagan R. Maiquez, "Ilang Sandali Makalipas ang Huling Araw ng Mundo"
- Second Prize: Alwynn C. Javier, "Yaong Pakpak na Binunot sa Akin"
- Third Prize: Charles B. Tuvilla, "Sambutil na Daigdig sa Ilalim ng Pilik"

=== Tulang Pambata ===
- First Prize: Eugene Evasco, "May Tiyanak sa Loob ng Aking Bag"
- Second Prize: Jesus M. Santiago, "Kuwentong Matanda, Bersong Bata"
- Third Prize: Michael M. Coroza, "Munting Daigdig ng Dalit at Awit"

=== Sanaysay ===
- First Prize: Reuel Molina Aguila, "Ngunit Wala Akong Litrato Noong Nasa Kolehiyo Ako"
- Second Prize: Jing Panganiban-Mendoza, "Kumander"
- Third Prize: Jahanie Sultan, "Kamay"

=== Dulang May Isang Yugto ===
- First Prize: Layeta P. Bucoy, "Doc Resurreccion: Gagamutin ang Bayan"
- Second Prize: Liza C. Magtoto, "Paigan"
- Third Prize: Jose Dennis C. Teodosio, "Asunto"

=== Dulang Ganap ang Haba ===
- First Prize: Rodolfo C. Vera, "Ismail at Isabel"
- Second Prize: Reuel Molina Aguila, "Sa Kanto ng Wakas at Katotohanan Ext."
- Third Prize: Sir Anril P. Tiatco, "Miss Dulce Extranjera"

=== Dulang Pampelikula ===
- First Prize: Seymour Barros Sanchez and Christian M. Lacuesta, "Hiwaga"
- Second Prize: Jerry B. Gracio, "Muli"
- Third Prize: Enrique Ramos, "Moonlight Over Baler"

== Regional Division ==
=== Short Story [Cebuano] ===
- First Prize: Corazon M. Almerino, "Sugmat"
- Second Prize: Richel G. Dorotan, "Biyahe"
- Third Prize: Ferdinand L. Balino, "Mga Mananap sa Kagabhion"

=== Short Story [Hiligaynon] ===
- First Prize: Ferdinand L. Balino, "Kanamit Gid Sang Arroz Valenciana"
- Second Prize: Alice Tan Gonzales, "Baha"
- Third Prize: Joselito Vladimir D. Perez, "Ang Santo Intiero"

=== Short Story [Iluko] ===
- First Prize: Danilo B. Antalan, "Vigan"
- Second Prize: Ariel S. Tabag, "Dagiti Ayup Iti Bantay Quimmallugong"
- Third Prize: Reynaldo A. Duque, "Ti Kararua Ni Roman Catolico, Mannaniw, Nga Immulog Iti Impierno"

== Kabataan Division ==
=== Kabataan Essay ===
- First Prize: Cristina Gratia T. Tantengco, "The Benefits of Selflessness"
- Second Prize: Vincen Gregory Y. Yu, "Dreams and Pastures"
- Third Prize: Angelita A. Bombarda, "On Being Filipino: A Citizen to the World"

=== Kabataan Sanaysay ===
- First Prize: Axcel L. Trinidad, "Si Ate Elsa, Si Aling Carmen, at Ako Laban sa mga Nangungunang Bansa sa Mundo"
- Second Prize: Johanna Rose E. Calisin, "Nagkakaisang Isip, Damdamin at Lakas"
- Third Prize: Maya Victoria S. Rojas, "Humabol Ka, Pilipino!"
