= The Girl Who Could Move Shit with Her Mind =

2019 South African sci-fi novel

First edition

The Girl Who Could Move Shit with Her Mind (stylized as The Girl Who Could Move Sh*t with Her Mind) is a 2019 science fiction novel by South African author Rob Boffard, under the pseudonym "Jackson Ford". It was first published by Orbit Books.

== Synopsis ==
Teagan Frost is a psychokinetic, forced to work for the United States government. When a body is found, killed in a way that seemingly only Teagan could be responsible for, she must find the real culprit, or face a life as an experimental subject.

== Reception ==
Kirkus Reviews praised it as "fast-paced" and "high-adrenaline", with Teagan being "frank and funny". Publishers Weekly similarly lauded the "taut action sequences and suspenseful pacing", but faulted the characters as "flimsy" and "frustratingly limited", and noted that the "romantic subplots are underwhelming".

== Adaptation ==
In 2020, Deadline Hollywood announced that Alex Kurtzman was preparing a TV adaptation of the novel.
