= Nadine Hansen =

American lawyer

Nadine Hansen is an American lawyer from Cedar City, Utah notable for founding the website Mormonsfor8.com.

During the Church of Jesus Christ of Latter-day Saint political advocacy campaign for the Proposition 8 campaign in California, Hansen used publicly available data on individual political donors to create a website focusing on what she saw as inconsistencies between political advocacy and the tax-exempt status of the church.

The Associated Press reported in 2009 that "...Hansen sought to identify Mormon donors of $1,000 or more, matching campaign records to tips from site visitors and church members and what she and others uncovered with search engines." Individual donors to political causes in the United States are not normally segregated according to religious preferences when donating to political campaigns.

Theologically and doctrinally outside the mainstream of Mormon thought, Hansen has previously been notable for advocating for the ordination of women to the priesthood in the Mormon faith.
