= Ordain Women =

Mormon feminist organization

Ordain Women is a Mormon feminist organization that supports the ordination of women to the priesthood in the Church of Jesus Christ of Latter-day Saints (LDS Church). It was founded on March 17, 2013, by Kate Kelly, a human rights attorney from Washington, D.C., with the website launch containing 19 profiles of individuals calling for the ordination of Mormon women. As of May 17, 2014, the website featured more than 400 profiles.

In April 2026, the blog Times and Seasons wrote a retrospective piece, implying the movement is defunct or mostly so, although the website remains available as of the same time.

== Actions ==
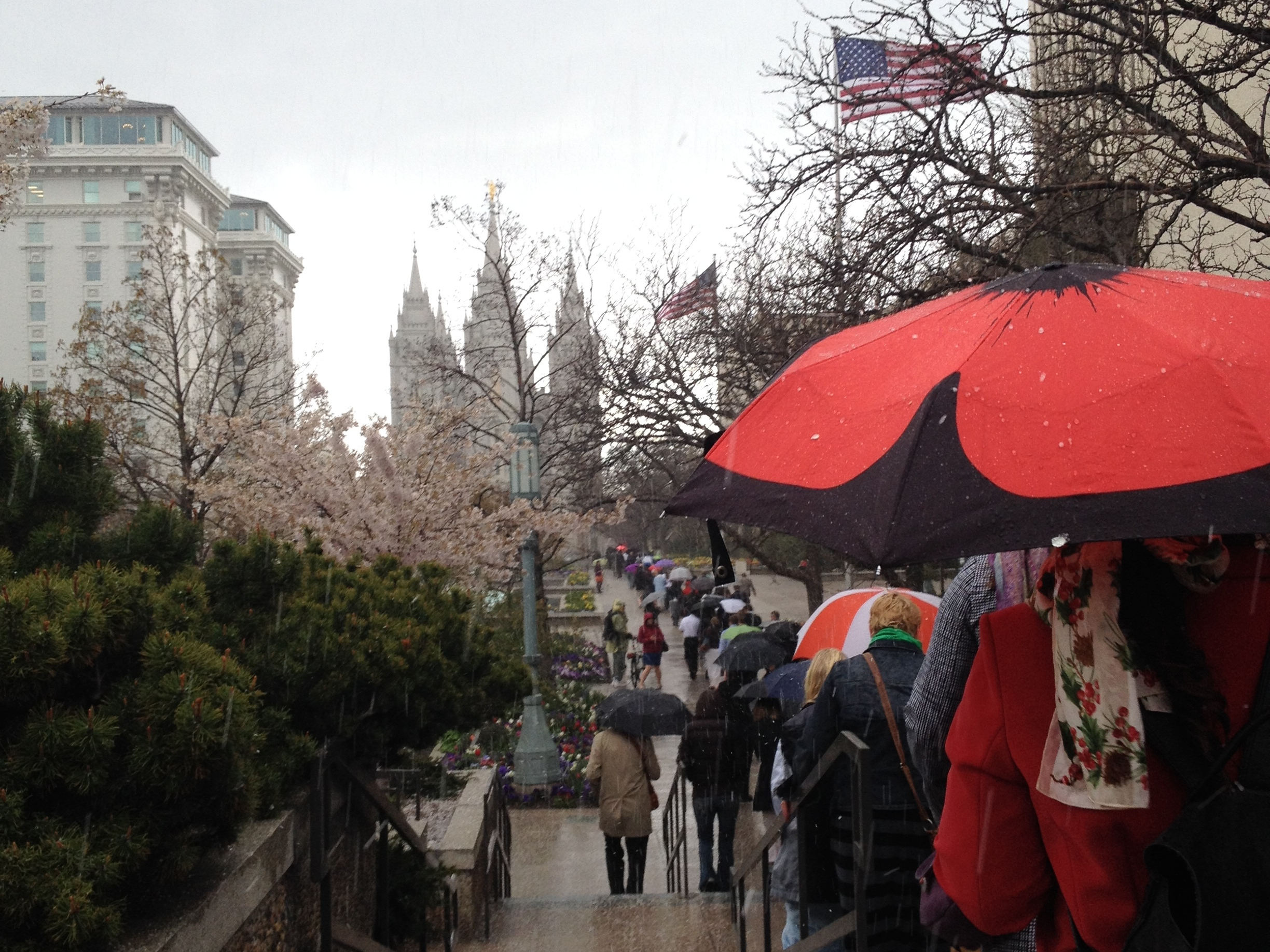
Ordain Women's April 2014 Priesthood Action

On April 6, 2013, at the University of Utah in Salt Lake City, Ordain Women held its first public meeting, concurrent with the priesthood session of the LDS Church's general conference.

On August 26, 2013, Ordain Women collaborated in the organization and execution of an interfaith fast called "Equal in Faith: Women Fast for Gender Justice." This event took place in both Washington, D.C., and Salt Lake City, and saw participation from a range of faiths including sects of Protestant Christianity, Catholicism, Islam, Judaism, and Buddhism. Mormon women represented half the participants.

The group requested tickets to the priesthood session of the October 2013 general conference. The request was denied in a response from Ruth Todd, spokeswoman for the LDS Church. On October 5, 2013, Ordain Women organized an event in which approximately 150 Latter-day Saint women and men attempted to attend the priesthood session of the LDS Church's semiannual general conference in the stand-by line, held in the LDS Conference Center and Tabernacle in Salt Lake City, Utah. The women were told at the door that the session was for men only and that they would not be admitted. Later that year, church headquarters sent a letter to local church leaders, stating that if women asked to be admitted to attend a general conference priesthood session in a stake center, the male leaders were "to inform them that the meeting is for men and that men are invited to attend", but since the church's meetinghouses "should be places of peace, not contention," if women "become insistent" about entering the priesthood session "to the point that their presence would be disruptive, please allow them to enter and view the conference."

On February 28, 2014, the group requested 250 tickets to attend the church's priesthood session on April 5, 2014. On March 17, 2014, church representatives denied the request and asked Ordain Women supporters not to protest during General Conference, directing the group to stand in the free speech zone at Temple Square if they chose to follow through with any demonstration. On April 5, members of the group, most of whom were church members, staged a demonstration, the culmination of which took place outside the Tabernacle. They were again denied entrance to the priesthood session.

Another Ordain Women action, titled the Six Discussions, debuted May 22, 2014. Originally, the Discussions were meant to be released on a weekly basis over a period of six weeks, however, Kate Kelly's excommunication delayed the final discussion's release. The aim of this action was to promote discussion about gender inequity within the church and the possibility of female ordination. Each discussion (titled: See the Symptoms, Know the History, Study the Scriptures, Revel in Revelation, Visualize Our Potential, and Be the Change) focuses on a different topic and provides a packet filled with essays, scriptural references, and General Conference talks, as well as prompts and questions to be discussed in a book club like setting.

In October 2014, members of Ordain Women joined men at church meetinghouses to watch a live broadcast of the priesthood session. Specifically, women were able to watch the broadcast of the priesthood session in Logan, Utah; Ogden, Utah; Provo, Utah; San Francisco, California; Los Angeles, California; Dallas, Texas; Tempe, Arizona; Lakewood, Colorado; Medford, Oregon; and the Washington, D.C., area.

In 2015, Ordain Women created fictional photo illustrations of Mormon women healing the sick through blessings, to help women imagine what it would look like if they were ordained to the priesthood.

== LDS Church reaction ==
On May 5, 2014, Kelly was placed on informal probation by her local LDS Church leaders for "openly, repeatedly and deliberately acting in public opposition to the church and its leaders after having been counseled not to do so." She then received an email on June 8 threatening her with disfellowshipment or excommunication for apostasy. Kelly's disciplinary council was scheduled for June 22; on June 23, she was informed by her bishop that she had been excommunicated in absentia. Kelly's bishop, Mark Harrison, stated that the Six Discussions "intended to proselyte others and persuade them to support your [Kelly's] particular interpretation of church doctrine." As such, these packets represent part of the basis for Kelly's excommunication on the grounds of "conduct unbecoming of a member of the church" and her "aggressive effort to persuade other Church members to [her] point of view..."

The LDS Church has not publicly issued any direction to formally or informally discipline Ordain Women profile holders. When church spokesman, Cody Craynor was asked if profile holders should be worried about their temple recommend status due to involvement with Ordain Women, he stated that "qualifying for a temple recommend is a matter between members and local leaders." Despite the lack of coordination from Church Headquarters, it is confirmed that men and women have lost church callings and temple recommends directly because of association with Ordain Women.

== Demand for ordination ==
In October 2013, Pew Research released the poll results of a 2011 survey that suggests a large majority of Latter-day Saints—including 90 percent of Latter-day Saint women—disagree that women in the LDS Church should be ordained to the priesthood. While these results have been widely cited, the survey itself has been described as "problematic" by some. The relevancy of the results have been questioned based on the fact that the survey question, "Should women who are dedicated members of the LDS Church be ordained to the priesthood?," is an either/or proposition, whereas a spectrum of views on female ordination exists within the LDS faith. Additionally, it has been suggested that these results are quickly becoming outdated as a result of the increased discussion of female ordination.

== See also ==
- Mormonism and women
- Sonia Johnson
