= Marie Cornwall =

American sociologist

Marie Cornwall (born 1949) is the editor of the Journal for the Scientific Study of Religion, a professor of sociology and women's studies at Brigham Young University (BYU) and a former director of BYU's Women's Research Institute.

== Biography ==
Cornwall holds a bachelor's degree in English from the University of Utah, a master's degree in sociology from BYU and a Ph.D. in sociology from the University of Minnesota.

=== Career ===
Besides being a member of the BYU faculty Cornwall was also a visiting professor at the University of Utah for one year. She was a researcher for the LDS Church's Correlation Department prior to joining the BYU faculty, where she studied causes/patterns of Mormons leaving church activity for other ways of living.

Cornwall was one of the moving figures behind the growth of the Mormon Social Science Association.

== Publications ==
Among other subjects Cornwall has written articles on women's suffrage, unemployment, gender roles in housekeeping, plural marriage and religion and family in such journals as Mobilization; Social Forces; Journal of Marriage and the Family and Review of Religious Research. Among other books, Cornwall edited Contemporary Mormonism: Social Science Perspectives, with Tim B. Heaton and Lawrence A. Young. Along with Sherrie Mills Johnson, Cornwall has done studies critical of the view that Mormon women are submissive and degraded.

== Sources ==
- BYU faculty bio of Cornwall
- Cornwall's vita
- University of Illinois Press blurb on Cornwall
- Barnes and Noble listing of books by Cornwall
- abstract of Cornwall's "From the Editor" piece in an issue of the Journal for the Scientific Study of Religion
- info on Cornwall
- "A Farewell Salute to the Women's Research Institute of Brigham Young University" in SquareTwo, Vol. 2 No. 3 (Fall 2009)
