= Maureen U. Beecher =

Canadian LDS historian (1935–2025)

Maureen Ursenbach Beecher (March 19, 1935 – November 18, 2025) was a Canadian historian and editor of the history of the Church of Jesus Christ of Latter-day Saints (LDS Church). She studied at Brigham Young University (BYU) and the University of Utah. She worked in the History Department for the LDS Church from 1972 to 1980, and became a professor of English at BYU in 1981 while continuing her work in Mormon history at the Joseph Fielding Smith Institute for Church History. She published a book of Eliza R. Snow's writings.

== Early life and education ==
Maureen Ursenbach was born on March 19, 1935, in Calgary, Alberta, the youngest of four children born to Charles and Margaret Lucille (née Harvey) Ursenbach. She attended Sunalta School in Calgary, followed by studies at University of Alberta, Calgary and Edmonton branches to finish her secondary education.

She studied at BYU majoring in mathematics and English and graduating in 1958. She served as a missionary for the LDS Church later in 1958 in the Swiss-Austrian mission. After returning from her mission, she studied at the University of Utah, receiving her master's in English in 1966 and her PhD in comparative literature in 1973.

== As a historian ==
Prior to her research on Mormon studies, Beecher (her married name) served as the managing editor of the Western Humanities Review.

Beecher was an editor and senior research associate in the History Department for the LDS Church from 1972 to 1980. She was the founding president of the Association for Mormon Letters in 1976.

In 1981, she took a position as an English professor at BYU while also a research professor in the Joseph Fielding Smith Institute for Church History. Beecher retired from BYU in 1997.

She was the general editor for the Life Writings of Frontier Women series and published two books on Eliza R. Snow, including a definitive edition of Snow's writings, The Personal Writings of Eliza Roxcy Snow. The book won two awards and was popular, selling out of its first printing.

Beecher was a leading advocate for women's studies through her research on Snow and other Mormon women and Beecher served on the editorial board for Dialogue: A Journal of Mormon Thought. She wrote, edited, and promoted Global Forum projects in Ottawa, Canada.

== Personal life and death ==
Beecher married Dale Beecher. They later divorced. She retired and lived in Ottawa, Ontario, Canada. She later married Clifford (Cliff) Parfett. Beecher died on November 18, 2025, at the age of 90. She had cancer, and died with medical assistance.

== Awards ==
- 1992 Best Biography Award, Mormon History Association
- 1994 Leonard J. Arrington Award, Mormon History Association
- 1995 AML Award for biography, for The Personal Writings of Eliza Roxcy Snow
- 1996 Best Book Award, Mormon History Association
- 1996 BYU Women's Research Institute Best Article Award

== Sources ==
- Review of Beecher's papers of Eliza R. Snow that mentions some biographical details
