= Woman's Exponent =

Latter-Day Saint journal (1872–1914)

Woman's Exponent (1872 to 1914)
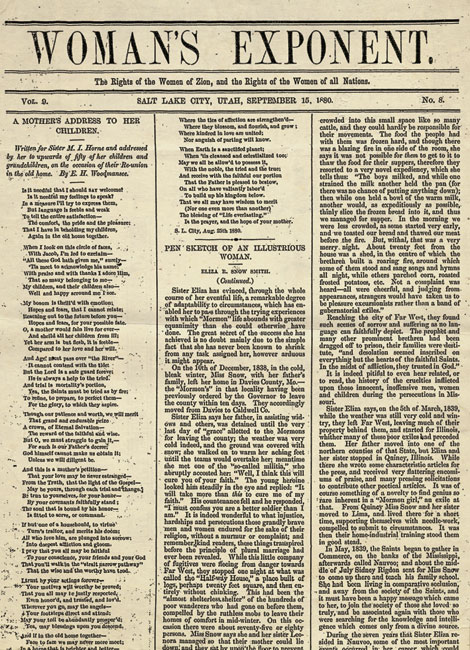
- September 15, 1880 issue
- Type: Periodical
- Editor: Louisa Lula Greene (1872–1877); Emmeline B. Wells (1877–1914)
- Associate editor: Annie Wells Cannon (1905–1914)
- Founded: 1872
- Ceased publication: 1914
- Language: English
- Headquarters: Salt Lake City

The Woman's Exponent was a semi-official publication of the Church of Jesus Christ of Latter-day Saints that began in 1872. It published articles advocating for women's suffrage and plural marriage, in addition to poetry and other writings. Lula Greene Richards and Emmeline B. Wells were its editors until 1914, when the Exponent was dissolved. It was "the first long-lived feminist periodical in the western United States." While it had no direct successor, the Relief Society did launch its own magazine, the Relief Society Magazine, in 1915.

A new publication, independent of the church but partially inspired by the earlier magazine, was launched by a women's group in Massachusetts in 1974, entitled Exponent II, and continues to the present day, along with a program of annual retreats, and latterly a semi-autonomous blog site, The Exponent.

== Goals and approach ==
The Woman's Exponent (A Utah Ladies' Journal) was a periodical published from 1872 until 1914 in Salt Lake City with the stated aims of defending and inculcating right principles, and sharing useful knowledge, and to "discuss every subject interesting and valuable to women." Its goals have been summarized by later commentators as uplifting and strengthening women of the Church of Jesus Christ of Latter-day Saints (LDS Church) and educating those not of the faith about the women of the Church. The prospectus of The Woman's Exponent cited grievances with the portrayal of Utah women in the press as a reason for the paper's creation, asserting: "Who are so well able to speak for the women of Utah as the women of Utah themselves? 'It is better to represent ourselves than to be misrepresented by others!'"

When first adopting a slogan under its nameplate in 1879, the Exponent chose a verse from Proverbs 25: "A Word fitly Spoken is like Apples of Gold in Pictures of Silver." Within a few months, however, the biblical quotes were replaced by a more political statement: "The Rights of the Women of Zion, and the Rights of the Women of All Nations." Its pro-suffrage position was never in doubt, but after women had the franchise restored with Utah statehood, in 1897 the slogan became a thesis: "The Ballot in the Hands of the Women of Utah should be a Power to better the Home, the State and the Nation."

Though not an official LDS Church publication, the Exponent was owned, operated and edited by LDS Church members in a private capacity. The periodical was closely tied to the Church's women's organizations, the Female Relief Societies, unified as the Relief Society. It was approved by the General Authorities of the Church, and often published news of Church events and essays relating to doctrine, but was editorially independent.

Throughout the time of its publication, the newspaper, as it was generally described, covered many topics and featured conflicting points of view. It was a strong voice in support of woman's suffrage. It also actively supported plural marriage, which was a religious practice of the Church at the time. Home, family, and the overall role of women were also frequent topics. The Exponent both expressed that the "woman's sphere" in the home was a noble construct of society and encouraged women to expand beyond it; education for women was often urged to the audience. Lucinda Lee Dalton, an early Mormon feminist, was a frequent contributor. The Exponent also published excerpts from Elizabeth Cady Stanton's The Woman's Bible and passages on the Mormon doctrine of Heavenly Mother. In addition to these religious, social, and political topics, the Exponent included poems and stories, tidbits of humor or wisdom, and current news. Recipes and other housekeeping tips and notes on dress were also published. To promote a more financially-independent Utah, the Exponent "constantly exhorted women to consume only locally made products." Reports from meetings of Relief Society bodies and other auxiliary organizations, such as young women’s and primary groups, were often included. Though it was a private publication, women of the Relief Society were actively encouraged to subscribe, as well as contribute to the paper.

== Format and circulation ==
The newspaper was generally issued semi-monthly at first and later monthly, on quarto paper in three columns. Each edition was eight pages long. The Exponent was described as "well filled with reading matter." Its circulation was estimated by the Pacific States Newspaper Directory to be 4,000 in 1888, and its readership likely exceeded that number; the Exponent was used in women's meetings and exchanged with papers outside of Utah. It was credited with considerable influence in Utah, and was quoted in other journals. The back page of the newspaper was reserved for advertisements, which included ads from the President of the Church encouraging women to open bank accounts. Other ads were for clothing, silkworms, and classes in midwifery.

== History ==
The editor of the Salt Lake Herald, Edward L. Sloan, originally intended to create a woman's column in the Herald itself. When the staff refused to support his idea, and having heard of the idea of a journal for women circulating in the Relief Society, Sloan decided to start the Exponent as a separate publication. He recruited Louisa Lula Greene as editor, and she accepted the position after she secured the approval of her great-uncle, Brigham Young, the president of the LDS Church, who assigned it to her as a mission. Greene moved to Salt Lake City in April 1872, and originally worked from a room in the house of another great-uncle, but later moved to a purpose-built office with living quarters. The first issue was published on June 1, 1872.

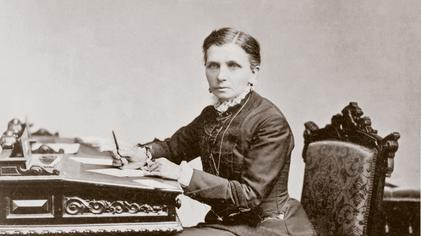
Emmeline B. Wells, second editor of the Woman's Exponent

Emmeline B. Wells, who would later become general president of the Relief Society, joined Greene as co-editor in the 1 December 1875 issue. They are both listed as editors on page 100 of vol. 4 no. 13; The two worked together to edit the magazine until Greene decided to take some time for her family in July 1877. She is last listed as editor on page 28 of vol. 6 no. 4; Wells was later joined by her daughter, Annie Wells Cannon, as associate editor, in June 1905. Her name first appears on page 4 of vol. 34 no. 1. Both continued to serve as the publication's editors until it folded.

The periodical faced increasing financial pressures from the late 1800s or early 1900s, and Wells unsuccessfully lobbied the Relief Society General Board to adopt the newspaper as its official publication. The paper was forced to close in February 1914. That month, The Salt Lake Tribune recorded that the Exponent was "to give way to what is hoped to be a larger and more modern [publication], but as yet nothing has been done." The Relief Society Magazine, a separate magazine and an official publication of the LDS Church, began in January 1915.

== Exponent II ==
Described by its production team as a "spiritual descendant" of the Woman's Exponent, a new independent publication, Exponent II, was launched by a women's group in the Cambridge area of Massachusetts in 1974. A quarterly periodical, it is now the longest-running independent publication for Latter-day Saint women.

== See also ==
- List of Latter Day Saint periodicals
