= Harvest: Contemporary Mormon Poems =

Harvest: Contemporary Mormon Poems (Signature Books, 1989), edited by Eugene England and Dennis Clark, was the first attempt at a comprehensive collection of Mormon poets and poetry.

== Included poets ==
- Paul L. Anderson
- Kathryn R. Ashworth
- Danielle Beazer
- Elouise Bell
- Mary Blanchard
- Mary Lythgoe Bradford
- Marilyn McMeen Miller Brown
- Robert A. Christmas
- Dennis Clark
- Marden J. Clark
- Iris Parker Corry
- Karen Lynn Davidson
- John Davies
- Colin B. Douglas
- Eugene England
- Kathy Evans
- Brewster Ghiselin
- Stephen Gould
- Steven William Graves
- Randall L. Hall
- Laura Hamblin
- John Sterling Harris
- Edward L. Hart
- Lewis Horne
- Donnell Hunter
- Clifton Holt Jolley
- Susan Elizabeth Howe
- Bruce W. Jorgensen
- Randall L. Hall
- Patricia Gunter Karamesines
- Arthur Henry King
- Karl Keller
- Lance Larsen
- Clinton F. Larson
- Timothy Liu
- Rob Hollis Miller
- Karen Marguerite Moloney
- Margaret R. Munk
- Reid Nibley
- Veneta Leatham Nielsen
- Leslie Norris
- M. D. Palmer
- Dixie Lee Partridge
- Carol Lynn Pearson
- Vernice Wineera Pere
- Robert A. Rees
- Karl C. Sandberg
- John W. Schouten
- Linda Sillitoe
- Loretta Randall Sharp
- William Stafford
- Helen Candland Stark
- May Swenson
- Anita Tanner
- Sally T. Taylor
- Stephen Orson Taylor
- Emma Lou Thayne
- Richard Ellis Tice
- P. Karen Todd
- Philip White
- Ronald Wilcox
- David L. Wright

== See also ==
- Mormon poetry
- Fire in the Pasture: 21st Century Mormon Poets
