= Mormon poetry =

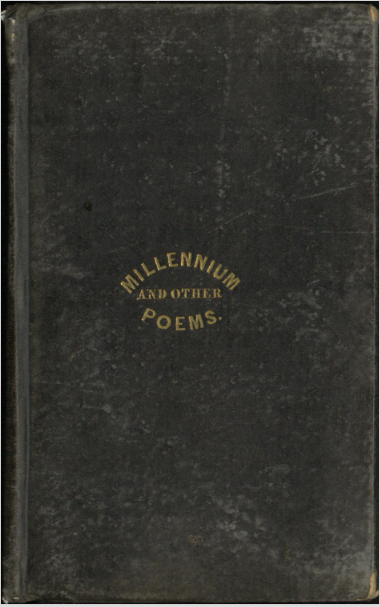
Parley P. Pratt's volume of original poetry, published in 1840.

Mormon poetry (or Latter Day Saint poetry) is poetry written by members of the Church of Jesus Christ of Latter-day Saints (LDS Church) about spiritual topics or themes. Mormons have a long history of writing poetry relevant to their religious beliefs and to the Mormon experience. Mormon poetry, like Mormon fiction, has experienced different periods throughout the LDS Church's history, including the "home literature" period and the "lost generation." Some Mormon poetry became church hymns.

== History ==
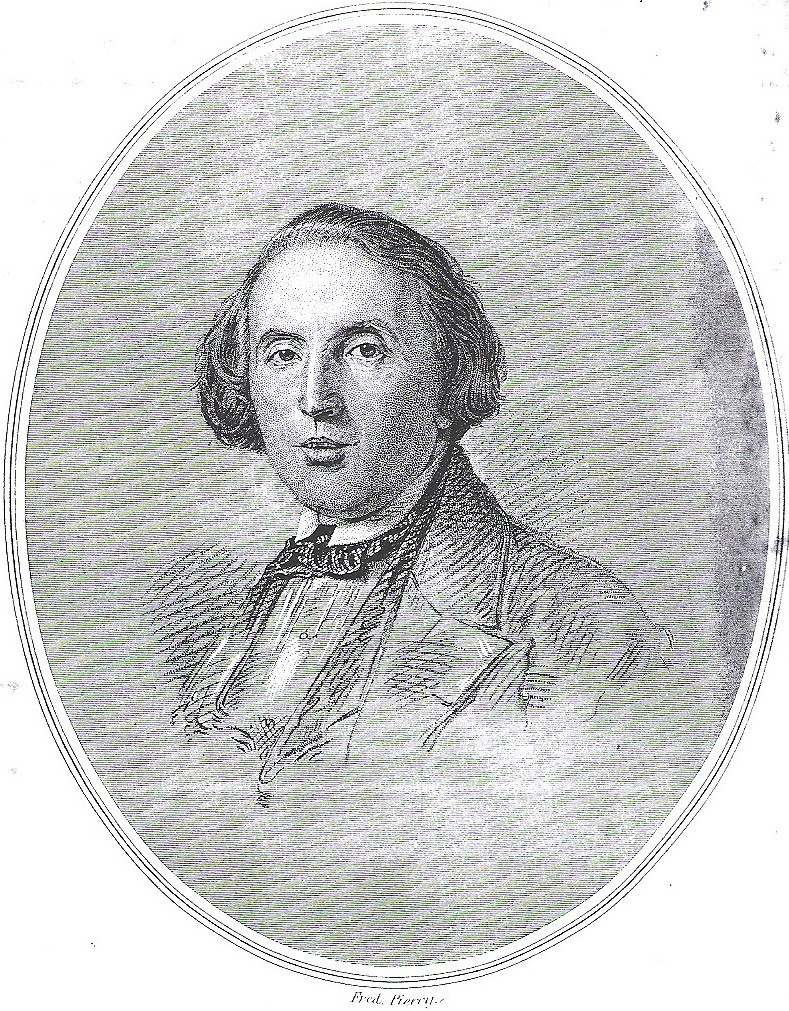
Scotsman John Lyon, was one of the first notable LDS poets.

Mormons have composed religious poetry since the church's beginnings in the early 19th century. Poetry was often featured in LDS newspapers. Church tithing funds aided the publication of the first LDS book of poetry. The first volume of Mormon poetry ever published was Parley P. Pratt's The Millenium and Other Poems. Franklin Richards was president of the European Mission and said that when "faithful Saints" prayerfully study religious poetry, "the heart is purified," the soul inspired, and good judgement bred. For example, the Elder's Journal, published at Far West in 1838 and edited by Joseph and Don Carlos Smith, contained a beautiful poetic tribute to James G. Marsh. Poetry was often used in hymns in the foundation period of LDS Literature (1830–1880). Notable poets include Eliza R. Snow, Parley P. Pratt, W. W. Phelps, and John Lyon, who wrote The Harp of Zion: A Collection of Poems, Etc. (1853). Joseph Smith's son, David Hyrum Smith, a member of the RLDS Church, inherited his father's gift with words and wrote poetry for the Herald.

=== Home literature period ===
During the "home literature" movement period (1880–1930), a number of poets published or disseminated their works. Poets Josephine Spencer and Augusta Joyce Crocheron wrote poems; some were didactic, and others had realism or narrative as goals.^{:465–468} Southern Utahn Charles Walker wrote poems and hymns which became popular, and Orson F. Whitney penned songs, lyric poetry, and a book-length epic poem, Elias: An Epic of the Ages (1904).^{:465–467} Whitney was an advocate of the home literature movement, which encouraged both published works and personal efforts to create "faith-promoting" verses. In the 1930s, Church magazines including the Improvement Era and the Relief Society Magazine published hundreds of poems submitted by readers. Early Mormon poetry tended to attack the secular world and defend its own community.

=== The lost generation and academic poetry ===
The next generation of Mormon poets, educated and modern, attacked faults in Mormon culture. The generation was considered "lost" because the critical works were largely rejected by Mormons themselves despite the praise they received from the rest of the poetry community.

Another shift in Mormon poetry occurred in the 1960s, starting with Clinton F. Larson's poetry. Larson managed to depart both from the "didactic and inward-looking provinciality" of early poetry and the "elitist, patronizing provinciality" of his contemporaries in the lost generation (1930–1970). In the 1950s, he started writing modernist poetry that drew on his Mormon faith. In his review of Larson's poetry collection, Karl Keller wrote that Lason's poetry showed "religion succeeding in an esthetic way." The development of this new movement was aided by the development of the first Mormon academic and literary periodicals, including BYU Studies (1959) and Dialogue (1966). Larson founded BYU Studies in 1959, and contributed poetry there and to Dialogue. After this development, many of the Mormon poets who emerged were academically trained. Knowledgeable of trends in literature, these poets were more like their peers in mainstream American poetry than their predecessors in Mormon poetry.

=== Contemporary poetry ===
More recently, poetry has been seen in general conference sermons given by Latter-day Saint apostles. For example, in 1972, as part of his address, Bruce R. McConkie read his poem, "I Believe In Christ," which later became a church hymn. In 1997, Boyd K. Packer shared his faith about the cleansing power of Jesus in his poem "Washed Clean" as part of his April conference sermon. While those examples are of personally composed pieces, poetry from other authors is also quoted in general conference messages. David O. McKay, 9th president of the church, referenced hundreds of poems throughout his addresses.^{:6–7} Thomas S. Monson, the 16th church president, was an avid lover of poetry and often quoted poems in his own sermons.

In Bert Fuller's review article, Mormon Poetry, 2012 to the Present (2018), he summarized the works of the most prominent Mormon poets. He specifically mentioned the works of Kimberly Johnson, calling her poems in Uncommon Prayer "a well-crafted triptych of reverent irreverence that answers in verse the rising tide of postsecularism." Johnson has also made translations for Hesiod's Theogony and Works of Days, which Fuller assesses as the "most readable English version available." Fuller praises Kristen's Eliason's poetry in Picture Dictionary, a collection in the form of a bilingual dictionary. Fuller further mentions John Talbot's witty Rough Translation, Lance Larson's "eminently readable" Genius Loci, and Susan Elizabeth Howe's Salt.

The Association for Mormon Letters has given awards for poetry nearly every year since 1977 as part of the AML Awards.

== Religious significance ==
For Mormons, poetry is a form of art that can bring the Holy Spirit to the presented message. Early Mormon poets wrote about topics essential to their religious beliefs, such as prophets, revelations, and temples, and considered hymns and poetry an essential part of their worship. Important themes in contemporary Mormon poetry include one's ancestry, Church doctrine, and the Mormon experience. The LDS Church has officially encouraged its members to write hymns and poems on multiple occasions. In Mormon scripture, God emphasizes the importance of song and verse: "my soul delighteth in the song of the heart; yea, the song of the righteous is a prayer unto me." Latter-Day Saints also value identifying and understanding poetry in the Old Testament and the Book of Mormon.

Poetry is also considered helpful to Mormon efforts to preach the gospel.

In the late nineteenth century, a subgenre of "death poetry" was prevalent among Mormon women poets. Death poetry allowed these poets to express their feelings, find consolation in doctrine, and seek comfort in sorority since death was prevalent in early Utah life. Much of this poetry was published in the Woman's Exponent.

The Songs of Zion is a collection of hymns sung by The Church of Jesus Christ. These songs are believed to be received by revelation from God, rather than actually written by Mormons.

== Notable Mormon poets ==
- Neil Aitken
- Joanna Brooks
- Alex Caldiero
- Michael Robert Collings
- Ina Coolbrith
- Eugene England
- Susan Elizabeth Howe
- Rachel Hunt Steenblik
- Lance Larsen
- Clinton F. Larson
- John Lyon
- George Manwaring
- Dayna Patterson
- Carol Lynn Pearson
- William W. Phelps
- Parley P. Pratt
- Linda Sillitoe
- David Hyrum Smith
- Eliza R. Snow
- Kathryn Knight Sonntag
- Virginia Sorensen
- Josephine Spencer
- Rachel Hunt Steenblik
- Emma Lou Thayne
- Orson F. Whitney
- Vernice Wineera

== Notable collections ==
- Harvest: Contemporary Mormon Poems (1989), edited by Eugene England and Dennis Clark

== See also ==
- Mormon fiction
- Mormon literature
- Hymns in The Church of Jesus Christ of Latter-Day Saints
- Culture of The Church of Jesus Christ of Latter-Day Saints
