= Michael Austin (writer) =

Academic and critic of Mormon literature (born 1966)

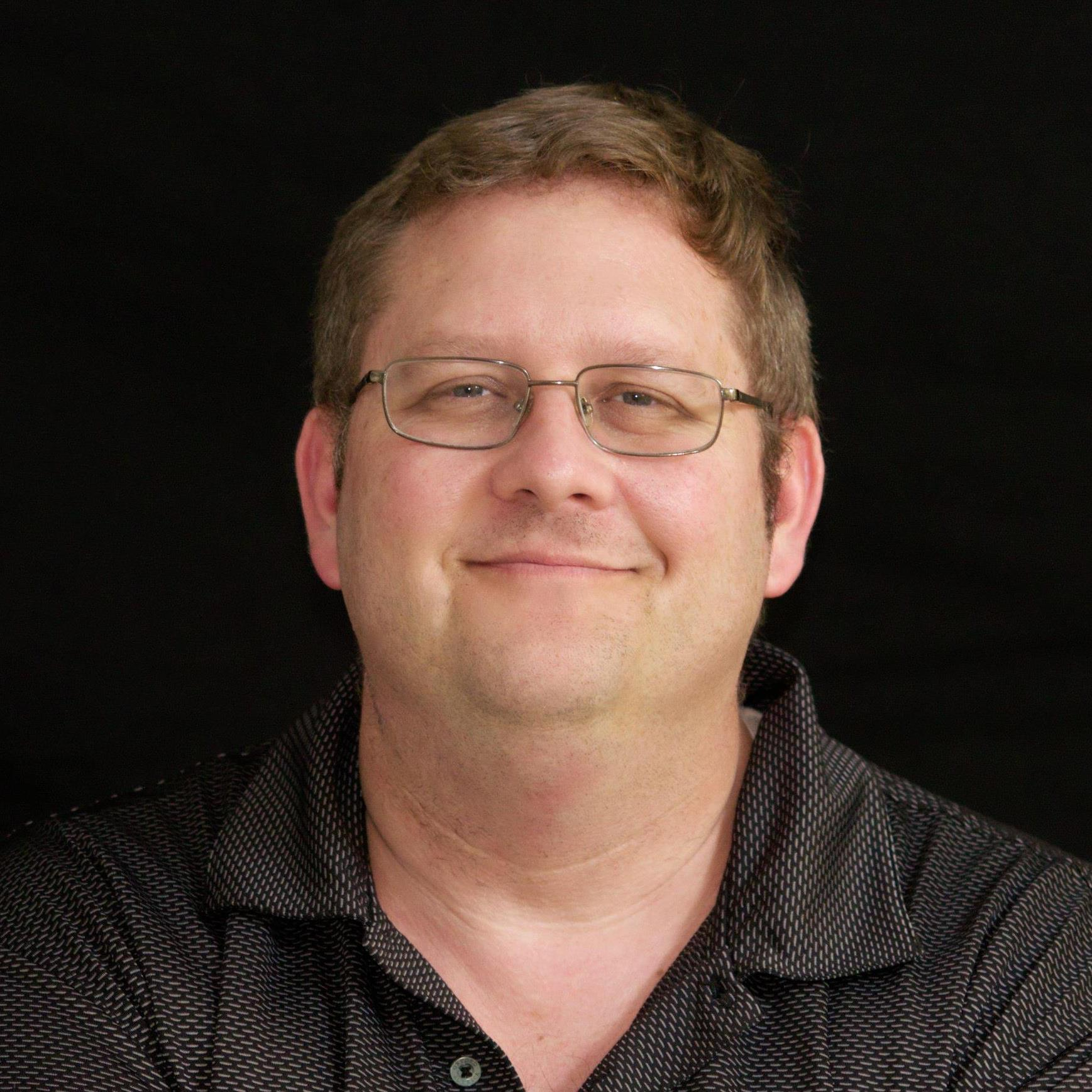
- Austin in 2013
- Born: 1966 (age 59–60)
- Education: Brigham Young University; University of California, Santa Barbara
- Occupation: Provost at Snow College
- Writing career
- Language: English
- Notable works: Reading the World: Ideas that Matter; That's Not What They Meant! Reclaiming the Founding Fathers from America's Right Wing; Re-Reading Job: Understanding the Ancient World's Greatest Poem
- Notable awards: AML Lifetime Achievement Award
- Website: founderstein.blogspot.com

Michael Austin (born 1966) is an American academic, university administrator, author, and critic, specialising in the study of Mormon literature. In 2022, he was given the Lifetime Achievement Award from the Association for Mormon Letters. He is the provost and vice president for academic affairs at Snow College.

After studying for his bachelor's and master's degrees from Brigham Young University, he earned a PhD in English literature from the University of California, Santa Barbara in 1997. He started his career as a university administrator at Shepherd University, where he was the dean of graduate studies. He worked as the provost and vice president of academic affairs at Newman University.

In his academic books, he often combines cognitive science with literary analysis. Two of his academic books examine political topics. Austin's works also frequently address Mormon literature. Austin's first academic publication, "The Function of Mormon Literary Criticism at the Present Time," argued for an expansive definition of Mormon literature and encouraged Mormon academics to create uniquely Mormon criticism of it. He has co-edited multiple books promoting the history of Mormon literature. He has been on the board of directors for Dialogue: A Journal of Mormon Thought and he is the director of BCC Press. His books about Mormon literature and thought have won awards for religious non-fiction and for criticism from the Association for Mormon Letters.

== Early life and education ==
Austin was born in Provo, Utah, in 1966. Austin started studying at Brigham Young University (BYU) in 1984. He served a mission for the Church of Jesus Christ of Latter-day Saints (LDS Church) in the California Fresno mission from 1985 to 1987. In 1987, he received third place in a New Era writing contest for his article "With All Thy Heart," and an honorable mention for fiction. He returned to BYU to receive his Bachelor's (1990) and Master's (1992) degrees in English. He studied at the University of California, Santa Barbara for a PhD in English literature starting in 1992 and received his degree in 1997.

== Administrative career ==
Austin was the chair of the English and modern languages department at Shepherd University, and later became dean of graduate studies there. He was the provost and vice president of academic affairs at Newman University starting in December 2008. He was the executive vice president of academic affairs and provost of the University of Evansville in Indiana. He began as vice president of academic affairs at Snow College in October 2023.

== Academic work ==
While working at Shepherd University, Austin taught freshman composition and world literature. He collected his selections for his world literature classes in a textbook entitled Reading the World: Ideas that Matter. His book Useful fictions (2011) was selected as a CHOICE outstanding academic title in the Language and Literature category.

New Testaments: Cognition, Closure, and the Figural Logic of the Sequel, 1660–1740 (2012) examines how sequels to popular works in the 17th and 18th centuries were demonstrated a human need for closure, but a resistance to a complete end. Austin envisions the New Testament of the Bible as a "sequel" to the Old Testament, and argues that sequels of the 1660–1740 period use the same methods of Biblical typology. In the same way that the New Testament reinterprets the Old Testament to prefigure Christ, so do the literary sequels reinterpret the texts they follow. Austin focused specifically on sequels or second parts to Paradise Lost, Pilgrim's Progress, and Robinson Crusoe. Elizabeth Kraft observed that Austin's "critical alertness" resulted in "richly textured revisionary interpretations" of the works he analyzed. John Traver at Digital Defoe found New Testaments to be "a very valuable approach for looking at the eighteenth-century sequel" but with "some limitations in its capacity to treat many poems or non-fictional prose 'sequels'". In Kevin Seidel's review of the monograph, he acknowledges Austin's "good insights" but criticizes his conception of the relationship between the Old and New Testaments of the Bible to make comparisons to sequels in the 17th and 18th centuries. Seidel stated that Austin compares sequels to the Old and New Testaments in a way that is convenient for his arguments.

In an interview about the book on CSPAN 2's BookTalk, Austin summarized his book, That's Not What They Meant!: Reclaiming the Founding Fathers from America's Right Wing (2012). He said that far-right politicians and conservative pundits have mischaracterized and mythologized the founding fathers as a hive mind, when they had views that contradicted each other and even themselves. Austin calls this hive mind "founderstein." The politicians and pundits attribute one or two things said by the founding fathers to represent them as a whole in order to shut down debate. Austin conceded that this trend has been ongoing for 200 years. Publishers Weekly found the book to be unbalanced, stating that Austin criticized right-wing entertainers and politicians but not left-wing ones, concluding that his "self-righteous disdain" would appeal to readers who had negative preconceptions about America's right wing. In a review for Free Inquiry, Rob Boston attributes Austin's focus on right-wing distortions to their commonly held belief that the original constitution is "a set-in-stone document". Boston complimented the "refreshing clarity" of Austin's writing and its sourcing.

We must not be enemies: restoring America's civic tradition (2019) looks at the history of democracy from its origins in Greece as a method of befriending people different from us. At its core, democracy requires investments from its citizens, including good-faith argumentation. At CHOICE, S. Mitropolitski recommended the book, describing it as combining ideas from cognitive psychology, theories of democracy, and history. Writing for the Journal of World Peace, Susan Cushman described it positively as "draw[ing] on examples from history to deliver a modern message".

== Mormon studies ==
Austin's first published academic article was "The Function of Mormon Literary Criticism at the Present Time," which was published in the Winter 1995 issue of Dialogue. The article won the 1995 Association for Mormon Letters award for criticism. The essay seeks to go beyond a simple dichotomy of literature that is faith-promoting or faith-destroying. It argues that the existence of a "Mormon literature" implies that the religious background of LDS Church members has created a greater cultural movement, at least in America. With this distinction, Mormon faculty at secular universities should contribute to criticism of Mormon literature as part of their regular research duties. He argued for an expansive definition of Mormon literature that would include journals and pamphlets and books written for non-Mormon audiences. His concluding argument was that only faithful Mormons can critique Mormon literature as faithful Mormons, and that accomplishing such literary criticism would legitimate the field of Mormon letters. Austin acknowledged the work as an "apprenticeship essay" concerned with the identity politics that were popular in the 1990s, but asserted in 2011 that he still believes in his core argument. In response to the essay, Joanna Brooks asked who we would define as "faithful Mormons": "The practitioners of Mormon "letters" can no longer seek familiar signs—ecclesiastical credentials, odd artifacts, or old assumptions, even when they pass as "metaphors"—as evidence of some abiding, essential kernel of "Mormon-ness." Austin's second academic publication, in 1997 on Angels in America, was also through Dialogue. At editor Levi Peterson's request, Austin became the book review editor at Dialogue from 2004 to 2006 and also served on the board of directors for the publication for two years during that time. He served again on the board of directors in 2012.

Austin has edited several books relating to Mormon literary studies. He edited A Voice in the Wilderness: Conversations with Terry Tempest Williams (2005). The collection of interviews "reveal Williams's passion for the land and her relationship with it." Austin co-edited Peculiar Portrayals: Mormons on the Page, Stage, and Screen (2010), which Eric Samuelsen hailed as "an outstanding group of papers".

Austin has collaborated with Ardis Parshall to edit The Mormon Image in Literature, a series of public domain books that contain significant portrayals of Mormons. It included The Mormoness; Or, The Trials Of Mary Maverick: A Narrative Of Real Events, Boadicea; the Mormon Wife: Life Scenes in Utah, and Dime Novel Mormons (a collection of four dime novels). Dime Novel Mormons won the John Whitmer Historical Association award for best anthology in 2018. Austin also collaborated with Parshall to edit Josephine Spencer: Her Collected Works, Volume 1, 1887–1899 (2022).

Austin co-founded BCC Press, a non-profit publisher, in 2017, with Steve Evans and Kristine Haglund. He is the press's director.

== Awards ==
Austin's works have received several awards from the Association for Mormon Letters (AML). Two of his books have received the award for religious non-fiction: Re-Reading Job: Understanding the Ancient World's Greatest Poem (2014), and Buried Treasures: Reading the Book of Mormon Again for the First Time (2020). His monograph Vardis Fisher: A Mormon Novelist (2021) won the award for criticism. Austin himself received the Lifetime Achievement Award from the AML in 2022. The award citation praised the way he "models both enthusiastic celebration of good work and the possibility of intelligent and humane disagreement with bad work."

== Personal life ==
Austin and his wife, Karen D. Austin, have two children and live in Ephraim, Utah.

== List of published works ==
=== As author ===
- Reading the World: Ideas that Matter (2007, first ed.)
- Useful fictions (2011)
- New Testaments: Cognition, Closure, and the Figural Logic of the Sequel, 1660–1740 (2012)
- That's Not What They Meant!: Reclaiming the Founding Fathers from America's Right Wing (2012)
- Re-Reading Job: Understanding the Ancient World's Greatest Poem (2014)
- We must not be enemies: restoring America's civic tradition (2019)
- Buried Treasures: Reading the Book of Mormon Again for the First Time (2020)
- Vardis Fisher: A Mormon Novelist (2021)

=== As editor or co-editor ===
- A Voice in the Wilderness: Conversations with Terry Tempest Williams (2005)
- Peculiar Portrayals: Mormons on the Page, Stage, and Screen (2010)
- The Mormoness; Or, The Trials Of Mary Maverick: A Narrative Of Real Events (2016)
- Reasoning Beasts: Evolution, Cognition, and Culture, 1720–1820 (2017)
- Boadicea; the Mormon Wife: Life Scenes in Utah (2016)
- Dime Novel Mormons (2017)
- Josephine Spencer: Her Collected Works, Volume 1, 1887–1899 (2022)
