= Elias: An Epic of the Ages =

Poem by Orson F. Whitney

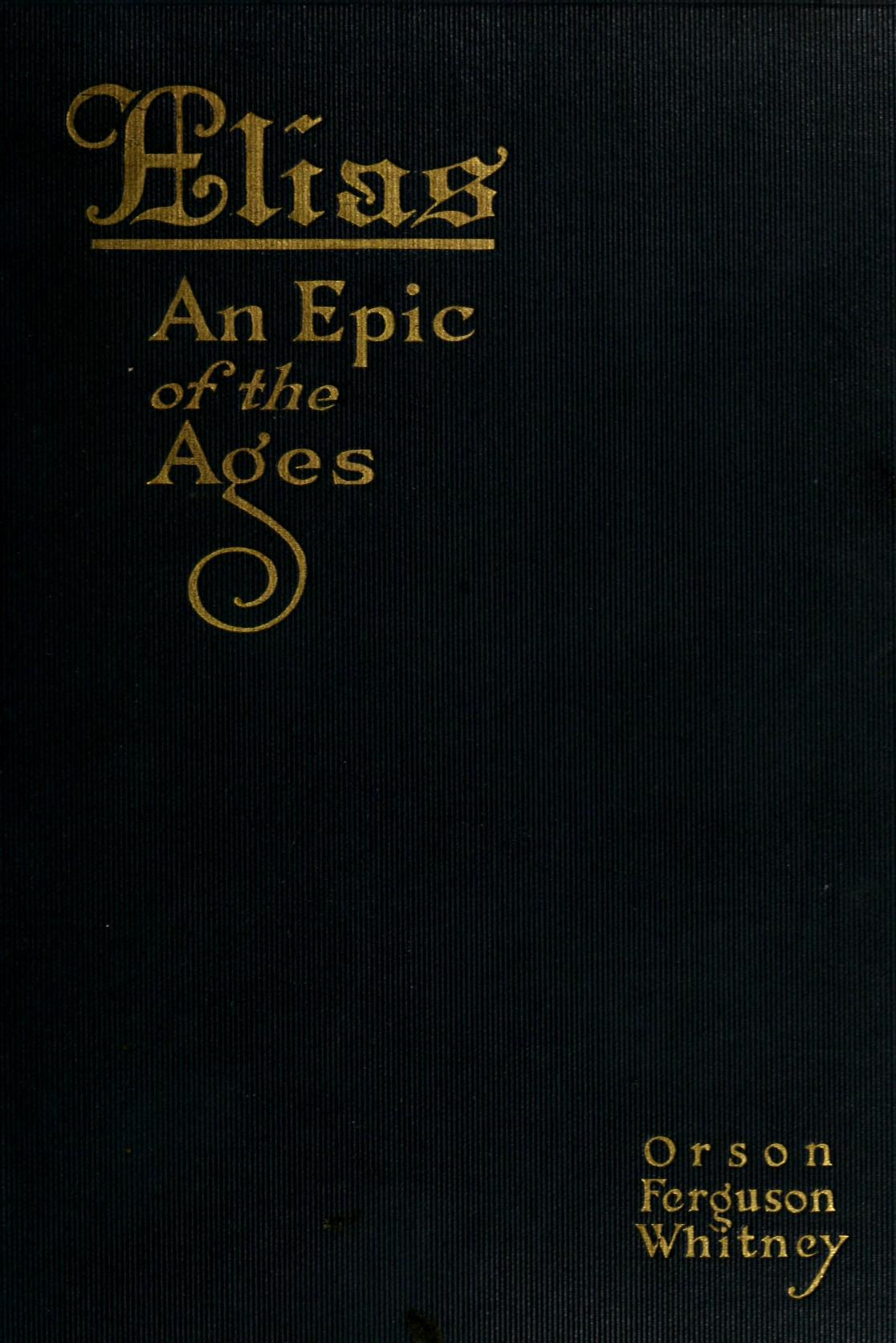
The 1914 edition of Elias

Elias: An Epic of the Ages is a book-length poem by Latter-day Saint poet Orson F. Whitney who described the work as "an attempt to present, in verse form, historically, doctrinally, and prophetically, the vast theme comprehended in what the world terms 'Mormonism'." The term "Elias" has multiple meanings in the faith, and the poem plays with these.

The poem was included in the 100 Works of Significant Mormon Literature list compiled by the Association for Mormon Letters.

== Publication history ==
Whitney had been ill and, believing he would die, prayed that "he might live to produce a work that would continue his ministry as a teacher after his mortal tongue was stilled." He felt an immediate inspiration to begin Elias, which he began early in 1900. Upon finishing a draft, he read the poem to private and school groups. Publication was undertaken in 1904 by a group of his friends (Heber M. Wells, George Sutherland, Anthon H. Lund, Richard W. Young, and H. L. A. Culmer) without Whitney's knowledge; he felt the book was not ready for publication, but accepted their financial backing of the project.

The following ten years, Whitney continued to "bring the book into a more finished state" until its 1914 publication. This publication included "explanatory notes for the benefit of students" with the intention that Elias could function as a textbook in schools.

== Structure ==
The book begins with a poetic "Dedication" to Joseph F. Smith, then a rendering of Doctrine and Covenants 77:9 as "Theme," an "Argument" in prose, and a table of contents laying out the remainder of the volume (with the notes following the epilogue):

Prelude—The Author's Purpose

Form: A single Spenserian stanza

Content: Whitney describes his survival from illness to write this book

Canto One—As From a Dream

Form: Blank verse

Content: The "author's spiritual awakening"

Canto Two—The Soul of Song

Form: Spenserian stanzas

Content: Elias appears as " the Soul of Song" as the author soliloquis[es] upon Utah's mountains

Canto Three—Elect of Elohim

Form: Eight-line stanzas in short meter

Content: The "beginning of the poem proper"; covers the Council in Heaven

Canto Four—Night and the Wilderness

Form: Blank verse

Content: An "allegory of the Christian or Meridian Dispensation" of the time following the deaths of Christ and John the Baptist, the "mission of the Comforter," and the Great Apostasy

Canto Five—The Messenger of Morn

Form: Blank verse

Content: The message of Joseph Smith

Canto Six—From Out of the Dust

Form: Spencerian stanzas

Content: The story of the Book of Mormon

Canto Seven—The Arcana of the Infinite

Form: Heroic couplets

Content: The esoteric or advanced principles of the Gospel

Canto Eight—The Lifted Ensign

Form: Blank verse

Content: The beginnings of the Church of Jesus Christ of Latter-day Saints

Canto Nine—Upon the Shoulders of the Philistine

Form: Heroic couplets

Content: The Saints' westward migration

Canto Ten—The Parted Veil

Form: Spencerian stanzas

Content: Joseph Smith's vision of his people's future destiny

Epilogue—The Angel Ascendant

Form: Blank verse

Content: An "address to and a response from" Elias

== Legacy ==
Neal W. Kramer, twice president of the Association for Mormon Letters, described Elias as "Mormonism’s true epic poem." He said it "aspires to reach the heights of Milton, Spenser, and Homer ... [and] there are moments when the verse, the narrative, and the doctrine combine to make supernal Mormon poetry."

Whitney would go on to write a second epic, the romance Love and the Light: An Idyll of the Westland (1918).
