= Francis Golffing =

American poet (1910–2012)

Francis Golffing (November 10, 1910 – January 9, 2012) was an Austrian-American poet, essayist, teacher, and translator.

== Life ==
Born in Vienna, Austria, to a family of industrialists, Franz Karl Golffing studied philosophy, art history, and literature in Berlin, Göttingen, Heidelberg, Freiburg, and finally Basel, where he obtained a doctorate in 1934 for his dissertation on the poetry of Friedrich Rückert. After post-graduate work in Grenoble he returned to Vienna where he worked as a journalist and radio commentator. He published his first volume of poems in 1938.

During the political upheavals in Germany in 1938, Golffing's family lost everything. The Nazis seized the family's factories and jailed Golffing's uncle. His younger brother Peter Conrad Golffing emigrated to America in 1938. Family lost their factory managed by his uncle, who was thrown into camp. Although Golffing had trouble obtaining a visa at first, in 1939 he was able to leave Austria for England, where he worked as a tutor. In 1940 he emigrated to the United States for a tutorial position at Stanford University.

At Stanford, Golffing met the poets Yvor Winters, J. V. Cunningham, and Barbara Gibbs (1912-1993). Gibbs and Cunningham were married, but they divorced in 1942, and Golffing married her soon after. He took a position at Utah State University, where he taught French, Latin, and Greek, and worked also as French instructor as Central High School. Through Brewster Ghiselin and Ray West, who curated a literary circle in Salt Lake City, he met the poet Ellis Foote, who would be a lifelong friend. Years later, Foote would credit Golffing with encouraging his work during several decades of withdrawal from the literary world:

My renascence in poem writing (after a 22-year death in city management) began a year ago… I was writing poems of a far more somber if not serious nature, partly from life … and partly from correspondence, particularly with two dear old friends and poets who had kept the faith over the years, Francis and Barbara Golffing.

Golffing and his wife also broadcast a daily cultural program on radio station KLO. He was drafted during WWII and served as a French translator.

In 1948, Golffing accepted a position at Bennington College, where he would teach French, English, philosophy, and semantics alongside writers including Stanley Edgar Hyman, Howard Nemerov, Bernard Malamud, Claude Fredericks, Ben Belitt, and Kenneth Burke during the school's golden age. He remained at Bennington for twenty years, with occasional leaves to teach in Berlin (where he headed the American Institute) and Heidelberg. During the summers, he served as director of the Cummington School of the Arts.

The poet Anne Waldman, who was one of his students, later reminisced, “I would sit in on Francis Golffing's class on Rilke simply to hear the German read out loud, though I couldn't understand it.” Among his many students was the illustrator Norman Rockwell, who enrolled as an adult to take a writing class with him in 1952.

In 1968, he resigned from Bennington in frustration over his low salary (Malamud expressed his sympathy), and moved to Peterborough, New Hampshire to become director of Humanities at Franklin Pierce College. Upon his retirement in 1977, he founded The Journal of Pre-Raphaelite Studies. He spent his final years in Waldoboro, Maine.

A wide-ranging intellectual, Golffing published in the fields of poetry, philosophy, literary criticism, art criticism. His major works include Gedichte (1938), Poems, 1943-1949 (1949), Aphorisms (1967), Collected Poems (1980), and Possibility: An Essay in Utopian Vision, with Barbara Gibbs (1963, 1991). His translations include Kandinsky's Concerning the Spiritual in Art (1947), and Nietzsche's The Birth of Tragedy & The Genealogy of Morals (1956). He contributed poems, translations, and essays to a wide variety of publications, including New Directions in Prose and Poetry (1941), Noonday (1958), Art International, Centennial Review, Commentary, Ethics, Euphorion, Germanistik, Hudson Review, Nation, Parnassus, Partisan Review, Poetry, Sewanee Review, Southern Review, and The New Yorker. He also pursued the visual arts, and mounted exhibitions of his paintings and drawings.

An archive of Francis Golffing's papers was sold by the antiquarian bookseller, Carpe Librum.

== Books and pamphlets ==
=== Poetry ===
- Gedichte (Vienna: Saturn Verlag, 1938)
- Poems, 1943–1949 (Cummington: Cummington Press, 1949)
- American Letters (Villiers Publications, 1957)
- Selected Poems (New York: Macmillan, 1961)
- Aphorisms (Amherst: Green Knight Press, 1967)
- To a Fair Detective and other poems (Amherst: Green Knight Press, 1972)
- Collected Poems (Omaha: Abattoir Edition, 1980), 1/252 copies
- Women’s Movement (Francestown, NH: R. T. Risk, 1980), 1/50 copies
- Women’s Movement II (Francestown, NH: R. T. Risk, 1981), 1/50 copies
- The Malcontent (Francestown, NH: R. T. Risk, 1982), 1/35 copies
- Neobule’s Soliloquy: After Horace, Odes III, 12 (Francestown, NH: R. T. Risk, 1983)
- New Poems (Francestown, NH: R. T. Risk, 1984)
- Poems, 1984–1986 (Francestown, NH: R. T. Risk, 1983), 1/40 copies.
- Finger Exercises (Francestown, NH: R. T. Risk, 1990), 1/15 copies. Broadside.
- Neobule’s Soliloquy: After Horace, Odes III, 12 (Francestown, NH: R. T. Risk, 1992), 1/20 copies
- Object Lesson (Francestown, NH: R. T. Risk, 1997), 1/35 copies
- A Glimpse of Montenegro (Francestown, NH: R. T. Risk, 1999), 1/60 copies

=== Criticism ===
- Friedrich Rückert als lyriker: ein Beitrag zu seiner Würdigung (Vienna, 1935)
- Possibility: An Essay in Utopian Vision, with Barbara Gibbs (Amherst: Green Knight Press, 1963)
- Possibility: An Essay in Utopian Vision, with Barbara Gibbs, rev. ed. (New York: Peter Lang, 1991)

=== Translations ===
- Wassily Kandinsky, Concerning the spiritual in art: and painting in particular, 1912, with Michael Sadleir (Wittenborn, Schultz, 1947)
- Friedrich Nietzsche, The Birth of Tragedy and The Genealogy of Morals (Doubleday, 1956).
- Likenesses: Translations (Francestown, NH: Typographeum, 1979), 1/75 copies.
- Georg Trakl, Seven Poems of Georg Trakl (Francestown, NH: R. T. Risk, 1985), 1/60 copies
- Else Lasker-Schüler, Five Poems of Else Lasker-Schüler (Francestown, NH: R. T. Risk, 1986), 1/50 copies
- Johannes Bobrowski, Boehlendorf: A Short Story and Seven Poems by Johannes Bobrowski (Francestown, NH: Typographeum, 1989), 1/125 copies in cloth
