= Clarice Short =

American poet

- Born: March 30, 1910; Ellinwood, Kansas, US
- Died: December 15, 1977 (aged 67); New Mexico, US
- Occupation: Poet

Clarice Short (March 30, 1910 – December 15, 1977) was an American poet and academic.

== Early life and education ==
Clarice Short was born in Ellinwood, Kansas, and grew up in the Arkansas Ozarks, and later near Taos, New Mexico. She attended the University of Kansas, where she earned her B. A. and M. A., She received her PhD from Cornell University in 1941.

== Career ==
Short taught in the English department at the University of Utah for 30 years, starting in 1946. At the University of Utah, she published research and gave talks on 19th century literature. She was active in University life, and was elected to the Theater council in 1952. At the University of Utah, an award for excellence in teaching was named after her. Short was president of the Rocky Mountain Modern Language Association from 1965 to 1967.

Her poetry was published in many journals, including the Western Humanities Review, Carolina Quarterly, and Poetry Northwest. Her work was published in the book Images and Impressions with fellow University of Utah professors and poets Ed Leuders and Brewster Ghiselin.

There are two published collections of Short's poetry. She published The Old One and the Wind in 1973. Later, Emma Lou Thayne, whom Short had taught in 1970, became Short's literary executor. Thayne helped bring Short's second collection, The Owl on the Aerial, to posthumous publication, and wrote an introduction for it. The Owl on the Aerial is a collection of forty-five poems, and it also contains a portrait of the poet drawn from her diaries by Barbara Duree, who selected the poems and produced the book.

== Reviews and criticism ==
Reviewers of the poems in Short's first volume, The Old One and the Wind, saw the influence of Robert Frost. In his review of The Owl and the Aerial, poet Jim Elledge says the poems have a mystic quality. Roscoe L. Buckland of Western Washington University calls Clarice Short "a poet of the first rank." He comments on the poems' technical quality, and compares her nature poems to Thoreau. He says her human portraits have the sadness and sympathy of Keats or Edward Arlington Robinson. Short is the subject of Emma Lou Thayne's article "Clarice Short: Earthly Academic" in the Association for Mormon Letters "AML Annual 1994, vol.1, p. 132.

== Poetry collections ==
- The Old One and the Wind, Salt Lake City: University of Utah Press, 1973.
- The Owl on the Aerial, Salt Lake City: Signature Books, 1990.
