= Helen Mar Kimball =

Wife of Joseph Smith, Jr. (1828–1896)

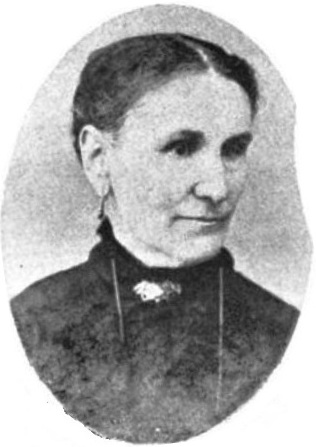

Personal details
- Born: Helen Mar Kimball; August 22, 1828; Mendon, New York, United States
- Died: November 13, 1896 (aged 68); Salt Lake City, Utah, United States
- Resting place: Salt Lake City Cemetery; 40.774°N 111.863°W
- Spouse(s): Joseph Smith (m. 1843; died 1844) Horace K. Whitney (m. 1846; died 1884)
- Children: 11, including Orson F. Whitney
- Parents: Heber C. Kimball; Vilate Murray

Helen Mar Kimball (August 22, 1828 – November 13, 1896) was one of 30 to 40 plural wives of Joseph Smith, founder of the Latter Day Saint movement. She was sealed in marriage to him when she was 14 years old. After his death when she was 16, she married Horace K. Whitney "for time"; Whitney was the brother of another of Smith's wives. She bore eleven children with Whitney, the first three of whom died at, or soon after, birth. Their son, Orson F. Whitney, became an apostle in the Church of Jesus Christ of Latter-day Saints (LDS Church).

== Early life ==
Kimball was born in Mendon, New York, as the third of nine children born to Heber C. Kimball and Vilate Murray. She was the only daughter to survive, and grew up being very close to her younger brother, William. As the only daughter, she was somewhat pampered by her parents. Kimball was three years old when her parents were baptized into the Latter Day Saint church in 1832. Kimball's family moved from Mendon to the church headquarters at Kirtland, Ohio, in the fall of 1833. When her father was called to be a church apostle in 1835, he was required to travel on missions and be away from home for significant lengths of time.

Kimball was baptized by Brigham Young in the Chagrin River during the winter when the river was frozen over. In order for her to be baptized, her father had to cut a hole in the ice. Kimball later wrote that she was not bothered by the cold water because she had "longed for this privilege" and that she "felt no cold or inconvenience from it".

In 1838, the Kimball family moved from Kirtland to Far West, Missouri, to join church members moving there. Their arrival in Far West occurred soon after the Battle of Crooked River, and tensions between the Mormons and Missouri residents were beginning to reach a peak.

In early 1839, the family was forced to leave Missouri as a result of the Extermination Order issued by Governor Lilburn Boggs. As they left during the middle of winter, Kimball remembered how they had to keep walking in order to avoid freezing. The family eventually arrived in the town of Commerce, Illinois, which later was renamed as the city of Nauvoo. Kimball's father eventually built a house in Nauvoo near the temple lot. Her father enjoyed rising importance within church leadership and became a very close associate of Smith.

== Marriage to Joseph Smith ==
According to Kimball, her father wanted to improve his standing by making a link between his family and the family of Joseph Smith. (Note: Kimball explains that her father took the initiative to arrange the marriage: "Having a great desire to be connected with the Prophet Joseph, he offered me to him; this I afterwards learned from the Prophet's own mouth.")

Todd Compton, an LDS Church member and historian offered an apologia for the marriage:

The prophet's marriage to her seems to have been largely dynastic—a union arranged by Joseph and Heber to seal the Kimball family to a seer, church president, and presiding patriarchal figure of the dispensation of the fullness of times.

In the spring of 1843, when Helen was 14 years old, her father described the doctrine of plural marriage to her. He asked if she would consent to be "sealed to Joseph". Helen described her reaction to this proposition:

My father was the first to introduce it to me, which had a similar effect to a sudden shock of a small earthquake. When he found (after the first outburst of displeasure for supposed injury) that I received it meekly, he took the first opportunity to introduce Sarah Ann [Whitney] to me as Joseph's wife.

Smith gave Helen 24 hours to respond to this request. The girl consented only after Smith explained to her that it would ensure her eternal salvation, along with that of her family. She wrote in her autobiography:

This promise was so great that I will-ingly gave myself to purchase so glorious a reward. None but God & his angels could see my mother’s bleeding heart—when Joseph asked her if she was willing, she replied “If Helen is willing I have nothing more to say.”

Helen was sealed to Smith in May 1843 when she was 14 and he was 37. The marriage was kept secret, and Helen continued to live with her parents. Helen despised the concept of polygamy, stating that, "seeing the trials of my mother, felt to rebel. I hated polygamy with my heart." Later in her life, however, she became a vigorous defender of the practice and wrote a number of publications praising it. With regard to her feelings about Smith's implementation of the practice, Kimball wrote,

It was a strange doctrine, and very dangerous too, to be introduced at such a time, when in the midst of the greatest trouble Joseph had ever encountered. The Missourians and Illinoisans were ready and determined to destroy him. They could but take his life, and that he considered a small thing when compared with the eternal punishment which he was doomed to suffer if he did not teach and obey this principle. No earthly inducement could be held forth to the women who entered this order. It was to be a life sacrifice for the sake of an everlasting glory and exaltation.

During the time that Helen lived in Nauvoo, she and Sarah Ann Whitney, who was also one of Smith's plural wives, became very close friends. According to Helen, she and Sarah were like "the two halves of one soul." Sarah's brother, Horace Whitney, married Helen "for time" after Smith's death in 1844.

== Marriage to Horace Whitney ==
After Smith was killed in 1844, Kimball was 16 and had formed a relationship with 22-year-old Horace Whitney, a brother of another of Smith's wives. After a period of courtship, the two decided to be "married for time" on February 3, 1846. Shortly before the exodus from Nauvoo, in the Nauvoo Temple, Kimball was married to Whitney "for time" and again sealed to Smith (deceased) "for eternity," with Whitney standing in as proxy for Smith. The following day, Whitney was sealed to Elizabeth Sykes (deceased) for eternity, with Kimball standing in as proxy for Sykes.

The Whitneys began the journey across the plains during the exodus from Nauvoo. They reached Winter Quarters, Nebraska, in June 1846. Nineteen-year-old Helen bore her first child in May 1847 while her husband was away on an expedition to the Salt Lake Valley. The child was stillborn. In August 1848, while on the plains during the journey west, Helen had another child, who died shortly after birth. This birth resulted in complications to Helen's health, which almost resulted in her death. Following a long battle to regain her health, Helen bore her third child, who was born and died in September 1849. She eventually bore a total of eleven children with Whitney. They were married for 38 years before his death. Their son, Orson F. Whitney became an LDS Church apostle.

Helen became a journalist, writing articles for the Deseret News and the Woman's Exponent. She also wrote the pamphlets "Plural Marriage as Taught by the Prophet Joseph" and "Why We Practice Plural Marriage", which defended the truthfulness and uprightness of this practice.

In 1896, Helen Kimball Whitney died at the age of 68 in Salt Lake City, Utah.

== Controversy regarding Kimball's marriage to Joseph Smith ==
The marriage of Helen Mar Kimball and Joseph Smith has long been a subject of controversy, most often with regard to her age at the time of the marriage. Jon Krakauer, in his book Under the Banner of Heaven (2003), says that of the women married to Smith: "Several were still pubescent girls, such as fourteen-year-old Helen Mar Kimball". During a 2003 interview, Krakauer said: "They will not like the fact that I point out that Joseph Smith told 14-year-old girls 'God says you should marry me, you and your family will be exalted to heaven.' His way of getting laid doesn't reflect well on him."

Responding to Krakauer's characterization of Kimball's marriage to Smith, Latter-day Saint author Craig Foster complained that Krakauer was being unfair by using his modern-day sensibilities in commentary. Foster cited examples of women marrying at a young age in colonial America. Mormon historian J. Spencer Fluhman agrees that Kimball's age of marriage was "unusual," and frames her young age of marriage and coercive entry into her plural marriage as "marked by anguish and faith, the twin inheritances of any redemptive sacrifice in Latter-day Saint theology." In Kimball's own defense of the practice, she argues that entering into plural marriage was an act of supreme faith in Mormon doctrine: "a life-sacrifice for the sake of an everlasting glory and exaltation." Of Smith's known wives, historian Todd Compton estimated that about one third were between fourteen and twenty at the time of marriage.
