= Ghiselin =

Ghiselin is a surname. Notable people with the surname include:

- Brewster Ghiselin (1903–2002), American poet and academic
- Johannes Ghiselin (fl. 1491–1507), Flemish composer
- Michael Ghiselin (born 1939), American biologist, philosopher, and historian of biology
- Ogier Ghiselin de Busbecq (1522–1592), Flemish writer, herbalist and diplomat
