= Rachel Hunt Steenblik =

American author and poet

Rachel Hunt
- Education: Brigham Young University (B.A.) Simmons College (MLIS) Claremont Graduate University (PhD candidate in philosophy of religion and theology candidate)
- Occupation: Writer
- Writing career
- Language: English language

Rachel Hunt is an American author and poet. Her writings have focused on topics of faith, motherhood, and feminism, particularly in relation to her own Mormonism and the belief in a Heavenly Mother. Her poetry compilation, Mother's Milk, won the 2017 award for poetry from the Association for Mormon Letters.

== Works ==
- Mormon Feminism: Essential Writings (Co-Editor). Oxford, 2015. ISBN 978-0-19-024803-1
- Mother's Milk: Poems in Search of Heavenly Mother (Author). By Common Consent Press, 2017. ISBN 0-998-60522-0
- I Gave Her a Name (Author). By Common Consent Press, 2019. ISBN 1-948-21812-7

== See also ==
- Latter-day Saint poetry
- Mormon feminism
