= Mary Lythgoe Bradford =

American poet (1930–2022)

Mary Lythgoe Bradford (October 24, 1930 – November 8, 2022) was an American editor and poet significant to Mormon literature. She was the editor of Dialogue: A Journal of Mormon Thought from 1978 to 1983, edited Mormon Women Speak (1982), and was included on the "75 Significant Mormon Poets" list compiled by Gideon Burton and Sarah Jenkins. She was the first Mormon critic to engage on a scholarly level with the work of Virginia Sorensen and has written about other authors such as Lowell L. Bennion. Her work has appeared in many religious and regional magazines, journals, and anthologies.

== Life ==
Bradford was born in Salt Lake City, Utah. She earned a B.A. and a M.A. from the University of Utah, where she taught English. She later taught English at Brigham Young University. She also taught writing briefly at American University in Washington, D.C.

Bradford's book Leaving Home: Personal Essays won the 1998 Association for Mormon Letters personal essay award. Her book Lowell L. Bennion: Teacher, Counselor, Humanitarian garnered the 1995 Best Biography Award from the Mormon History Association and the Evans Biography Award for best biography.

Bradford was married to Charles Henry Bradford (died 1991), with whom she had three children. She died in Provo on November 8, 2022, at the age of 92.

== Publications ==
- Mormon Women Speak: A Collection of Essays (1982)
- A Marriage of Equals (1985) by Dennis L. Lythgoe (she wrote the foreword)
- Leaving Home: Personal Essays (1987)
- Lowell L. Bennion: Teacher, Counselor, Humanitarian (1995)
- Purple Poems (2009)
- Mr. Mustard Plaster and Other Mormon Essays (2015)
