= Ellis Foote =

American poet

Ellis Foote (16 Nov 1911 – 8 Sep 1991) was an American poet. Largely self-educated, the vibrant, experimental work he published in the 1940s, largely unknown today, endeared him to such Western literary figures as Vardis Fisher and Alan Swallow, and may have influenced writers of the Beat Generation.

== Life ==
Foote was born near Quitchumpah Creek in Emery County, Utah. He attended school only through the ninth grade, and was largely self-educated, taking classes at Brigham Young University and other extension programs. A member of the Church of Jesus Christ of Latter-day Saints, he spent his missionary period in Council Bluffs, Iowa, and Leadville, Colorado. He married Norma Schreiner on May 20, 1937 in the Salt Lake LDS Temple. They would have five children.

In the early 1940s, through the writing programs organized by the poet Brewster Ghiselin at the University of Utah, Foote was introduced to a Western literary community. His associates included Ghiselin, the novelist Vardis Fisher, the critic George Snell, and the poet Francis Golffing. He spent his final years in Boulder, Colorado.

Foote published his works in a number of literary journals, including American Book Collector, New Mexico Quarterly, Prairie Schooner, and Neurotica. His first book was the first—and evidently the only—volume published by the Rocky Mountain Review. Foote's second major book was published by Alan Swallow.

Foote withdrew from publishing in the early 1950s, focusing on a career in municipal administration. During his professional life, he served as city manager for several Western settlements, including Moab, Utah, which he noted was "in the heart of the Colorado Plateau country where all the uranium is being discovered." He was the first town manager of Hayden, Arizona, and served in similar capacity in Needles, California, and Willcox, Arizona.

During his period of withdrawal from the literary world, Foote continued to write for himself and a close circle of friends. He began to issue collections of his work once more in the 1970s. These later works were self-published in very limited quantity for private distribution.

== Critical reception ==
In a review, the publisher Alan Swallow noted that Foote's first book "is composed of experiments in a good many styles by a poet who obviously has not yet found his best method. The work is a good bit better than merely encouraging however.... Foote indicates that he is a poet to be reckoned with." Rather more sardonically, critic Tom Trusky called Foote "the first interesting and experimental poet from Zion." Vardis Fisher thought enough of Foote's work to use a poem by him as the epigraph for his book, Thomas Wolfe As I Knew Him and Other Essays (1963).

A review of Foote's Layman’s Fall in Poetry rhapsodized: “Mr Foote’s long symbolic poem is a remarkable achievement, showing great boldness of design as well as finesse of craftsmanship. … Throughout the composition we find a dazzling display of verbal and metaphysical wit and, what is more, a Mozartian lightness of touch, almost unknown in English literature outside of Joyce and Sterne.”

The literary historian R. J. Ellis suggests that an experimental poem Foote published in the first issue of Neurotica, a journal edited by Jay Landesman and treasured by literary bohemians, likely inspired writers of the Beat generation: "Ellis Foote's wild neologisitic experiments in "Hall Whalemocked the Damned" may (almost as much as Joyce's Finnegans Wake) have influenced Kerouac, whilst Foote's long-line forms may have been noticed by Ginsberg." A later issue of Neurotica featured a collaboration by Ginsberg, Kerouac, and Neal Cassady that represented their first commercially published work.

== Selected works ==
- Ballad of Garn Dull and Other Poems. Ogden, Utah: Rocky Mountains Press, 1943
- Layman's fall : a fantasy in the joyous mode. Denver: Alan Swallow, 1947
- "Hail whalemocked the damned ...", Neurotica 1 (Spring 1948) p. 29-30
- Blood's Pass and other poems: for Norma and the A's and B's. Salt Lake City: Ellis Foote, 1948.
- "The Unholy Testator" (on Vardis Fisher), American Book Collector, September 1963
- Down Apples from the Old Orchard. Willcox, AZ: Hunt N. Pluck Co. 1977
- By the dry lake's edge and other poems: selected 1977-1978. Willcox, AZ: Ellis Foote, 1978
- Earth turning to morning: selected poems. Boulder, Colo.: Ellis Foote, 1990.
