= Robert A. Rees =

American educator, scholar and poet

- Born: November 17, 1935 (age 90); U.S.
- Education: B.A. from Brigham Young University and M.A. and Ph.D. from the University of Wisconsin–Madison

Robert A. Rees (born November 17, 1935) is an American educator, scholar and poet. Beginning in 1998 he was director of education and humanities at the Institute of HeartMath in Boulder Creek, California. Currently, he is a visiting professor and director of Mormon studies at Graduate Theological Union in Berkeley.

== Biography ==
Rees, a graduate of Long Beach Woodrow Wilson High School, received his B.A. from Brigham Young University and M.A. and PhD from the University of Wisconsin–Madison.

== Academic career ==
From 1974 to 1977, Rees directed the Department of Humanities and Communications at UCLA Extension, overseeing continuing education programs in the humanities, communications and English-language instruction. He also developed ArtsReach, that provided arts education in California prisons and juvenile detention facilities.

From 1977 to 1992, he served as director of the Department of the Arts at UCLA Extension. Between 1982 and 1987, Rees concurrently served as assistant dean of UCLA's College of Fine Arts.

He retired from UCLA in 1992. From 1993 to 1996, he taught American literature at Vytautas Magnus University in Lithuania, including a Fulbright professorship in American Studies during the 1995–1996 academic year. He also taught at the University of California, Santa Cruz; the University of California, Berkeley; Pepperdine University; California State University, Los Angeles; and California State University, Northridge. At the Graduate Theological Union, he served as visiting professor of religion and director of Mormon Studies.

From 1999 to 2011, Rees was director of education and humanities at the Institute of HeartMath. He co-authored studies and developed educational programs addressing emotional resilience and learning environments.

During the 1980s, he organized academic conferences involving American and Chinese writers and scholars, with meetings held at UCLA and universities in China. In 1990, he joined a UCLA delegation invited by the Soviet Academy of Pedagogical Sciences to visit Moscow and Saint Petersburg to discuss educational cooperation between American and Soviet institutions.

Rees taught and lectured at universities in Lithuania, Latvia, Estonia and Russia during the 1990s. His appointment at Vytautas Magnus University included teaching American literature and participating in academic exchange programs following the dissolution of the Soviet Union.

== Works ==
Rees's scholarship has focused on Mormon literature, theology, and the relationship between religion and culture. He served as editor of Dialogue: A Journal of Mormon Thought from 1970 to 1976. His academic publications have examined the Book of Mormon, Joseph Smith, religious aesthetics, literature, ethics, and Christian discipleship. Among his edited volumes are Proving Contraries: A Collection of Writings in Honor of Eugene England (2005), The Reader's Book of Mormon (2008), and Why I Stay: The Challenges of Discipleship for Contemporary Mormons (2011). His later publications include A New Witness to the World: Reading and Re-Reading the Book of Mormon (2020). His scholarship has also addressed the relationship between Joseph Smith and nineteenth-century American literary culture, arguing for the distinctiveness of the Book of Mormon within the context of the American Renaissance.

=== Poetry and essays ===
Alongside his academic work, Rees has published poetry, essays, and literary criticism in journals including Dialogue: A Journal of Mormon Thought, Sunstone, BYU Studies, and other literary publications.

His poetry frequently explores themes of faith, memory, nature, and personal spirituality, while his essays address religion, ethics, literature, and contemporary social issues. He has also written opinion pieces for publications including The Huffington Post, the Marin Independent Journal, and the Contra Costa Times.

== Honors, awards and fellowships ==
- Woodrow Wilson National Fellowship, 1960;
- Danforth Foundation Fellowship finalist, 1960;
- Danforth Foundation Associate, 19681978; Faculty Fellowship, UCLA, 196667;
- Humanities Institute, University of California, 196869;
- Allies Award, Affirmation: Gay and Lesbian Mormons, 2012.
- Rees has won three awards in the personal essay from the Eugene England Foundation and two awards in poetry from the Association of Mormon Letters.

== Works ==
- Curriculum Vitae
- Essays
- Poetry
- Editorials

== Sources ==
- Robert A. Rees at the MLCA Database
- Official Graduate Theological Union page
- Short bio of Rees
- Neal A. Maxwell Institute listing of works by Rees
- Biographical blurb with article in Mormon Studies Review Vol. 2 (2015).
