= Tar River Poetry =

American literary magazine

The Spring 2008 issue of Tar River Poetry. Cover photo by Leanne E. Smith.

Tar River Poetry is now an independent literary journal, published twice a year (fall and spring) on its website: www.tarriverpoetry.com. It was created as a local publication in 1968 (Tar River Poets) and launched as a national journal with its current title in 1978.

== History ==
The journal grew out of an earlier publication, Tar River Poets, originally edited by ECU English professor and Director of the ECU Poetry Forum Vernon Ward. Tar River Poets published members of the Poetry Forum only (that is, poets local to Greenville, NC). Upon Prof. Ward's retirement, poet Peter Makuck took over the editorship and renamed the journal, opening it to outside submissions and publishing the first issue as Tar River Poetry in November 1978, but retaining the numbering system of the earlier journal (thus the first issue with the new name was published as issue 18, number 1). The 30th Anniversary issue, published in December 2008, included an interview with Makuck.

== Contributors and editors ==
Tar River Poetry has published many of the best-known American poets of the late 20th and early 21st century, including Pulitzer Prize and National Book Award winners Claudia Emerson, William Stafford, Louis Simpson, Carolyn Kizer, Henry Taylor, and A.R. Ammons, and many other well-known poets including Sharon Olds, Leslie Norris, William Matthews, Albert Goldbarth, and Patricia Goedicke.

- Vernon Ward (1968 - 1978)
- Peter Makuck (1978 - 2006)
- Luke Whisnant (2006–2024)
- Helena Feder (2024 - present)
