= Horace K. Whitney =

Horace Kimball Whitney (July 25, 1823 - November 22, 1884) was a Mormon pioneer and early settler of Utah. He was the son of Newel K. Whitney and father of Orson F. Whitney, both prominent leaders in The Church of Jesus Christ of Latter-day Saints. His wife, Helen Mar Kimball, had been sealed to church founder Joseph Smith in a celestial marriage as a plural wife before Smith's death, so she and Whitney were married "for time" (which time ended up being 38 years, during which they had 11 children).

Whitney was born in Kirtland, Ohio, the oldest child of Newel K. and Elizabeth Ann Smith Whitney. His parents were among the Campbellite followers of Sidney Rigdon in the area who joined the Church of Christ in significant numbers in 1830. This helped prompt church founder Joseph Smith to relocate the church's headquarters to Kirtland. Horace was baptized into the church at the age of nine by Reynolds Cahoon.

The Whitney family left Kirtland in 1838, intending to join the main body of what was now called The Church of Jesus Christ of Latter-day Saints in Missouri. However, church members were simultaneously being forced out of Missouri, so the family spent the winter in Carrollton, Illinois, before moving on to the church's next gathering place at Nauvoo. Although only 15, Horace secured employment in Carrollton teaching the country school. He continued teaching for a few years and also learned the trade of a printer in Nauvoo, working on the Times and Seasons newspaper.

Whitney married Helen Mar Kimball in the Nauvoo Temple on February 3, 1846, not long before leaving the city to follow church leaders to Utah. The sealing ceremony is reported to have gone as follows. First, Kimball's marriage to Smith for eternity was re-performed, with Whitney acting as a proxy for Smith. Next, Whitney and Kimball were married to each other for time. Finally (the next day), Whitney was married for eternity to Elizabeth Sikes, with Kimball acting as a proxy for Sikes.

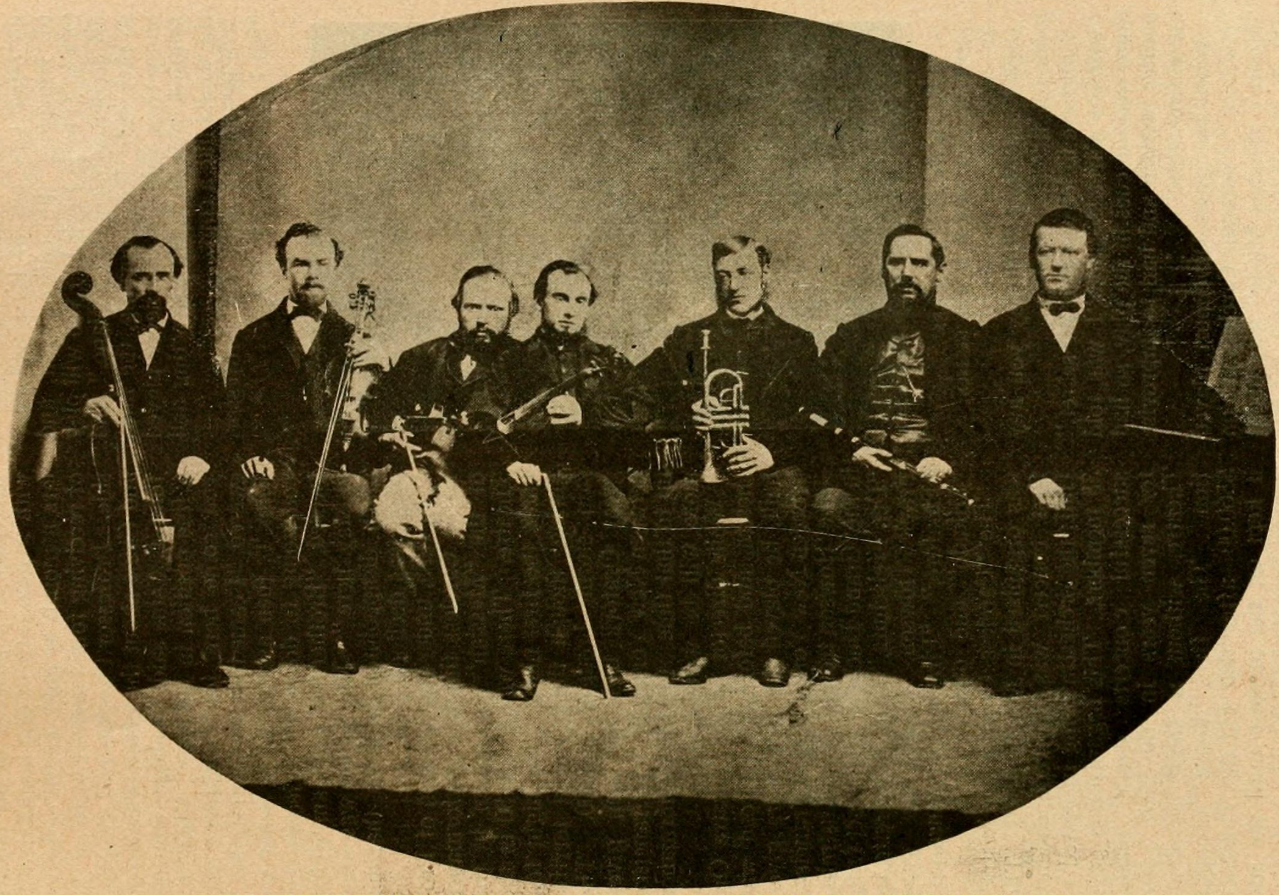
Whitney (second from right) in 1868 with the Salt Lake Theatre orchestra

Eventually, Horace and Helen moved to present-day Utah, with Horace entering the Salt Lake Valley on the 24th of July, 1847. In Salt Lake City, Whitney resumed his activities as a printer, working on the Deseret News for many years. He was also avidly involved in music and the theater. In early productions at the Salt Lake Theatre, he might equally be performing on stage or playing the flute with the theatre orchestra.

Horace was a member of the Deseret Dramatic Association which opened the Salt Lake Theatre.

Whitney died in 1884 and was buried in the Salt Lake City Cemetery.
