= Kristine Haglund =

American historian

Kristine Haglund was editor of Dialogue: A Journal of Mormon Thought in 2009–2015, is a current or former essayist at the weblogs By Common Consent and Times and Seasons, and noted Mormon historian and cultural commentator. She has suggested that the "experience of independent Mormon publishing sector [can provide] ... a potential model" for members "at a moment where new kinds of assimilation are called for."

She has an A.B. from Harvard in German Studies and an M.A. from the University of Michigan in German Literature. Also, a current Ph.D student in American Studies at Saint Louis University.

As part of her application for the editor position at Dialogue, Haglund wrote, "Many, many people long for a way to acknowledge the flaws of the church, to think and speak critically about silly aspects of our culture, and assess the inevitable mistakes of human leaders trying to interpret God's will, while still affirming the essential goodness of Mormonism. I've battled through some of the big issues—gender roles, homosexuality, intellectual freedom, historiography—and managed not just to stay in, but to stay happily."

== Book ==
- Eugene England: A Mormon Liberal (Introductions to Mormon Thought series, University of Illinois Press, 2022)
