= C. Terry Warner =

American writer

C. Terry Warner is an American academic, author and business consultant. He founded the Arbinger Institute, which does consulting and training based on his academic work on the foundations of human behavior and self-deception. In writings and seminars, Warner argues that people are responsible for their own actions and even negative emotions which are often used to accuse others rather than responding to their needs, and that people therefore have the power to free their relationships with others from negativity.

Warner holds a PhD from Yale University and is a professor emeritus of philosophy at Brigham Young University. In 1967 he joined the faculty at Brigham Young University, where he served as chair of the Philosophy Department, director of the Honors Program, and dean of the College of General Studies. Among Warner's students was Steven Covey, author of The 7 Habits of Highly Effective People. He was a visiting senior member of Linacre College, Oxford University.

== Arbinger Institute ==
Warner started the Arbinger Institute, in 1979, a leadership training and consulting firm, which has produced Leadership and Self-Deception a book recommended in a 2018 CNBC article called "Best Business Books Recommended by Bill Gates, Barack Obama and other successful people." The book focuses on seeing people as people rather than objects to overcome self-deception in the workplace.

The Arbinger Institute has two headquarters and more than 26 international partners.

- U.S.A. / State of Utah
- Germany / Hamburg
- United Kingdom / Buckinghamshire
- Sweden / Sweden
- Israel / Israel
- China / Shanghai
- Korea / Seoul
- Japan / Fukuoka

== Publications ==
- Bonds That Make Us Free: Healing Our Relationships, Coming to Ourselves, Salt Lake City, UT: Shadow Mountain Press, 2001.
- Oxford Papers, 1997.
- The Possibility of Language: A Discussion of the Nature of Language, With Implications for Human and Machine Translation (Benjamins Translation Library, Vol 14) with Alan K. Melby. December 1995.
- Bonds of Anguish, Bonds of Love, 1995.
- Honest, Simple, Solid, True, a speech given on 16 January 1996. (Christian message) MP3 Version
- Arm the Children: Faith's Response to a Violent World, BYU Studies Monographs with Arthur Henry King and Daryl Hague. September 1998.
- Why We Forgive Audio CD - June 2006.

Warner's book Bonds that Make Us Free: Healing Our Relationships, Coming to Ourselves is a self-help book that focuses on repairing damaged relationships and finding joy. In a review in Journal of Marital and Family Therapy, Tom Milholland says that Warner "uses an amazing blend of philosophy, theology, and psychology to provide insight and solutions..."

== The Education in Zion Project ==
Dr. Warner was the founding curator and exhibit director of the Education in Zion Gallery at Brigham Young University until he retired in 2009. The permanent exhibition, Education in Zion, tells the history of education in The Church of Jesus Christ of Latter-day Saints. The exhibition opened in the summer of 2008 and is in the Joseph F. Smith Building on Brigham Young University campus.
