= Barbara Gibbs Golffing =

American poet and translator (1912–1993)

Barbara Gibbs (September 23, 1912 – August 13, 1993) was an American poet and translator.

== Life ==
Gibbs was born in on September 23, 1912, in Los Angeles, and attended Stanford University and U.C.L.A. She was married to the poet J. V. Cunningham from 1937 to 1945, and, later, to Francis Golffing. She was a 1955 Guggenheim Fellow.

Her work appeared in Poetry, The New Yorker, The Nation, and The Hudson Review.

== Works ==
- The well: poems, A. Swallow, 1941
- The green chapel, Noonday Press, 1958
- Poems written in Berlin, Claude Fredericks, 1959
- The meeting place of the colors: poems, Cummington Press, 1972
- Francis Golffing, Barbara Gibbs, Possibility: an essay in utopian vision, P. Lang, 1991, ISBN 978-0-8204-1431-7
- "Some Feminist Literary Criticism and a Theory", The Journal of Pre-Raphaelite Studies, November 1985

=== Translations ===
- Marthiel Mathews; Jackson Mathews, eds. (1989). The flowers of evil. New Directions Publishing. ISBN 978-0-8112-1117-8.
- Paul Valéry, Le cimetière marin
- Angel Flores, ed. (2000). The Anchor anthology of French poetry: from Nerval to Valéry, in English translation. Anchor Books. ISBN 978-0-385-49888-3.
