= Peter Makuck =

American poet

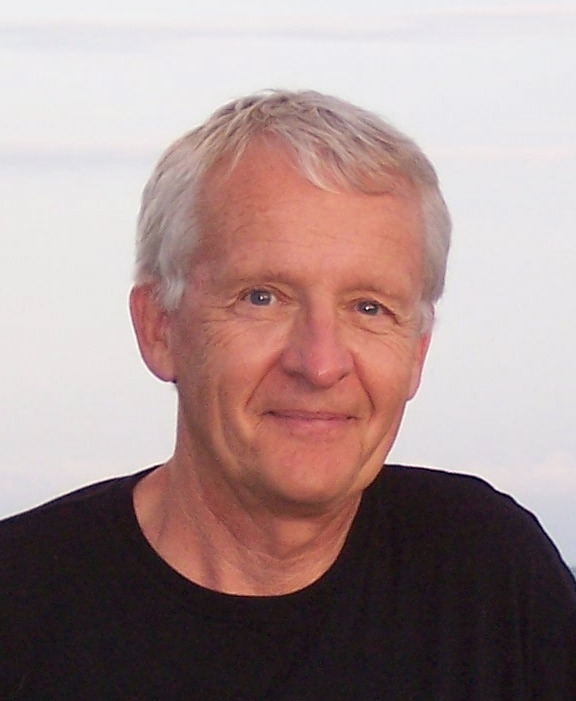
- Born: October 26, 1940; New London, Connecticut
- Died: June 21, 2023 (aged 82); Wilmington, North Carolina
- Occupations: Poet, short story writer, essayist, reviewer, professor

Peter Makuck (October 26, 1940 – June 21, 2023) was an American poet, short story writer, and critic. He was a distinguished professor emeritus of English at East Carolina University, where he was also the first distinguished professor of arts and sciences; he also served as visiting writer in residence at Brigham Young University, visiting distinguished professor at North Carolina State University, and visiting distinguished writer-in-residence at the University of North Carolina-Wilmington. In 1993, Makuck received the Charity Randall Citation from the International Poetry Forum. Poems, stories, and reviews by Makuck have been published in many leading journals, including Poetry, The Southern Review, The Hudson Review, Ploughshares, and others, and his work has been featured on the Poetry Daily website and on Garrison Keillor's Writer's Almanac. Makuck was the founding editor of the journal Tar River Poetry. He lived with his wife, Phyllis, on Bogue Banks, one of North Carolina's barrier islands. He died in 2023 after a long illness.

== Education ==
Makuck received his B.A. from St. Francis College (now part of the University of New England) in Maine, his M.A. from Niagara University, and his Ph.D. from Kent State University, where he wrote his dissertation on William Faulkner. As a student he witnessed the 1970 Kent State shootings; his early poem "The Commons" addresses this event.

== Themes ==
According to Lorraine Hale Robinson, Makuck's poems "repeatedly explore the themes of epiphany and second chances; of the relations of mystery, grace, and beauty; and of the revalatory effects of jolts of violence." He has a "compelling interest in place....[T]he landscapes of Eastern North Carolina have influenced his work," as has the desert Southwest (214-215).

Matthew Schmeer, in his review of Makuck's Off-season in the Promised Land, notes that

Acceptance is as an undercurrent in these poems: acceptance of time, of fate, of the changing seasons, of loss, of the gifts and glimpses of the natural world. It would be easy to label Makuck a naturalist after reading this collection, as fully three-fourths of the pieces are about encounters with whales, hawks, fish, weather, shifting sandbars and whatnot. But . . . Makuck does not see nature as wholly benevolent. There is always an undercurrent of danger, of quiet violence, times when a quick squall can blow in from offshore, when the beauty of the landed fish is admired for a moment before the knife is unsheathed. Hawks and hurricanes cannot be held to moral standards, and Makuck revels in revealing this seam where violence and calm collide. . . .

== Works ==
Poetry

- Mandatory Evacuation. Rochester, NY: BOA Editions, 2016. ISBN 978-1942683186
- Long Lens: New & Selected Poems. Rochester, NY: BOA Editions, 2010. ISBN 978-1-934414-32-3
- Off-Season in the Promised Land. Rochester, NY: BOA Editions, 2005. ISBN 1-929918-71-2
- Against Distance. Rochester, NY: BOA Editions, 1997. ISBN 1-880238-44-6
- Shorelines. Maryville, MO: Green Tower P, 1995. ISBN 978-1-887240-00-0
- The Sunken Lightship. Rochester, NY: BOA Editions, 1990. ISBN 0-918526-74-4
- Pilgrims. Bristol, RI: Ampersand P, 1987. ISBN 978-0-935331-03-5
- Where We Live. Rochester, NY: BOA Editions, 1982. ISBN 0-918526-40-X

Short Story Collections

- Wins & Losses. Syracuse, NY: Syracuse UP, 2016. ISBN 978-0815610823
- Allegiance and Betrayal. Syracuse, NY: Syracuse UP, 2013. ISBN 978-0815610151
- Costly Habits. Columbia, MO: U of Mo P, 2002. ISBN 978-0-8262-1446-1
- Breaking and Entering. Champaign, IL: U of Illinois P, 1981. ISBN 978-0-252-00925-9

Criticism

- An Open World: Essays on Leslie Norris. Co-edited with Eugene England. Rochester, NY: Camden House, 1994. ISBN 978-1-879751-82-8
