= By Common Consent =

Blog of contemporary Mormon culture, thought and current events

By Common Consent, a Mormon Blog
- Website type: Multi-author weblog discussing contemporary Mormon culture, thought and current events
- Available in: English
- Creators: Steve Evans, et al.
- Website: https://bycommonconsent.com (blog) https://www.bccpress.org/ (publisher)
- Launched: March 2004; 22 years ago
- Current status: Active

By Common Consent (BCC) is a group blog featuring commentary and discussions, especially regarding the culture of and current events within the Church of Jesus Christ of Latter-day Saints (LDS Church). It was founded in 2004 and is one of several blogs in the group known as the Mormon Bloggernacle. According to the blog's mission statement, BCC was founded to "provide a thoughtful, enjoyable, and reasonable place to post and discuss Mormon topics."

== Name ==
The blog is named after the 1830 revelation given to Joseph Smith, founder of the Latter Day Saint movement, which instructed that "All things shall be done by common consent in the church, by much prayer and faith, for all things you shall receive by faith." This statement is now canonized as Doctrine and Covenants 26:2 in the LDS Church.

Although "By Common Consent" was used immediately as a working title for the blog, readers were asked to give suggestions on a permanent name. Suggested names included:

- "The Rameumptom" — Before moving to the current URL, the blog's URL was rameumptom.blogspot.com
- "Zeezrom, Esq." — An homage to the heavy presence of legal professionals in the Mormon blogging community
- "By the Regular Sign" — A reference to the custom in the LDS Church to show support for a given proposition by raising the right hand
- "Fifth Nephi" — A reference to the Book of Mormon's four books of Nephi
- "Times & Seasons 2" — At the time BCC was established, Times & Seasons was the dominant Mormon blog
- "Pay On Gross" — A reference to a common debate among Mormons about whether tithing should be paid on net or gross income.

== Content and style ==
Although By Common Consent was originally created to provide a place for more politically liberal members of the LDS Church to discuss issues, a vast majority of the content found on BCC is not political in nature. The topics of posts frequently address practical application of tenets of the LDS faith, Mormon history, analysis of ancient and modern scripture, poetry, music, humor, and current events.

The blog gets updated daily by the "permas" (permanents) with additional posts provided frequently by guest bloggers. The blog supports comments from readers and aims to maintain an environment that fosters respectful interfaith dialogue, even though the majority of participants in comment discussions are adherents to the LDS Church. It includes articles, discussions, scholarly research, satire, devotionals, and humor.

== Recurring features ==
Since 2004, BCC has introduced several recurring features, including:

- Friday Firestorm: An open thread in which readers debate short, out-of-context passages taken from the scriptures or sermons from LDS Church leaders.
- The Illuminated Matsby: A digitally manipulated image by Matt Page blending Mormon culture, doctrine, history, and pop culture is presented without context or explanation as "an image of faith and devotion."
- Thursday Morning Quickie: An open thread in which readers debate short passages taken from an LDS youth program manual from 1956 on topics pertaining to dating, marriage, love, and related topics.
- The Top 10 LDS Musicians You've Never Heard Of: A series of guest posts promoting new musical artists who do not write or perform LDS music, focusing on the artistic and musical style of the featured musician and their life experiences.
- Police Beat Roundtable (PBR): A series in which 4-6 contributors discuss humorous entries from the police reports of The Daily Universe, Brigham Young University's campus newspaper.
- You Make the Call: As explained by permablogger Kevin Barney in the first edition of You Make the Call: "A friend reminded me of those old commercials featuring a close play in an NFL game, with the tagline You make the call!. The idea was for the TV viewer to pretend he is the referee and call the play how he sees it, and then compare the actual call the referee made in the game. So, in that spirit...this is a game where we examine a close play, and in the comments section of this blog, presumably without the benefit of guidance by the Spirit, we state our case for the call the official should make."
- Correlation: An Uncorrelated History: A series that details the cultural preconditions, emergence, historical development, and current configuration of the LDS Church's Correlation program.
- Theological Polls: A poll is embedded in the blog presenting readers with a question, typically related to some obscure or speculative element of Mormon doctrine or policy, often forcing respondents to choose between dichotomous or polemic answers.
- Church-Hacker: A series inspired by Lifehacker.

== Contributors ==
Over the years, BCC has featured a number of authors from the LDS community. The contributors to the blog come from backgrounds including homemaking, law, history, social sciences, humanities, fine art, biology, chemistry, and computer science. Religiously, the contributors represent "a varied swath of their lived religion," with different approaches to faith, doctrine, and religious living. Additionally, several of the contributors write for other online or print publications on topics such as literature, politics, pop culture, and science.

Note: the asterisk (*) denotes original authors.

=== Current (As of 2024) ===
Hodges B.

Holds a master's degree in religious studies from Georgetown University and works at the Neal A. Maxwell Institute for Religious Scholarship at Brigham Young.

Cynthia L.

Holds a PhD in Computer Science.

J. Stapley

Chemist and executive at a startup firm; also independent historian of Mormonism and member of the editorial board of the Journal of Mormon History.
John C.
Librarian and founder of the Mormon blog Faith Promoting Rumor
Karen H.*
Washington D.C.-based attorney, holds B.A. in Russian, Masters degree in Security Studies
Kevin Barney
Tax attorney, Mormon apologist, and expert in Biblical languages.

Kristine Haglund*
Editor, Dialogue: A Journal of Mormon Thought. Current research (as of 2024): Mormon aesthetic theory and practice; history of Mormon women's publications, including blogs; Mormon women's and children's history; Mormon hymnody and children's songs
Rebecca J.
Writer, mother.Russell Arben Fox
Assoc. Prof. of Political Science, at Friends University in Wichita, Kansas. From 2008, Book Review Co-Editor, Dialogue

Steve Evans*
Principal founder of By Common Consent. Prolific commentator on Mormonism and new media, and, Mormonism and social memory. Wisconsin resident. Lived in Seattle with his family as of 2024.
Steven P.
Assoc. Prof., Dept. of Integrative Biology at Brigham Young University, from 2000, teaching History and Philosophy of Biology and Bioethics. As of 2024, authored books, poetry, a novel and essays with Dialogue, Covenant, BYU Religious Studies Center, Irreantum, Amer. Tolkien Society, Newsweek and elsewhere.
Tracy M.
Tracy McKay, writer, graduate student at George Washington University (Fall 2012).
W.V. Smith
Professor of Mathematics at Brigham Young University and independent historian. Author of Textual Studies of the Doctrine and Covenants: The Plural Marriage Revelation (Greg Kofford Books, 2018).

=== Previous (as of 2024) ===
- Michael Austin: American academic, university administrator, author, and critic
- John C. Hamer: Independent researcher, historian, and mapmaker
- Margaret Blair Young: Author and documentarian
- Aaron B. Former Seattle attorney.
- Adam S. Miller
- Brad Kirmer, PhD candidate in sociocultural anthropology at the University of Michigan, with interests in semiotics, Marxist theory and Christian conversion. Contributed an article about early Mormon economics to "Mormonism: A Historical Encyclopedia" in 2010.
- Kyle M.

Blogger, musician, advertising executive, former missionary in Finland.

- Miles M

Writer, former missionary in Russia.

- M. Norbert Kilmer:

European high school teacher.

- Matt Page

Graphic designer and artist.

- Natalie B.

Law student.

- Ronan JH

European teacher.

- Sunny Smart
- Sam MB

Physician and medical researcher in Utah.

- Scott B.

Economist in Southern California and proud alumni of Utah State University.

=== Guests ===
BCC also features content produced by guest authors from the Latter-day Saints community, including sociologist Armand L. Mauss, biographer Gregory A. Prince, and parenting author Richard Eyre. Additionally, BCC periodically posts interviews with members of the LDS community, with comedian and author Elna Baker, and Michael Otterson, the former managing director of Public Affairs for the LDS Church.

== Awards ==
Since the initiation of the Bloggernacle's annual "Niblet" awards in 2005, BCC has consistently won the award for "Best Big Blog." In 2009, BCC authors won the Niblets in the categories of "Best Overall Blogger," "Funniest Thread," "Best Humorous Post," "Best Historical Post," "Best Personal Post," "Best Doctrinal Post," "Best Current Events Post," "Best Podcast," "Best Book/Article Review," and "Best Contribution to the Bloggernacle."

== Alliance with Dialogue ==
Several of the blog's long-term guest contributors are also editors or board members of Dialogue: A Journal of Mormon Thought. Kristine Haglund, one of BCC's permabloggers, is currently the Editor in Chief of Dialogue, while Ronan JH and Steven Peck, two other permabloggers, serve as Dialogue editors, and other current and former permabloggers contribute to the Dialogue editorial board.

== BCC Press ==
The editors at BCC inaugurated the non-profit book publisher BCC Press in April 2017, with the intent to publish books of Mormon-themed "philosophy, theology, history, scriptural exegesis, fiction, poetry, personal essays, and memoirs." Serving as president of the press is Steve Evans, attorney and popular Mormon blogger. Michael Austin (writer) is the press's director.

== BCC Zeitcast ==
Cover art for the BCC Zeitcast, by Matt Page

BCC is also the home of the BCC Zeitcast, one of the Bloggernacle's few podcasts. The BCC Zeitcast is typically approximately 30 minutes in length and takes the form of a talk radio, with anywhere from two to five contributors participating in a given episode. The podcast consists of a free-flowing conversation on Bloggernacle meta-topics, popular culture, current events, religious topics, or news from the world of Mormonism.

The first BCC Zeitcast was posted on January 11, 2007, with subsequent episodes recorded and posted semi-regularly until Spring 2009. During this period, the primary contributors were permabloggers from BCC such as Steve Evans, Ronan JH, Amri Brown, and Brad Kramer, but would occasionally feature guests. The BCC Zeitcast returned in December 2009, with largely new permabloggers contributing to the new season.

== See also ==
- Blogs about Mormons and Mormonism
- DezNat (Deseret Nation) (frequent critics of By Common Consent)
- List of blogs
- Mormon Stories
