= Linda Sillitoe =

American poet

Linda Buhler Sillitoe (July 31, 1948 – April 7, 2010) was an American journalist, poet and historian. She is best known for her journalistic coverage about Mark Hofmann and the "Mormon forgery murders." Her subsequent book Salamander, coauthored with Allen Roberts, examined Hofmann's creation of an industry for forged documents, the 1985 bombing murders of two people, and the police investigation, arrest and conviction. The murder investigation eventually revealed Hofmann's documents, initially seen as undermining the early history of the Church of Jesus Christ of Latter-day Saints, were forgeries. Sillitoe’s published works also included fiction and poetry.

== Biography ==
Sillitoe was one of eight children born to Robert E. and Phyllis Liddle Buhler. She was reared in Salt Lake City, Utah and graduated from the University of Utah. She married John Sillito (spelling difference intentional), in 1968 and they had three children.

Sillitoe was a staff writer for the Deseret News and news feature editor for Utah Holiday magazine. She produced articles which also appeared in The New York Times, The Philadelphia Inquirer, Dialogue: A Journal of Mormon Thought, Utah Business, Sunstone, City Weekly and The Salt Lake City Observer. She was an important feminist voice, particularly among Mormon women. Much of her later work focused on multicultural issues. In 1986, she won an award from the Utah Navajo Development Council "for her interest and sensitivity in reporting problems facing the Utah Navajo People." She won awards from the Utah chapter of the Society of Professional Journalists and the Associated Press. Sillitoe received three nominations for a Pulitzer Prize for her stories about life in Salt Lake County.

Sillitoe co-produced a PBS-affiliated documentary, "Native and American" and taught classes in writing at the University of Utah, Salt Lake Community College and Weber State University. She most recently worked as public outreach coordinator of Weber State University’s Stewart Library.

Sillitoe was born a member of the Church of Jesus Christ of Latter-day Saints. Her inquisitive nature and feminist beliefs pushed her faith in the LDS Church until she no longer believed. In the early 1990s, she requested that her name be removed from the member rolls and the LDS Church complied.

After a long battle with chronic fatigue and immune dysfunction syndrome (CFIDS), Sillitoe died on April 7, 2010, at the age of 61, of an aortic dissection.

== Author ==
Sillitoe wrote three books on Utah history: Banking on the Hemingways: Three Generations of Banking in Utah and Idaho; Salamander: The Story of the Mormon Forgery Murders (co-authored with Allen Roberts); and Friendly Fire: The ACLU in Utah. In 1996 she wrote the official centennial history of Salt Lake County, published in a popular format as Welcoming the World: A History of Salt Lake County.

Sillitoe published two collections of poetry, Crazy for Living and Owning The Moon (Signature Books 2017); a short-story collection, Windows on the Sea; and four novels, Sideways to the Sun, Secrets Keep, The Thieves Of Summer (Signature Books 2014), and Twist of Plot (independently published in 2019).

In 2020, the University of Utah Press published One Voice Rising, co-authored with Ute elder Clifford Duncan about his life, with photographs by George Janacek.

Linda Sillitoe received numerous awards, including AML Awards from the Association for Mormon Letters in 1977, 1980, 1981, 1987, and 1993.

== Selected works ==
- Sideways to the Sun, 1987
- Salamander: Story of Mormon Forgery Murders, with Allen D. Roberts, editions published in 1988, 1989, 2006
- Windows on the Sea and Other Stories, 1989
- Banking on the Hemingways: Three Generations of Banking in Utah and Idaho, 1992
- Crazy for Living: Poems, 1993
- Secrets Keep, 1996
- Friendly Fire: The ACLU in Utah, 1996
- Welcoming the World: A History of Salt Lake County, 1996
- The Thieves Of Summer, 2014
- Owning the Moon, 2017
- "Twist of Plot", 2019
- "One Voice Rising" with Clifford Duncan and George Janacek, 2020
