= J. V. Cunningham =

American poet (1911–1985)

James Vincent Cunningham (August 23, 1911 – March 30, 1985) was an American poet, literary critic and teacher.

== Background ==
Cunningham is described as a neo-classicist or anti-modernist. His poetry was distinguished by its clarity, brevity and traditional formality of rhyme and rhythm at a time when many American poets were breaking away from traditional fixed meters.

Cunningham's finely crafted epigrams in the style of Latin poets were much praised and frequently anthologized. But he also wrote spare, mature poems about love and estrangement, most notably the 15-poem sequence entitled To What Strangers, What Welcome (1964).

Cunningham was also a fine translator with a lifelong interest therein.

== Life ==
Cunningham was born in Cumberland, Maryland in 1911, the son of Irish Catholic parents. His father, James Joseph Cunningham, was a steam-shovel operator for a railroad who moved the family to Billings, Montana, and later to Denver, Colorado where Cunningham spent his youth. His mother was Anna Finan Cunningham. Cunningham's brother Maurice Patrick Cunningham (1913-1978) was also a noted classicist and authority on the Latin poets Ovid and Prudentius. Cunningham graduated from Regis High School in Denver 1927 at age fifteen, showing great skills in Latin and Greek. In high school, he first corresponded with Yvor Winters who was then a graduate student at Stanford University and who later became an influential poet and critic.

The death of Cunningham's father in an accident and the family's resulting financial hardship prevented Cunningham from continuing immediately to college. He worked for a while as a "runner" for a brokerage house on the Denver Stock Exchange, where he personally witnessed two suicides in the days immediately following the October 29, 1929, stock market crash.

With the onset of the Great Depression, he rode the rails from odd job to odd job, throughout the Western United States, including stints as a local newspaper reporter and a writer for trade publications such as Dry Goods Economist. In 1931, Cunningham again struck up a correspondence with Winters who offered him the opportunity to stay in a shed on Winters' property and to attend classes at Stanford University where Winters was teaching. Cunningham earned an A.B. in classics in 1934 and a Ph.D. in English in 1945—both from Stanford.

During World War II, Cunningham taught mathematics to Air Force pilots. He later earned his living primarily by teaching English and writing at the University of Chicago, the University of Hawaiʻi, Harvard University, the University of Virginia and Washington University in St. Louis. He took a position at Brandeis University in 1953, soon after the school was founded, and taught there until he retired in 1980. As a teacher and critic, Cunningham often concentrated on Shakespeare and the English Renaissance, authoring works such as Woe or Wonder: The Emotional Effect of Shakespearean Tragedy.

Cunningham was married three times including to the poet Barbara Gibbs in 1937 (divorced 1945), with whom he had a daughter, Cunningham's only child. He died of heart failure in Marlborough, Massachusetts, in 1985.

He was the model for the book Stoner by John Williams.

== Poetry ==
Cunningham's output was as spare as his style (sometimes called the Plain Style). Over his relatively long career he published only a few hundred poems, many just a few lines long. He was considered one of three or four masters of the epigram form in the English language. Many of his epigrams included social and moral observations and were incisive, acerbic, and judicatory.

Cunningham's epigrams (including his translations of the Latin poet Martial) and short poems were often witty and sometimes ribald. Richard Wilbur labeled him our best epigrammatic poet. He was one of a small number of modern writers to treat the epigram in its full, classical sense: a short, direct poem, not necessarily satirical, dealing with subjects from the whole range of personal experience. His epigrams have been described as both brilliant and quotable.

Cunningham's longer poems "tend toward the epigrammatical, little quotable bits that express thoughts with exceptional neatness." His plain-spoken lyrics about love, sex, loss, and the American West are especially haunting and original, but he was also capable of investing abstract ideas – both mathematical and philosophical – with considerable emotional force.

Critics often yoked him to his early influence, Yvor Winters, but his verse actually bears only a formalistic similarity to Winters's work. Cunningham "inclined toward logical statement and syllogistic argument, saying so much in so little space, often in a single iambic pentameter couplet." He was impatient with definitions intended to embrace modernism, writing, "Poetry is what looks like poetry, what sounds like poetry. It is metrical composition."

The poet Thom Gunn, in reviewing The Exclusions of a Rhyme in the 1960s, commented that Cunningham "must be one of the most accomplished poets alive, and one of the few of whom it can be said that he will still be worth reading in fifty years' time."

Cunningham was awarded Guggenheim fellowships in 1959–60 and 1966–67 and received a Fellowship of the Academy of American Poets in 1976. He won grants from the National Institute of Arts and Letters in 1965 and the National Endowment for the Arts in 1966. Some of his poems have been set to music by the English composer Robin Holloway.

== Works ==
Poetry

- For My Contemporaries (1939)
- The Helmsman (1942)
- The Judge Is Fury (1947)
- Doctor Drink (1950)
- Trivial, Vulgar, and Exalted: Epigrams (1957)
- The Exclusions of a Rhyme (1960)
- To What Strangers, What Welcome (1964)
- Some Salt: Poems and Epigrams (1967)
- Let Thy Words Be Few (1986)
- The Poems of J. V. Cunningham (1997) ISBN 978-0-8040-0998-0

Prose

- Tradition and Poetic Structure (1960)
- The Journal of John Cardan, [with] The Quest of the Opal [and] The Problem of Form (1964)
- The Collected Essays of J. V. Cunningham, Swallow, Chicago (1976)

Other

- Let Thy Words be Few, Gullans Symposium Press (1988)
- The Problem of Style, Fawcett, New York (1966)
- The Exclusion of Rhyme (1960)
- A Bibliography of the Published Works of J. V. Cunningham, Charles B. Gullans (1973)
- Dickinson: Lyric and Legend, Sylvester & Orphanos (1980)
