= J. Spencer Fluhman =

American historian

J. Spencer Fluhman is a professor of history at Brigham Young University (BYU) in Provo, Utah.

Fluhman received a bachelor's degree from BYU and a master's degree from the University of Wisconsin–Madison. Fluhman also has a Ph.D. in American religious history from the University of Wisconsin–Madison. His doctoral dissertation was on 19th-century anti-Mormon literature. As a graduate student, Fluhman was part of a summer seminar on Mormon History at BYU run by Richard Bushman. Fluhman has held a fellowship at the Center for the Study of Religion and American Culture at IUPUI.

Fluhman is a member of the Church of Jesus Christ of Latter-day Saints. He served as a missionary in the church's Washington D.C. South Mission, which covered the Virginia suburbs of Washington and included the eastern panhandle of West Virginia.

At BYU, Fluhman has taught in both the History Department and the Department of Church History and Doctrine.

In 2013, his book "A Peculiar People": Anti-Mormonism and the Making of Religion in Nineteenth-Century America won the Mormon History Association's Best First Book Award.

On May 4, 2016, BYU announced that Fluhman had been appointed executive director of the Neal A. Maxwell Institute for Religious Scholarship. As of late 2016 Fluhman was the co-chair of the Mormon Studies Group in the American Academy of Religion.

== Publications ==
Books

- "A Peculiar People": Anti-Mormonism and the Making of Religion in 19th-century American, Chapel Hill: University of North Carolina Press, 2012, ISBN 9780807835715, OCLC 778244920
- The Doctrine and Covenants: Revelations in Context (with Andrew H. Hedges and Alonzo Gaskill)

Journal articles

- Fluhman, J. Spencer (Summer 2009), "Fashioning a Newer Mormon History", Journal of Mormon History, 35 (3): 214–218, JSTOR 23291029
- Fluhman, J. Spencer (Summer 2008), "An 'American Mahomet': Joseph Smith, Muhammad, and the Problem of Prophets in Antebellum America", Journal of Mormon History, 34 (3): 23–45, JSTOR 23290536

== Sources ==
- BYU bio of Fluhman
- Amazon.com entry on Fluhman
- SpencerFluhman.com
