= Clinton F. Larson =

American writer

Clinton Foster Larson (1919–1994) was an American poet and playwright and the founding editor of BYU Studies.

Larson was born in American Fork, Utah to Clinton Larson and his wife, the former Lillian Foster. Larson started college at the University of Utah at age 16 with plans to study medicine. However, he had an English class with Brewster Ghiselin who convinced him to that he had potential as a writer. He served as an LDS missionary in England and then in New England from 1939–41. In 1942 he married Naomi Barlow in the Salt Lake Temple. Around this time he entered the Army Air Corps in which he served during the duration of World War II. He completed his bachelor's degree at the University of Utah and later earned a master's degree from the same institution in 1948. He received a Ph.D. in English from the University of Denver.

Larson was professor at Brigham Young University. In the early 1970s he was made BYU's first poet-in-residence.

Possibly Larson's most widely read work was his 16-volume text of the Illustrated Stories of the Book of Mormon published by Promised Land Publications.

== Works ==
- Coriantumer and Moroni (1962)
- The Mantle of the Prophet and Other Plays (1966)
- The Lord of Experience (1967)
- The Prophet (1971)
- Counterpoint (1973)
- Romaunt of the Rose: A Tapestry of Poems (1982)
- The Civil War Poems (1988)
- Homestead in Idaho (1989)

== Sources ==
- BYU Exhibit entry on Larson
- Neal E. Lambert. "Clinton F. Larson: I Miss His Booming Laugh" in BYU Studies Vol. 49 (2010) no. 2, p. 178-183.
- Mormon Literature Database entry for Larson
- Deseret News July 12, 1994 Obituary for Larson
- Lael Woodbury, “Director’s Foreword to ‘The Mantle of the Prophet,’” BYU Studies Quarterly 2, no. 2 (April 1, 1960).
