= Orson F. Whitney =

American religious leader (1855–1931)

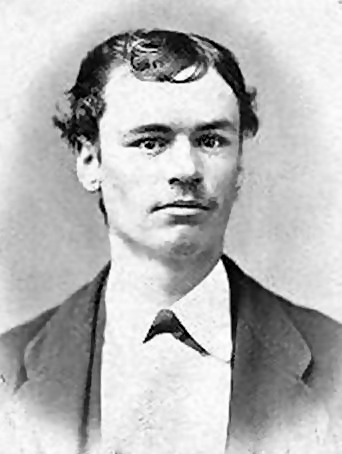
- ca. 1870-1875

Quorum of the Twelve Apostles
- April 9, 1906 – May 16, 1931

LDS Church Apostle
- April 9, 1906 – May 16, 1931
- Reason: Resignation of Matthias F. Cowley and John W. Taylor from the Quorum of the Twelve; death of Marriner W. Merrill
- Reorganization at end of term: Joseph F. Merrill ordained

Personal details
- Born: Orson Ferguson Whitney; July 1, 1855; Salt Lake City, Utah Territory, United States
- Died: May 16, 1931 (aged 75); Salt Lake City, Utah, United States
- Resting place: Salt Lake City Cemetery; 40°46′37.92″N 111°51′28.8″W
- Spouse(s): Zina Beal Smoot; May Wells, July 1888
- Children: Horace Newel; Heber Kimball; Emily; Helen Mar; Margaret; Charles Byron; Murray Wells; Albert Owen; Wendell Webb; Paul Van Colt; Virginia Clayton
- Signature

Orson Ferguson Whitney (1 July 1855 – 16 May 1931), born in Salt Lake City, Utah Territory, was a member of the Quorum of the Twelve Apostles of the Church of Jesus Christ of Latter-day Saints (LDS Church) from 1906 until his death.

== Early life ==
Whitney was the son of Horace K. Whitney and Helen Mar Kimball. Whitney's father, Horace, had set type for the original publication of the Deseret News and worked as a printer with the newspaper for 21 years.

== Background ==
Whitney was a politician, journalist, poet, historian and academic. In 1878, as a young man, Whitney began a career in writing with the business office of the Deseret News, later becoming a reporter and the city editor. Whitney served as a missionary for the LDS Church for a time in Pennsylvania and Ohio.

During a mission in Europe for the LDS Church from 1881 to 1883, he acted as editor of the church publication Millennial Star. In 1896 and 1897, Whitney taught English and theology at Brigham Young College in Logan, Utah.

In 1899, Whitney accepted the position of Assistant Church Historian and served in that position until he was called as an apostle.

Whitney was also involved in the politics of Salt Lake City and Utah. He served on the Salt Lake City Council in 1880, acted as City Treasurer from 1884 to 1890, and served as a State Senator in 1898, and again in 1901.

== Personal life ==
Like many early Mormons, Whitney practiced polygamy. Whitney had two wives (simultaneously), having married the second in 1888. After the 1890 Manifesto on polygamy, Whitney became a strong supporter of the policy ending polygamy.

== Writing ==
Whitney produced the lyrics to several LDS Church hymns, including "The Wintry Day, Descending to Its Close" (music composed by Edward P. Kimball) and "Savior Redeemer of My Soul" (music by Harry A. Dean); these hymns appear as numbers 37 and 112, respectively, in the current edition of the LDS Church hymnal.

Whitney's historical works, although detailed, well researched and presented, are written from a Latter-day Saint perspective; one 21st-century historian has commented that they are "locked in the ironclad orthodoxy" of Mormonism.

In June 1888 (and published the following month in The Contributor), Whitney delivered a speech entitled "Home Literature"; the speech is widely credited with proving both permission and impetus for Mormon literature and is the source of the sentence, "We will yet have Miltons and Shakespeares of our own."

Whitney prepared a biography of Lorenzo Snow, a member of the Quorum of the Twelve, for publication in 1890. However it was not published at that time. It was entitled, Latter Leaves in the Life of Lorenzo Snow. In 2012, Dennis B. Horne published an edited and expanded version of this work under the same title with Cedar Fort, Inc., of Springville, Utah. This work covered the Snow's life from 1885 to 1889 and was written as a continuation of Snow's sister, Eliza R. Snow's, work Biography and Family Record of Lorenzo Snow. In publishing this work, Horne included Whitney's work as the first nine chapters of his book and then covered the following 11 years of Snow's life. Horne's published record only included about a third of Whitney's manuscript of his history of Lorenzo Snow.

Publications include:

- The Life of Heber C. Kimball (1888)
- Poetical Writings (1889–90)
- History of Utah (4 Volumes)
- Elias: An Epic of the Ages (1904)
- Love and the Light: An Idyll of the Westland (1918)

== LDS Church service ==
In 1905, two members of the Quorum of the Twelve Apostles resigned over a dispute regarding the 1890 Manifesto, which prohibited any further plural marriages within the church. John W. Taylor disagreed with the Manifesto entirely; Matthias F. Cowley felt that it should apply only to the United States. In February of the next year, Marriner W. Merrill died, which left three vacancies in the quorum.

At a general conference of the church on April 8, 1906, Whitney was called as an apostle, along with George F. Richards and David O. McKay.

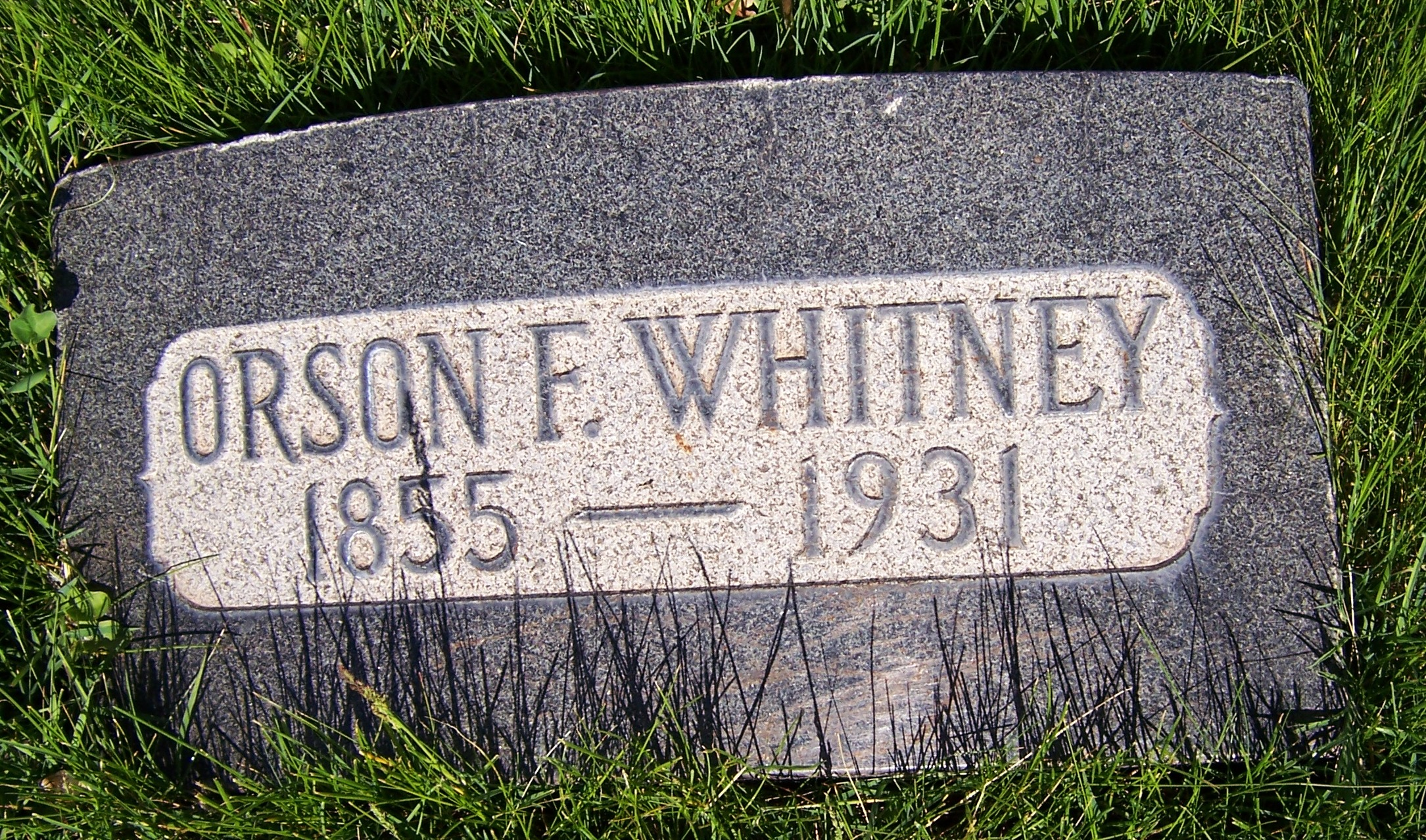
Grave marker of Orson F. Whitney.

== Death and legacy ==
Whitney died in Salt Lake City after being hospitalized for influenza. He was buried at Salt Lake City Cemetery.

Whitney is the namesake of the community of Whitney, Idaho.

== See also ==
- LDS fiction
- Whitney Awards

The Church of Jesus Christ of Latter-day Saints titles
Preceded by George F. Richards	Quorum of the Twelve Apostles; April 9, 1906–May 16, 1931	Succeeded by David O. McKay
