= Lowell L. Bennion =

American sociologist (1908–1996)

Lowell Lindsay Bennion (July 26, 1908 – February 21, 1996) was an American educator, sociologist, and humanitarian. He wrote extensively on religious living in the Church of Jesus Christ of Latter-day Saints (LDS Church), and was an advocate for volunteer service in Utah and Idaho.

== Biography ==
Bennion was born in Salt Lake City, Utah, the son of Milton Bennion and Cora Lindsay Bennion. In 1928, Bennion graduated from the University of Utah, married Merle Colton and then left to serve in the Swiss–German Mission of the LDS Church. Bennion spent much of his mission in Zürich, where he served as branch president. After serving two and a half years as a missionary Bennion began studies towards his Ph.D. at the University of Strasbourg. His wife came to France to live with him at about this point.

After earning his Ph.D. in sociology in 1933, Bennion returned to Utah and founded the Institute of Religion adjacent to the University of Utah in 1934. Bennion later founded the Teton Boys Ranch and served as its director for many years. He served as a bishop in the LDS Church. The first food bank and homeless shelters in Utah were founded by Bennion.

== Publications ==
- Lowell L., Bennion (1933). Max Weber's Methodology. Paris: Les Presses Modernes.
- —— (1939). Youth and Its Religion. Salt Lake City: Mutual Improvement Association of the LDS Church.
- —— (1940). The Religion of the Latter-day Saints. Salt Lake City: L.D.S. Dept. of Education.
- —— (1955). An Introduction to the Gospel. Salt Lake City: Deseret Sunday School Union Board.
- —— (1956). Teachings of the New Testament (2nd ed.). Salt Lake City: Deseret Book. OCLC 1335039. Expanded from his 1953 Sunday School manual.
- —— (1959). Religion and the Pursuit of Truth. Salt Lake City: Deseret Book.
- —— (1978). Things That Matter Most. Salt Lake City: Bookcraft. ISBN 0884943461.
- —— (1985). The Book of Mormon: A Guide to Christian Living. Salt Lake City: Deseret Book. ISBN 087747866X.
- —— (1988). England, Eugene (ed.). The Best of Lowell L. Bennion: Selected Writings 1928-1988. Salt Lake City: Deseret Book. ISBN 0875791867.
- —— (1990). Legacies of Jesus. Salt Lake City: Deseret Book. ISBN 0875793614.
- —— (1996). How Can I Help?: Final Selections By the Legendary Writer, Teacher, and Humanitarian. Salt Lake City: Aspen Books. ISBN 1562362291.
- —— (1983). I Believe. Salt Lake City: Deseret Book Company. ISBN 0-87747-954-2.
- —— (1988). Do Justly and Love Mercy--Moral Issues for Mormons. Centerville, Utah: Canon Press. ISBN 0-939651-01-7.

== Sources ==
- Bradford, Mary Lythgoe (2000), "Lowell L. Bennion", in Garr, Arnold K.; Cannon, Donald Q.; Cowan, Richard O. (eds.), Encyclopedia of Latter-day Saint History, Salt Lake City, Utah: Deseret Book, ISBN 1573458228
- England, Eugene (July 1988). "A Bibliography of Works by and About Lowell L. Bennion" (PDF). Sunstone: 31–5.
- Alder, Douglas D. (1988), "Lowell L. Bennion - "The Things That Matter Most"", in Barlow, Philip L. (ed.), Teachers Who Touch Lives - Methods of the Masters, Bountiful, Utah: Horizon Publishers, ISBN 0-88290-334-9
