= Lance Larsen =

American poet

Lance Larsen (born 1961 in Pocatello, Idaho) is an American poet. He served as poet laureate of Utah from 2012 to 2017. In 2007, he received the Literature Fellowship in Poetry from the National Endowment for the Arts. He has been published in American poetry journals including Poetry, The New Republic, Paris Review, Kenyon Review, Southern Review, Orion, and JuxtaProse and the 2005 Pushcart Prize Anthology. His writing has been described as embodying a "quaintly romantic notion that mortality and love and soul are the abiding themes of life and art."

Larsen is married to painter Jacqui Larsen.

== Collections ==
- Erasable Walls (1998)
- In All Their Animal Brilliance (2005)
- Backyard Alchemy (2009)
- Genius Loci (2013)
- What the Body Knows (2018)
- Making a Kingdom of It (2024)

== See also ==
- Fire in the Pasture
- Harvest: Contemporary Mormon Poems
