= Arthur Henry King =

Mormon academic and scholar

- Born: 20 February 1910
- Died: 15 January 2000 (aged 89)
- Occupation: Scholar

Arthur Henry King (20 February 1910 – 15 January 2000), also found as Arthur H. King, was a British poet, writer and academic.

== Life ==
King was educated at the University of Cambridge, England, and Lund University, Sweden, and held a Doctor of Literature in stylistics. He served as Assistant Director-General in charge of Education in England. Beginning in 1943, he was an official in the British Council, serving in Europe, Persia, and Pakistan.

In 1966, after his first wife died, King married his second cousin, Patricia, a member of The Church of Jesus Christ of Latter-day Saints. He later also converted to the faith. Moving to the United States, King taught English at Brigham Young University, in Provo, Utah, for several years from 1971 and served as an associate director of the university's Honors Program.

King had an international reputation as a poet, author and lecturer. He produced works on sixteenth and seventeenth century literature and English as a foreign language. King asserted that poet Andrew Marvell was a principal influence on his work, but acknowledged the influence of T. S. Eliot and Yeats.

During his academic tenure in Utah, King contributed articles to BYU Studies and Dialogue: A Journal of Mormon Thought, as well as magazines published by the Church of Jesus Christ of Latter-day Saints.

From 1986 to 1988 King served as president of the London England Temple of The Church of Jesus Christ of Latter-day Saints.

== Publications ==
=== Poetry ===
- 2001 Poetry Collection, posthumous, 2001.
- Cast on the Lord 1996.
- Hymn: Every Kindred, Tongue, and People 1996.
- Conversion: Poems of the Religious Life, 1963–1994.
- Death is the Frame of Love 1988.
- Before a Journey 1987.
- Snowdrops at Ditchly Park 1987.
- Isis Egypt-Bound 1986.
- Nature and the Bourgeois Poet: A Poem 1986.
- Entitlement, a poem 1985.
- President Kimball at Mestre, a poem 1985.
- Epithalamion 1978.
- Beyond our Works and Days 1977.
- Be Still 1976.
- Hebrews 11: Strangers and Pilgrims 1976.
- Is It the Tree? 1974.
- On This Gray and Silver Day 1974.
- September the First 1969 and 1974.
- They Seek a Country 1974.
- Three Poems 1974.
- First Snow 1973.
- A Prophet is Dead; A Prophet Lives 1973.
- September on Campus 1973.
- I Will Make Thee a Terror to Thyself 1972.
- Latter Days (Monday, Aug. 4, 1969) 1971.
- Winter Solstice 1971.
- Hot Weather in Tucson 1969.
- The Right Size 1969.
- Visit to a Cathedral After a Trip Around the World 1969.

=== Essays and criticism ===
- Arm the Children: Faith’s Response to a Violent World with C. Terry Warner, 1998.
- Joseph Smith as a Writer 1986.
- The Abundance of the Heart 1986.
- The Child Is Father of the Man 1976.
- Final Address to the British Council 1975.
- Some Notes on Art and Morality 1970.
