= Dialogue: A Journal of Mormon Thought =

- Discipline: Mormon studies
- Language: English
- Edited by: Taylor G. Petrey

Publication details
- History: 1966-present
- Publisher: University of Illinois Press for the Dialogue Foundation (United States)
- Frequency: Quarterly

Standard abbreviations
- ISO 4: Dialogue (Salt Lake City)

Indexing
- ISSN: 0012-2157 (print); 1554-9399 (web)
- OCLC no.: 197923057

Links
- Journal homepage

Dialogue: A Journal of Mormon Thought is an independent quarterly journal that addresses a wide range of issues on Mormonism and the Latter Day Saint Movement.

The journal publishes peer-reviewed academic articles on subjects such as anthropology, sociology, theology, history, and science. The journal also publishes fiction, poetry, and graphic arts. Dialogue authors regularly include both members of the Mormon community and non-Mormon scholars interested in Mormon studies. Douglas Davies and Jan Shipps are some of the non-Mormon academics that publish in Dialogue. Examples of Mormon authors are Eugene England, Richard Bushman, Claudia Bushman, Gregory Prince, and Mary Lythgoe Bradford.

== History ==
Dialogue: A Journal of Mormon Thought, is the oldest independent journal in Mormon studies. Dialogue was originally the creation of a group of young Mormon scholars at Stanford University led by Eugene England, and G. Wesley Johnson. Dialogue's original offices were located at Stanford. Brent Rushforth aided in Dialogue's initiation.

The first issue appeared in the spring of 1966, and during its first few years the editorial board and staff came to include many notables in the subsequent history of the Church of Jesus Christ of Latter-day Saints, such as Richard Bushman, Chase Peterson, Stanford Cazier, Dallin H. Oaks, Cherry Silver, Karen Rosenbaum, and Laurel Thatcher Ulrich. Dialogue is known for publishing groundbreaking articles from respected Mormon scholars and writers such as Armand Mauss, Hugh Nibley, Lester Bush, and D. Michael Quinn. Two key sponsors and advisors from the beginning were Lowell L. Bennion, of the LDS Institute at the University of Utah, and Leonard J. Arrington, later the official historian of the LDS Church. Dialogue has nevertheless remained independent of church auspices over the years because of its readers and donors.

The founding and subsequent editorial boards have been composed mainly of scholars and lay writers who are participating members of the LDS Church. Dialogue has been the main venue over the years for the publication of articles on some of the most difficult and controversial issues in LDS history and doctrine, including the problems of race ethnicity (see Blacks and Mormonism), women's roles, religion and politics, the history of polygamy (see Joseph Smith, Jr. and Polygamy), Mormons and Masonry, the Book of Mormon, the career of Joseph Smith, and many other potentially difficult issues. Dialogue has maintained an editorial independence that has established it as the premier scholarly journal in Mormon studies, an academic field at several universities.

The Mormon History Association ("MHA") was founded in 1966, and for the first 6–7 years of its existence, MHA members published their Mormon-related studies principally in Dialogue. MHA then founded the Journal of Mormon History. Since then, Dialogue and The Journal of Mormon History, along with BYU Studies Quarterly have been some of the main venues for historical studies of Mormonism. Both BYU Studies Quarterly and Sunstone Magazine are periodicals that, like Dialogue, contain articles that range widely across the field of Mormon studies.

In February 2019, Dialogue announced that it was making all of its past and current content available to everyone for free on a new web page. The journal switched from a subscription to a donation system.

== List of editors ==
Name	Term	Notes
Eugene England and G. Wesley Johnson	1966–1970	Based in Stanford
Robert A. Rees	1970–1976	Based in Los Angeles
Mary Lythgoe Bradford	1977–1982	Based in Virginia
Linda King Newell and L. Jackson Newell	1982–1986	Husband and wife team, based in Salt Lake City
F. Ross Peterson and Mary Kay Peterson	1987–1992	
Martha Sonntag Bradley and Allen D. Roberts	1993–1998	
Neal Chandler and Rebecca Worthen Chandler	1999–2003	Based in Shaker Heights, Ohio
Karen Marguerite Moloney	2004	Only for spring issue
Levi S. Peterson	2004–2008	English professor at Weber State, biographer, novelist
Kristine Haglund	2009–2015	
Boyd Jay Petersen	2016–2019	Mormon studies program coordinator at UVU
Taylor Petrey	2019–	Associate Professor of Religion at Kalamazoo College

== Web version ==
In 2005 Dialogue dipped its toe into the Mormon blogosphere with several of its editorial and board members participating as long-term guest contributors to the Mormon blog By Common Consent. Then in early 2006 Dialogue introduced "Dialogue Paperless" at Dialoguejournal.com, with sections for ePapers, News, Letters, and Book Reviews. The "e-Papers" section intended to "supplement the printed journal by housing digital documents that qualify as papers ... complete pieces, duly refereed and edited and hitherto unpublished." Early e-Papers included D. Michael Quinn's "Joseph Smith's Experience of a Methodist "Camp-Meeting" in 1820," and articles by other authors comprising a "Critique and Defense of Chiasmus in the Book of Mormon."

== Subscriber survey ==
In 2005, Dialogue received 1,332 responses to a subscriber survey. Dialogue reports the following responses:

- The geographic location of respondents was: Utah (33%), California (17%), other Western states—Rockies to the Coast (19%), the Northeast (10-12%), elsewhere (20%). Less than 1% lived outside the U.S., though there is some indication that the availability of online subscriptions may be changing the level of international readership.
- The terminal education degree of respondents was: doctoral degree (40%), Master's (31%), Bachelor's degree (21%), and no degree (7%).
- 66% of respondents attend worship service every week, and another 12% attend "most weeks" (total 78%). 59% of today's readers are returned missionaries.
- Respondents subscribe to or regularly read the following other Mormon-related publications: BYU Studies (29%), Ensign (66%), FARMS Review of Books (13%), John Whitmer Historical Association Journal (9%), Irreantum, the AML journal (10%), Journal of Book of Mormon Studies (17%), Journal of Mormon History (25%), Sunstone (68%), and Utah Historical Quarterly (13%).
- 90% of respondents are members of the LDS Church. Around 6% of respondents described themselves as having left the LDS Church and most of these have affiliated with other denominations.
- 81% of respondents either "strongly" (32%) or "somewhat" (49%) agreed that Dialogue contributes to their personal spiritual or religious enrichment.
- 84% of respondents viewed the Book of Mormon as "authentic in any sense." The way in which the Book of Mormon was viewed as authentic was: Literal Historical Record (almost 40%) Theology & Moral Teaching Authentic, Historicity Doubtful (24%) Moral Teachings Sound, Historicity & Divine Origin Doubtful (12%), 19th Century Literary Product (14%).
- Two-thirds (68%) of respondents find Dialogue's "current content and editorial tone" to be predominantly "objective and "independent," 9% find it to be "hypercritical and negative," 8% find the content/tone to be "bland, uncritical," and 13% reported that it "depends on the subject."

== Digital archive ==
In collaboration with the University of Utah's J. Willard Marriott Library, in 2004 the archive of past Dialogue issues (1966 to date) was digitally scanned. The library's Special Collections now hosts the digital archive in pdf and text-searchable form. This digital collection is also mirrored on the Dialogue website. At the 2005 annual conference of the Association for Mormon Letters ("AML"), the AML presented a "Special Award in Mormon Literary Studies" with this citation:

Since its inception in 1966, Dialogue: A Journal of Mormon Thought has served as a central point for academic studies of Mormonism. Dialogue has promoted Mormon arts and letters by publishing hundreds of poems, short stories, personal essays, and articles of criticism. However, like many periodicals, Dialogue's treasures have generally remained only as accessible as the most recent issue or two. ... Nearly 40 years of back issues-the entire run of this seminal periodical for Mormon studies-have now been completely digitized and made accessible to the public free of charge ... This collection would not be as valuable or secure for future generations were it not hosted by an academic institution committed to maintaining the accessibility and permanence of this collection. The Association for Mormon Letters commends the J. Willard Marriott Library of the University of Utah for providing a permanent home to this vital digital collection, and by extension, for the university's commitment to the sustained and critical assessment of Mormon arts and letters.

== See also ==
- Bloggernacle
- List of theological journals
- List of Latter Day Saint periodicals
