= Emma Lou Thayne =

American poet

Emma Lou Warner Thayne (October 22, 1924 – December 6, 2014) was a poet and novelist. She was a member of the Church of Jesus Christ of Latter-day Saints and counted as one of the 75 most significant Mormon poets.

Thayne graduated from the University of Utah in 1945. She would later return there to coach tennis and teach English. In the late 1960s, she completed a master's degree at the University of Utah. She was on the faculty over 30 years. In 1949, she married Mel Thayne; they became the parents of five daughters.

Although Thayne worked primarily as a poet, she also wrote novels. Her first novel was Never Past the Gate, which was inspired by her summers growing up in Mount Aire Canyon. Thayne also served on the board of directors for Deseret News. She was also a contributor to such magazines as Network, a woman's magazine based in Salt Lake City, Exponent II and Utah Holiday. At age 90, she died in Salt Lake City on December 6, 2014.

Thayne wrote the words to the hymn "Where Can I Turn for Peace?".

== Awards ==
- Distinguished Alumna, University of Utah
- David O. McKay Humanities Award, Brigham Young University
- Chamber of Commerce Honors in the Arts Award
- Gandhi Peace Award, 2013

Salt Lake Community college named the Emma Lou Thayne Center for Service Learning after Thayne to honor her.

== Works ==
- Spaces in the Sage (1971) — poetry collection
- On Slim Unaccountable Bones: Poems (1974) — novel
- Never Past the Gate (1975) — novel
- With Love, Mother (1975) — poetry collection
- A Woman's Place (1977) — novel
- Until Another Day for Butterflies (1978) — poetry collection
- Once in Israel (1980) — poetry collection
- How Much for the Earth? A Suite of Poems: About Time for Considering (1983) — poetry collection
- "Where Can I Turn For Peace?" (1985) hymn
- Things Happen: Poems of Survival (1991) — poetry collection
- Hope and Recovery: A Mother-Daughter Story About Anorexis Nervosa, Bulimia, and Manic Depression (1992)
- Clarice Short: Earthy Academic (1994) — biography/memoir
- All God's Critters Got A Place in the Choir (1995) — personal essay collection with Laurel Thatcher Ulrich
- "The Place of Knowing" (2011) — personal memoir/autobiography
