= Eugene England =

American historian (1933–2001)

- Born: George Eugene England, Jr. 22 July 1933; Logan, Utah, U.S.
- Died: 17 August 2001 (aged 68)
- Education: Stanford University (Ph.D.)
- Occupations: Professor (Brigham Young University); Author, poet and essayist Co-founder: Dialogue: A Journal of Mormon Thought (1966); the Association for Mormon Letters (1976)

George Eugene England Jr. (22 July 1933 – 17 August 2001), usually credited as Eugene England, was a Latter-day Saint writer, teacher, and scholar. He founded Dialogue: A Journal of Mormon Thought, the oldest independent journal in Mormon Studies, with G. Wesley Johnson, Paul G. Salisbury, Joseph H. Jeppson, and Frances Menlove in 1966, and cofounded the Association for Mormon Letters in 1976. He is also widely known in the Church of Jesus Christ of Latter-day Saints (LDS Church) for his many essays about Mormon culture and thought. From 1977 to 1998, England taught Mormon Literature at Brigham Young University. England described the ideal modern Mormon scholar as "critical and innovative as his gifts from God require but conscious of and loyal to his own unique heritage and nurturing community and thus able to exercise those gifts without harm to others or himself."

== Biography ==
England was born 22 July 1933 in Logan, Utah to George Eugene England and Dora Rose Hartvigsen England. He grew up in Downey, Idaho, where his father owned a wheat farm. At age 20, he married the former Charlotte Hawkins, with whom he was soon called to serve an LDS mission to Samoa.

After serving as a captain in the U.S. Air Force, England entered graduate school at Stanford University, where he was influenced by both the 1960s-era campus movement and the Church of Jesus Christ of Latter-day Saints as an active member and a leader in his student ward. While at Stanford, England met Wesley Johnson and together the two men conceived of and announced the formation of an academic journal on Mormon culture, Dialogue: A Journal of Mormon Thought.

Leaving Stanford, England taught at St. Olaf College in Minnesota, while completing work on his Ph.D., awarded in 1974. But he was forced to leave when some of his students expressed interest in Mormonism and their parents complained. He then taught at the Institute of Religion of the Church of Jesus Christ of Latter-day Saints adjacent to the University of Utah for two years, before receiving a professorship at Brigham Young University.

At BYU, England was able to teach classes in Mormon literature and in 1976 he helped found the Association for Mormon Letters in order to raise the visibility of the study of Mormon literature. He also explored religious themes in important literary works. During his years at BYU England was at his most prolific, writing books of essays such as Dialogues with Myself and "Why the Church Is as True as the Gospel," poetry, a biography and numerous articles.

In 1980 England initiated an exchange of letters with Apostle Bruce R. McConkie on the subject of the perfection vs. the progression of God and soliciting to be corrected if Elder McConkie saw the need. In 1981 England received a letter from McConkie in response, chastising him for publicly advocating the view that God continues to learn new things. According to historian Claudia Bushman, "the McConkie-England disagreement revealed the division between theological conservatives and liberals within the believing camp and, in a larger sense, the tensions between authoritarian control versus free expression."

In the last decade of his life, England felt increasingly under fire for his work. He was forced to retire from BYU in 1998, at age 65. He was then offered the position of writer in residence at Utah Valley State College in Orem, Utah. There he started the Center for the Study of Mormon Culture, as part of the college's religious studies program. Before England could fully develop the center, he suffered a debilitating case of brain cancer. Despite an operation that removed two golf-ball sized cysts and a portion of a tumor, he died on 17 August 2001.

Among other positions held in the LDS Church at various times England served as a bishop twice.

== Works ==
- A Teacher's Faith and Values (edited with Erling Jorstad). St. Olaf College, 1973
- Brother Brigham. Bookcraft, 1980. ISBN 0-88494-394-1
- Dialogues With Myself. Orion Books (a division of Signature Books), 1984. ISBN 0-941214-21-4 "Full text"
- Why the Church Is As True As the Gospel. Bookcraft, 1986; Tabernacle Books, 1999; Mormon Arts & Letters, 2007. ISBN 0-85051-101-1
- The Best of Lowell L. Bennion: Selected Writings, 1928-1988 (edited with Lowell Lindsay Bennion). Deseret Book, 1988. ISBN 0-87579-184-0
- Converted to Christ Through the Book of Mormon. Deseret Book, 1989. ISBN 0-87579-268-5
- Harvest: Contemporary Mormon Poems (edited with Dennis Clark). Signature Books, 1989. ISBN 0-941214-80-X
- Beyond Romanticism: Tuckerman's Life and Poetry. State University of New York Press, 1991. ISBN 0-7914-0791-8
- Bright Angels & Familiars: Contemporary Mormon Stories (edited). Signature Books, 1992. ISBN 1-56085-026-4
- The Quality of Mercy: Personal Essays on Mormon Experience. Bookcraft, 1992. ISBN 0-88494-830-7
- An Open World: Essays on Leslie Norris (edited with Peter Makuck). Camden House, 1994. ISBN 1-879751-82-8
- Making Peace: Personal Essays. Signature Books, 1995. ISBN 1-56085-069-8
- Tending the Garden: Essays on Mormon Literature (edited with Lavina Fielding Anderson). Signature Books, 1996. ISBN 1-56085-019-1
- Proving Contraries: A Collection of Writings in Honor of Eugene England. Signature Books, 2005. ISBN 1-56085-190-2
- Eugene England: Essays on Values in Literature (edited by C. Jay Fox, Steven C. Walker, Jesse S. Crisler). Center for the Study of Christian Values in Literature, Brigham Young University, 2006. ISBN 0-939555-08-5
