= Association for Mormon Letters =

Non-profit literary organization

The Association for Mormon Letters (AML) is a nonprofit organization founded in 1976 to "foster scholarly and creative work in Mormon letters and to promote fellowship among scholars and writers of Mormon literature." Other stated purposes have included promoting the "production and study of Mormon literature" and the encouragement of quality writing "by, for, and about Mormons." The broadness of this definition of LDS literature has led the AML to focus on a wide variety of work that has sometimes been neglected in the Mormon community. It publishes criticism on such writing, hosts an annual conference, and offers awards to works of fiction, poetry, essay, criticism, drama, film, and other genres. It published the literary journal Irreantum from 1999 to 2013 and currently publishes an online-only version of the journal, which began in 2018. The AML's blog, Dawning of a Brighter Day, launched in 2009. As of 2012, the association also promotes LDS literature through the use of social media. The AML has been described as an "influential proponent of Mormon literary fiction."

== Founding ==
A meeting held in the Church’s Historical Department on April 20, 1976 led to the organization of the association. Lavina Fielding Anderson described the founding of the organization in this way:

"[The] Association for Mormon letters [was] founded with the specific purpose of fostering literary criticism. Its genesis lay in a meeting which Maureen Ursenbach Beecher called among a group of friends in the fall of 1976 to discuss the quality and availability of Mormon personal narratives . . . Eugene England and I were among the eight or ten people who came. Gene tossed out the question, “How could we go about organizing a group focused on the criticism of Mormon literature?” . . . We dutifully shifted, on the spot, from academics to activity. Maureen chaired [the] steering committee, formally organized the Association for Mormon letters, and persuaded us that the name should be 'for Mormon letters,' not 'of Mormon letters.'"

A "steering committee" consisting of Beecher, Fielding, Neal E. Lambert, Clifton Jolley, and Steven Sondrup finalized the plans for the organization on April 27. They also planned for the first symposium of the AML to be held that October, with printed invitations and a call for papers carrying the message through the mail. The First Presidency of the Church of Jesus Christ of Latter-day Saints - then consisting of Spencer W. Kimball, N. Eldon Tanner, and Marion G. Romney - met with Leonard J. Arrington to discuss the creation of the AML. They approved of its creation, so long as it would be made clear that it was unaffiliated with the Church itself. The Association for Mormon Letters was officially established on October 4, 1976, at the Hotel Utah. Its constitution instituted an annual meeting of the association and focused its efforts on "encouraging and recognizing good writing and informative scholarship as well as fostering a better appreciation for what has already been written by and about Mormons." It also provided for an elected president to serve a one-year term, succeeded by a president-elect/vice president the next year. Submissions were requested for the second conference and a newsletter would be published. Beecher served as the association's first president, with Lambert as the first vice president.

The early leadership of the organization participated in editing three anthologies, each published by Signature Books: Harvest: Contemporary Mormon Poems, edited by Eugene England and Dennis Clark (1989), the short story collection Bright Angels and Familiars: Contemporary Mormon Stories, edited by Eugene England (1992), and the literary criticism collection Tending the Garden: Essays on Mormon Literature, edited by Eugene England and Lavina Fielding Anderson (1996).

== Awards ==
Since its third annual conference, the AML has given awards to LDS literature in various categories, often in "fiction, poetry, essay, and criticism." Winners are selected by a jury. Starting in 1998, the AML recognized "the best unpublished Mormon novel." This has since developed into the Marilyn Brown Novel Award. The award is now presented by Utah Valley University's English Department. The association changes the categories as it sees fit. For example, in 1989 Signature Books was awarded Special Recognition for "providing a much-needed venue for more literary sorts of LDS publishing." And in 2005, the association presented the University of Utah's J. Willard Marriott Library with a Mormon Literary Studies award for its reserves of Dialogue: A Journal of Mormon Thought. Since 2014, the AML has released a list of finalists prior to announcing the award winners at its annual conference.

== Conferences ==
The association holds an annual conference, usually at various universities in Utah during the months of February or March. The first of such meetings was held at the Hotel Utah in 1976. Historian Leonard J. Arrington and academic Arthur Henry King were among the presenters. The first AML Awards were given at the third annual meeting, a tradition that continues to this day. The symposiums also involve the announcement and sustaining of new leaders of the association. Programs are available online for every conference held since 1976. The 2020 AML conference was cancelled and replaced by a recorded virtual event held on May 2, in which the 2019 AML Award winners were announced.

== Publications ==
=== AML Newsletter ===
From 1977 to 1998, the Association for Mormon Letters published a quarterly newsletter. Its cost was included in the organization's membership dues. Book reviews and news from the AML were included. Steven Sondrup and Levi Peterson were its editors. Irreantum took its place in March 1999.

=== AML-List ===
From 1995 to 2011 the AML sponsored AML-List, an e-mail list for the discussion of LDS literature. Its founder and moderator was Benson Y. Parkinson. Weber State University's English Department was also a sponsor. List subscribers posted reviews of more than a thousand LDS books, films, and other artistic works, which are archived in the association's review database. Subscribers also asked questions about various works and discussed issues pertaining to LDS literature. According to Chris Bigelow, AML-List possessed "the right balance of academics with more popular, commercial, and down-to-earth concerns" and received an average of 30 posts per day. The forum also helped the membership numbers of the Association for Mormon Letters increase.

=== Irreantum ===
Irreantum, the AML's literary journal, was founded in 1999 by Chris Bigelow and Benson Parkinson. According to Irreantum's current website, "the name comes from a Book of Mormon term meaning 'many waters'" and was meant to inspire a feeling of inclusivity pertaining to the wide variety of works the journal would publish. Bigelow has said that Irreantum was "inspired by AML-List." It featured selections of LDS literature and reviews and sought to publish "the best in contemporary Mormon poetry, essays, stories, and criticism." A subscription cost $12 a year, and was free for AML members. Both submissions and communications between the editors were conducted over e-mail. The staff consisted of volunteers only. Irreantum was published quarterly. The association held an annual Irreantum Fiction Contest; three winners were chosen, and their works were published in the journal. Submissions "were judged blind" and were required to somehow convey the experience of being a member of the Church of Jesus Christ of Latter-day Saints. A minimum of three new writers were featured in the publication each year. Though it published works "by, for, and about Mormons," Irreantum sought to be considered a literary, humanities-based journal, rather than a religious publication. It was advertised as "the only magazine devoted to Mormon literature." It went on hiatus in 2013. Five years later, in 2018, Irreantum was again published as an online magazine. Previous issues are available via Irreantum's online archives. Current issues are published only online, and multiple people rotate as editors.

=== Dawning of a Brighter Day ===
In 2009 the AML launched its blog, entitled Dawning of a Brighter Day. The title was inspired by an article written by Eugene England in 1983: "The Dawning of a Brighter Day: Mormon Literature after 150 Years." The blog seeks to facilitate the online presence of the discussion of LDS literature and, according to Michael Austin, is "a high-traffic website with hundreds of participants."
