= Brewster Ghiselin =

American writer (1903–2002)

Brewster Ghiselin (June 13, 1903 – June 11, 2002) was an American poet and academic.

Ghiselin was born in Webster Groves, Missouri, a suburb of St. Louis. The family home is at 29 Jefferson Road, now designated as a historic landmark. At the age of sixteen, he moved to California, where he lived until 1934. He lived just north of San Francisco, graduating from Tamalpais High School in 1922.

After high school, He enrolled at University of California, Berkeley. While there, he would commute two hours by train and ferry. Ghiselin thought he wanted to be a painter, but was unhappy with his art teachers, dropping out the middle of his freshman year. He went to work for the San Anselmo Herald and the San Francisco Bulletin. Looking for something more than the "stream of daily news", he enrolled at UCLA, again taking up art.

Achieving an M.A. in English, he went on to Oxford University, for further study. While at Oxford, he sought out D. H. Lawrence, finding him at the hotel Beau Rivage, in France. After his meeting with Lawrence, he wrote a great deal of poetry that remained unpublished for six or seven years.

Then in 1929 he became a member of the English faculty at the University of Utah, where he taught English. Finding the intellectual climate in Utah rather "chilling", he secured a job at Berkeley, where he and his wife Olive lived.

In 1933 during the depression, he was out of a job. His mother had died in Laguna Beach, facilitating a move to her home. Together with scholar, Alfred Young Fisher, husband of M. F. K. Fisher, they organized the "Emergency Education Program" earning $27.00 a month teaching night classes at the local High School.

He was lured back to the University of Utah where he began teaching a course, in 1941, called "The Creative Process". This was the beginning of the making of the Utah Writer's Conference. He was responsible for creating the Utah Writer's Conference in 1947, where he remained its director until 1966.

He published Against the Circle in 1946. The poem "Rattlesnake" from this book of poems is mentioned in Richard Hugo's Triggering Town, a book of lectures and essays on the writing of poetry. In 1970, he published the book Country of the Minotaur, a compilation of many of his poems.

In 1952, Ghiselin edited The Creative Process, a symposium of the writings of some thirty-eight men and women, including Katherine Anne Porter, Albert Einstein, Vincent van Gogh, D. H. Lawrence, etc., on the creative process.
