= List of Mormon studies scholars =

Individuals from a variety of cultural or philosophical standpoints produced prolific Mormon-themed research, scholarship, or their popularization, in an era now past. Then, beginning in the decade of the 2000s, Mormon studies finally came into its own as an independent field of study when the sub-discipline became featured by then at a few academic institutions in the Western United States.

Some of the individuals with recognized expertise in the field are listed below. In consideration of space, members of Latter Day Saint movement denominations' overall leadership are not included (Dallin H. Oaks is listed for work he published prior his becoming a member of the LDS Church's Quorum of the Twelve).

== Selected list of past scholars ==
=== 19th-century compilers of Mormon histories or essays ===
- Thomas Bullock (1816–1885)
- William Clayton (1814–1879)
- Appleton Milo Harmon (1820–1877)
- Edward Tullidge (1829–1894)
- L. John Nuttall (1834–1905)
- Edward H. Anderson (1858–1928) — Journalist. Biographer of Brigham Young
- Nephi Anderson (1865–1923) — Mormon author of fiction and non-fiction

=== Opening "modern," 20th-century field ===
- Andrew Jenson (1850–1941) — Assistant Church Historian of the LDS Church
- B. H. Roberts (1857–1933) — Assistant Church Historian of the LDS Church 1902–1933. Made first attempts to shift from apologetics to a professional historical approach.
- John Henry Evans (1872–1947): Latter-day Saints University — Biographer, various early LDS leaders
- LeRoy R. Hafen (1893–1985): University of Denver; BYU
- Bernard DeVoto (1897–1955): Northwestern; Harvard — Preeminent writer-historian of the American West sometimes writing on Mormon subjects
- Juanita Brooks (1898–1989) — Independent. Also served as a dean at Dixie Junior College
- Paul Dayton Bailey (1906–1987) — Journalist. Author of histories of about Mormon pioneers
- Samuel W. Taylor (1907–1997) — Novelist and screenwriter who authored the Mormon-themed humorous novel Heaven Knows Why! in 1948
- Lowell L. Bennion (1908–1996): Salt Lake City's LDS Institute of Religion — Sociology of religion. Ecumenical outreach, practical philosophy
- Wallace Stegner (1909–1993): University of Wisconsin–Madison; Harvard — Writer-historian called "The Dean of Western Writers," sometimes writing on Mormon topics
- Ivan J. Barrett (1910–1999): BYU
- Hugh Nibley (1910–2005): BYU — Known as the father of LDS Apologetics
- W. Cleon Skousen (1913–2006) — BYU religion professor, 1967–1978. Prolific popularizer among LDS of its theology. (Also an influential, conservative American Constitutionalist and faith-based political theorist)
- Dale Morgan (1914–1971) — Influential independent Utah historian
- Fawn M. Brodie (1915–1981) — Critical, psychobiographer of Joseph Smith. Became UCLA professor
- Leonard J. Arrington (1917–1999): Utah State Agricultural College; BYU; LDS Church Historian, 1972–1982 — Economist, known as the "Dean of Mormon History" and "the Father of Mormon History."
- Richard D. Poll (1918–1994): BYU; Western Illinois University
- Paul R. Cheesman (1921–1991): BYU — Archeologist
- Stanley B. Kimball (1926–2003): Southern Illinois University — Scholar of Eastern European history and also of Utah pioneer history
- Truman G. Madsen (1926–2009): BYU — Homiletic biographer of Joseph Smith, Jr.
- Wesley P. Walters (1926–1990): Critical, researcher into early origins of the Latter Day Saint movement
- Harold Schindler (1929–1998) — Utah journalist. Biographer of Orrin Porter Rockwell
- Carlfred Broderick (1932–1999): University of Southern California — Psychologist, family therapist and popular author. Also wrote a handful of pieces in publications intended for an LDS audience
- Helen Andelin (1932–2006): LDS Relief Society — Popular author. Studied home economics at BYU. Taught women's classes in her local LDS Church, expanding materials prepared for this purpose into Fascinating Womanhood (1963)
- Eugene England (1933–2001): BYU — Founder of Dialogue: A Journal of Mormon Thought
- Valeen Tippetts Avery (1936–2006): Northern Arizona University — Historian specializing in women's studies. Biographer of Emma Hale Smith
- Jerald Tanner (1938–2006) — Independent, evangelical pamphleteer and provocateur who, with his wife Sandra (born 1941), documented such things as what he believed to be historical LDS doctrinal changes
- William Robert Wright (1935–2012): Lawyer; biographer of David O. McKay
- Stanford Cazier (1930–2013): California State University, Chico; Utah State University
- Marvin S. Hill (1928–2016): BYU; Yale
- Robert V. Remini (1921–2013): University of Illinois at Chicago — Biographer of a number of notable Americans, including Joseph Smith, Jr.

== Selected list of current scholars ==
=== Of preeminence ===
- Thomas G. Alexander: BYU professor emeritus — Lemuel Hardison Redd, Jr. Professor of Western History
- James B. Allen: BYU professor emeritus; Assistant (LDS) Church Historian — Co-founder, Mormon History Association
- Philip Barlow: associate director of the Neal A. Maxwell Institute for Religious Scholarship
- Richard Bushman: Columbia professor emeritus; retired director of Mormon studies at Claremont Graduate University
- Douglas J. Davies: Professor; University of Durham
- Ron Esplin: BYU — former director of the Joseph Fielding Smith Institute for Latter-day Saint History; LDS Church History Library — Managing editor of The Joseph Smith Papers project
- Kathleen Flake: University of Virginia — Richard L. Bushman Professor in Mormon Studies; Vanderbilt — Associate Professor or American Religious History
- Terryl Givens: University of Richmond — Bostwick Professor of English
- Marlin K. Jensen: previous LDS Church Historian/Recorder
- Patrick Q. Mason: Utah State University — Leonard J. Arrington Chair of Mormon History and Culture
- Dean L. May: University of Utah — Professor of American History, Editor of the Journal of Mormon History (1982–1985), President of Mormon History Association (2002)
- Armand Mauss: Washington State University — professor emeritus; Claremont Graduate University — visiting scholar
- D. Michael Quinn: Former researcher in Church Historical Department; BYU; after 1988, independent
- Jan Shipps: Indiana University – Purdue University Indianapolis — retired in 1995; Polis Center (Indiana University) — research associate
- Ronald W. Walker: BYU professor emeritus; after 2012, independent

=== By interdisciplines ===
==== International Mormonism ====
- R. Lanier Britsch: BYU — retired Historian of LDS missionary work, especially in the South Pacific

==== English professors; journalists ====
- Will Bagley: Independent historian of Utah history
- Richard Dutcher: Filmmaker on predominantly LDS topics
- John C. Hamer: Independent historian — Journal editor; Co-author, books about Community of Christ history and about LDS movement schisms; Blogger
- William P. MacKinnon: Independent historian — Businessman. Historian of the Utah War
- Adam S. Miller: Collin College — Writer of religious criticism and interpretation and also of LDS lay theology
- Boyd Jay Petersen: BYU — Biographer of Hugh Nibley; Utah Valley University — Literature of the Sacred and Mormon Literature professor; editor of Dialogue: A Journal of Mormon Thought starting 2016; past president of the Association for Mormon Letters
- Levi S. Peterson: Weber State University — English professor emeritus; novelist and memoirist; biographer of Juanita Brooks; editor of Dialogue (2004–2008)
- Gregory A. Prince: Independent historian — medical pathologist; biographer of David O. McKay
- Robert A. Rees: University of California, Los Angeles — retired professor; University of California, Santa Cruz — retired Fulbright professor; Graduate Theological Union in Berkeley — visiting professor
- Jana Riess: Religion reporter and publishing house editor
- Peggy Fletcher Stack: Religion reporter at the Salt Lake Tribune since 1991
- Jonathan A. Stapley: Independent historian — chemist and businessman
- Margaret Blair Young: BYU — Mormon African American history

==== Philosophers ====
- David L. Paulsen: BYU — professor of philosophy; founding board member of the Society for Mormon Philosophy and Theology
- Kelli D. Potter: UVU — professor of philosophy; founding board member of the Society for Mormon Philosophy and Theology; founding editor of Element: The Journal for the Society for Mormon Philosophy and Theology, 2000–2002.

==== Trained historians ====
- Mark Ashurst-McGee: BYU; LDS Church History Department
- Alexander L. Baugh: BYU — professor in Church History department; board member of the Mormon History Association
- John L. Brooke: Ohio State University — director of the Center for Historical Research; author of The Refiner's Fire: The Making of Mormon Cosmology, 1644-1844
- Richard O. Cowan: BYU — professor of Church history and doctrine
- Reed C. Durham: LDS Institutes of Religion
- Scott H. Faulring: BYU — research historian with the Joseph Fielding Smith Institute for Church History
- Arnold K. Garr: BYU — professor emeritus of Church history and doctrine; lead editor, Encyclopedia of Latter-day Saint History (2000)
- Matthew Grow: Church History Department
- William G. Hartley: LDS Church History Department; BYU — previous research historian for the Joseph Fielding Smith Institute for Church History
- Andrew H. Hedges: BYU — co-editor of The Joseph Smith Papers and previous associate professor of Church history and doctrine
- Daniel Walker Howe: Oxford — Professor of America History Emeritus; University of California, Los Angeles — Professor of History Emeritus; author of What Hath God Wrought: the Transformation of America, 1815–1848 (2007)
- Richard L. Jensen: BYU; LDS Church History Department — 19th-century European Mormonism; LDS converts' immigration to U.S.
- Dean C. Jessee: LDS Church History Department; BYU — worked at the Joseph Fielding Smith Institute for Latter-day Saint History; general editor of The Joseph Smith Papers
- Glen M. Leonard: BYU; Utah State University
- L. Jackson Newell: University of Utah — Professor Emeritus of Educational Leadership and Policy; Deep Springs College — President Emeritus
- Richard E. Turley Jr.: Assistant Church Historian of the LDS Church
- Grant Underwood: BYU — professor of history
- Dan Vogel: Independent historian — Biographer of Joseph Smith, Jr.

==== Specialists in women's studies ====
- Lavina Fielding Anderson: Independent historian — Feminist. Among the September Six, scholars involved in a 1993 LDS controversy
- Claudia Lauper Bushman: Columbia — professor American Studies emerita; Claremont Graduate University — Mormon studies program from 2008 to 2011; Historian
- Kathryn M. Daynes: BYU — assistant professor in the Department of History; published on polygamy
- Jill Mulvay Derr: retired senior research historian for the Church History Department.
- Kristine Haglund — Mormon-themed blogger. Editor of Dialogue: A Journal of Mormon Thought (2009–2015)
- Carol Cornwall Madsen: BYU — emerita research historian with the Joseph Fielding Smith Institute for Church history and associate director of Women's Research Institute
- Laurel Thatcher Ulrich: Harvard; Preeminent historian of early American women's history. Also, occasional essayist on the topic of LDS feminism

==== Other specialists ====
- David H. Bailey: Lawrence Berkeley National Laboratory — Mathematician. Editor, Science Meets Religion website
- Robert H. Briggs: Lawyer. Violence in pioneer Utah
- John E. Clark: BYU — Archaeologist. Book of Mormon studies
- Todd M. Compton: Independent historian — Trained classicist
- James E. Faulconer: BYU — Department of Philosophy and held BYU's Richard L. Evans Chair of Religious Understanding
- Sherman L. Fleek, leading historian of LDS military studies; former command historian at U.S. Military Academy
- Avraham Gileadi: BYU; after 1993, independent — Hebraist. LDS apologtics, theological research
- Darius Gray: Independent historian — African-American studies
- Danny Jorgensen: University of South Florida — Religious studies
- Louis C. Midgley: BYU — Professor Emeritus of Political Science. Active in LDS apologetics
- Dallin H. Oaks: University of Chicago; BYU (later, LDS Apostle) — Lawyer. American legal history pertaining to Joseph Smith, Jr.
- Nathan B. Oman: William & Mary — Law. Early LDS ecclesiastical jurisprudence
- Steven L. Peck: BYU — Biologist. Author-essayist on various Mormon-themed subjects
- Daniel C. Peterson: BYU — previous professor of Near Eastern studies. Book of Mormon studies
- John W. Welch: BYU — Law. Editor since 1991 of BYU Studies
