= Boyd Petersen =

American academic (born 1962)

- Born: February 23, 1962 (age 64); Provo, Utah
- Education: French, international relations (B.A.); Comparative literature (M. A., Ph.D.)
- Alma mater: Brigham Young University; University of Maryland, College Park; University of Utah
- Occupations: University professor, author
- Known for: Mormon scholar Editor of Dialogue; Candidate for the Utah House of Representatives
- Political party: Democratic
- Spouse: Elizabeth Davies Petersen Zina Nibley Petersen
- Children: 4
- Website: boydpetersen.com

Boyd Jay Petersen (born February 23, 1962) is program coordinator for Mormon studies at Utah Valley University (UVU) and teaches English and literature at UVU and Brigham Young University (BYU). He has also been a biographer of Hugh Nibley, a candidate for the Utah House of Representatives, and president of the Association for Mormon Letters. He was named editor of Dialogue: A Journal of Mormon Thought for the term 2016-2020.

== Biography ==
Petersen was born in Provo, Utah, and raised as a member of the Church of Jesus Christ of Latter-day Saints (LDS Church). From 1980-1981, he was a proselyting missionary in Paris, France.

After his mission, Petersen attended Brigham Young University (BYU), receiving his bachelor's degree in French and international relations in 1988. In 1995, he received an M.A. in comparative literature from the University of Maryland at College Park. In 2007, he completed his Ph.D. in comparative literature from the University of Utah's Department of Languages and Literature.

Petersen has been an intern for the U.S. House of Representatives, in the staff of the U.S. Senate Committee on Energy and Natural Resources, and a Senior Information Specialist for the Congressional Research Service at the Library of Congress.

In 1984, Petersen married Zina Nibley, a daughter of Hugh Nibley. They have four children and reside in Provo, Utah. In 2017, they were divorced.

Petersen has been a lecturer in the honors program at BYU, and for the English and Humanities Departments at Utah Valley University, where he received a Faculty Excellence Award in 2006. Through his familial relationship to Hugh Nibley, Petersen authored the 2002 biography Hugh Nibley: A Consecrated Life. Petersen has also published articles in several journals, including BYU Studies, Sunstone, Dialogue: A Journal of Mormon Thought, and the Journal of Mormon History.

Petersen is the program coordinator for Mormon Studies at Utah Valley University. He has also been on the board of directors for the Association for Mormon Letters (AML), Mormon Scholars in the Humanities, and Segullah, a Mormon-themed literary journal. He served as AML's president from 2009-2010. He is book review editor for the Journal of Mormon History, and was named editor for Dialogue: A Journal of Mormon Thought for the 2016-2020 term.

== Political campaigns ==
In March 2008, Petersen announced his candidacy for District 64 of the Utah State House of Representatives, running as a socially conservative Democrat in a heavily conservative region. He opposed Republican Rebecca Lockhart on a platform of ethics and health care reform, as well as improved public education. On the November 4 election, Petersen received 30 percent of the vote, losing to Lockhart's 66 percent.

In 2012, Petersen ran again against Lockhart, who had since become the Speaker of the House. On November 6, Petersen lost with 24 percent to Lockhart's 76 percent.

== Published works ==
=== Books ===
- Petersen, Boyd Jay (2002). Hugh Nibley: A Consecrated Life. Salt Lake City: Greg Kofford Books. ISBN 978-1-58958-020-6.
- Myths of Male Mothers: Allegorical Renderings of the Birth Topos in Nineteenth-Century Poetic Production. Saarbrucken, Germany: VDM Verlag Dr. Müller. 2008. ISBN 9783836461900.
- Dead Wood and Rushing Water: Essays on Mormon Faith, Family and Culture. Salt Lake City: Greg Kofford Books. 2013. ISBN 9781589586581.

=== Articles ===
- Petersen, Boyd Jay (1997–98). "Youth and Beauty: The Correspondence of Hugh Nibley". BYU Studies. 37 (2): 6–31.
- Petersen, Boyd (1997). "'Something to Move Mountains': The Book of Mormon in Hugh Nibley's Correspondence". Journal of Book of Mormon Studies. 6 (2): 1–25. JSTOR 44758819. S2CID 165126202. Archived from the original on 2012-06-12.
- "The Priesthood: Men's Last, Best Hope" (PDF). Sunstone. 21 (1): 10–15. March 1998. Archived from the original (PDF) on 2011-07-21.
- Petersen, Boyd (Spring 1998). "The Home Dance: Hugh Nibley Among the Hopi". Dialogue: A Journal of Mormon Thought. 31 (1): 23–35. doi:10.2307/45226413. JSTOR 45226413. S2CID 169048611.
- "On Exceptions to Generalities and the Fine Art of Speculation" (PDF). Sunstone. 21 (4): 63–65. December 1998. Archived from the original (PDF) on 2011-07-21.
- Richard H. Cracroft; Jane D. Brady; Linda Hunter Adams, eds. (2001). "'Something to Move Mountains': Hugh Nibley's Devotion to the Book of Mormon". Colloquium: Essays in Literature and Belief. Provo, Utah: Brigham Young University. pp. 489–513.
- Petersen, B. (Winter 2002). "Landscapes of Seduction: Terry Tempest Williams's Desert Quartet and the Biblical Song of Songs". Interdisciplinary Studies in Literature and Environment. 9 (1). Association for the Study of Literature and Environment: 91–104. doi:10.1093/isle/9.1.91.
- "Truth is Stranger Than Folklore: Hugh Nibley--the Man and the Legend" (PDF). Sunstone (125): 18–23. December 2002. Archived from the original (PDF) on 2018-12-06.
- "Response to Leaving the Saints". FARMS Review. 17 (2): 217–51. 2005. Archived from the original on 2013-03-17.
- "'Endless Vistas of Joy and Excitement': Hugh Nibley's Correspondence as Spiritual Autobiography". Irreantum. 7 (2): 18–21. 2005.
- "Double or Phantom?: Transgenerational Haunting in Mary Shelley's Frankenstein". The New York Review of Science Fiction. 17 (12): 16–20. 2005.
- "The Reality of Artifice: Villiers de l'Isle-Adam's L'Ève future and the Anxiety of Reproduction". The New York Review of Science Fiction. 18 (10). 2006.
- "Mormonism and Torture: Paradoxes and First Principles" (PDF). Sunstone (149): 69–71. April 2008.
- Petersen, Boyd J. (July 2009). "Soulcraft 101: Faith, Doubt, and the Process of Education". Sunstone (155): 42–50.
- "Hugh Nibley: A Life of Faith, Learning, and Teaching". Religious Education Review. 3 (1): 10–15. Winter 2010. Archived from the original on 2011-10-06.
- "Escape from Groundhog Day: Mormon Literary Creation and the Cycle of the Eternal Return". Irreantum. 12 (1): 115–23. 2010.
- W. Paul Reeve; Ardis Parshall, eds. (2010). "Nibley, Hugh". Mormonism: A Historical Encyclopedia. Santa Barbara, CA: ABC-CLIO. pp. 162–64. ISBN 978-1-59884-107-7.
- Patrick Q. Mason; J. David Pulsipher; Richard L. Bushman, eds. (2012). "The Work of Death: Hugh Nibley as a Scholar, Soldier, and Peace Activist". War and Peace in Our Time: Mormon Perspectives. Salt Lake City: Greg Kofford Books. pp. 161–70. ISBN 978-1589580992.
- Petersen, Boyd Jay (Winter 2012). "'One Soul Shall Not Be Lost': The War in Heaven in Mormon Thought". Journal of Mormon History. 38 (1): 1–50. doi:10.2307/23292679. JSTOR 23292679. S2CID 193003753.
- "An Imperfect Brightness of Hope" (PDF). Dialogue. 46 (1): 211–16. Spring 2013.

=== Other ===
- Petersen, Boyd Jay (2005). "As Things Stand at the Moment: Responding to Martha Beck's Leaving the Saints". FAIR Conference.
- "What I Learned about Life, the Church, and the Cosmos from Hugh Nibley". FAIR Conference. 2005.
- "Why I'm a Mormon Democrat". Patheos. September 1, 2009.
- "Mormon Democrats at a Crossroads". Patheos. August 9, 2010.
- "Eternity in an Hour" in Baring Witness edited by Holly Welker (University of Illinois Press, 2021)
