= Mormonism: A Historical Encyclopedia =

Book edited by W. Paul Reeve and Ardis E. Parshall

- Author: W. Paul Reeve (Editor); Ardis E. Parshall (Editor)
- Publisher: ABC-CLIO
- Publication date: August 10, 2010
- Publication place: United States
- Media type: Print (Hardcover)
- Pages: 356
- ISBN: 978-1-59884-107-7

Mormonism: A Historical Encyclopedia (2010) is an encyclopedia designed for a general readership about topics relating to the History of the Church of Jesus Christ of Latter-day Saints. The book was edited by W. Paul Reeve and Ardis E. Parshall. Reeve is a professor of history at the University of Utah and Parshall is an independent historian, newspaper columnist, and freelance researcher.

Most of the Encyclopedia's articles were written by historical researchers expert in the specific area covered, while the tone employed is one of objectiveness, yet respect for the beliefs of Mormonism and its culture. It is published by ABC-CLIO, a Santa Barbara, California-based publisher of reference works, as well as of the history journal, Journal of the West.

== Topics covered and contributors ==
- Mormonism in Historical Context – James B. Allen

=== Eras ===
- Foundation: 1820–1830 – James B. Allen
- Development: 1831–1844 – Stephen C. Taysom
- Exodus and Settlement: 1845–1869 – Ardis E. Parshall
- Conflict: 1869–1890 – W. Paul Reeve
- Transition: 1890–1941 – Thomas G. Alexander
- Expansion: 1941–Present – Jessie L. Embry

=== Events ===
- Black Hawk War – W. Paul Reeve
- Book of Mormon – Stanley J. Thayne and David J. Howlett
- Colonization – W. Paul Reeve
- Correlation – Blair Dee Hodges
- Exodus from Nauvoo – W. Paul Reeve
- First Vision – W. Paul Reeve
- Handcart Migration – W. Paul Reeve
- Haun's Mill Massacre – W. Paul Reeve
- Immigration – Edward H. Jeter
- Kirtland Pentecost – Jonathan A. Stapley
- Manifesto – W. Paul Reeve
- Martyrdom of Joseph and Hyrum Smith – Debra J. Marsh
- Missouri War – David W. Grua
- Mormon Battalion – Bruce A. Crow
- Mountain Meadows Massacre – Richard E. Turley Jr.
- Nauvoo Legion – Ardis E. Parshall
- Organization of the Church – W. Paul Reeve
- Pioneering – Bruce A. Crow
- Priesthood Revelation of 1978 – Jared Tamez
- Reformation – Ardis E. Parshall
- Relief Society – Amy Tanner Thiriot
- Seagulls and Crickets – Edward H. Jeter
- Smoot Hearings – Jonathan H. Moyer
- Temple Work by Proxy – W. Paul Reeve
- Temples – W. Paul Reeve
- Ungathered – Christopher C. Jones
- United States v. Reynolds – Nathan B. Oman
- Utah War – William P. MacKinnon
- Word of Wisdom – W. Paul Reeve
- Youth Programs – Brett D. Dowdle
- Zion's Camp – Ardis E. Parshall

=== People ===
- Leonard James Arrington – Gary James Bergera
- Lowell L. Bennion – Mary Lythgoe Bradford
- Ezra Taft Benson – J.B. Haws
- Juanita Brooks – Levi S. Peterson
- George Q. Cannon – Gary James Bergera
- Martha Hughes Cannon – W. Paul Reeve
- J. Reuben Clark, Jr. – Gary James Bergera
- Heber J. Grant – W. Paul Reeve
- Gordon B. Hinckley – Gary James Bergera
- Howard W. Hunter – W. Paul Reeve
- Spencer W. Kimball – Jacob W. Olmstead
- Harold B. Lee – J.B. Haws
- Amy Brown Lyman – David R. Hall
- Bruce R. McConkie – Ardis E. Parshall
- David O. McKay – Gregory A. Prince
- Thomas S. Monson – Gary James Bergera
- Hugh Nibley – Boyd Jay Petersen
- LaVern Watts Parmley – Ardis E. Parshall
- Orson Pratt and Parley P. Pratt – Matthew J. Grow
- Sidney Rigdon – Ardis E. Parshall
- B.H. Roberts – Gary James Bergera
- Aurelia Spencer Rogers – Ardis E. Parshall
- Patty Bartlett Sessions – Jonathan A. Stapley
- Barbara Bradshaw Smith – Gary James Bergera
- Emma Hale Smith – Janiece Lyn Johnson
- George Albert Smith – Gary James Bergera
- Hyrum Smith– Gary James Bergera
- Joseph F. Smith – Christopher C. Jones
- Joseph Fielding Smith – Matthew Bowman
- Joseph Smith, Jr. – Jed Woodworth
- Smith Family – Lavina Fielding Anderson
- Eliza R. Snow – Jennifer Reeder
- Lorenzo Snow – Alan L. Morrell
- Belle Smith Spafford – Michele A. Welch
- James E. Talmage – Matthew Bowman
- Elmina Shepard Taylor – Gary James Bergera
- John Taylor – Ardis E. Parshall
- Emmeline B. Wells – Michele A. Welch
- Witnesses to the Book of Mormon – Benjamin E. Park
- Wilford Woodruff – Thomas G. Alexander
- Brigham Young – John G. Turner

=== Issues ===
- Church Organization and Government – Gary James Bergera
- Divergent Churches – Jason Smith
- Genealogy and Family History – Ardis E. Parshall
- Local Worship – Bradley H. Kramer
- Mormon Missiology – Jonathan A. Stapley
- Mormon Scripture – Julie Marie Smith
- Mormonism and Blacks – Margaret Blair Young and Darius Aidan Gray
- Mormonism and Economics – Alan L. Morrell
- Mormonism and Education – Jed Woodworth
- Mormonism and Men – Jeffery O. Johnson and W. Paul Reeve
- Mormonism and Native Americans – Sondra Jones
- Mormonism and Other Faiths – J.B. Haws
- Mormonism and Race – Armand L. Mauss
- Mormonism and Science – Ardis E. Parshall
- Mormonism and Secular Government – Nathan B. Oman
- Mormonism and the Family – W. Paul Reeve
- Mormonism and Violence – Robert H. Briggs
- Mormonism and Women – Andrea G. Radke-Moss
- Mormonism as a World Religion – David Clark Knowlton
- Mormonism as Restoration – Samuel Brown
- Mormonism's Contested Identity – J.B. Haws
- Non-Mormon Views of Mormonism – Jan Shipps
- Polygamy – Kathryn M. Daynes and Lowell C. "Ben" Bennion

=== Sidebars ===
- Chronology
- Articles of Faith
- Beehive
- Brigham Young University
- Church Publications
- City of Zion
- "Come, Come Ye Saints"
- Deseret Alphabet
- Emigration Agents
- Extermination Order
- Richard L. Evans
- Family History Library
- Gathering
- Granite Mountain Records Vault
- Thomas L. Kane *
- Mormon Money
- Mormon Tabernacle Choir
- "O, My Father"
- Perpetual Emigrating Fund
- Orrin Porter Rockwell
- Sam Brannan and the Brooklyn
- Silk Culture
- Reed Smoot
- State of Deseret
- Temple Square
- Whistling and Whittling Brigade
- White Salamander Letter **
- ZCMI

* By Matthew J. Grow · ** By Blair Dee Hodges · Unless asterisked, the above sidebars were written by Ardis E. Parshall

== Reviews ==
Booklist's Wade Osburn said the work is "tailor-made for those wanting information on the most prominent figures, the most influential moments, and the hottest topics". School Library Journal contributor Donna Cardon wrote, "Controversial issues, such as polygamy, are handled objectively and explored more extensively than other topics. 'Non-Mormon Views of Mormonism' and 'Mormonism and Other Faiths' are also considered. Occasional use of church-specific jargon occurs without explanation."

== See also ==
- Encyclopedia of Mormonism
- Mormon studies
