= Kelli D. Potter =

American writer

- Education: Brigham Young University (Philosophy, B.A.) Florida State University (Philosophy, M.A.) University of Notre Dame (Philosophy, ABD, M.A.)
- Occupations: Philosopher; Professor
- Writing career
- Language: English language

Kelli D. Potter is an American philosopher and associate professor of philosophy at Utah Valley University. Her areas of expertise include: philosophy of religion, Mormon studies, philosophy of gender, and philosophy of logic. Potter was a founding board member of the Society for Mormon Philosophy and Theology and founding editor of Element: The Journal for the Society for Mormon Philosophy and Theology, serving from 2000 to 2002. Potter also served on the editorial board of Dialogue: A Journal of Mormon Thought from 1999 to 2003.

As a trans woman, Potter has addressed injustices and theology related to the transgender community and the Church of Jesus Christ of Latter-day Saints in her writing.

Potter also works on the nature of religious disagreement within religious traditions, i.e., heterodoxy. She argues that the existence of heterodoxy in all major religious traditions implies that religious belief per se does not have definite cognitive content.

== Works ==
Potter has been published in numerous academic journals, websites, and essay collections.

=== Publications ===
- “Trans and Mutable Bodies,” in The Routledge Handbook to Mormonism and Gender, edited by Amy Hoyt and Taylor Petrey. Routledge: New York. 2020.
- “A Transfeminist Critique of Mormon Theologies of Gender,” in The Lost Sheep in Philosophy of Religion: New Perspectives on Disability, Gender, Race, and Animals (Routledge Studies in the Philosophy of Religion). edited by Blake Hereth and Kevin Timpe. Routledge: New York. 2020.
- “Mormonism and the Problem of Heterodoxy,” Dialogue: A Journal of Mormon Thought, Spring 2016, Vol. 49, No. 1.
- “Religious disagreement: internal and external,” International Journal for Philosophy of Religion, August 2013, Volume 74, Issue 1, pp 21–31.
- “Lehi's Opposition Theodicy,” in Mormonism at the Crossroads of Philosophy and Theology, Greg Kofford Press, 2012.
- “Diagrammatic Representation,” Dialectica 60:4, 2006, pp. 369–382.
- “The Sacramental World View: A philosophical comparison of Joseph Smith’s magical view of ordinances with a Liberation view of sacraments,” Sunstone, December 2006, pp. 48–52. 2006 R.L. “Buzz” Capener Memorial Writing
- Contest in Comparative Religious Studies, Second Place Winner.
- “Liberation Theology in the Book of Mormon,” in Discourses in Mormon Theology, James McLachlan and Brian Birch eds., Greg Kofford Books (October 2007).
- “The Global Church: Exploring the Problem of Religious Diversity from a Mormon Context,” in Spheres of Globalization, ed. David Keller, Utah Valley State, 2006.
- “Restored Epistemology: A Communicative Pluralist Answer to Religious Diversity,” Element: The journal of the society for Mormon philosophy and theology, Vol.1: No. 2, Fall 2005.
- “Toward a New Reading of the Book of Mormon,” Sunstone (Issue 139) November 2005.
- “What Does God write in His Franklin Planner? The Paradoxes of Providence, Prophecy, and Petitionary Prayer,” Dialogue: A Journal of Mormon Thought, Vol. 37 No. 2 .
- “Moral Dilemmas and Inevitable Sin,” Faith and Philosophy, Vol. 20 No. 1 (Jan. 2003): 63–71.
- “The standard argument against diagrams,” Proceedings of the 1999 Conference of the Society of Exact Philosophy. Oxford: Hermes Science Publishing, 2001.
- “Defending Magic: Explaining the Necessity of Ordinances,” Dialogue: A Journal of Mormon Thought, Vol. 35 No. 2 (Summer 2002):139-146.
- “Finitism and the Problem of Evil,” Dialogue: A Journal of Mormon Thought, Vol. 33 No. 4 (Winter 2000): 83–96.
- “How Deep the Chasm? A Reply to Owen and Mosser's Review,” Foundation for Ancient Research and Mormon Studies: Review of Books, Vol. 11, No. 2 (1999) pp. 221–64.
- “Did Christ Pay for Our Sins?,” Dialogue: A Journal of Mormon Thought, Vol. 32 No. 4 (Winter 1999): 73–86.
- “Review of Cultivating Humanity: A Classical Defense of Reform in Liberal Education,” Sunstone, Vol.22:2 (1999), Issue 144.
- “Wong On Davidson,” in Philosophical Papers, Vol. XXIV, No.1 (1995), pp. 75–81.

=== Presentations ===
- "The Subjective Universality of Kant's Aesthetic Judgment" at Discipuli: A Graduate Student's Philosophy Conference at The University of Southern California, March 1992;
- "Hegel's Theodicy" at The Society of Christian Philosopher's Inter-Mountain Regional Mtg, March 1992;
- "On Learning the Holist's Language" at The Northwest Conference on Philosophy at Boise State University, Nov. 1992;
- "Socrates and Moral Truth" at Philosophy Club BYU, Feb. 1993;
- "The Empirical Foundations of Holism" at Discipuli: A Graduate Student's Philosophy Conference at The University of Southern California, March 1993.
- "The Elenchus and Ineradicable Truth" at the Thirty-Ninth Annual Meeting of The Florida Philosophical Association, Nov. 1993.
- "Can Plato Have His Cake and Eat It Too?" at the Fortieth Annual Meeting of The Florida Philosophical Association, Nov. 1994.
- "Truth Theory Limited" at The Limits of Philosophy: The Third Annual Philosophy Conference at DePaul University, May 1996.
- "Truthmakers and Theories of Truth" at the Indiana Philosophical Association's annual conference, Nov. 1997.
- "Moral Dilemmas and Inevitable Sin" at the Pacific APA divisional meeting, April 1999.
- "A Particular Argument against Diagrams" at the Indiana Philosophical Association, April 1999.
- "The Standard Argument against Diagrams" at the Society for Exact Philosophy's annual conference, Lethbridge, Canada, May 1999.
- "Finitism and The Problem of Evil," 25th Annual Sunstone Theological Symposium, Salt Lake City, July 1999.
- "Locke and Berkeley on Abstraction and Infinite Divisibility," American Philosophical Association, Eastern Division Meeting, December 2001.
- “Recollecting God,” Annual Sunstone Theological Symposium, 2001.
- “Defending Magic,” Annual Sunstone Theological Symposium, 2002.
- “Liberation Theology in the Book of Mormon,” Sunstone Theological Symposium, August 2003.
- “War and the Book of Mormon,” Mormon Women's Forum, University of Utah, 2003.
- “Collective Sin and Communal Grace,” Sunstone Theological Symposium, August 2004.
- “Liberation Theology in the Book of Mormon,” The Society for Mormon Philosophy and Theology, March 2004.
- “The Politics of Formalization,” The Radical Philosophy Association, Nov. 2004.
- “Restored Epistemology,” The Society for Mormon Philosophy and Theology, March 2005.
- “Post-mortem Materialism,” Sunstone Theological Symposium, August 2005.
- “Mormonism and the Death Penalty,” Ethics Awareness Week, Fall 2005.
- “Mormon Cultural Studies: South Park,” Sunstone Symposium West, Claremont Graduate School of Religion, April 2006.
- “The Viper Defanged: Radical Mormon Theology vs. Conservative Mormon Practice” presented at The Latin American Association for Religious Studies, São Paulo, Brazil, July 2006. (David Knowlton presented on in Potter's behalf)
- “Mormon Cultural Studies: South Park,” Sunstone Symposium SLC, UT, August 2006.
- “The Sacramental World View: A Philosophical Comparison of Joseph Smith’s Magical View of Ordinances with a Liberation View of Sacraments,” Sunstone Symposium SLC, UT, August 2006.
- “‘The poor is god on earth’: Religious Discourse in Hardt and Negri's Post-Marxian Theory,” Radical Philosophy Association, Creighton University, Omaha, Nov. 2006.
- Guest Lecture at Adams State College in Alamosa, Colorado on Mormon Studies.
- “Opposing Lehi’s Theodicy” The Society for Mormon Philosophy and Theology, March 2008.
- "Heterodoxy and Interreligious Contradiction" The Society of Christian Philosophy, Westmont College, Feb. 2012.
- "Religious Disagreement: Internal and External" The Society for Mormon Philosophy and Theology, Utah State University, Sept. 2012.
- "Mormonism and the Problem of Heterodoxy" The AAR regional conference: Religion in the Rockies and the Great Plains, at University of Denver, June 22, 2013.
- "Mormonism and the Problem of Heterodoxy" Plenary Session: The Society for Mormon Philosophy and Theology, Utah Valley University, Oct 31- Nov 2, 2013.
- "Revisiting the Positivist's Critique of Religious Belief, " The Annual Intermountain Philosophy Conference, October, Utah Valley University, Nov 8, 2013.
- "Mormonism and the Problem of Heterodoxy" The Ethics Center's Conference by the Faculty, Utah Valley University, January 2014.

== See also ==
- List of Mormon studies scholars
