= UHQ =

UHQ or Uhq may refer to:

- Ultra high quality
- Utah Historical Quarterly
- Unhexquadium
