= Robert H. Briggs =

California lawyer and historian

Robert H. Briggs is a Fullerton, California, lawyer and independent historian. As of 2010, Briggs's area of historical research related to violence in frontier Utah, in particular the Mountain Meadows Massacre of 1857.

A member of the Miller Eccles Study Group's board of directors, Briggs also wrote "The Tragedy at Mountain Meadows Massacre: Toward a Consensus Account and Time Line," as well as reviews of Sally Denton's American Massacre, Will Bagley’s Blood of the Prophets, and Richard E. Turley, Jr. et al's Massacre at Mountain Meadows. In 2010, he contributed the article, within this larger philosophical theme, provocatively titled "Mormonism and Violence" to Mormonism: A Historical Encyclopedia.
