= Richard E. Turley Jr. =

American historian (born 1956)

- Born: February 18, 1956 (age 70); Fort Worth, Texas, U.S.
- Education: English (B.A. 1982) (J.D. 1985)
- Alma mater: Brigham Young University; J. Reuben Clark Law School
- Occupation: Assistant Church Historian
- Years active: 20
- Employer: The Church of Jesus Christ of Latter-day Saints
- Known for: Writings on LDS history LDS Church historical program
- Spouse: Shirley Swensen Turley
- Children: 6
- Parent: Richard E. Turley Sr.
- Relatives: Theodore Turley

Richard Eyring "Rick" Turley Jr. (born February 18, 1956) is an American historian and genealogist. He previously served as both an Assistant Church Historian of the Church of Jesus Christ of Latter-day Saints (LDS Church) and as managing director of the church's public affairs department.

== Biography ==
Turley was born in Fort Worth, Texas, to Richard and Betty Jean Nickle Turley. His father, a nuclear engineer, scientist and professor, would later become a mission president and general authority of the LDS Church.

Turley attended high school in Salt Lake City, Utah, when he met Shirley Swensen. They would later marry in the Salt Lake Temple and have six children. Turley aspired to be a lawyer, by his father's urging, and an Institute of Religion teacher, by his deep personal interest in LDS Church history. From 1975 to 1977, Turley served as an LDS missionary to the Japan Tokyo Mission.

After returning from Japan, Turley studied at Brigham Young University (BYU) as a Spencer W. Kimball Scholar, receiving a B.A. in English in 1982. Then, at BYU's J. Reuben Clark Law School, he was editor of the law review and elected to the Order of the Coif. Upon graduation in April 1985, Turley received the Hugh B. Brown Barrister's Award for top classroom performance.

=== Church employment ===
After passing the Utah State Bar examination, Turley practiced law briefly before being hired by the LDS Church in January 1986. He was appointed assistant managing director of the Historical Department, to replace the retiring Earl Olson.

At this time, the department was already heavily involved in the investigation of Mark Hofmann, the historical documents forger who attempted to hide his fraud by murder during the previous October. Turley's legal training helped the department which had examined and acquired several Hoffman forgeries (though some argued it was to hide their controversy).

Watching the case unfold in the press and in books, Turley felt misconceptions lingered from the media frenzy. To tell the story from the perspectives of the murder victims and the LDS Church (which Turley believed had been misrepresented) he published Victims: The LDS Church and the Mark Hofmann Case in 1992 through the University of Illinois Press. Though he wrote the book without church direction, his trusted position granted him church leaders' support and access to interviews, diaries, journals, memoranda, and other records.

=== Expanded role ===
Turley was appointed managing director of the Historical Department in 1989, and in 1996 he also became managing director of the Family History Department. While over the family history department Turley oversaw the launching of familysearch.org.

In 2000, the Family History and Church History departments merged into the Family and Church History Department, over which Turley remained as managing director.

In these roles, Turley oversaw the Church Archives, the Church History Library, and the Museum of Church History and Art, the Family History Library, the FamilySearch Center, the Granite Mountain Records Vault, and over 4,000 branch family history centers. These comprise one of the largest collections of Mormon history, western history, and genealogy in the world. As a person of authority in LDS history and past defender of the church in the Hofmann controversy, Turley later became one of three official LDS Church respondents to a popular 2003 book critical of Mormonism, Under the Banner of Heaven by Jon Krakauer.

=== Digital projects ===
In the department, Turley managed several notable electronic projects. FamilySearch, a massive genealogical database website, was launched in 1999. Other records were also released on CD-ROM, including the Freedman’s Bank (of African-American records), the Mormon Immigration Index, European Vital Records Indexes, and 1880s censuses, including the 1881 British Census, which won the Besterman/McColvin Award from the Library Association of Great Britain. For these efforts, and restoring several LDS historic sites, Turley received the Historic Preservation Medal from President General Linda Tinker Watkins of the Daughters of the American Revolution in 2004.

In 2002, BYU Press published Selected Collections From the Archives of The Church of Jesus Christ of Latter-day Saints, which Turley edited. On 74 DVDs, this released numerous important and rare early documents of the church, which some scholars and historians called "the most important event in modern Mormon publishing," and "an achievement of such significance that no praise, no matter how effusive, seems sufficiently laudatory."

=== Assistant Church Historian ===
More changes came to the department after Marlin K. Jensen became Church Historian in 2005. The department again staffed professional researchers, the Joseph Smith Papers Project sharply expanded, and a new Church History Library was announced.

On March 12, 2008, the Family and Church History Department announced it was becoming two departments again: the Family History Department and the Church History Department. In addition, Turley became the Assistant Church Historian, an ecclesiastical position that was unfilled for over 25 years. Steven L. Olsen, the department's associate managing director, took Turley's old position of managing director.

For his contributions to public history while overseeing the church's archives, records, museums, and historic sites, Turley was awarded the 2013 Herbert Feis Award from the American Historical Association.

=== Public affairs department ===
In April 2016, the church announced that Turley would move from the Church History Department and become the successor to Michael Otterson as the managing director of the church's public affairs department. The two worked closely together through a transition period until Otterson's departure in August, to accept an assignment as a temple president. Among other events and activities in this new role, Turley traveled to the Philippines in December 2017 where he gave three devotionals on Church History.

== Awards ==
In 2017, Turley was given the Mormon Historic Sites Foundation Junius Wells Award.

== Organizations ==
Turley has been involved with several genealogical and historical organizations.

- Historic Sites Committee (LDS Church)
- President of the Genealogical Society of Utah (2000–2008),
- The Joseph Smith Papers editorial board
- Executive Committee of the Joseph Fielding Smith Institute for Latter-day Saint History
- General editor of The Journals of George Q. Cannon series
- President of the Salt Lake City Chapter of the Sons of Utah Pioneers (1990)
- Vice President of the Small Museum Administrators Committee, American Association of Museums
- Utah State Historical Records Advisory Board, National Historical Publications and Records Commission
- Copyright Task Force, Society of American Archivists
- Moderator for The Worlds of Joseph Smith conference in 2005

== Historical philosophy ==
In 1992, Turley commented on how Mormon history can affect the faith of LDS Church members:

Some people may wish to base their faith on historical evidence. While historical information can be useful, interesting and can provide insights to individuals, I don't think that it's the sure foundation of faith. The sure foundation of faith is spiritual and not physical. ... [T]he more an individual learns about the history of the Church, the greater that individual's understanding will be of the overall picture. Thus, every piece of evidence will be viewed against the total picture. Otherwise, people who do not have much knowledge of Church history may find themselves being tossed to and fro by tidbits from the past.

== Publications ==
=== Books ===
- Turley, Richard E. Jr (1992). Victims: The LDS Church and the Mark Hofmann Case. Urbana, Illinois: University of Illinois Press. ISBN 0-252-01885-0.
- ——; Littke, Lael (2003). Stories from the Life of Joseph Smith. Salt Lake City, Utah: Deseret Book. ISBN 1-57008-915-9.
- Walker, Ronald W.; Turley, Richard E. Jr; Leonard, Glen M. (2008). Massacre at Mountain Meadows. Oxford; New York: Oxford University Press. ISBN 978-0-19-516034-5..
- Turley, Richard E. Jr; Slaughter, William W. (2011). How We Got the Book of Mormon. Salt Lake City: Deseret Book. ISBN 9781609080624.
- ——; —— (2012). How We Got the Doctrine and Covenants. Salt Lake City: Deseret Book. ISBN 978-1609071509.
- —— (2021). In the Hands of the Lord: The Life of Dallin H. Oaks. Salt Lake City: Deseret Book. ISBN 9781629728766.
- Turley, Richard E. Jr; Brown, Barbara Jones (2023). Vengeance Is Mine: The Mountain Meadows Massacre and Its Aftermath. Oxford; New York: Oxford University Press. ISBN 978-0195397857..

=== Edited volumes ===
- Cannon, George Q. (1999). Cannon, Adrian W.; Turley, Richard E. Jr; Landon, Michael (eds.). The Journals of George Q. Cannon: To California in '49. Salt Lake City, Utah: Deseret Book. ISBN 1-57345-465-6.
- Turley, Richard E. Jr; Walker, Ronald W., eds. (2009). Mountain Meadows Massacre: The Andrew Jenson and David H. Morris Collections. Documents in Latter-day Saint History. Provo and Salt Lake City: Brigham Young University Press and University of Utah Press. ISBN 978-0-8425-2723-1..
- ——; Harper, Steven C., eds. (2010). Preserving the History of the Latter-day Saints. Church History Symposium. Provo and Salt Lake City, Utah: Religious Studies Center, Brigham Young University and Deseret Book. ISBN 978-0-8425-2777-4..
- Smith, Joseph Jr (2011). Lorimer, Riley M.; Turley, Richard E. Jr; Jensen, Robin Scott (eds.). Published Revelations. The Joseph Smith Papers: Revelations and Translations. Vol. 2. Salt Lake City, Utah: Church Historian's Press. ISBN 9781606419427..
- Turley, Richard E. Jr; Chapman, Brittany A., eds. (2011). Women of Faith in the Latter Days, Volume One: 1775-1820. Salt Lake City: Deseret Book. ISBN 9781609089863.
- ——; ——, eds. (2012). Women of Faith in the Latter Days, Volume Two: 1821-1845. Salt Lake City: Deseret Book. ISBN 9781609071738.
- ——; ——, eds. (2014). Women of Faith in the Latter Days, Volume Three: 1846-1870. Salt Lake City: Deseret Book. ISBN 9781609075880.
- Cannon, George Q. (2014). Cannon, Adrian W.; Turley, Richard E. Jr; Orton, Chad M. (eds.). The Journals of George Q. Cannon: Hawaiian Mission, 1850-1854. Salt Lake City, Utah: Deseret Book. ISBN 9781609078843.

=== Articles and chapters ===
In addition to the following, Turley contributed seven articles to the Encyclopedia of Latter-day Saint History (2000).

- Esplin, Ronald K.; Turley, Richard E. Jr (1992). "Mountain Meadows Massacre". In Ludlow, Daniel H (ed.). Encyclopedia of Mormonism. New York: Macmillan Publishing. pp. 966–68. ISBN 0-02-879602-0. OCLC 24502140.
- Turley, Richard E. Jr (1994). "The Provenance of William E. McLellin's Journals". In Shipps, Jan; Welch, John W. (eds.). The Journals of William E. McLellin. Urbana, Illinois and Provo, Utah: University of Illinois Press and BYU Studies. pp. 257–61. ISBN 0-8425-2316-2.
- —— (July 19, 1997). "Vanguard Pioneers Reach Zion, Send 'Ensign to Nations'". Church News. Salt Lake City: Deseret News. pp. 5, 13.
- —— (Fall 2002). "Latter-day Saint Doctrine of Baptism for the Dead". The BYU Family Historian. 1 (1). Provo, Utah: Center for Family History and Genealogy, Brigham Young University: 23–39.
- —— (Fall 2002). "What's New in Latter-day Saint Church History?: Recent Developments in the Family and Church History Department?". Journal of Mormon History. 28 (2): 1–13. Archived from the original on 2012-05-15.
- Turley, Richard E. Jr (June 27, 2003). "[Reviews of] Under the Banner of Heaven". Church Response to Jon Krakauer's Under the Banner of Heaven. The Church of Jesus Christ of Latter-day Saints.
- Turley, Richard E. Jr (July 14, 2003). "Faulty History: A Review of Under the Banner of Heaven: A Story of Violent Faith" (PDF). Foundation for Apologetic Information & Research.
- —— (2005). "Gathering Latter-day Saint History in the Pacific". In Underwood, Grant (ed.). Pioneers in the Pacific: Memory, History, and Cultural Identity Among the Latter-day Saints. Provo, Utah: Religious Studies Center, Brigham Young University. pp. 145–59. ISBN 0-8425-2616-1.
- —— (2005). "The Calling of the Twelve Apostles and the Seventy in 1835". Joseph Smith and the Doctrinal Restoration: The 34th Annual Sidney B. Sperry Symposium. Provo and Salt Lake City, Utah: Religious Studies Center, Brigham Young University and Deseret Book. pp. 369–380. ISBN 1-59038-489-X. (video link) Also published in Joseph: Exploring the Life and Ministry of the Prophet (2005), pp. 230–242. ISBN 1-59038-471-7
- —— (Summer 2006). "Recent Mountain Meadows Publications: A Sampling". Journal of Mormon History. 32 (2): 213–25.
- —— (September 2007). "The Mountain Meadows Massacre". Ensign. 37 (9). Salt Lake City, Utah: The Church of Jesus Christ of Latter-day Saints: 14–21.
- Walker, Ronald W.; Turley, Richard E. Jr (2008). "The Andrew Jenson Collection". BYU Studies. 47 (3): 5–44. Archived from the original on 2011-11-07.
- ——; —— (2008). "The David H. Morris Collection". BYU Studies. 47 (3): 111–30. Archived from the original on 2011-11-07.
- Turley, Richard E. Jr (2008). "Problems with Mountain Meadows Massacre Sources". BYU Studies. 47 (3): 143–57. Archived from the original on 2011-11-07.
- —— (2009). "[Review of] House of Mourning". Utah Historical Quarterly. 77 (2): 193–95. doi:10.2307/45063189. JSTOR 45063189. S2CID 254430474.
- —— (Spring 2009). "Roundtable on Massacre at Mountain Meadows" (PDF). Dialogue: A Journal of Mormon Thought. 42 (1): 131–36.
- —— (2010). "Mountain Meadows Massacre". In Reeve, W. Paul; Parshall, Ardis E. (eds.). Mormonism: A Historical Encyclopedia. ABC-CLIO. pp. 95–100. ISBN 9781598841084..
- —— (September 2010). "The First Mormon Tabernacle Choir Recordings, 1910". Ensign. 40 (9): 54–59.
- —— (2010). "Assistant Church Historians and the Publishing of Church History". In Turley, Richard E. Jr; Harper, Steven C. (eds.). Preserving the History of the Latter-day Saints. Church History Symposium. Provo and Salt Lake City, Utah: Religious Studies Center, Brigham Young University and Deseret Book. ISBN 978-0-8425-2777-4..
- ——; Reeves, Brian D. (Winter 2011). "Unmasking Another Hofmann Forgery". Journal of Mormon History. 37 (1): x–xiv. doi:10.2307/23291587. JSTOR 23291587. S2CID 254480737.. Also published in the Utah Historical Quarterly, Winter 2011 issue, pages 92–95.
- —— (Spring 2011). ""Epoch in Musical History": The Mormon Tabernacle Choir's First Recordings". Utah Historical Quarterly. 79 (2): 100–121. doi:10.2307/45063346. JSTOR 45063346. S2CID 254439955..
- —— (2014), Clash of the Legal Titans: The First Trial of John D. Lee July 20 to August 7, 1875 (PDF), Juanita Brooks Lecture Series, St. George: Dixie State College of Utah, archived from the original (PDF) on April 17, 2014.
- ——; Cannon, Jeffrey G. (2016). "A Faithful Band: Moses Mahlangu and the First Soweto Saints". BYU Studies. 55 (1): 8–38.

=== Other ===
- Turley, Theodore (1982). Turley, Richard E. Jr (ed.). Theodore Turley: Mission Journal, 1839-1840 (Thesis). Provo, Utah: Brigham Young University.
- Turley, Ida Elizabeth Eyring (1997). Turley, Richard E. Jr (ed.). The Diary of Ida Elizabeth Eyring Turley: 1874-1952. Salt Lake City: s.n.
- Turley, Richard E. Jr, ed. (2002). Selected Collections from the Archives of the Church of Jesus Christ of Latter-day Saints (electronic resource, 2 volumes). Provo, Utah: Brigham Young University Press.
- Turley, Richard E. Jr (2006). Why Can't I Forget My Sins? (sound recording). Salt Lake City, Utah: Deseret Book. ISBN 1-59038-553-5.
