= William P. MacKinnon =

- Born: September 9, 1939 (age 87)
- Education: Mount Hermon School
- Alma mater: Yale; Harvard (MBA, 1962)
- Occupations: Management consultant and former General Motors executive
- Known for: Independent historian
- Spouse: Patricia
- Awards: 2008 Mormon History Association Thomas L. Kane Award; Utah State Historical Society Dale L. Morgan and LeRoy S. Axland awards
- Website: Occasional guest author – Keepapitchinin.org

William P. MacKinnon is an American independent historian. A management consultant, MacKinnon is a historian of the American West, Mormon history, and Utah history who was described by Richard E. Turley in 2018 as "the acknowledged expert" and by Thomas G. Alexander in 2019 as "the most knowledgable authority" on what was known in its time as the American War of the Mormons' Succession (or more recently "the Utah War"), a topic of which MacKinnon began his study as a Yale sophomore history major in 1958. In 2018, MacKinnon presented the 35th Juanita Brooks Lecture at Dixie State University: "Across the Desert in 1858: Thomas L. Kane’s Mediating Mission and the Mormon Women who Made it Possible." As of 2010, MacKinnon lived in Santa Barbara with his wife, Patricia.

== Publications ==
MacKinnon has published over thirty journal articles on the history of the American West. In 2010, he contributed an article to Mormonism: A Historical Encyclopedia.

- (2009) "Full of Courage: Thomas L. Kane, the Utah War, and BYU's Kane Collection as Lodestone', BYU Studies Quarterly: Vol. 48 : Iss. 4, Article 6.
- William P. MacKinnon (2016). William P. MacKinnon (ed.). At Sword's Point, Part 2: A Documentary History of the Utah War, 1858–1859. Kingdom in the West: The Mormons and the American Frontier. Vol. 11. University of Oklahoma Press. ISBN 9780806156743.
- William P. MacKinnon (2016). William P. MacKinnon (ed.). At Sword's Point, Part 1: A Documentary History of the Utah War to 1858. Kingdom in the West: The Mormons and the American Frontier. Vol. 10. University of Oklahoma Press. ISBN 9780806157252.
