= Ardis E. Parshall =

American historian (1959–2026)

Ardis E. Parshall (March 10, 1959 – February 22, 2026) was an American independent historian who researched Latter-day Saint history. Parshall published her research on her blog, Keepapitchinin. In addition to her research work, Parshall worked for the Salt Lake Tribune as a historical writer from 2005 to 2011. She also published a book entitled, The Corianton Saga. Parshall co-edited books including Mormonism: A Historical Encyclopedia and Dime Novel Mormons.

== Background ==
Parshall was born on March 10, 1959. She died on February 22, 2026, at the age of 66.

== Research ==
According to W. Paul Reeve, Parshall conducted research that highlights individuals whose stories are largely unknown. In a Salt Lake Tribune article, Reeve said, "Ardis [E. Parshall] is one of the most dogged researchers working in the Mormon past" and that "[s]he recognizes...little scraps of history, and their connections to bigger contexts, and is a pro at discovering people who otherwise have been forgotten.

According to a Salt Lake Tribune article, Parshall's research was used by others "without attribution" on "several" occasions. The Tribune article stated that this "[lack of] attribution" occurs "frequently" in the realm of religious research. Quoting media ethics analyst Kelly McBride, the Tribune article noted that "publishers want to attract [religious] audience[s] 'without the elbow grease you should do and without crediting those who did.'"

=== Keepapitchinin ===
Keepapitchinin is a Latter-day Saint history blog created by Parshall. Author and editor Gary James Bergera highlighted Keepapitchinin as a blog that "feature[s] some of the most provocative Mormon-related discussions taking place today." Professor Jared Farmer called Keepapitchinin "a box of treasures," praising Parshall's "expert historical commentary" included on Keepapitchinin.

In 2010, Parshall wrote a blog post entitled, "The Best Beards in Mormon History: Results Show." This post won a blogging award from the Association for Mormon Letters. In addition to the Association for Mormon Letters blogging award, Parshall's Keepapitchinin won several Bloggernacle awards, published on a blogging website: Wheat and Tares. In 2008, Keepapitchinin won a Bloggernacle award for "Best New Blog." In 2008, 2009, 2012, and 2013, Parshall's blog won a Bloggernacle award entitled, "Best Solo Blog."Parshall's Keepapitchinin also won Bloggernacle awards for the "Best Historical Post" in 2008 and the "Best Doctrinal Post" in 2010.

=== The Century of Black Mormons project ===
According to W. Paul Reeve, the Century of Black Mormons project is a "digital history project" that "recover[s]...the identities of Black Latter-day Saints" who lived between 1830 and 1930. Parshall wrote and consulted for the University of Utah's Century of Black Mormons project as a "contributing scholar." Additionally, Parshall worked as a member of the project's advisory council, with Reeve also being a member of the advisory council.

== Recognitions ==
=== John Whitmer Historical Association ===
In 2018, Parshall received an award from the John Whitmer Historical Association alongside Michael Austin. Together, Parshall and Austin won the Association's "Best Anthology" award for their work on Dime Novel Mormons.

=== Mormon History Association ===
As noted by JSTOR, the Mormon History Association (MHA) is "an independent non-profit...organization devoted to all aspects of the scholarly study of the Mormon past." In 2024, the MHA awarded individuals for their work related to the Church of Jesus Christ of Latter-day Saints (LDS Church) and Community of Christ. MHA identified Parshall as "a pioneer in Mormon Studies public history" who has made "major contributions" to Latter-day Saint public history. MHA named an award after Parshall entitled the Ardis E. Parshall Public History Award. This award is given to individuals who "rigorous[ly]" contribute to public history. The award was first distributed in 2021 to Parshall, herself, for her blog, Keepapitchinin.

=== Contributions to other scholars ===
Parshall's research has been used by many Latter-day Saint scholars. Among these are Steven C. Harper (referenced Parshall's research in his work entitled First Vision: Memory and Mormon Origins), Nathan Oman (received "research notes" from Parshall when writing an academic article entitled, "The Blessing That's Anticipated Here Will Be Realized in the Next Life"), W. Paul Reeve (referenced Parshall's research in his book entitled, Religion of a Different Color: Race and the Mormon Struggle for Whiteness), and Matthew Grow (mentioned Parshall's research in his academic article entitled, "Biography in Mormon Studies").

== Selected literary works ==
=== The Corianton Saga ===
In 2022, Parshall wrote The Corianton Saga, which provides insight into the life of Corianton, a man referenced in the Book of Mormon. Although briefly mentioned in the Book of Mormon, Parshall stated that Corianton's story was "arguably the most popular and well-known narrative from the Book of Mormon" for "earlier generations of Latter-day Saints." In The Corianton Saga, Parshall supports this claim by exposing readers to various forms of media that highlighted Corianton's story.

=== Dime Novel Mormons ===
This work was co-edited by Parshall and Michael Austin in 2017. Dime Novel Mormons highlights four examples of dime novels that "represent[ed] different aspects of the Mormon image." The four novels highlighted in Dime Novel Mormons were published between the years 1870 and 1903.

=== Mormonism: A Historical Encyclopedia ===
Parshall co-edited Mormonism: A Historical Encyclopedia alongside W. Paul Reeve. The Encyclopedia was published in 2010. Mormonism: A Historical Encyclopedia includes discussions about various topics related to the LDS Church and its history. More specifically, the book highlights various "[e]ras" in Latter-day Saint history. It also discusses "[e]vents," "[p]eople," and "[i]ssues" related to its history.
