= Mormon studies =

Academic study of Mormonism

Mormon studies is the interdisciplinary academic study of the beliefs, practices, history and culture of individuals and denominations belonging to the Latter Day Saint movement, a religious movement associated with the Book of Mormon, though not all churches and members of the Latter Day Saint movement identify with the terms Mormon or Mormonism. Denominations of the Latter Day Saint movement include the Church of Jesus Christ of Latter-day Saints (LDS Church), by far the largest, as well as the Community of Christ (CoC) and other smaller groups, include some categorized under the umbrella term Mormon fundamentalism.

Before 1903, writings about Mormons were mostly orthodox documentary histories or anti-Mormon material. The first dissertations on Mormons, published in the 1900s, had a naturalistic style that approached Mormon history from economic, psychological, and philosophical theories. While their position within Mormon studies is debated, Mormon apologetics have a tradition dating back to Parley P. Pratt's response to an anti-Mormon book in 1838.

The amount of scholarship in Mormon studies increased after World War II. From 1972 to 1982, while Leonard Arrington was a Church Historian in the history department, the LDS Church Archives were open to Mormon and non-Mormon researchers. Researchers wrote detached accounts for Mormon intellectuals in the "New Mormon history" style. Many new publications started to publish history in this style, including Dialogue: A Journal of Mormon Thought, BYU Studies Quarterly, and Exponent II. Some general authorities in the church did not like the New Mormon history style, and Arrington and his remaining staff were transferred to Brigham Young University (BYU) in 1982, where they worked in the Joseph Fielding Smith Institute for Church History. The institute continued to support scholarship in Mormon history until 2005, when the institute closed and employees transferred to the LDS Church Office Building.

In the late 1980s and 1990s, several other incidents made BYU faculty reluctant to voice unorthodox ideas about church history. Around 1990, BYU professors were asked not to contribute to Dialogue or Sunstone. Two historians were excommunicated in 1993, probably for their published unorthodox views. BYU Studies and other LDS church-sponsored publishers published more "faithful" scholarship at this time. Presses outside of Utah started to publish more books in Mormon studies.

== Pre-1903 writings about Mormons ==
Before World War II, church histories were mostly either orthodox Mormon or anti-Mormon and written by faithful Mormons or hostile non-Mormons, respectively. A few writers in the first era of church history (1830–1905) wrote about Mormons as a curiosity and focused on their peculiar ways.

=== Anti-Mormon literature ===
Non-Mormons wrote for a non-Mormon public about how "primitive and dangerous" Mormons were in "extreme terms." Eber D. Howe published Mormonism Unvailed, or a Faithful Account of that Singular Imposition and Delusion in 1834, which claimed that Sidney Rigdon was the original author of the Book of Mormon and that Joseph Smith was a "vile wretch." Howe included affidavits from people who knew Joseph Smith collected by ex-Mormon Philastus Hurlbut. The book influenced future anti-Mormon literature by La Roy Sunderland, John Bennett, and John A. Clark. Origen Bacheler examined the Book of Mormon itself in Mormonism Exposed Internally and Externally, arguing that the book was inconsistent with the Bible and was written by Joseph Smith himself.

In the 1960s, ex-Mormons Jerald and Sandra Tanner continued that anti-Mormon tradition by reprinting anti-Mormon works in the public domain as well as important but unflattering documents from LDS history through Utah Light House Ministry. They published their own criticisms of the LDS church as well, which, unlike early anti-Mormon works, cite historical documents. Ed Decker, an excommunicated Mormon, made two anti-Mormon films: The God Makers (1982) and The God Makers II (1993). The films described Mormons as being a cult, abusing women and children, manipulating news outlets, and practicing Satanism. The God Makers II received criticism from other anti-Mormons, including Jerald and Sandra Tanner, who stated it contained inaccuracies.

=== Official church records and early histories ===
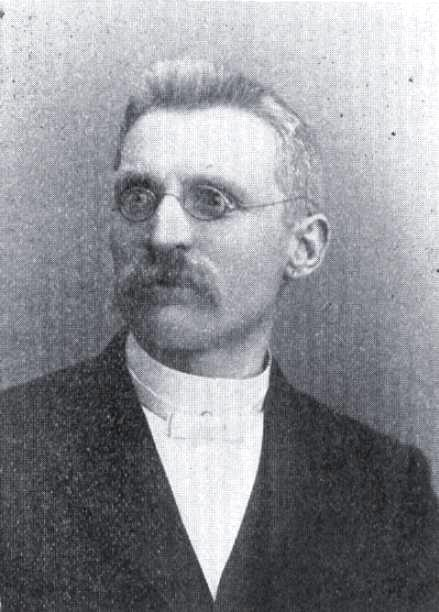
Andrew Jenson wrote the LDS Biographical Encyclopedia

Official recorders have existed since Joseph Smith organized the Church of Christ on April 6, 1830. Church records continue to the present and are kept in the LDS church archives. The first official church history was published in 1842 when Smith and his associates began writing History of Joseph Smith as an official diary of Joseph Smith. This history was published in Times and Seasons in Nauvoo, and then in Deseret News and Latter-day Saints' Millennial Star up until 1863. History of Joseph Smith was followed by History of Brigham Young, which was also published in Deseret News and Millennial Star over the next two years. Church Historians and their assistants edited the material, which was published in official publications. Andrew Jenson made sizable contributions to documentary church history with the Latter-day Saint Biographical Encyclopedia (1901–36), Encyclopedic History of the Church (1941), and an unpublished "Journal History of the Church" containing over 1,500 scrapbooks filled with published and unpublished records of daily activities in the church. Jenson made a special report on the Mountain Meadows Massacre, and parts of the report were not openly used until Massacre at Mountain Meadows (2008) by Richard E. Turley, Ronald W. Walker, and Glen M. Leonard.

The first historian to attempt to summarize Mormon history on a large scale was Edward Tullidge, who wrote Life of Brigham Young: or Utah and Her Founders (1876), History of Salt Lake City (1886), and History of Northern Utah and Southern Idaho (1889). Hubert How Bancroft wrote History of Utah (1889) with the help of the Historian's Office. Bancroft's history of Utah portrayed Mormons favorably. Critics say he wasn't objective since he allowed LDS Church authorities to read the book before publication. Perhaps his favorable treatment was how he obtained access to the church records. Expanding on Bancroft's history, Orson F. Whitney wrote History of Utah (1898–1904) in four volumes. Joseph Fielding Smith wrote Essentials of Church History in 1922. Most of these accounts combined various testimonies into a single narrative without questioning the validity of the eyewitnesses or other observers, especially those of church authorities.

Mormons wrote accounts for other Mormons, often published in church-sponsored venues like The Juvenile Instructor and in church-published lesson manuals. These writings were written for a Mormon audience to support their beliefs. Brigham H. Roberts was an associate editor of the Salt Lake Herald and, while on a mission to England, was the editor of the Millennial Star. Upon returning to Utah, he became a General Authority. After an invitation from Americana, Brigham H. Roberts wrote a chapter each month from 1909 to 1915 in what later became the Comprehensive History of the Church of Jesus Christ of Latter-day Saints: Century One. The history had some of the first historical analysis of events in church history. It was serialized in Americana 1909–1915.

From 1830 to 1930, women were victims or symbols in historical accounts. Church historians mentioned their suffering but rarely mentioned them by name. Anti-polygamy tracts also described Mormon women in general terms, describing them as deluded or miserable. In an effort to combat the way anti-polygamists portrayed Mormon women, Edward Tullidge and Eliza R. Snow compiled The Women of Mormondom (1877), a book that portrayed Mormon women as hardworking and independent in a combined history, biography, and theology. Heroines of Mormondom (1884) highlighted faithful Mormon women's lives. Women wrote short biographies of other women and recorded them in Women's Exponent and through publications from the Daughters of the Utah Pioneers.

== Early Mormon studies ==
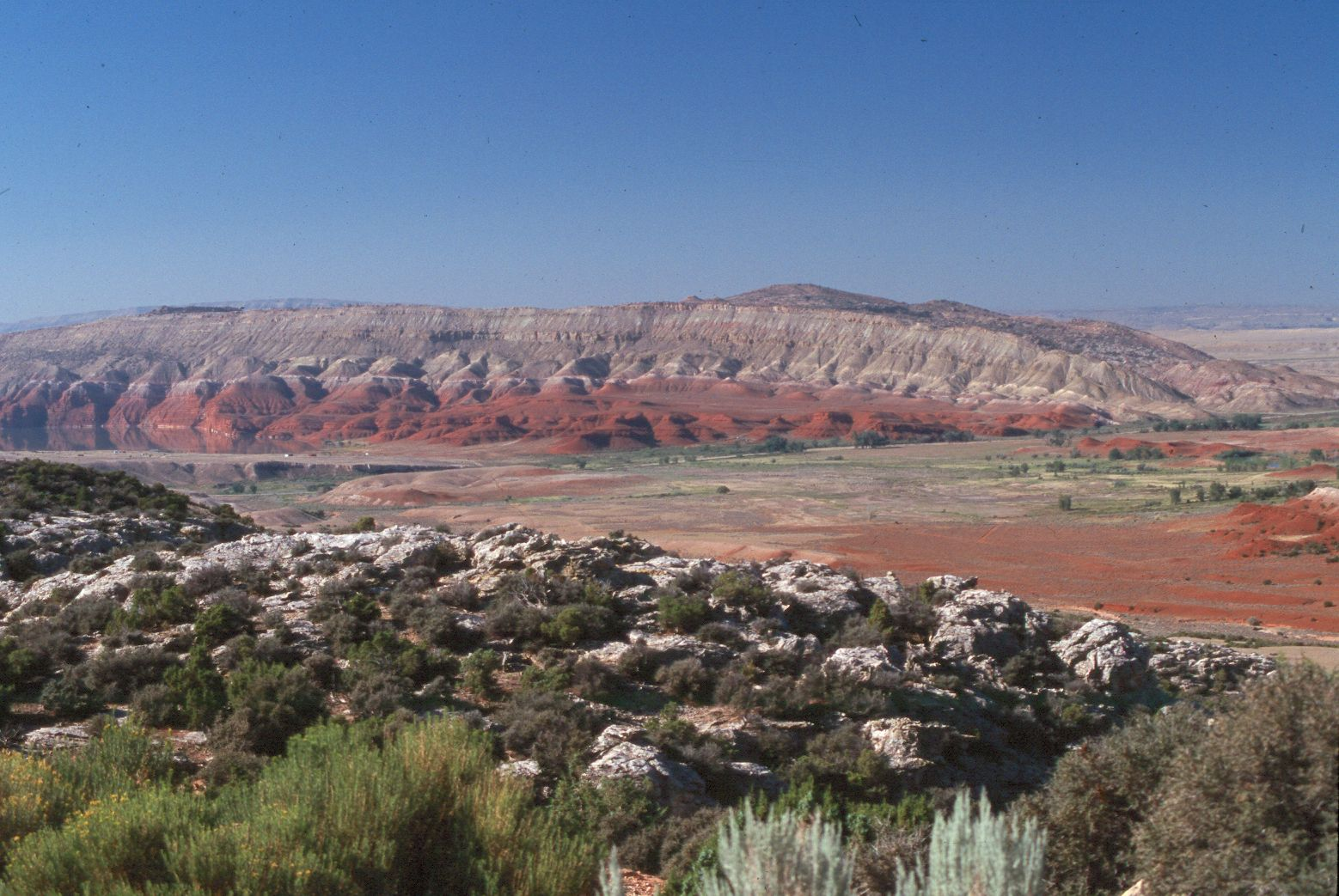
Great Basin Desert

Early academic writers on Mormon topics had a "naturalistic" approach to history, using theory from economics, psychology, and philosophy to guide their study. Richard Ely contributed to the professionalization of Mormon studies with his early dissertation "Economic Aspects of Mormonism" (1903). In the work, he praised Mormon irrigation and communalism as a good model of economic development. He influenced Leonard Arrington's interest in economics and Mormons. Andrew Love Neff wrote "The Mormon Migration to Utah," which he finished in 1918 but had started over ten years earlier. He was interested in how Mormons helped colonize the West. Mormon Ephraim Edward Ericksen wrote "The Psychological and Ethical Aspects of Mormonism" (1922) while studying at the University of Chicago. His dissertation, influenced by functionalist theory, argued that Mormonism was a product of conflicts with non-Mormons and harsh environments. Lowry Nelson, a Mormon, studied at the University of Wisconsin in the 1920s. He worked in agriculture and was dean of BYU's College of Applied Science and director of the Utah Agriculture Experiment stations. He wrote articles about how the Mormon village was designed to promote unity and sociability, which allowed Mormon settlers to colonize the Great Basin Desert. He left Utah in 1937. Nels Anderson studied at the University of Chicago and studied hobos in Utah, where he converted to Mormonism. His book Desert Saints (1944) recounted the history of saints in the St. George, Utah area. Other scholars publishing on Mormonism from this time period include I. Woodbridge Riley, Walter F. Prince, Franklin D. Daines, Hamilton Gardner, Joseph Geddes, Feramorz Fox, Arden Beal Olsen, William McNiff, Kimball Young, Austin Fife and Alta Fife.

In the 1950s, after World War II, an increasing number of Mormons studied history professionally and wrote dissertations about Mormon history. Non-Mormon sociologist Thomas F. O'Dea wrote a dissertation entitled "Mormon Values: The Significance of a Religious Outlook for Social Action" after living in a rural Mormon farming village in New Mexico for six months and subsequently teaching at Utah State University. This study of Mormon culture "stunned Mormon readers with its objectivity and sympathetic insight," according to Mormon scholar Richard Bushman. (O’Dea expanded this into The Mormons in 1957.) Bernard DeVoto, Dale L. Morgan, Fawn McKay Brodie, Stuart Ferguson, and Juanita Brooks did not have graduate degrees in history, but made significant contributions to the foundations of Mormonism's "New History" movement. Brodie wrote No Man Knows My History (1945), which some contemporary reviews praised as definitive and scholarly. Other LDS scholars, notably Hugh Nibley, criticized Brodie's biography. In 1950, Juanita Brooks, a Columbia University-trained housewife who formerly taught English composition at a nearby college, published a well-researched book on the Mountain Meadows Massacre, which many saw as balanced. Brooks's Mormon neighbors did not like "the frankness" of her book.

== Apologetics and polemics ==
Mormon scholars are divided on whether or not apologetics should be considered part of Mormon studies. Brian D. Birch argues that it should be a part of Mormon studies, as long as apologetic authors concede that their arguments are objective and subject to academic debate. Apologists write defensively, and view their polemical responses to criticism as a battle for their faith. Parley P. Pratt responded to Mormonism Unveiled in detail in his 1838 pamphlet Mormonism Unveiled: Zion's Watchman Unmasked and Its Editor Mr. L.R. Sunderland Exposed, Truth Vindicated, the Devil Mad, and Priestcraft in Danger! Pratt argued against Sunderland's character, quoting Hurlbut, who stated that Sunderland has a "notorious character."

Hugh Nibley's No, Ma'am, That's Not History set a standard for apologetics to use academic language, and criticized Brodie's use of sources in her controversial biography of Joseph Smith, No Man Knows My History. The Foundation for Ancient Research and Mormon Studies (FARMS) aimed to support the historical authenticity of the Book of Mormon and respond to criticism, and used Nibley's style to counter research that contradicted the Book of Mormon's ancient origins. FARMS collaborated with Deseret Book to publish the complete works of Hugh Nibley starting in 1984. In 1997, LDS church president Gordon B. Hinckley invited FARMS to be officially affiliated at BYU, and in 2006 it was subsumed by the Neal A. Maxwell Institute of Religious Scholarship. In 2012, Daniel C. Petersen, the editor of FARMS Review, started publishing a new journal called Interpreter. In 1997 the Foundation for Apologetic Information and Research (FAIR), a volunteer group including both laypeople and academics, was established to answer criticisms of the Mormon faith.

Some church members published works countering the Book of Mormon's ancient origins, sponsored by the Smith-Pettit Foundation in Salt Lake City and published by Signature Books. New Approaches to the Book of Mormon: Explorations in Critical Methodology, edited by Brent Metcalfe and American Apocrypha by Dan Vogel and Metcalfe contained diverse views of the Book of Mormon's origins. American Apocrypha described the Book of Mormon as a work of fiction reflecting its environment. FARMS critiqued the publications vigorously and negatively. Both Vogel, Metcalfe, and contributing author David P. Wright were ultimately excommunicated by the church.

=== Counter-apologetics ===
In the 1990s and 2000s, Evangelicals Carl Mosser and Paul Owen encouraged other Evangelicals to respond to Mormon apologetics. Evangelical Craig L. Blomberg discussed whether or not Mormons were Christian with Mormon Stephen E. Robinson in How Wide the Divide? A Mormon and Evangelical in Conversation. Richard Bushman encouraged fellow Mormon historians to be less defensive and more open to criticism, and also to do research on Mormon history from a consciously Mormon point of view.

== New Mormon history ==
Over the years, scholars raised within the Latter-day Saint tradition and professionally trained academically, often in the social sciences, began to enter the field. A flowering of these efforts in the 1960s has come to be known as the New Mormon history. The publication of Dialogue: A Journal of Mormon Thought, the newly established Mormon History Association, and the professionalization of LDS and RLDS history departments provided spaces for historians to do new research in Mormon topics. RLDS scholars founded the John Whitmer Historical Association in 1972. In 1974, Claudia Bushman, Laurel Thatcher Ulrich and others founded the magazine Exponent II. The first issue of BYU Studies was published in 1959.

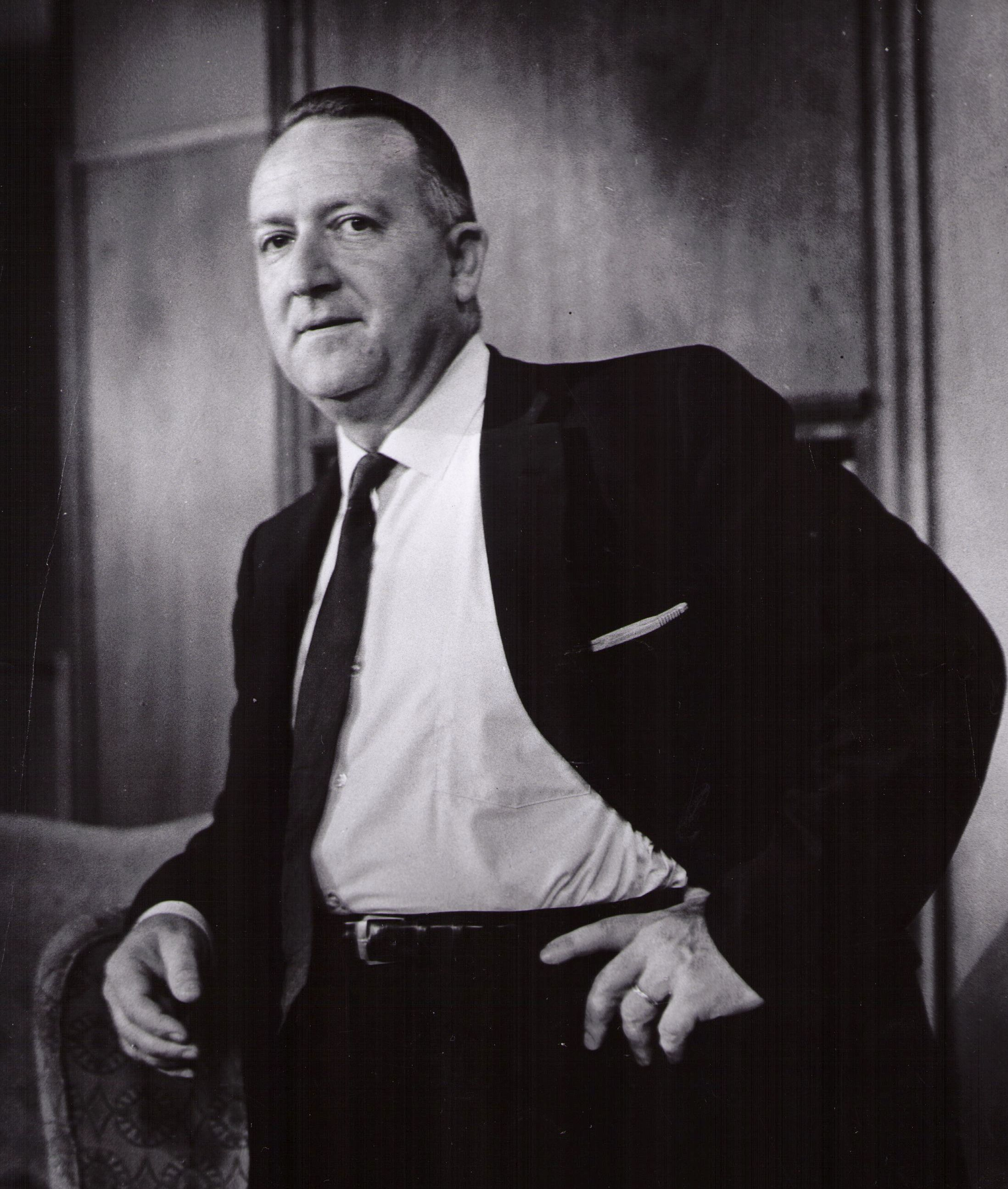
Leonard Arrington

In 1972, the LDS Church hired Leonard Arrington as their historian. During Arrington's time as historian, Mormon and non-Mormon historians were allowed to access the LDS Church Archives. Much of the research in the 1970s used these newly available sources to examine church history, sometimes in great detail. Leonard Arrington influenced important scholars of Mormon history, including Richard Jensen, William Hartley, and Ronald Walker. In 1969, Jewish historian Moses Rischin named the increasing amount of Mormon scholarship "the New Mormon history." The "New Mormon history" movement included non-Mormons Thomas F. O'Dea, P.A.M. Taylor, Mario De Pillis, Lawrence Foster, Community of Christ member Robert Flanders, and Mormon scholar Klaus Hansen.

Maureen Ursenbach Beecher was a leading researcher in women's studies. In the 1970s women's biographies were published, but not integrated into larger narratives. Other women hired by the Church Historical Department included Jill Mulvay Derr, Carol Cornwall Madsen, and Edyth Romney. Journals dedicated special issues to Mormon women, and the increased interest in Mormon women led to more publications focused on them. Scholars published biographies of Emma Smith, Eliza Snow, Emmeline B. Wells, and Amy Brown Lyman. Beecher's efforts would also prove instrumental to the founding of the Association for Mormon Letters, the first scholarly association aimed at the literature of the Latter-day Saints.

Some writers looked at Mormon women's history with the goal of restructuring historical narratives. Mormon feminist articles on Mormon history started with the special Summer 1971 issue of Dialogue on women's issues and continued in publications like Exponent II (starting in 1974), and Mormon Sisters: Women in Early Utah (1976), edited by Claudia Bushman. Beecher and Laurel Thatcher Ulrich edited another volume about Mormon women's history in Sisters in Sprit: Mormon Women in Historical and Cultural Perspective (1987). Women and Authority: Re-emerging Mormon Feminism (1992) was another milestone in feminist publications, and it encouraged Mormon women to be empowered by their history and "reclaim lost opportunities."

Most New Mormon historians were LDS. Their audience was Mormon intellectuals and non-Mormons. They maintained their respect for the Mormon faith, admitted to flaws in people and policies, and avoided taking a defensive stance, a tone which non-Mormon historian Jan Shipps wrote "made them seem more secular than they actually were." Mormon history by non-Mormons at this time had a similar detached tone. New Mormon historians often published with the University of Illinois Press in order to publish for an academic audience independent of the church. Charles S. Peterson argued in The Great Basin Kingdom Revisited that Arrington took an exceptionalist view of Mormon history, which he then taught to other New Mormon historians. This exceptionalist view was that they could believe in both secular history and orthodox Mormon views of the restoration.

== LDS church reaffirms orthodoxy and New Mormon faith historians ==
The LDS church stopped funding so much research and limited access to the church archives. Apostle Ezra Taft Benson warned employees in the Church Educational System against New Mormon history in a 1976 speech. He said that writing history in a neutral style undermined "prophetic history." Boyd K. Packer's 1981 article, "The Mantle is Far, Far Greater than the Intellect", was published in BYU Studies. He wrote that contemporary historians were too eager to focus on the faults of church leaders and dismiss spiritual inspiration. In 1982, historians from Arrington's department were transferred to Brigham Young University, where they were assigned to teach in the history department and worked in the Joseph Fielding Smith Institute for Church History.

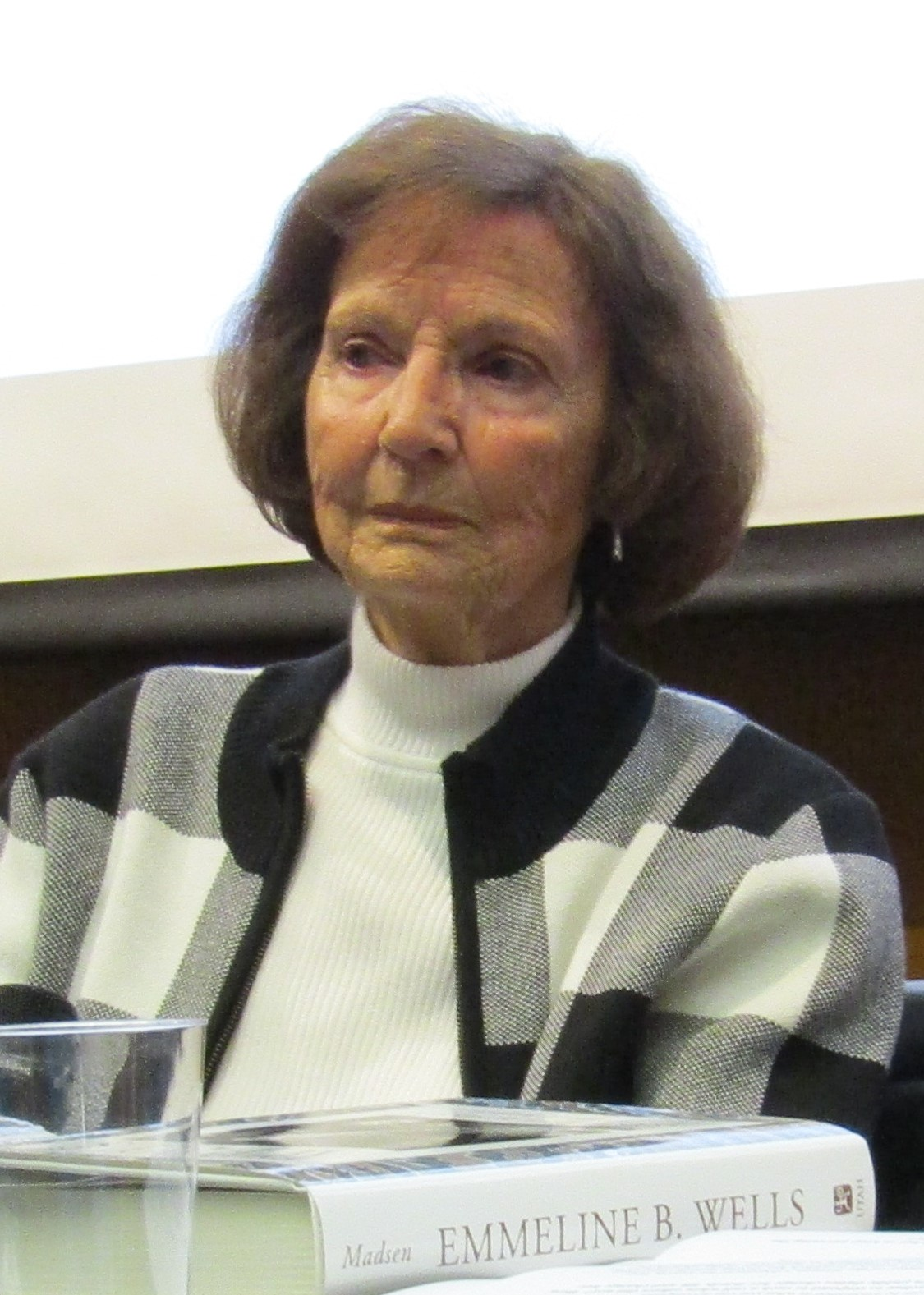
Carol Cornwall Madsen

After Arrington died in 1999, Ronald K. Esplin and Jill Mulvay Derr led the Joseph Fielding Smith Institute for Church History at BYU. Carol Cornwall Madsen led research in the Women's History Initiative at the institute, where she wrote a critical biographical study of Emmeline B. Wells. In 2001, Richard Bushman retired from full-time teaching at Columbia University and was a research director at the Smith Institute. Dean C. Jessee started editing Joseph Smith's papers in The Personal Writings of Joseph Smith. The Smith Institute closed in 2005, and institute staff and the Smith Papers project moved to the Church Office Building. The Joseph Smith Papers project, started by the LDS church in 2001, aimed to publish Joseph Smith's papers with rigorous accuracy and was validated by the National Historic Public Records Commission.

Jan Shipps asserts that this reluctance to support New Mormon history was a response to the Mark Hofmann document forgeries. Also, some church authorities disliked the books and articles produced by the history department, which noted flaws and strengths of people in church history. Shipps states that the increase in new converts to the LDS Church led General Authorities to emphasize the need for "palatable" versions of church history in museums and historical sites rather than in-depth articles in church-sponsored publications. Mormon sociologist Armand Mauss argued that Mormonism was a struggle between remaining distinctive and assimilating to accepted American cultural practices; scholar Ronald Helfrich speculates that the change in General Authority's reception to Arrington's research was because they feared assimilating too much. General interest in Mormon studies continued during the 1980s, with over 2,000 books, articles, and other material published on Mormon history.

BYU Studies and Deseret Book published more New Mormon historians after General Authority pushback against New Mormon history. One of these New Mormon historians was Louis Midgely, who argued that from a relativist, postmodern theory, the Mormon view that the LDS Church had divine origins was just as valuable and valid as others. New Mormon historians said that the New Mormon scholars left faith out of their analyses. Many were members of FARMS and often saw writers of New Mormon history as the same as other anti-Mormons, even though most writers of New Mormon history were Mormon. The difference between the New Mormon historians and New Mormon scholars was hard to define.

Along with Arrington's transfer and a subsequent increase in restrictions in the LDS Church Archives, several other incidents led to an intellectual chilling of Mormon history by Mormons in the 1990s. In 1992, Arrington wrote that "the church cannot afford to place its official stamp of approval on any 'private' interpretation of its past," and the LDS Church must not sponsor this kind of history. In September 1993, the LDS church excommunicated the September Six, which included historians Lavina Fielding Anderson, D. Michael Quinn and Maxine Hanks. These excommunications served as a warning to other Mormon historians. Quinn's excommunication was perhaps tied to his idea that Mormon women had been given the priesthood in 1843, which he published in an essay in Women and Authority: Re-emerging Mormon Feminism. In 2003, he was scheduled to give a speech at a conference at Yale, which was co-sponsored by BYU, and BYU stated they would withdraw their funding if Quinn presented his paper. That same year, Quinn applied to work as a professor at the University of Utah and Arizona State University. He was not hired as a professor, possibly because of fears that LDS people in power would retaliate against the university. In 1986, BYU administrators were asked not to contribute to Dialogue or present at the Sunstone symposium; around 1990, BYU professors were asked not to contribute to Dialogue or Sunstone. Eugene England, one of the founders of Dialogue and then a professor at BYU, spoke out against these prohibitions. He was asked not to write for the Encyclopedia of Mormonism in 1990, and in 1998, he was asked to retire from BYU without justification at age 65. After retiring from BYU, he started one of the first Mormon studies programs at Utah Valley State College. According to a 1997 report by the American Association of University Professors on academic freedom at BYU, Alan Wilkins was questioned about his motives for contributing to Dialogue and Sunstone in a tenure review. The report also mentioned other incidents where the BYU administration criticized speakers and articles for criticism of the church, among other complaints.

In 1997, Joanna Brooks argued that Mormon studies aimed to critically examine Mormonism, not to determine religious truths. She postulated that Mormon studies done as a type of cultural study would help scholars in the field feel less defensive and more productive. Outside of Brigham Young University and Utah, the University of North Carolina Press, Knopf, and the University of Oklahoma Press published books on Mormonism. In the 2000s, Jan Shipps greatly influenced news articles about Mormons; often, she is the only expert cited for an entire article. In 2005, the National Endowment for the Humanities held a seminar at Brigham Young University on the bicentennial of Joseph Smith's birth. Terryl Givens, a comparative literature scholar, analyzed discourse about the Book of Mormon in By the Hand of Mormon: The American Scripture that Launched a New World Religion in 2002.

Mormon women's history has not been well integrated into general histories. Arrington and Davis Bitton discussed women's issues in two chapters on marriage and sisterhood in The Mormon Experience (1992). The Story of the Latter-day Saints (1992) by James Allen and Glen Leonard mentioned women in the context of auxiliaries like Relief Society and Primary, plural marriage, suffrage, and the ERA. The Encyclopedia of Latter-day Saint History (2000) contained 435 entries about men but only 64 about women, with three-quarters of the women receiving less than a page of description. Church publication Our Heritage (1996) only mentioned a few women. Women's history remained in a "separate sphere." In 2011, Susan W. Tanner wrote Daughters in My Kingdom, an official history of the Relief Society. Outside of Mormon history specialists, Mormon women are rarely mentioned.

== Newer Mormon history ==
As of the early 2010s Non-Mormon scholars were still often suspicious of LDS scholars' work. That is gradually changing as non-Mormon scholars increase and universities not affiliated with the LDS Church have endowed chairs for Mormon studies. Kathleen Flake is the first Richard L. Bushman Chair of Mormon Studies at University of Virginia, and Patrick Mason is the Howard W. Hunter Chair of Mormon Studies at Claremont Graduate University in California.

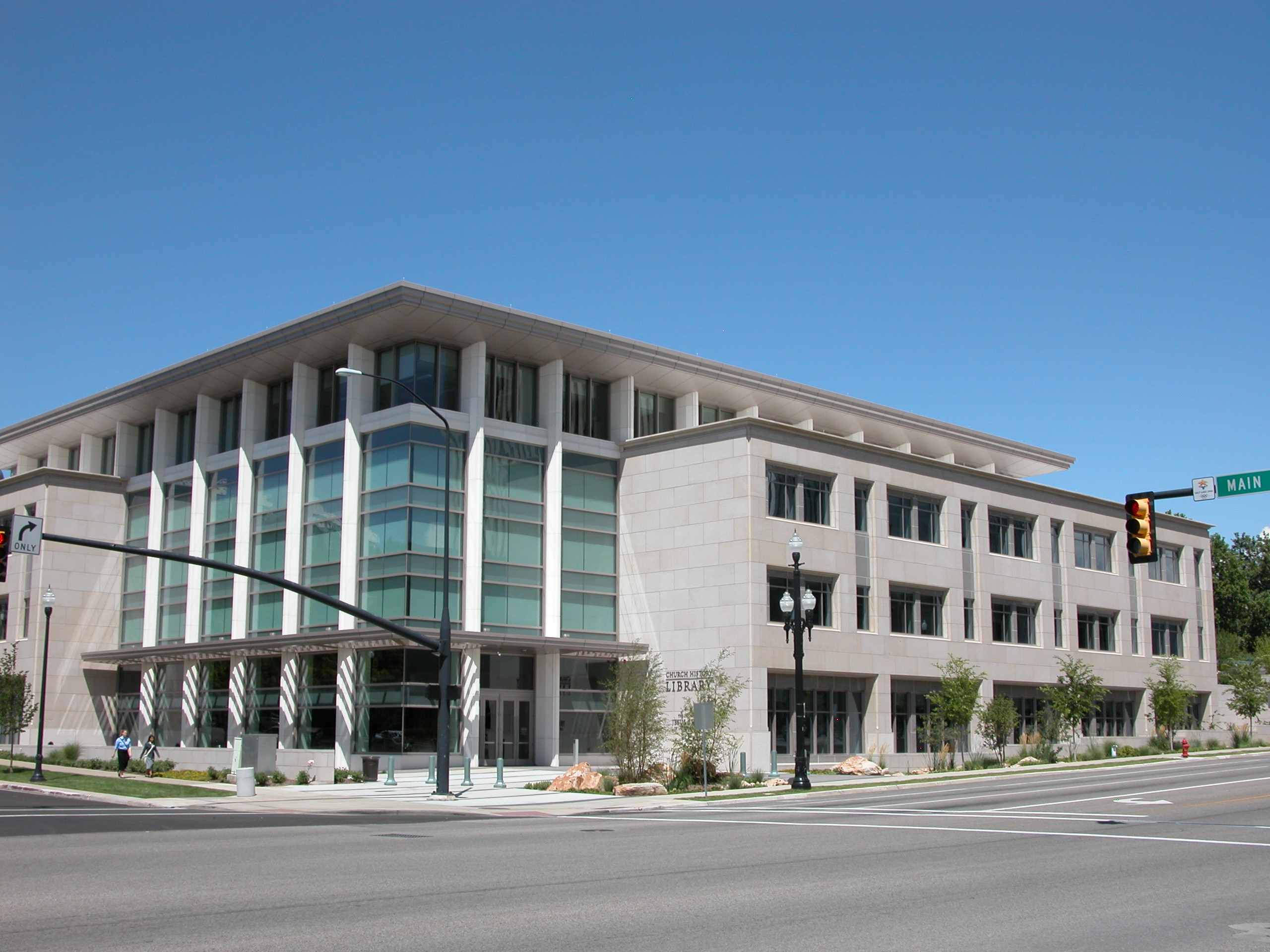
Church History Library in Salt Lake City

The Church History Library still restricts access to certain documents for most scholars. Scholars may self-censor their research for fear of losing access to documents from the Church History Library. Previous excommunications of Mormon historians give Mormon researchers the sense that they are being watched. Scholars from various disciplines see the New Mormon history movement as ending, bring replaced by post-New Mormon history or "Newer Mormon History." This emerging movement is interdisciplinary and endeavors to place Mormon studies in a broader historical context, further eroding boundaries between disciplines. Mormon women's history has not been well-integrated with other Mormon studies topics. Contemporary historians like R. Marie Griffith, Grant Wacker, and Robert Orsi encourage the use of interdisciplinary tools in Mormon studies.

Included in these interdisciplinary tools are oral histories. In 1972, the Charles Redd Center for Western Studies was established at BYU, where Jessie L. Embry directed an extensive oral history project. The Church History Department started their own oral history project in 2009. Claudia L. Bushman and her students started the Claremont Oral History collection in 2009, and papers using the oral history data were published in Mormon Women Have Their Say: Essays from the Claremont Oral History Collection.

The Church History Department hired a specialist in women's history in 2011, Kate Holbrook. She co-authored The First Fifty Years of Relief Society: Key Documents in Latter-Day Saint Women's History with Jill Mulvay Derr, Carol Cornwall Madsen, and Matthew J. Grow. Laurel Thatcher Ulrich said the book was "the most important work to emerge from a Mormon Press in the last 50 years." Jennifer Reeder, specializing in 19th century women's history, was hired in 2013. Brittany Chapman Nash and Lisa Tait also specialize in women's history and work in the Church history department. Nash works in public services and helps researchers to be aware of women's sources the archive offers. She co-authored Women of Faith in the Latter Days with Richard Turley. Tait works on the web team, helping to add a "Women of Conviction" section to church history website. In 2017, Reeder and Holbrook edited a compilation of women's speeches called At the Pulpit: 185 Years of Discourses by Latter-day Saint Women.

Saints: The Story of the Church of Jesus Christ in the Latter Days is a four-volume history of the church, written by the Church History Department, and published from 2018 to 2024. It is the first official history published by the church since Roberts's Comprehensive History of The Church of Jesus Christ of Latter-day Saints. The series features many women's voices and includes many controversial topics.

== Blogs and Mormon studies ==
The Mormon blogosphere influences Mormon studies. In 2011, Patrick Mason surveyed 113 Mormon blog readers who were also graduate students. Most respondents viewed blogs as a way to democratize Mormon studies. Since blogs are independent from Church institutions, many felt that blogs were a safe space to test more unorthodox ideas. A few observed that men's voices are more prominent in the blogging community, though a few prominent blogs have all-women authors. Other respondents felt that blogs made Mormon studies "more of an echo chamber," and were "superficial," and "glorified navel-gazing." One of the most popular blogs, By Common Consent, had over two million page visitors in 2011. It and other blogs are influential on Mormon studies.

== Archives ==
Archives with significant Mormon collections include the L. Tom Perry Special Collections at BYU, the Church Archives in Salt Lake, the J. Willard Marriott Library at the University of Utah in Salt Lake, Utah State University Libraries, and the Beinecke Rare Book and Manuscript Library at Yale in New Haven, Connecticut.

== Awards ==
Awards for writing or service in the field of Mormon studies are presented annually by scholarly societies. The Mormon History Association (MHA) and the John Whitmer Historical Association (JWHA) each present annual awards for various categories within Mormon history, such as books, biographies, documentary history, journal articles, and lifetime achievement. The MHA also gives awards for theses and student papers. The Utah State Historical Society (USHS), which frequently engages Mormon history, also presents awards for books, articles, and student papers. Literary awards are presented by the Association for Mormon Letters, often awarding Mormon publications in biography, criticism, and special categories. Dialogue: A Journal of Mormon Thought honors the best contributions to its journal and Interpreter: A Journal of Mormon Scripture awards the best article submitted by a woman.

Universities also present awards. The University of Utah gives the Juanita Brooks Prize in Mormon Studies and offers a Mormon Studies Fellowship. Utah State University's Evans Biography Awards focus on biographies significant to "Mormon Country". Student writing competitions are held by Utah State University, the MHA, and the JWHA. BYU Religious Education presents annual awards to its faculty for teaching, research, and service, as well as books in the categories of church history or ancient scripture.

== Academic programs ==
Several universities have programs in the study of Mormonism, with professors named to oversee coursework, research, and events on Mormon studies. While independent academic programs have emerged in recent years, devotional religious education programs have existed far longer. Additional colleges have also taught courses on Mormonism without having institutionally sponsored programs, but they are not included in the list below.

=== Independent ===
- Utah State University, Program of Religious Studies, including the Arrington Chair of Mormon History and Culture (est. 2007)
- Claremont Graduate University, School of Religion, including the Hunter Chair of Mormon Studies (est. 2008)
- Utah Valley University, Comparative Mormon Studies program
- University of Utah, Tanner Humanities Center's Mormon Studies Initiative, including the Marlin K. Jensen Scholar and Artist in Residence (est. 2016) and the Simmons Professor of Mormon Studies (est. 2017)
- University of Virginia, Graduate Program in Religious Studies, including the Richard Lyman Bushman Chair of Mormon Studies (est. 2012)
- University of Wyoming, Mormon Studies Initiative
- University of Southern California, School of Religion, including the John A. Widtsoe Chair of Mormon Studies (announced 2015)
- Graduate Theological Union, Director of Mormon Studies (named 2017)

=== Denominationally affiliated ===
- Brigham Young University Religious Education (Provo, Utah; Rexburg, Idaho; Laie, Hawaii campuses; and also the BYU Jerusalem Center for Near Eastern Studies) — For official LDS Church approved religious instruction.
  - Advanced historical research is instead conducted at the LDS Church's Church History Library, while BYU's Harold B. Lee Library and the Huntington Library also hold historical materials important to Mormon studies.
- Fuller Theological Seminary's School of Intercultural Studies — Department at multi-denominational Protestant Christian seminary that has occasionally held seminars on Evangelical–Latter-day Saint dialogue and comparative theology
- Graceland University — Non-denominational university affiliated with Community of Christ. Teaches religion classes and is connected with the denomination's seminary.
- LDS Church Institutes of Religion — Offers official LDS Church approved religious instruction, often at locations adjacent to institutions of higher learning

== Other institutions ==
- Association for Mormon Letters
- Church History Department of the LDS Church
- European Mormon Studies Association
- Foundation for Apologetic Information & Research
- John Whitmer Historical Association
- Mormon Historic Sites Foundation
- Mormon History Association
- Neal A. Maxwell Institute for Religious Scholarship
- Society for Mormon Philosophy and Theology
- Sunstone Education Foundation

== Print resources ==
=== Multi-volume document compilations ===
- Early Mormon Documents (1996–2003) — 5 volumes; Dan Vogel, editor (Signature Books)
- History of the Church (1902–1912) — 7 volumes; B.H. Roberts, editor (LDS Church affiliated)
- The Joseph Smith Papers (2008–ongoing) — 15 out of about two dozen projected volumes, as of 2017 (jointly affiliated: LDS Church and US National Historical Publications and Records Commission)
- Journal History of the Church (1906–2008) — Over 1,200 volumes, compiled by the LDS Church as a massive daily record
- Journal of Discourses (1854–1886) — 26 volumes of sermons by LDS Church leaders (LDS Church affiliated; non-"canonical")
- Significant Mormon Diaries series (1987–2013) — 13 volumes (Signature Books)

=== Brief reference works ===
- Encyclopedia of Mormonism (1992)
- Encyclopedia of Latter-day Saint History (2000)
- Historical Dictionary of Mormonism (2008) [1994]
- Mapping Mormonism: An Atlas of Latter-day Saint History (2012) [1994]
- Mormonism: A Historical Encyclopedia (2010)
- Studies in Mormon History: An Indexed Bibliography (2000) — now maintained online

=== Journals ===
- BYU Studies (LDS Church affiliated)
- Dialogue: A Journal of Mormon Thought
- Element: a Journal of Mormon Philosophy and Theology — The Society for Mormon Philosophy and Theology
- Exponent II — Quarterly feminist magazine
- International Journal of Mormon Studies — Print: ISSN 1757-5532; online: ISSN 1757-5540
- Interpreter: A Journal of Mormon Scripture — Print: ISSN 2372-1227; Online: ISSN 2372-126X
- Journal of Book of Mormon Studies (LDS Church affiliated)
- John Whitmer Historical Association Journal — Latter Day Saint movement history journal, founded by CoC members
- Journal of Mormon History
- Mormon Historical Studies — Mormon Historic Sites Foundation, ISSN 1535-1750.
- Mormon Studies Review
- Restoration Studies — CoC history journal (jointly affiliated: CoC and John Whitmer Historical Association)
- Sunstone
- Utah Historical Quarterly — publishes many Mormon studies articles

=== Publishers ===
The following primarily publish books on Mormon studies:

- Brigham Young University Press
- Brigham Young University Studies
- Maxwell Institute Press (Neal A. Maxwell Institute for Religious Scholarship, formerly FARMS)
- Religious Studies Center
- Church Historian's Press
- Community of Christ Seminary Press
- By Common Consent Press
- Greg Kofford Books
- John Whitmer Books
- Signature Books (often with the Smith-Pettit Foundation)
- Utah Lighthouse Ministry (Evangelical Christian "anti-Mormon" research ministry)

Several publishers within the devotional religious market also occasionally publish in Mormon studies, including the LDS publishers Cedar Fort, Inc., Covenant Communications, and Deseret Book (which is owned by the LDS Church), as well as Herald House (which is owned by the Community of Christ).

In addition, certain general book publishers or university presses have also published significant Mormon studies. These include:

- Alfred A. Knopf
- Fairleigh Dickinson University Press
- Oxford University Press
- University of Illinois Press
- University of Oklahoma Press
  - Arthur H. Clark Company
- University of Utah Press
- Utah State University Press

== See also ==
- Bloggernacle
- Kirtland Egyptian papers authorship controversy
- LDS fiction
- Linguistics and the Book of Mormon
- Mormon apologetics
- List of Mormon studies scholars
- Mormonism and history
- Mormonism: A Historical Encyclopedia
- The Mormons (PBS documentary)
- Reformed Egyptian
