= Helen Andelin =

Founder of the Fascinating Womanhood Movement (1920–2009)

- Born: Helen Lucille Berry; May 22, 1920; Mesa, Arizona
- Died: June 7, 2009 (aged 89); Pierce City, Missouri
- Education: Brigham Young University (home economics); University of Utah
- Spouse: Aubrey Passey Andelin (1918–1999, m. 1942)
- Children: 8
- Writing career
- Genre: Self-help
- Subject: Feminine enchantment
- Notable works: Fascinating Womanhood, 1963
- Website: www.fascinatingwomanhood.com

Helen Berry Andelin (May 22, 1920 – June 7, 2009) was the founder of the Fascinating Womanhood Movement, beginning with the women's marriage classes she taught in the early 1960s.

== Biography ==
Helen Berry was born in 1920 to Herbert and Anna May Berry, in a Latter-day Saint (LDS) family living in Mesa, Arizona. In her teens, Helen worked in a malt shop and at her parents' hotel. She graduated from Phoenix Union High School and attended Brigham Young University, where she majored in Home Economics.

At Brigham Young University, she met and married dentist Aubrey Andelin. They had eight children.

== Fascinating Womanhood ==
Andelin wrote the book Fascinating Womanhood in 1963 to complement the marriage enrichment classes she taught in Central California. She sold approximately 300,000 copies from her garage through a publishing firm she and her husband founded, Pacific Press Santa Barbara.

Going against the "second wave" feminist tide of the 1960s, the classes and book focused on women developing romantic relationships with their husbands and securing stable homes. The classes continue to this day in countries including the United States, Japan, Mexico, Brazil, South Africa, Saudi Arabia, United Kingdom, and the Philippines.

The first online Fascinating Womanhood class was held in 2000-2001

Eventually reissued in several editions, Fascinating Womanhood has sold over five million copies worldwide, and has been translated into Spanish, French, Japanese, Korean, Portuguese, Czech, Polish and Russian. Random House issued the latest edition of the book in February 2007.

Andelin hosted a website on which she gave advice on marriage and motherhood.

Other books by Andelin include The Fascinating Girl, a book addressed to single women, which was originally published in 1969 and remained in print as of 2007; and All About Raising Children, published in 1980. Andelin also designed The Domestic Goddess Planning Notebook.

Andelin made many media appearances over the years. She was interviewed by Michael Douglas, Larry King, Phil Donahue, Hugh Downs, and Barbara Walters. She appeared in the March 10, 1975 issue of Time magazine, in an article called "Total Fascination".

== Later life ==
In 2006, the Helen B. Andelin Papers were donated to the University of Utah, where they remain housed in the Marriott Library Special Collections.

Andelin died on June 7, 2009, in Pierce City, Missouri. She was survived by eight children.

Fascinating Womanhood is now led by Andelin's daughter, Dixie Andelin Forsyth, who wrote a sequel, Fascinating Womanhood for the Timeless Woman, released in 2018. In addition, she has updated her mother's original book, with Vintage editions of each.
