= Fascinating Womanhood =

1963 non-fiction work by Helen Andelin

Fascinating Womanhood: A Guide to a Happy Marriage
- Author: Helen B. Andelin
- Subject: Self-help, marriage, interpersonal relations
- Publisher: Pacific Press; Santa Barbara (self-published)
- Publication date: January 1, 1963
- Publication place: US
- Media type: Print (hardcover)
- ISBN: 9780553384277
- OCLC: 80146122
- Followed by: The Fascinating Girl

Fascinating Womanhood is a book written by Helen Andelin and published in 1963. The book recently went into its sixth edition, published by Random House.

== History ==
Derived from a set of booklets published in the 1920s and 1930s by the Psychological Press, the book seeks to help traditionally-minded women to make their marriages "a lifelong love affair". According to Time magazine, Andelin wrote Fascinating Womanhood when "she felt her own marriage wasn't the romantic love affair she had dreamed of."

The book's self-published edition sold over 400,000 copies, and since being published by Random House, has sold more than 2 million copies, including outside the US. It has been translated into seven languages.

== Sources ==
The book takes many of its sources from historical women and from examples provided in classic literature. One of the "real-life" women, Mumtaz Mahal of Taj Mahal fame, is cited as one of the ideal women who possessed both an angelic and a human side. More sources come from classic literature: Amelia (the original domestic goddess) of William Makepeace Thackeray's Vanity Fair, Agnes and Dora from David Copperfield by Charles Dickens, and Deruchette from Victor Hugo's Toilers of the Sea.

== Fascinating Womanhood movement ==
The book was published in the early 1960s when second-wave feminism became mainstream. By 1975, according to Time magazine, the movement included 11,000 teachers, and over 300,000 women had taken Fascinating Womanhood classes.

== Feminist criticism ==
Fascinating Womanhood has gained the attention of feminist writers, who largely regard the book as detrimental to women in various ways. In 1978, psychologist Martha L. Rogers wrote an article ("Fascinating Womanhood as a Regression in the Emotional Maturation of Women") positing the argument that women who follow the book's teachings were doing so out of a fear of being self-actualized individuals. Juanne N. Clarke of Wilfrid Laurier University wrote that the movement used Rosabeth Moss Kanter's model of commitment mechanisms to analyze the techniques used to gain women's allegiance. More recently, Pink Think: Becoming a Woman in Many Uneasy Lessons, by Lynn Peril, cited Fascinating Womanhood as part of a body of literature that seeks to promote "an idealized version of womanhood". Finally, communications writer Julia Woods discusses the Fascinating Womanhood movement in Gendered Lives: Communication, Gender, and Culture.
