= Nathan Oman =

American law professor

Nathan B. Oman
- Born: April 15, 1975 (age 51); Salt Lake City, Utah, U.S.
- Education: Brigham Young University (BA); Harvard Law School (JD)
- Occupations: Associate professor, William & Mary Law School, teaching contracts, law and religion, secured transactions
- Spouse: Heather Bennett Oman
- Parent(s): Richard G.and Pamela Oman, Susan Staker
- Website: W&M – Nathan Oman

Nathan Bryan "Nate" Oman (born April 15, 1975) is the Rollins Professor of Law at the law school of the College of William & Mary. He is a legal scholar and educator. In 2006, he became an assistant professor at William & Mary's law school. In 2003, Oman founded Times & Seasons, a Mormon blog.

== Biography ==
Oman was raised in Salt Lake City, Utah. He served a mission for the LDS Church in South Korea. Oman holds a BA in political science from Brigham Young University and a JD from Harvard Law School.

He worked on the staff of Senator Mitch McConnell before going to law school. He clerked for Judge Morris S. Arnold. Prior to joining the faculty of William and Mary, Oman was a practicing lawyer in Washington, DC. Oman has been a visiting professor at Hebrew University, Cornell Law School, and the University of Richmond Law School.

Oman is the son of Richard G. Oman, an art curator at the LDS Church History Museum and an expert on LDS art. His mother is Susan Staker, retired, former editorial director at Adobe Systems and editor for Sunstone magazine and Signature Books.

Oman and his wife, Heather Bennett, are the parents of two children.

== Writings ==
Oman specializes in contract law, the foundations of private law, and law and religion. Oman's work has appeared in such law journals as the Harvard Law Review, Michigan Law Review, Georgetown Law Journal, Minnesota Law Review, Iowa Law Review, and BYU Law Review. He has also been a frequent presenter at conferences of the J. Reuben Clark Law Society.

He wrote an article on the 2008 Mitt Romney presidential campaign for the San Francisco Chronicle. In addition, he has published op-eds in the National Review, The Washington Times, and The Richmond-Times Dispatch. Since late 2010 he has been a regular columnist for the Deseret News.

In late 2010 Oman criticized the US auto bailout: "Taxpayer money became vital to GM's and Chrysler's continued survival precisely because the presence of taxpayer money understandably scared away private investors. ... [The two auto giants] could have gone through bankruptcy like everyone else. It did, however, undermine the trust on which successful capitalism depends."

Oman has written on many themes related to Mormon studies, contributing to Dialogue: A Journal of Mormon Thought, the FARMS Review, BYU Studies, Element: The Journal of the Society for Mormon Philosophy and Theology and wrote articles on legal themes for Mormonism: A Historical Encyclopedia and contributed the article on Mormons for the forthcoming Encyclopedia of the Supreme Court of the United States.

Oman along with Alan Meese wrote for the Harvard Law Review Forum an in-depth analysis of Burwell v. Hobby Lobby and the question of whether the Religious Freedom Restoration Act should apply, arguing that actions of corporations are within the intended scope of religious freedom.

Another recent work by Oman was International Legal Experience and the Mormon Theology of the State, 1945–2012 published in the Iowa Law Review.

Oman is the author of The Dignity of Commerce: Markets and the Moral Foundations of Contract Law published by the University of Chicago Press.

California Appellate Law Group's Anna-Rose Mathieson and Oman co-authored a friend-of-the-court briefs signed by Oman and twenty additional Mormon studies scholars and filed with the US Supreme Court with regard to the Court's review of the Trump Administration's travel bans. The brief draws parallels between historical US government-sanctioned and promoted anti-Mormon with the anti-Muslim atmosphere surrounding the proposed ban currently.
