= Patrick Q. Mason =

American historian

Leonard J. Arrington Chair of Mormon History and Culture Utah State University
- Incumbent
- Assumed office July 2019
- Preceded by: Philip Barlow

Howard W. Hunter Chair of Mormon Studies Claremont Graduate University
- In office 2011–2019
- Preceded by: Richard Bushman

Personal details
- Born: 1976 (age 49–50) Sandy, Utah, U.S.
- Education: Brigham Young University (BA); University of Notre Dame (MA, PhD)
- Profession: Historian
- Known for: Mormon Studies

Patrick Q. Mason (born 1976) is an American historian specializing in the study of the Latter-day Saint movement. Since 2019, he has held the Leonard J. Arrington Chair of Mormon History and Culture at Utah State University.

== Early life and education ==
Mason earned a BA in history from Brigham Young University in 1999, an MA in history from the University of Notre Dame in 2003 and a second MA there in International Peace Studies, also in 2003. In 2005 he was awarded a PhD in history, also from the University of Notre Dame.

As a graduate student, Mason took a summer seminar at Brigham Young University in Latter-day Saint history run by Richard L. Bushman.

== Career ==
Mason was the Howard W. Hunter Chair in Mormon Studies at Claremont Graduate University from 2011 to 2018. He previously held positions at American University in Cairo and the Joan B. Kroc Institute for International Peace Studies at the University of Notre Dame. He has been interviewed and cited as an expert on Mormonism by outlets such as the Los Angeles Times, NPR, The Salt Lake Tribune, Religion Dispatches Magazine, and KPCC public radio in Pasadena, California.

In January 2012, Mason published an opinion piece in The Washington Post regarding diversity within Latter Day Saints thought. He was featured on New England Cable News in May 2012 regarding the "Mormon movement" in Arkansas, and has been quoted in both The New York Times and the Los Angeles Times on Republican presidential candidate Mitt Romney. Mason is also the author of The Mormon Menace: Violence and Anti-Mormonism in the Postbellum South which received positive reviews in the Journal of American History and the Journal of Southern Religion. He has authored a number of articles and book chapters on Mormonism and American religion history.

Mason's research projects as of 2006 included a biography of Ezra Taft Benson, a former president of the Church of Jesus Christ of Latter-day Saints, and a book on Mormon theology and ethic of peace.

In 2016, Mason advocated for what he described as a more embracing LDS church. Mason participated in a short-lived joint blog in a current-issues/events debate format, at the non-partisan religion website Patheos.com, with psychologist John P. Dehlin, who has often been critical of the LDS Church and has been excommunicated from the same.

== Selected works ==
Books

- The Mormon Menace: Violence and Anti-Mormonism in the Postbellum South Oxford University Press, 2011. ISBN 978-0199740024
- Planted: Belief and Belonging in an Age of Doubt Deseret Book, Neal A. Maxwell Institute for Religious Scholarship, 2015 ISBN 978-1-62972-181-1
- Mormonism and Violence Cambridge University Press, 2019 ISBN 978-1108706285

Articles and chapters

- "Honor, the Unwritten Law, and Extralegal Violence: Contextualizing Parley Pratt's Murder," in Parley P. Pratt and the Making of Mormonism, ed. Gregory Armstrong, Matthew J. Grow, and Dennis Siler (Norman, OK: Arthur H. Clark, 2011), 245–273.
- "God and the People: Theodemocracy in Nineteenth-Century Mormonism," Journal of Church and State 53:3 (Summer 2011): 349–375.
- "Opposition to Polygamy in the Postbellum South," Journal of Southern History 76:3 (August 2010): 541–578.
- "What's So Bad about Polygamy? Teaching American Religious History in the Muslim Middle East," Journal of American History 96:4 (March 2010): 1112–1118.
- "Shrine of the Black Madonna," "Lynching," and "Henry McNeal Turner," in The Encyclopedia of African American History, eds. Leslie Alexander and Walter Rucker (Santa Barbara, CA: ABC- CLIO, 2010): 257–258, 871–874, 1060–1062.
- "Christian Zionism and Its Religious Influence in American Politics," with Khadiga Omar, US-Arab Issues no. 1 (Spring 2009), Prince Alwaleed Bin Talal Bin Abdulaziz Alsaud Center for American Studies and Research, American University in Cairo.
- "The Prohibition of Interracial Marriage in Utah, 1888-1963," Utah Historical Quarterly 76:2 (Spring 2008): 108–131.
- "'In Our Image, After Our Likeness': The Meaning of a Black Deity in the African American Protest Tradition, 1880–1970," in "We Will Independent Be": African-American Place Making and the Struggle to Claim Space in the United States, eds. Angel David Nieves and Leslie M. Alexander (Boulder: University of Colorado Press, 2008), 463–487.
- "Anti-Jewish Violence in the New South," Southern Jewish History 8 (2005): 77–119.
- "The Possibilities of Mormon Peacebuilding," Dialogue: A Journal of Mormon Thought 37:1 (Spring 2004): 12-45 – winner of Dialogue's Best Article in Its Category Prize (2005).
- "Traditions of Violence: Early Mormon and Anti-Mormon Conflict in Its American Setting," in Richard L. Bushman, ed., Archive of Restoration Culture Summer Fellows' Papers, 2000-2002 (Provo, UT: Joseph Fielding Smith Institute for Latter-day Saint History, 2005), 163–185.
