= Kathryn M. Daynes =

American historian (born 1946)

- Born: 1946 (age 79–80)
- Education: DePauw University; Indiana University Bloomington (MA, PhD)
- Occupation: Historian of Mormonism
- Organization: Mormon History Association
- Spouse: Byron Daynes

Kathryn M. "Kathy" Daynes (born 1946) is a professor of history at Brigham Young University (BYU) and a historian of Mormonism, specializing in Mormon polygamy. She was president of the Mormon History Association in 2008 and 2009.

Daynes was born in 1946 and began her studies as an undergraduate at BYU in 1964. However, she interrupted her studies and resumed them about ten years later at DePauw University, where she received her bachelor's degree in history. She then went on to receive an M.A. and a Ph.D. in history, both from Indiana University Bloomington, completing the latter in 1991. Daynes has been an instructor or faculty member at BYU since 1991 and retired 2013.

Daynes is married to Byron (Bill) Daynes, a professor of political science at BYU. They are the parents of three children. Daynes was appointed the director of the Center for Family History and Genealogy at BYU in 2007.

== Writings ==
Daynes is the author of the book More Wives than One: Transformation of the Mormon Marriage System, 1840-1910. Among her major articles are "Annual Tax Rolls from the Revolution to 1850: Mining Deep for Genealogical Gold" in the Genealogical Journal 28, number 4 (December 2000), "Single Men in Polygamous Society: Male Marriage Patterns in Manti, Utah" in Journal of Mormon History 24 (Spring 1998), pages 89–111 and Family Ties: Belief and Practice in Nauvoo in the John Whitmer Historical Association Journal, 8 (1988) pages 63–75.

In addition to her studies on Mormon polygamy and its social aspects, Daynes has written on broader topics in the history of families and marriage in the United States.

== Sources ==
- Daynes' vita
- Center for Family History and Genealogy newsletter
