= Patheos =

Non-denominational online media company focusing on religion

- Website type: Religion and spirituality
- Available in: English
- Founded: September 2008
- Headquarters: Englewood, Colorado, {{{location_country}}}
- Founders: Leo and Cathie Brunnick
- Website: www.patheos.com
- Launched: May 2009; 17 years ago
- Current status: Active

Patheos is a non-denominational, non-partisan online media company providing information and commentary from various, mostly religious, perspectives.

Upon its launch in May 2009, the website was primarily geared toward learning about religions through a reference library and other peer-reviewed resources on 27 global religions and worldviews. In its current form, the site also hosts more than 450 blogs in eleven "Faith Channels," offering commentary and news from these perspectives on topics including politics, institutions, culture, sacred texts, history, lifestyle, entertainment, family life, and business.

== History ==
Patheos was founded in 2008 by Leo and Cathie Brunnick, both web technology professionals and residents of Denver, Colorado. They amassed hundreds of essays and works from scholars, practitioners, and religious leaders, shaping them into a comprehensive peer-reviewed Library. As the site developed, bloggers and columnists from various traditions were added to the format.

The name Patheos is a portmanteau of "path" and "theos", the Greek word for god.

In November 2015, Patheos served over 30 million content page views, making it the largest English-language religion website in the world.

In September 2016, Patheos was acquired by BN Media, LLC. In 2021, BN Media LLC announced that the company would be doing business as Radiant.

Patheos used to include an active nonreligious channel as well. However, after the acquisition, the nonreligious bloggers were told that they could no longer publish posts on the platform that were negative or critical of others' religions or politics. As this was a significant change in editorial policy, most of them departed.

== Content ==
In an early interview, Leo Brunnick described the site's intention as a middle ground between dry academic sites, "gimmicky" popular sites, and faith-based sites that are passionate and knowledgeable but biased toward a single perspective. Its Religion Library is intended for students of religion in school or home settings and includes a "Comparison Lens" feature to compare and contrast elements in different religious traditions, including the origins, development, beliefs, rituals, ethics, and community of each tradition.

Patheos hosts eleven "Faith Channels" (Nonreligious, Buddhist, Catholic, Evangelical, Hindu, Jewish, Mormon, Muslim, Pagan, Progressive Christian, and Spirituality), providing commentary from their respective faith communities through more than 450 blogs and columns. Contributors include professors, journalists, authors, activists, and religious leaders.

There are also several topical Channels, including: Entertainment (reviews of movies, television, theater, art, and pop culture); Family (focusing on parenting, marriage, and family issues); Preachers (with sermon tips and biblical exegesis); and Faith and Work (addressing career, vocation, economics, politics, and more).

Patheos Book Club features sponsored material on new releases in religious publishing, including excerpts, book reviews, author Q&As, interviews, and roundtable discussions.

Patheos Public Square is a monthly symposium that poses a single question of timely and general interest, inviting internal and external contributors to shape responses from their own religious perspectives. Past topics have included the Future of World Religions; America and Civil Religion; Faith Communities and the Alleviation of Poverty; Political Engagement and Culture Wars; Politics in the Pulpit; Abortion; and Religion and the Environment.

Patheos Press publishes ebooks and print books on religious topics; Patheos Ad Network provides revenue and advertising management to other websites; and Patheos Labs offers web services and design, creative content development, new media strategies, and technology facilitation.

In June 2014, Patheos began a partnership with TIME.com to provide select religion and spirituality content for the site.

== Reception ==
Time magazine called the materials on Patheos "streamlined" and "reader-friendly". Religion News Service described it as "a more cerebral approach to what Beliefnet's been doing for nearly a decade". Patheos was featured as one of "21 Ways to Be Smarter in 2011" by Newsweek.

The site's advertising model has raised questions for some bloggers.

In January 2021, a comedic blog on Patheos called Laughing in Disbelief published a satirical story reporting that Iceland had made religion illegal and labelled it a mental disorder, placing warning signs on Bibles and banned Christian tourists from traveling to certain places within the country. However, some social media users mistook the satire to be factual and erroneously spread the "story" on social media.
