= Utah Historical Quarterly =

- Discipline: History of Utah
- Language: English
- Edited by: Holly George

Publication details
- History: 1928-present
- Publisher: University of Illinois Press for the Utah State Historical Society (United States)
- Frequency: Quarterly

Standard abbreviations
- ISO 4: Utah Hist. Q.

Indexing
- ISSN: 0042-143X (print); 2642-8652 (web)
- OCLC no.: 1713705

Links
- Journal homepage

Utah Historical Quarterly is a quarterly academic journal from the Utah State Historical Society (published through the University of Illinois) that discusses Utah history. The journal's publishing society is itself a division of the Utah state government's Department of Cultural & Community Engagement. The scholarly journal has articles, book reviews, photos, and documents. Articles that have received media attention include ones on Utah slavery, the history of Utah's black-owned businesses, and forced sterilization of children in Utah.
