= W. Paul Reeve =

American historian (born 1968)

W. Paul Reeve (born July 27, 1968) is an American historian and Simmons Professor of Mormon Studies and History in the History Department at the University of Utah. He became chair of the History Department on 1 July 2022.

Reeve is an influential scholar of Mormon race history and Utah history.

== Early life and education ==
Reeve was born in Hurricane, Utah. He holds a B.A. and M.A. from Brigham Young University and a Ph.D. in history from the University of Utah, where he studied with Dean L. May.

== Career ==
Prior to teaching at the University of Utah, Reeve taught at Southern Virginia University and Salt Lake Community College.

Reeve oversees the digital project Century of Black Mormons, which identifies Black Mormons across the United States and internationally who were baptized into the Church of Jesus Christ between 1830 and 1930. Alongside Reeve, "independent historian" Ardis E. Parshall contributes to the Century of Black Mormons project.

Reeve has been the recipient of the University of Utah's Early Career Teaching Award, and the College of Humanities' Ramona W. Cannon Award for Teaching Excellence in the Humanities. In 2016, the Utah Council for Social Studies named him University Teacher of the Year.

His book Religion of a Different Color was the winner of the Mormon History Association's Best Book Award, the John Whitmer Historical Association's Smith-Pettit Best Book Award, and the Utah State Historical Society's Francis Armstrong Madsen Best History Book Award.

== Bibliography ==
- Reeve, W. Paul (2006). Making Space On the Western Frontier: Mormons, Miners, and Southern Paiutes. Urbana: University of Illinois Press. ISBN 978-0-252-09226-8. OCLC 811409102.
- Mormonism: A Historical Encyclopedia. W. Paul Reeve, Ardis E. Parshall. Santa Barbara, Calif.: ABC-CLIO. 2010. ISBN 978-1-59884-108-4. OCLC 699490059.
  - Mormonism: A Historical Encyclopedia was released in 2010. The book was co-edited by W. Paul Reeve and Ardis E. Parshall. Mormonism: A Historical Encyclopedia addresses historical topics surrounding the Church of Jesus Christ of Latter-day Saints.
- Reeve, W. Paul Reeve; Van Wagenen, Michael (2011). Between Pulpit and Pew: The Supernatural World in Mormon History and Folklore. Logan: Utah State University Press. ISBN 978-0-87421-823-7. OCLC 741614045.
- Reeve, W. Paul (July 10, 2015). "Religion of a Different Color: Race and the Mormon Struggle for Whiteness". Oxford University Press. doi:10.1093/acprof:oso/9780199754076.001.0001. ISBN 978-0-19-975407-6 – via University Press Scholarship.
- Reeve, W. Paul (2023). Let's Talk About Race and Priesthood. Deseret Book.
