= Church History Library =

Library in Salt Lake City, Utah, U.S.

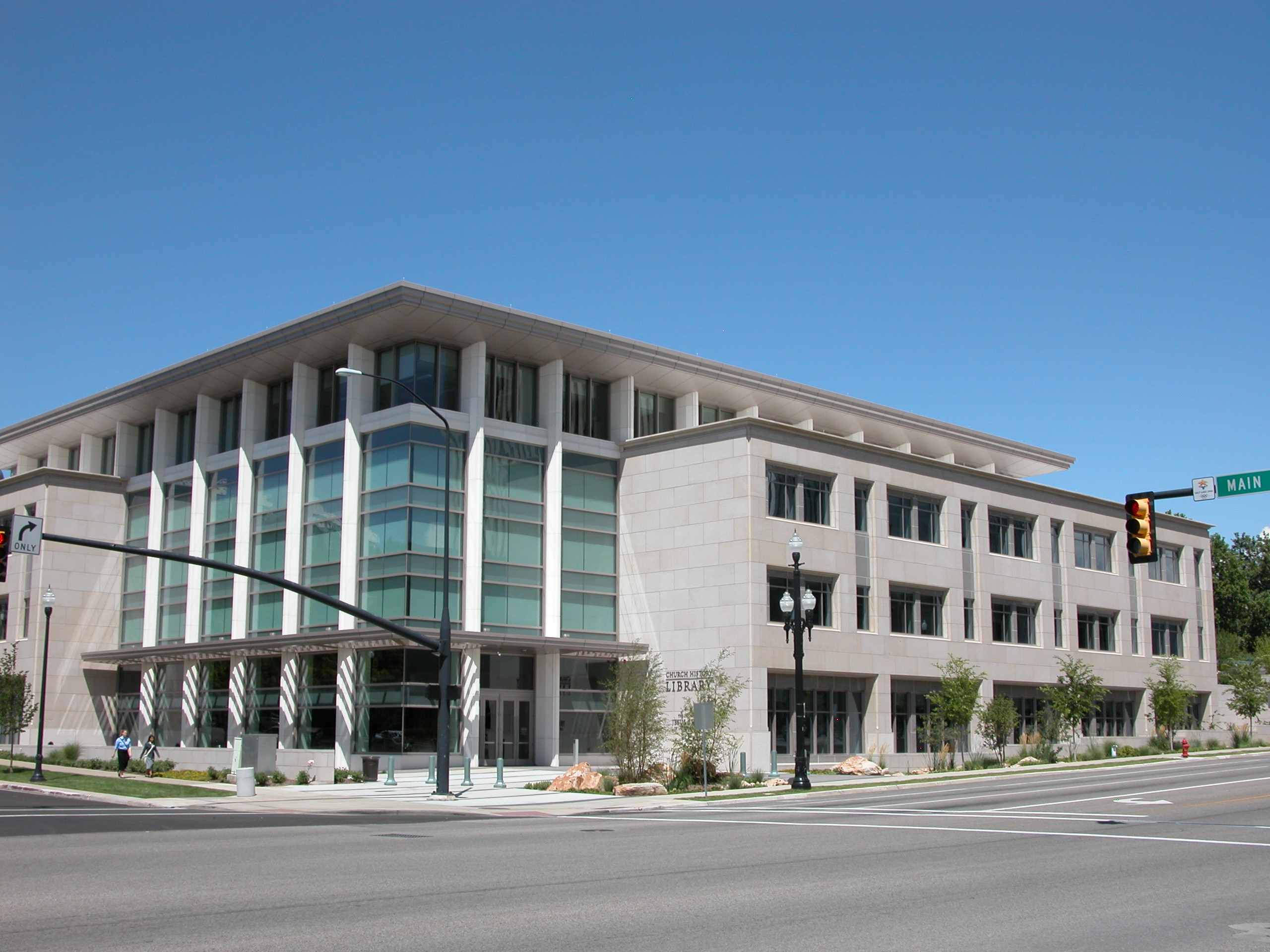
- LDS Church History Library
- 40.7721°N 111.8904°W
- Location: Salt Lake City, Utah, United States
- Type: Religious library
- Scope: The Church of Jesus Christ of Latter-day Saints
- Established: 2009

Other information
- Parent organization: The Church of Jesus Christ of Latter-day Saints
- Website: Official website

The Church History Library (CHL) is a research center and archives building housing materials chronicling the history of the Church of Jesus Christ of Latter-day Saints (LDS Church). The library is owned by the Church and opened in 2009 in downtown Salt Lake City, Utah.

== History ==
A new archives building was originally planned in 1960, as an 11-story home for the offices and libraries of the Church Historian and Recorder and the Genealogical Society of Utah. The need for such large facilities diminished due to advances in modern document preservation, as well as with the 1963 completion of the Granite Mountain Records Vault, which had vast storage for genealogical materials. Following the completion of the Church Office Building in 1972, the church's Historical Department resided in the four floors of the east wing.

In April 2005, plans were announced to construct a new CHL, to be completed in late 2007. The site was then a Temple Square parking lot, and was the same site as in the 1960 plan, northeast of the intersection of Main and North Temple. The new facility houses the Church History Department (the modern name of the Church Historian's Office) and the church's historical archives. The building was dedicated on June 20, 2009. The building opened to the public on June 22, 2009, with extended hours, improved technology, assistance staff, and additional educational and training programs.

== Collections ==
The CHL preserves materials related to the history of the Church, from the 1820s in upstate New York, to the current day, with more than 16 million members around the world.

The historical materials of the Church contain rich information about both Mormon history and the development of the western United States. These collections include:

- 270,000 books, pamphlets, magazines, manuals
- 500,000 historic photographs, posters, maps
- 23,000 audio and video recordings
- 120,000 local histories for Church units
- 150,000 journals, diaries, papers, and manuscripts
- 20,000 rolls of microfilm
- 3.5 million patriarchal blessings for Church members

== Facilities ==
The new 230,000-square-foot (21,000 m^{2}) building provides temperature, humidity, and air quality control for the church's historical collections. Materials are stored in two types of archival storage rooms. The 10 main storage rooms are kept at 55 °F (13 °C) with 35 percent relative humidity. There are also two special rooms that will be kept at minus four degrees Fahrenheit for color motion picture films, photographs, and records of special significance.

The building has areas for conservation, collection development, and research. The church's conservation efforts involve 300 to 500 books and documents and 3,000 to 4,000 audiovisual recordings every year. Collections development staff acquire and catalog 500 to 700 new collections annually, including 6,000 publications. Other staff members housed in the new building will be responsible for publications, historic sites, and web content.

In 2005, the CHL applied to be certified through the Leadership in Energy and Environmental Design (LEED) rating system, the national standard for the design, construction, and operation of environmentally friendly buildings. In 2009, the CHL received LEED certification.

== Public services ==
All research facilities opened to the public on June 22, 2009. Some resources are also available online, including the Mormon Pioneer Overland Travel database. This database is the most complete listing of LDS pioneer emigrants and companies who traveled to Utah from 1847 through 1868.

In September 2010, the CHL began posting some of their digital collections online in partnership with the Internet Archive. Currently the library is working on getting many of their pre-1923 (Public domain) collections digitized and available to a worldwide audience on the Internet Archive and through Brigham Young University's digital collections.
