= A Believing People =

1974 anthology by Richard H. Cracroft and Neal E. Lambert

A Believing People: Literature of the Latter-day Saints, edited by Richard H. Cracroft and Neal E. Lambert, and published in 1974, was "the first significant anthology of the literature of the Latter-day Saints" and began the establishment of the field of Mormon literature as a legitimate discipline, and remains, according to A Motley Vision in 2012, " the only comprehensive Mormon Literature anthology ever published." Cracroft and Lambert released an anthology with a more modern focus, 22 Young Mormon Writers, the following year. (Note: Three writers appear in both A Believing People and 22 Young Mormon Writers: Ann Doty, Clifton Holt Jolley, and Linda Sillitoe.)

== Included authors ==
The collection includes works of many sorts (letters, poetry, sermons, etc.), mostly from LDS authors, but also some by those friendly to the Mormons (e.g. Thomas L. Kane) or with early-life connections (e.g. Ina Coolbrith) or similarly tangential relationships. Authors are listed alphabetically. Works without a listed author are not reflected in this list.

=== History ===
- Lucy Mack Smith
- Joseph Smith Jr.
- B. H. Roberts
- Thomas L. Kane
- Leonard J. Arrington
- James E. Talmage

=== Biography and Autobiography ===
- Parley P. Pratt
- John Taylor
- Daniel W. Jones
- S. A. Kenner
- Florence A. Merriam Bailey
- Karl G. Maeser
- Juanita Brooks

=== Letters ===
- Joseph Smith Jr.
- Brigham Young
- Ursulia B. Hascall
- Irene Hascall Pomeroy
- Ellen Spencer Clawson

=== Journals and Diaries ===
- Hosea Stout
- William Clayton
- Mary Goble Pay
- Priddy Meeks
- Joseph Smith Black

=== Discourses ===
- Joseph Smith Jr.
- Brigham Young
- Orson Pratt
- J. Golden Kimball
- B. H. Roberts
- Gordon B. Hinckley

=== The Essay ===
- Orson F. Whitney
- William Mulder
- Parley A. Christensen
- Robert K. Thomas
- Hugh Nibley
- Truman G. Madsen
- Edward Geary

=== Nineteenth-Century Poetry ===
- William W. Phelps
- Joseph Smith Jr.
- John Lyon
- Joel H. Johnson
- Eliza R. Snow
- Parley P. Pratt
- Cyrus H. Wheelock
- William Clayton
- John Jaques
- Charles W. Penrose
- Richard Smyth
- Ina Coolbrith
- Augusta Joyce Crocheron
- Joseph L. Townsend
- Orson F. Whitney
- Josephine Spencer

=== Twentieth-Century Poetry ===
- S. Dilworth Young
- Vesta Pierce Crawford
- Christie Lund Coles
- Veneta Leatham Nielsen
- Arthur Henry King
- Edward L. Hart
- Marden J. Clark
- Lael W. Hill
- May Swenson
- Clinton F. Larson
- Max Golightly
- R. Paul Cracroft
- Emma Lou Thayne
- John Sterling Harris
- David L. Wright
- Thomas Asplund
- Harrison Davis
- Nolyn Hardy
- Marilyn McMeen Miller
- Robert A. Christmas
- Carol Lynn Pearson
- Charis Southwell
- Clifton Holt Jolley
- Dennis Drake
- Dennis Marden Clark
- Helen Walker Jones
- Linda Sillitoe
- Ann Doty
- Naomi W. Randall

=== Fiction ===
- Parley P. Pratt
- Josephine Spencer
- Nephi Anderson
- Virginia Sorensen
- Eileen G. Kump
- Douglas H. Thayer
- Donald R. Marshall

=== The Novel ===
- Nephi Anderson
- Vardis Fisher
- Maurine Whipple

=== Drama ===
- Clinton F. Larson
- Martin Kelly
