= Priddy Meeks =

American physician (1795–1886)

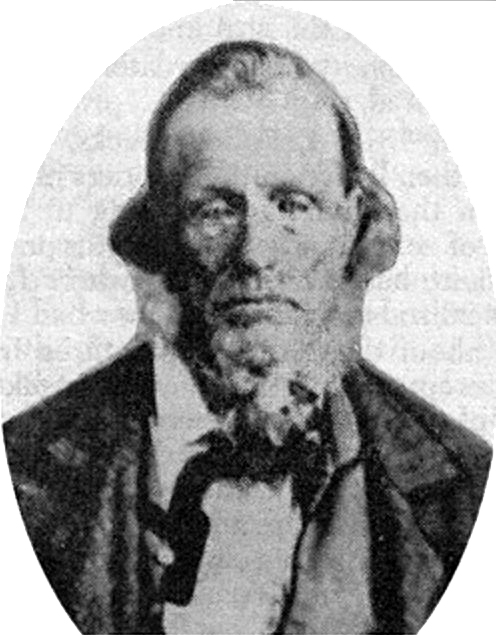

Personal details
- Born: August 29, 1795; Greenville, South Carolina, United States
- Died: July 30, 1886 (aged 90); Orderville, Utah Territory, United States
- Resting place: Orderville Cemetery; 37.2722°N 112.6367°W
- Spouse(s): Mary "Polly" Bartlett Meeks; Sarah Mahurin Meeks; Mary Jane McCleve Meeks
- Children: 19

Priddy Meeks (August 29, 1795 – July 30, 1886) was an American frontier doctor who practiced Thomsonian medicine. He was a polygamist member of the Church of Jesus Christ of Latter-day Saints and helped settle areas in Utah as a Mormon pioneer. Meeks was the first doctor in Southern Utah. He occasionally appears as a character in Mormon literature, such as the short story "They Did Go Forth" by Maurine Whipple.

== Early life ==
Priddy Meeks was born in 1795. His father, Athe Meeks, moved the family from South Carolina to Grayson County, Kentucky when Meeks was about two or three years old. The family lived there for about 12 years, until they moved to Indiana. Athe Meeks was killed by Native Americans in 1812. After the Native American attack on the family, they moved to French Island, Indiana on the Ohio River. Meeks was married and owned a farm.

Meeks was inspired to become a doctor after helping many of the sick in his community during one particularly "sickly season". He had not studied medicine, but had helped more than doctors had. He learned medicine from James Miller and Thomson's New Guide to Health, and practiced in his community. He used various elements of Thomsonian medicine like steam baths and vegetable remedies. Meeks prescribed natural remedies like cayenne pepper or dandelions to cure various ailments. He also created Dr. Meeks' Female Relief Pills, which were intended for common use to improve health in not only females, but males as well. Meeks also recorded that he confronted devils, evil spirits, and saw an angel.

Meeks moved from Indiana to Illinois in 1833 with his family. He became a member of the Church of Jesus Christ of Latter Day Saints in 1840. After becoming a member, he moved to Nauvoo, Illinois and stayed there until 1846. In 1845, however, when he was returning home from a business trip, Meeks was captured by a mob and put in the same jail in Carthage, Illinois where Joseph Smith and Hyrum Smith were martyred.

== Life in the West ==
In 1847, he traveled with the Jedediah M. Grant-Joseph B. Noble Company when he was 51. The wagon company traveled with 171 individuals from the Elkhorn River, which is outside of Winter Quarters, Nebraska. They left on June 19 and arrived in the Salt Lake Valley on October 2. During their journey, however, Meeks administered to the sick. He recorded in his journal that several members of the company had diphtheria. He recorded other hardships as well, including losing 62 cattle to a stampede.

Meeks remained in Salt Lake City, where he became a well-known doctor. When he could not visit his patients, it was said that he would send a messenger to tell them to "jump all over the city creek, crawl back into your tent and cover up warm". Under the direction of Willard Richards, Meeks served as president and founding member of the newly formed Society of Health with two other doctors in the area, William A. Morse and Phineas Richards. The council administered to the sick while also educating the people on illness.

Having been called to help settle and strengthen the area from Native American attacks, Priddy Meeks traveled with Brigham Young to Parowan, Utah in May 1851. He became the first doctor in Southern Utah. He spent 10 years in Parowan and practiced herbal medicine. He was invited by the president of the city, John C. L. Smith, to go on an expedition to explore Long Valley in June 1852. Meeks also helped the community by building cabins. His own cabin there is preserved by the Parowan Heritage Foundation as the last pioneer farmstead remaining in the area. It is listed on the Register of Historical Sites.

Meeks left Parowan to live in Harrisburg, Utah in 1861. His family also helped found settlements in Glendale (then called Berryville) in 1864 and Mount Carmel in 1864. He later moved to Orderville, Utah in 1879. He continued to practice medicine in Orderville, and even gave classes to midwives and those aspiring to be doctors.

== Personal life ==
Meeks married Mary Bartlett in 1815. They had four children together. Mary died in Indiana, and three years later Meeks married Sarah Mahurin Smith on December 14, 1826. He and Sarah had five children. Meeks bought a young girl, three or four years old, from a group of Native Americans in Parowan. He called her Lucy and raised her as his own child.

When Meeks was 62 and married to Sarah, he left Parowan determined to find a second wife. When he left his home, Sarah told him, "Don't you come back without another wife". He married Mary Jane McCleve, then 17 years old. They were sealed on November 12, 1856. The couple went on to have 10 children together.

== In popular culture ==
Meeks occasionally appears as a character in Mormon literature, such as the short story "They Did Go Forth" by Maurine Whipple. Excerpts of his journal were included in the seminal Mormon anthology A Believing People.
