= John D. T. McAllister =

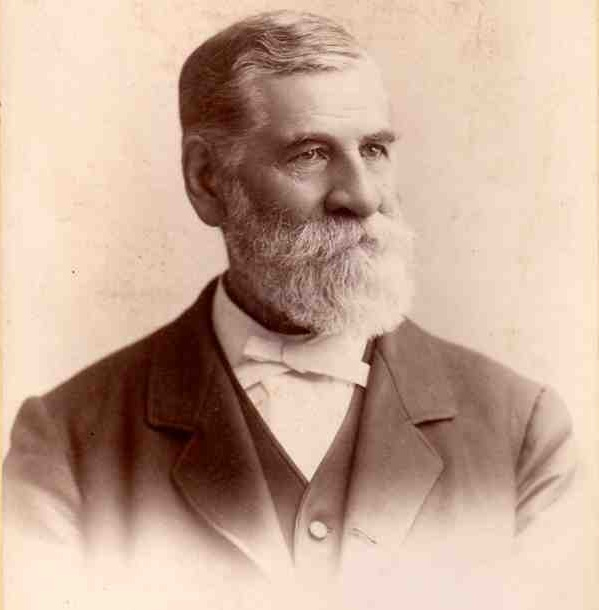
"J D T" McAllister about 1870

John Daniel Thompson McAllister (February 19, 1827 – January 21, 1910) was a 19th-century regional leader of the Church of Jesus Christ of Latter-day Saints (LDS Church).

== Biography ==
McAllister was born in Lewis, Sussex County, Delaware. In 1844 he moved to Philadelphia.

McAllister was baptized a member of the LDS Church in 1847. He married Ellen Handley in 1848. They then moved to St. Louis, Missouri where he worked as a blacksmith. In 1850, he moved to Council Bluffs, Iowa where he worked as a store clerk and then moved to Salt Lake City, Utah Territory in 1851.

In Salt Lake City, McAllister helped build the Old Tabernacle and was a member of Ballo's brass band. He left on a mission to England and Ireland in early 1853. In 1855, McAllister was serving as an LDS Church missionary in Belfast. He returned to the United States in 1856, and helped organize the handcart companies at Iowa City. While in Ireland, he composed "The Handcart Song", which he wrote to motivate other LDS members to immigrate to Utah.

After returning to Utah Territory with a handcart company, McAllister was appointed a major in the Nauvoo Legion. He also was a member of the Deseret Dramatic Association. He then served another mission, both in the United States and Europe from 1860 to 1862. McAllister's first stop on this mission was in his place of baptism, Philadelphia, where he was able to convince many of the Latter Day Saints it was time to move to the west. He also baptized the family of his brother, Richard Wesley McAllister. He was the head of a pioneer company in 1862. In 1861 he made a journey to Utah Territory with his mother. He made a final return to Utah Territory in 1862.

After his return to Utah, McAllister served as Salt Lake City and later Utah Territorial Marshall and as superintendent of Brigham Young's woolen mills. In 1877 McAllister was appointed president of the LDS Church's St. George Stake. He also served as the Brigadier General for the Utah militia in Washington County, Utah.

McAllister was first counselor to Wilford Woodruff in the presidency of the St. George Temple when it opened. During this time he baptized Wilford Woodruff as proxy for the founding fathers of the United States. He also worked closely with Woodruff in beginning the performance of endowments on behalf of the dead.

McAllister served as president of the St. George Temple from 1884 to 1893 and then as president of the Manti Temple from 1893 to 1906. In 1889 McAllister surrendered to U.S. Marshals who had been seeking him for several years on charges of recognizing and publicly acknowledging his plural wives. His lawyer in the succeeding trial was James H. Moyle. The subsequent grand jury trial held September 1889 returned a verdict of not guilty.

McAllister was married eight times.

McAllister's granddaughter Maurine Whipple based some aspects of the character Abijah MacIntyre from her novel The Giant Joshua on McAllister.
