= Molit =

Molit can refer to:

- Ministry of Land, Infrastructure and Transport (Korea)
- Mormon literature
