= Maurine Whipple =

American novelist and short story writer (1903 – 1992)

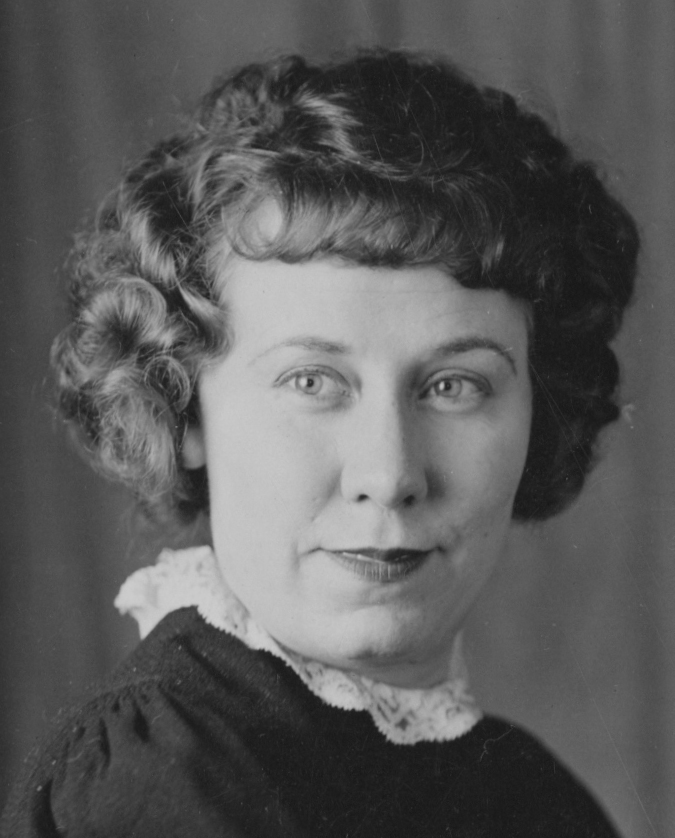
- Maurine Whipple
- Born: January 20, 1903; St. George, Utah, US
- Died: April 12, 1992 (aged 89)
- Education: B.A., University of Utah, 1926
- Occupation: Author
- Writing career
- Language: English
- Genres: Novel, short story
- Notable work: The Giant Joshua

Maurine Whipple (January 20, 1903 – April 12, 1992) was an American novelist and short story writer best known for her novel The Giant Joshua (1941). The book is lauded as one of the most important Mormon novels, vividly depicting pioneer and polygamous life in the 19th century.

Whipple grew up in St. George, Utah. She attended Dixie College, then graduated from the University of Utah with honors. She taught high school for several years in both Utah and Idaho. After attending the 1937 Rocky Mountain Writer's conference, she made connections that led to her publish The Giant Joshua with Houghton Mifflin. Afterwards, she made plans to make The Giant Joshua into a trilogy, but the two additional volumes, along with two other novels, remained unfinished at the time of her death. Although she never published any additional longer works, she published essays, short stories, and articles in various journals and periodicals.

== Early life and education ==
Maurine Whipple was born to Charles and Annie Lenzi (McAllister) Whipple on January 20, 1903, in St. George, Utah, the oldest of six children. Her parents were both children of parents in polygamous relationships. Charlie left the church during Whipple's childhood. Whipple's maternal grandmother, Cornelia Lenzi McAllister, and her fellow sister wives told Whipple stories about their lives when she was young. When she was twelve years old in 1915, Maurine's mother gave birth to her brother George and had a nervous breakdown. Maurine stayed home from school to help raise George, who suffered from eczema and other ailments and needed constant care.

In 1906, alongside his lumber yard and ice house businesses, Charlie and some business associates ran a movie theater in town. When she was old enough, Whipple worked in the theater as a janitor and popcorn girl until it closed in the Great Depression. Historian Juanita Brooks, who taught at Maurine's school when she was a senior, described her as precocious and recalled that she was the editor of the school newspaper and yearbook. As a teenager, she taught Sunday School in the Church of Jesus Christ of Latter-day Saints (LDS Church). She considered herself an active member until the 1930s.

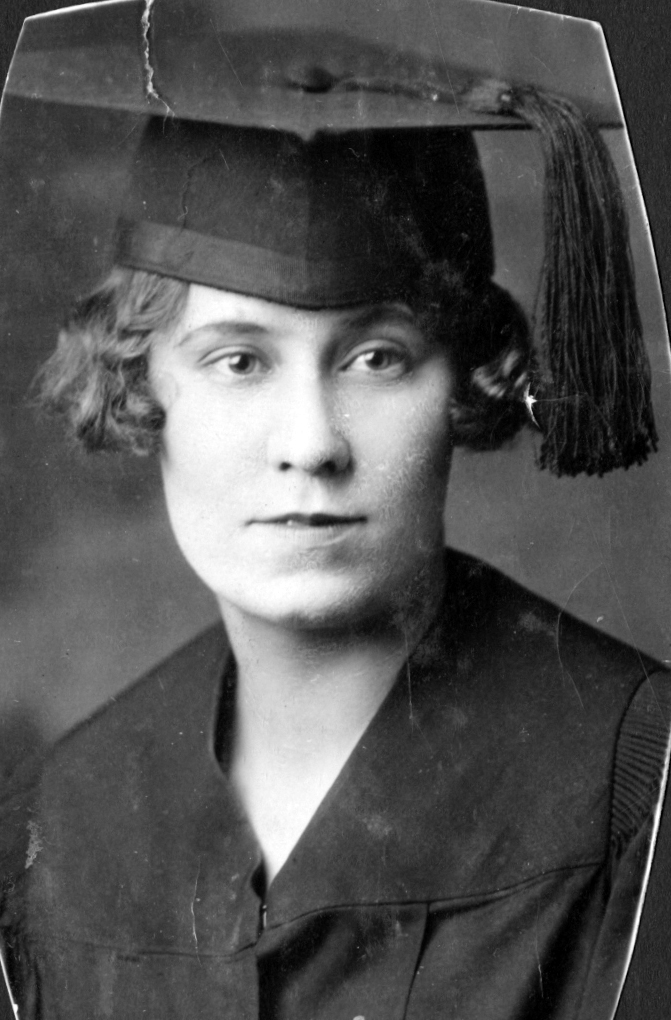
Whipple's senior photo

Whipple began her higher education at Dixie College and then transferred to the University of Utah in 1923. She stayed with family during her sophomore and junior years. Whipple boarded at the Beehive House during her senior year. She wrote short stories for her English classes and completed her student teaching, probably at Stewart Junior High. She graduated in 1926 with honors.

== Teaching ==
After graduating, Whipple taught at four different schools throughout Utah and Idaho. She often disagreed with principals over the best way to educate children. She taught first in Monroe, Utah, where she had trouble disciplining a class of boys. She was not hired for the next school year, and the principal refused to write her a letter of recommendation. She taught in Georgetown, Idaho, 1926–1927, and wrote the novella "Beaver Dam Wash" while recovering from an appendectomy. The novella featured a man who dreamed of building an oil well that would greatly profit his hometown of Beaver Dam. She was not offered a contract for the next year, and worked the following year as an aid at Dixie High School. During that summer, she staged plays in her father's theater. She taught in Virgin, Utah 1928–1929, alongside Nellie Gubler, and went to California that summer to study drama and recreational programs. In 1930, she taught in Heber City, where she organized a play to raise money for a physical education program against the principal's wishes.

In 1931, she returned to the University of Utah to take a few classes and worked in the Neighborhood House, a government-sponsored project to bring recreation to a poor neighborhood. At the beginning of 1932, she taught dance in Boulder City, Nevada. She taught for six weeks in Latuda, Utah (a town near Price), In 1937, she wanted to be part of the Cedar City Easter pageant, in hopes that it would help her get a job at the new Cedar City Branch Agricultural College. She pursued a relationship with the pageant's director, Grant Redford, but he refused her advances and also her offer to help with the pageant, which Whipple found devastating. She became severely depressed and suicidal. McQuarrie became estranged from her husband, and Whipple stayed with her while she gave birth. McQuarrie made Whipple promise to go to the Rocky Mountain Writer's Conference in Colorado.

== The Giant Joshua ==
Whipple did go to the 1937 Rocky Mountain Writer's Conference and submitted "Beaver Dam Wash". She wrote the fictionalized autobiography "Confessions of a She Devil" at the conference. At the conference, Ford Madox Ford liked "Beaver Dam Wash" and convinced Ferris Greenslet, then vice president at Houghton Mifflin, to read it. Greenslet advised Whipple to make the novella a little longer; instead, Whipple proposed a Mormon epic and sent a sample chapter. Greenslet encouraged Whipple to apply for Houghton Mifflin's $1,000 literary fellowship for new writers working on their first novel. Whipple lived with her parents while she wrote the chapters for the fellowship application, often getting inspiration right before falling asleep and working through the night. Greenslet helped her to apply for the fellowship, and she won the 1938 Houghton Mifflin Literary Fellowship. She went to Boston to accept the prize. Greenslet greatly encouraged Whipple while she wrote The Giant Joshua over the next three years. He constantly gave her advice, personally lent her money, and made it possible for her to stay at the artist colony Yaddo to finish her book. Although Whipple disliked Yaddo, complaining that she felt lonely and isolated, she completed much writing there. Joseph Walker, an ex-Mormon doctor from St. George living in Hollywood, read early manuscripts and wrote Whipple encouraging letters. Whipple was concerned that her work comparing unfavorably with Vardis Fisher's, but both Walker and Greenslet told her that her writing was better than his. She wrote the manuscript in longhand and had others type it up for her.

After its publication, The Giant Joshua was not very profitable to Whipple. As a fellowship winner, the accompanying contract was not generous, and Whipple received advances on her royalty checks to finish the novel. Whipple also hired a literary agent, Maxim Liber, just after the publication of The Giant Joshua, and Liber took a percentage of money due to her. She fired him that August. The Giant Joshua sold well. It was fifth in a list of ten in Harper's Poll of the Critics and was second in The Denver Post's list of bestsellers.

The Giant Joshua is widely considered the greatest Mormon novel. It depicts the 1861 settling of St. George as part of Brigham Young's Dixie Mission with the physical, emotional, and mental difficulties of pioneer life and polygamy. The book presents plural marriage as a test of faith similar to colonizing Utah's desert. Historian Juanita Brooks helped Whipple with historical details in The Giant Joshua, though Brooks was disappointed at the historical inaccuracies Whipple kept in the novel. More recent critics describe the novel as "firmly grounded in [its] historical milieu". Whipple was inspired by her own family history and family stories from the Beckstrom family and Annie Atkin, who grew up in St. George and later married Vasco Tanner. The novel was well-received outside of Utah, and inspired fans who sent Whipple letters expressing their love for her epic novel. Ray B. West in the Saturday Review of Literature wrote that the book, "is excellent reading and it catches a previously neglected side of the Mormon story—the tenderness and sympathy which existed among a people dogged by persecution and hardships, forced to battle an inclement nature for every morsel of food they ate and to struggle for every moment of genuine happiness.” However, The Giant Joshua did not have as positive of a reception at home in Utah. John A. Widtsoe wrote in The Improvement Era that its treatment of polygamy was unfair, and the novel was "straining for the lurid," though he praised how it showed the "epic value" of Mormon settlements. Whipple's own father called the novel vulgar.

In 1983, Whipple sold the movie rights to the book, which provided for her in her old age. In 1989, The Giant Joshua was the most-borrowed book in the Salt Lake City Public Library. In "Fifty Important Mormon Books", Curt Bench reported that Mormon scholars in 1990 unanimously chose The Giant Joshua as the best Mormon novel before 1980. In People of Paradox, Terryl Givens wrote that, "No one has succeeded better than Whipple at capturing the recurrent Mormon paradox: the independence and loneliness of an exiled people . . . making it perhaps the fullest cultural expression of the Mormon experience".

== After The Giant Joshua ==
Whipple traveled to the east coast to promote her book in January 1941. Whipple generously gave eight hundred dollars to her younger sister, whose husband was newly disabled. She also gave money to her mother Annie. By spring in 1941, due to her generosity and lack of financial management, she did not have very much money. Later Whipple stated, "I've had to send brothers through school, keep my brother-in-law in the hospital, help clothe their kids, help build their house, buy medicines for my mother, etc. Not that I'm complaining ... to me a family is important - more important than I'll ever be."

== Later work ==
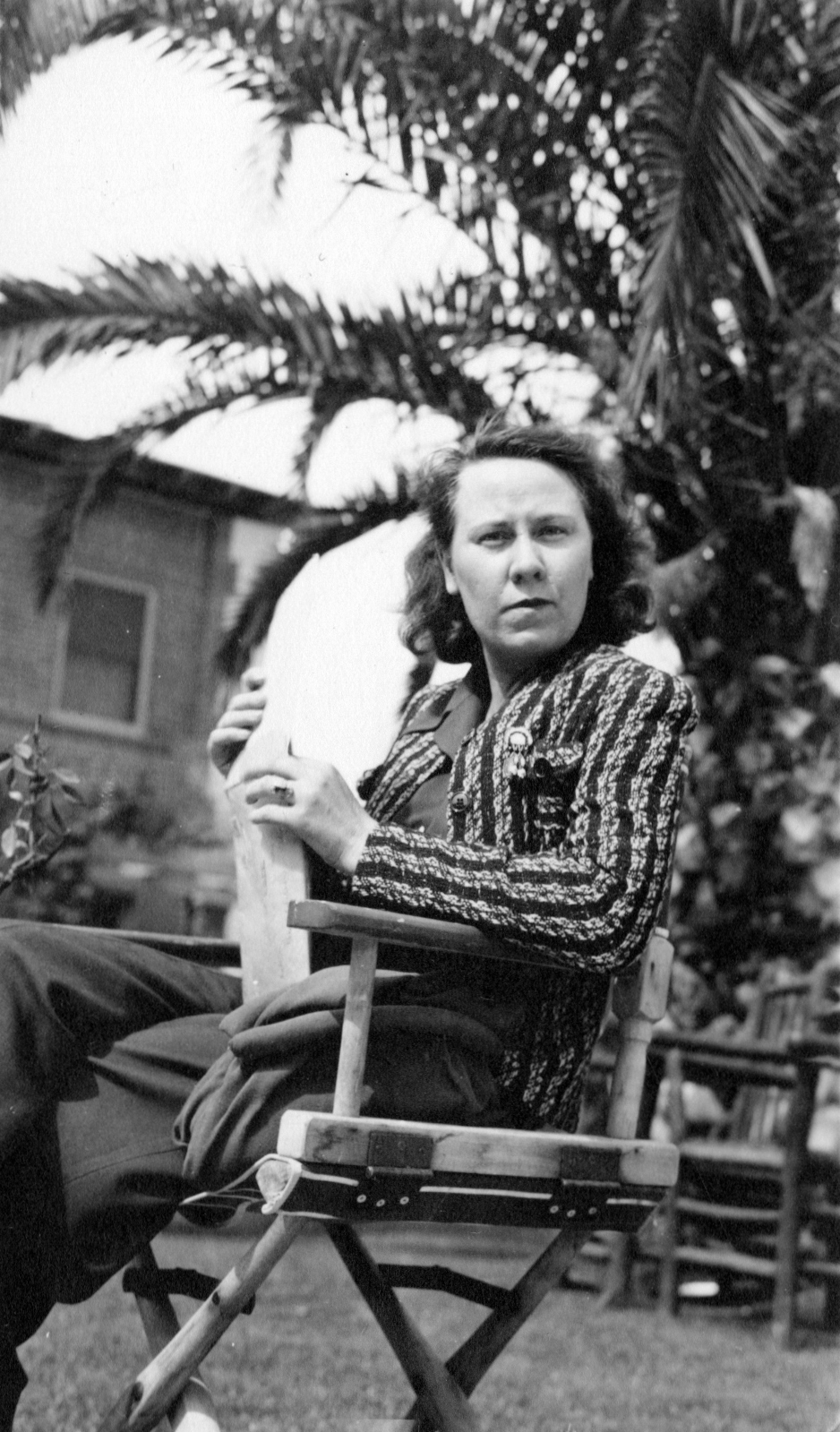
Whipple in 1954

In 1942, Whipple wrote an article on the LDS Church for Look that portrayed the LDS Church favorably, called "Meet the Mormons". In June 1942, she stayed in an apartment near historian Fawn M. Brodie in Hanover, New Hampshire, while she rewrote her concept for a Western romance novel, which she titled The Arizona Strip. The book was never finished. She gave guest lectures in cities on the west coast and midwest starting in the 1940s, with lectures supporting the war effort, until the mid 1970s. In 1943, Whipple wrote a short story set in Salt Lake City in 1918 during the Spanish Flu epidemic. A dying young wife is healed by a priesthood blessing from her husband. The story, "A Grain of Mustard," is considered one of Whipple's most positive depictions of the LDS Church.

In 1945, Whipple published a travel guide for tourists called This is the Place: Utah. In the guide, she criticized the LDS Church's use of tithing to build an expensive office building, among other things. In his review in the Saturday Review of Literature, Dale Morgan praised her skepticism and interest in people, but criticized her unattributed use of information from Utah Guide. Literary critic Harry Hansen titled his review "Mormons are Peculiar: Maurine Whipple Whips Up More About Them and Their Country." A reviewer in the Boston Herald said the book was unexpectedly entertaining. A review in The Salt Lake Tribune described Whipple as sympathetic yet objective, combining humor and logic. A review in The Chicago Sun called the book a "sales promotion" and questioned whether or not Mormons should want to be completely American. Whipple's friends praised the book to her and Elvitta Phillips, regional editor of the Spokane Daily Column told her that the book had sold out in Spokane.

Also in 1945, Whipple employed a new agent, Max Becker, who sold the still unwritten sequel to The Giant Joshua to Simon and Schuster. Becker arranged for the publisher to advance Whipple 150 dollars a month for a year while she wrote the book. Whipple planned for and wrote 200 pages of the sequel entitled Cleave the Wood. Ill health and psychological discomfort made it difficult for Whipple to settle into writing the entire book. At one point in 1947, Whipple destroyed the first one hundred pages. Whipple reports that the manuscript she wrote afterwards was stolen in 1970 when her house was robbed. She wrote sample chapters for two other novels and numerous short stories, some vehemently anti-war. Publishers declined her queries for publishing. In 1947, she wrote about Utah for Life with photographers Loomis Dean and Grant Allen. Life editor Roy Craft encouraged her work. Life approved her to work with Dean on a piece about homesteader Josie Bassett Morris; Dean sent Whipple home after arriving and finished the story without her. Due to several misunderstandings, Life stopped working with Whipple. In 1948, she spent much time and energy writing a piece on Harry Goulding for Bert MacBride to possibly publish in Reader's Digest. MacBride did not accept the piece, but sent her some money for her efforts. Whipple asked friends to write to MacBride and ask him to reconsider, which MacBride considered unprofessional. She wrote to Paul Gallico, the president of the Authors' Guild, who sent her some money to pay for living expenses. Whipple sent Gallico her piece on Goulding and her correspondence with MacBride, and Goulding advised her to improve her writing. She published articles in several other periodicals, including The Saturday Evening Post and Collier's.

== Personal life ==
Curtis Taylor admired Whipple's writing and described her personality as "vastly childlike, deeply, anciently childlike." Veda Hale, Whipple's biographer and friend, describes her personality as "paradoxical", being emotionally needy and idealistic yet distant from her family; writing voluminously, yet rarely publishing.

Whipple's father Charlie openly had affairs with other women in town, much to her mother Annie's embarrassment. Even though the 1890 Manifesto had halted new polygamous marriages, children who grew up in polygamous families felt its influence. Hale, speculates that Charlie's own father, who married a younger second wife, influenced Charlie's taking a mistress.

Whipple was frequently ill with respiratory infections. Although she suffered many real health problems, according to Hale, "almost certainly" some of her health complaints were psychosomatic.

=== Romantic relationships and trauma ===
Whipple frequently had unrequited crushes on men. She attributed her lack of romantic success to tragic accidents, war, misunderstanding, or fate. One of these crushes started in 1923 after her first year attending classes at the University of Utah. Whipple's brother Ralph had a ruptured appendix and peritonitis. Whipple acted as the doctor's assistant for the surgery. The young doctor, Clare Woodbury, was in St. George for his father's funeral, whose practice he inherited. Whipple stated that their relationship was never physically intimate. Whipple later fictionalized her meeting with Woodbury in "Confessions of a She Devil," imagining him as an "experienced seducer of young girls." The experience reappears in another short story, showing, according to Hale, her "deep sexual vulnerability" which informed her writing in The Giant Joshua. Whipple had other relationships with men, but they were not successful.

Whipple was married briefly. Around 1931, Whipple renewed her friendship with Lillian McQuarrie, who was doing research for a historical novel set in 1860s Utah. McQuarrie encouraged Whipple to "settle" for marriage, and Whipple married the recently divorced Emil de Neuf on September 14, 1932. They were divorced after four months. In 1935, she was raped during the time she taught in Latuda, Utah and subsequently had an abortion.

== Legacy ==
Appreciation for The Giant Joshua rose in the 1970s, with the beginnings of the academic study of Mormon literature. Mormon scholars such as Eugene England, Richard Cracroft, Bruce Jorgensen, Neal E. Lambert, Mary Lythgoe Bradford, and Edward A. Geary began celebrating Whipple as one of Mormonism's great novelists, and a key member of the "Mormon Lost Generation". The Giant Joshua came to be regularly taught in the curriculum of Mormon literature courses at Brigham Young University. Just before her death, two of her older stories were published in the journals Dialogue: A Journal of Mormon Thought and Sunstone Magazine. The Association for Mormon Letters awarded Whipple with a lifetime achievement award and a lifetime honorary membership in 1991, the year before her death. In 2020, many of Whipple's previously published short pieces and her unpublished writings, including the completed chapters of "Cleave the Wood", were published as A Craving for Beauty: The Collected Writings of Maurine Whipple.

== Publications ==
- A Dress for Christmas - first published in 1925 issue of Pen, the University of Utah's literary magazine. Revised in 1939 and published in the October 1991 Sunstone.
- “Quicksand”. The University Pen (University of Utah), June 1926.
- The Giant Joshua (1941)
- “Meet the Mormons”. Look, March 10, 1942.
- This is the Place: Utah (1945).
- "They Did Go forth" (short story written in 1943, published in Dialogue (journal)) Winter 1991.
- “A Mormon Family has a Reunion”. Life, October 27, 1947.
- "Josie, Queen of the Cattle Rustlers". Life, January 5, 1948.
- “Anybody’s Gold Mine”. Saturday Evening Post, October 1, 1949.
- “Arizona Strip--‘America’s Tibet’”. Collier’s, May 24, 1952.
- “The Return of St. Thomas-on-the-Muddy,“ Collier's September 20, 1952.
- “Why I Have Five Wives: A Mormon Fundamentalist Tells His Story,” Collier's, November 13, 1953.
- Review of The Francher Train by Amelia Bean. Utah Historical Quarterly, October 1959.
- “Panguitch--Big Fish“. Western Gateways: Magazine of the Golden Circle, March 1969.
- “The Overcoat”. Irreantum, 17.1. October 2020.
- “Mormon Drama”. Dialogue: A Journal of Mormon Thought, Winter 2020.

== See also ==
- LDS fiction: The Lost Generation

== Works cited ==
- Bench, Curt (October 1990). "Fifty Important Mormon Books" (PDF). Sunstone.
- Givens, Terryl C. (2007). People of paradox : a history of Mormon culture. New York: Oxford University Press. pp. 288–289, 291. ISBN 978-0195167115.
- Embry, Jessie (1994). "Maurine Whipple: The Quiet Dissenter". In Launius, Roger D.; Thatcher, Linda (eds.). Differing visions: dissenters in Mormon history. Urbana [u.a.]: Univ. of Illinois Press. ISBN 9780252020698.
- Hale, Veda Tebbs (August 1992), "In Memoriam: Maurine Whipple" (PDF), Sunstone: 14, archived from the original (PDF) on 2013-10-21
- Hale, Veda Tebbs (2011), Swell suffering: a biography of Maurine Whipple, Salt Lake City, Utah: Greg Kofford Books, ISBN 9781589581241
- Hale, Veda Tebbs (2008), Juanita Brooks Lecture Series: Maurine Whipple and her Joshua (PDF), St. George, Utah: Dixie State College of Utah
