= Songs and Flowers of the Wasatch =

1893 poetry anthology

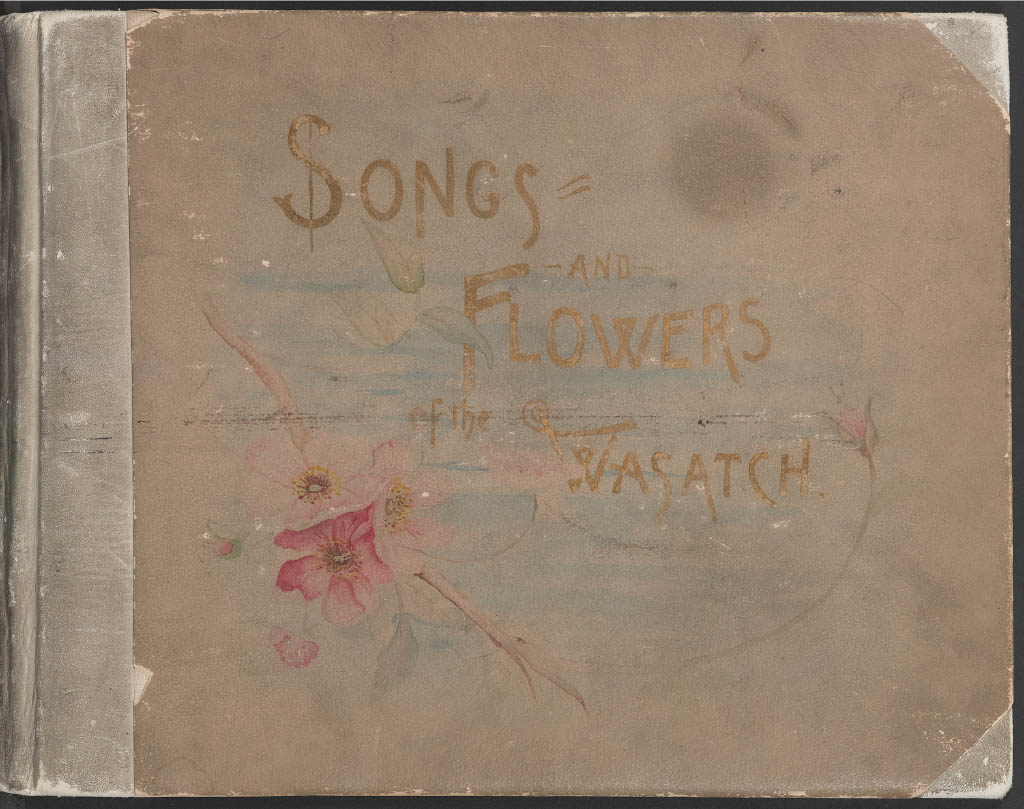
- Cover of Songs and Flowers of the Wasatch
- Editor: Emmeline B. Wells
- Illustrator: Edna Wells Sloan
- Language: English
- Genre: Poetry anthology
- Publisher: Alice Smith Merrill
- Publication date: 1893

Songs and Flowers of the Wasatch is a book of poetry edited by Emmeline B. Wells and illustrated by Edna Wells Sloan. Several copies, with hand-painted illustrations, were exhibited at the 1893 World's Columbian Exposition in the Women's Building Library and the Utah Building. Utah women poets wrote the book's thirty-four poems, which focused on Utah's landscape and Mormon theology. Reviews when the book came out focused on the book itself as an art object. Mormon historians see the book as Utah women's attempt to assimilate to cultural expectations of citizens of the United States of America.

== Publication ==
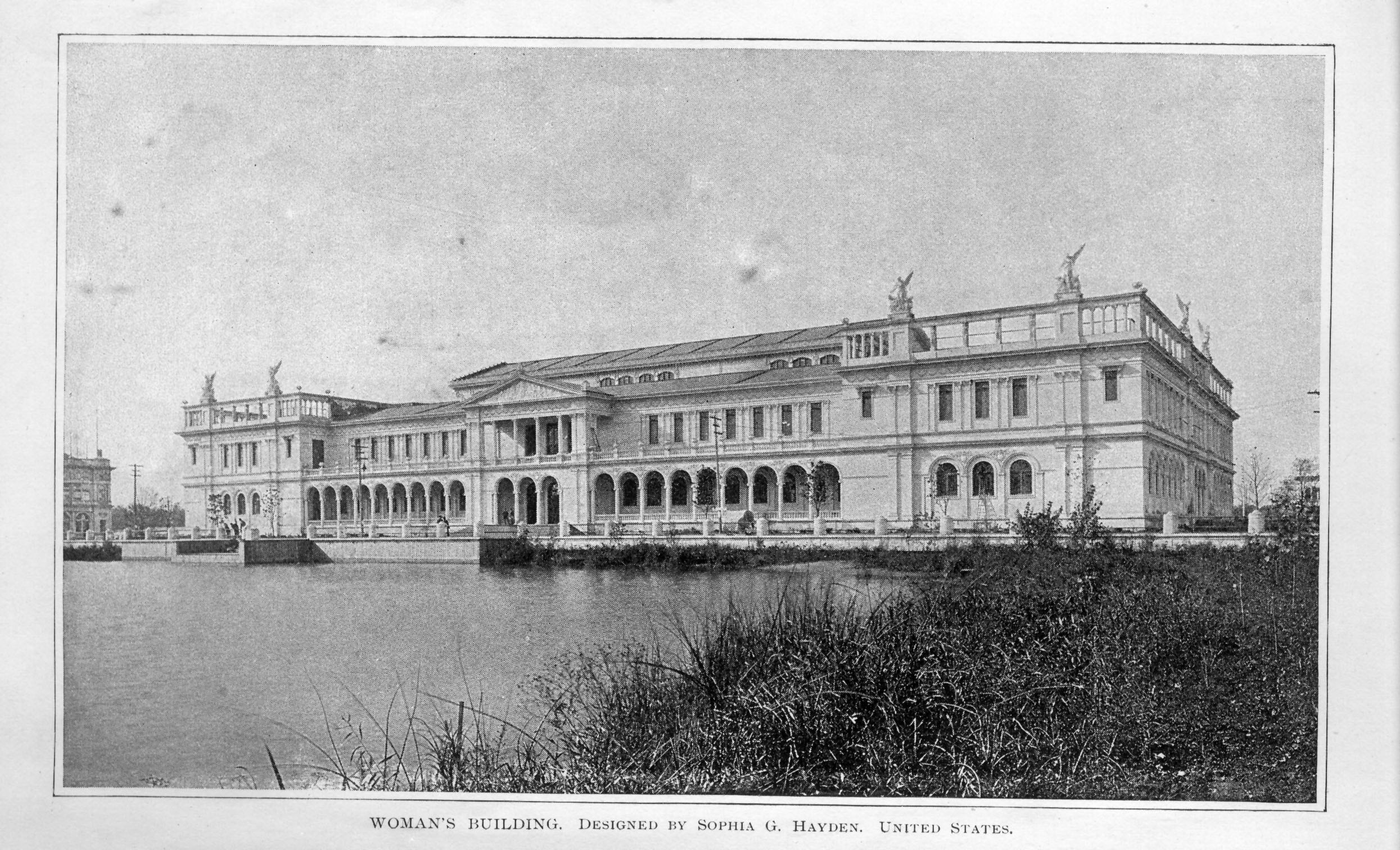
The Woman's Building at the World's Columbian Exposition.

The compilation of poetry by Utah women was created for the 1893 World's Columbian Exposition in Chicago. The Church History entry for Alice Smith Merrill lists her as the publisher for Songs and Flowers of the Wasatch. Wells mentioned three hand-painted copies of the book in her journal. Two of these initial three were on display at the World's Fair in the Woman's Building Library and in the Utah Building. Wells's copy currently resides in the BYU Library special collections and the Church History Library archives. It is possible that a third copy was on display as well: Wells's "Memoranda" refers to copies displayed in the Woman's building, in the Utah Building, and a third in the Liberal Arts in the Woman's Building. She wrote that Margaret Blaine Salisbury and Emily S. Richards received the other two copies. (Note: The copy in the Woman's building was reported to have the water color illustrations. See Home, Alice S. M. (12 October 1893). "Fruit of the Desert". Salt Lake Herald-Republican. p. 16. "in the library of the Woman's building at the exposition was a handsome book, which contained a selection from each of Utah's poets, making about thirty poems. The book is bound in white leather and decorated in water colors with the flora of Utah. The title 'Songs and Flowers of the Wasatch'." and "The Utah Room". Woman's Exponent. 1 April 1893. p. 4. ""Among these lies the beautiful volume, Songs and Flowers of the Wasatch, choice selections from the women poets of Utah, appropriate illustrated in water colors." The copy in the Utah building also had hand-painted illustrations. See "Utah at the World's Fair". Salt Lake Herald-Republican. 16 July 1893. p. 10. "The illustrations which are the work of Mrs. Edna Wells Sloan, are in water colors, and the lady is to be congratulated upon the exquisite taste and artistic execution of the work and design.") In her journal entry for June 8, 1893, she said that she "found the 2 copies of Poems Edna had left for me" and that she took one to use in the Liberal Arts building. Later on June 12, she reported going "to see about the book for Liberal Arts building". It is unclear if she left a copy there; her journal entry states that the director of the Woman's Department in the Liberal Arts Building instructed her to leave it in the organization room in the Women's building.

The Relief Society minutes from 1904 mention that more copies of the book were made in 1897. They planned to create covers for 25 of these for the National Council of Women's literature exhibit in St. Louis. The Church History Library has a copy that does not have the illustrations. Wells reported giving a copy to "Miss Baker" on July 20, 1908.

== Contents ==
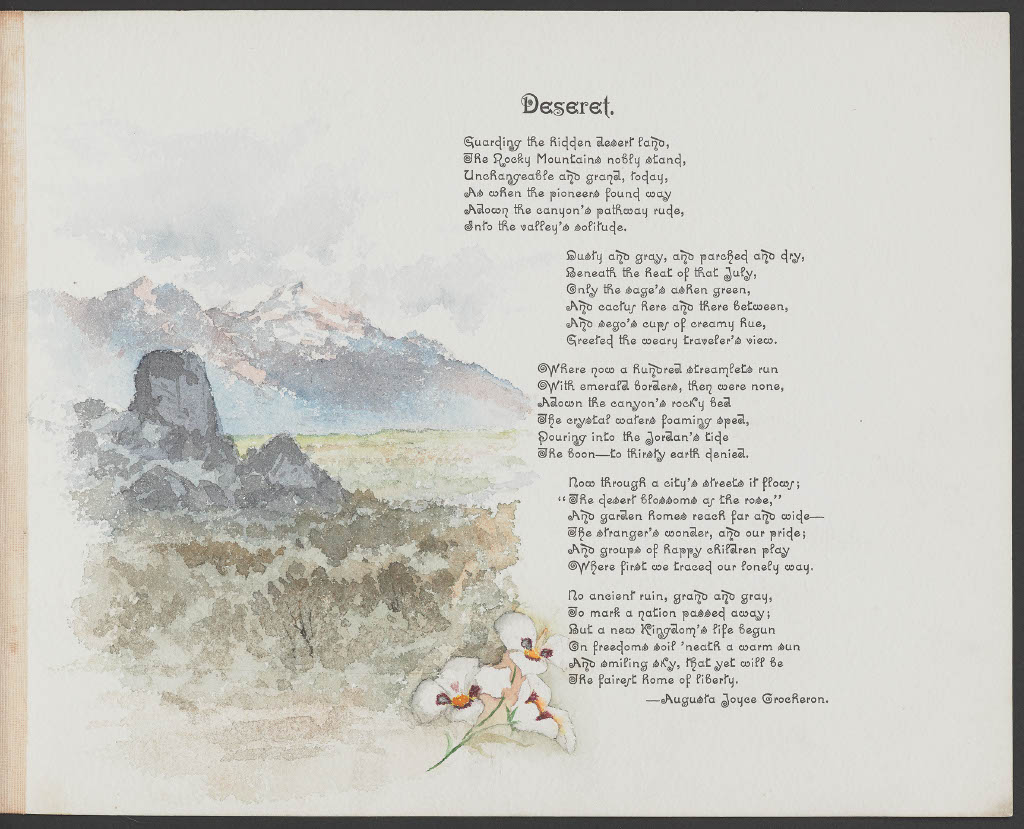
"Deseret" by Augusta Joyce Crocheron from Songs and Flowers of the Wasatch.

In her dissertation chapter on Songs and Flowers of the Wasatch, Jennifer Reeder, a women's history specialist at the LDS Church History Department wrote that the hand-painted watercolors of flowers and nature scenes that accompanied sentimental poetry appear at first like many other poetry compilations of the Victorian era. Unlike other poetry compilations, however, the content in Songs and Flowers draws on Utah's landscapes and Mormon theology. The book includes poems by many LDS women, including Ruth May Fox, Lucinda Lee Dalton, Augusta Joyce Crocheron, Lula Greene Richards, Julia McDonald, Ellis Reynolds Shipp, and Josephine Spencer. The words to the hymn "O My Father" by Eliza R. Snow are included as the first poem. In this popular poem, Snow put the idea of Heavenly parents, including Heavenly Mother, into words. (Note: The History of the YLMIA source gives an explanation for the doctrine of Heavenly Mother as originating with Joseph Smith. According to the History of the YLMIA, Zina D. H. Young told Eliza Snow that Joseph Smith assured her that she had a mother in heaven who was the wife of Heavenly Father.) A Catholic woman, Ruby Lamont, wrote "Sonnets on the Virgin Mary".

== Reception ==
Reviews of the book focused on its physical and design aspects and came from people in Utah. Writing for the Salt Lake Herald, Alice S.M. wrote that it was a "handsome book". Also at the Herald, Frances praised the book's thick paper and "unique designs", writing that "our home publishers may well be proud of the excellent work shown in the printing and binding of the volume". The Woman's Exponent, edited by Wells, called the book "something to be proud of" and having a "beautiful appearance".

== Analyses ==
Reeder wrote that the book "represented a pivotal, concerted shift away from institutional Mormon history toward a non-denominational, socially-accepted American cultural and religious heritage". According to Reid Neilson, former managing director of the LDS Church History Department, "Utah women hoped that visitors to the Utah Building, after perusing their poems, might reevaluate the refinement and sophistication of not only Utah, but also its fair daughters, heretofore viewed as subjected women and sexual slaves in a polygamous society". Neilson called the book's 34 poems "largely secular".

== Works cited ==
- Reeder, Jennifer (2013). "To Do Something Extraordinary": Mormon Women and the Creation of a Usable Past (dissertation). ProQuest 1429800911.
