= Mary Goble Pay =

Mary Goble Pay (1843–1913) was an early settler of both Nephi, Utah, and Leamington, Utah.

Born Mary Goble in Brighton, Sussex, England, on June 2, 1843, she joined the Church of Jesus Christ of Latter-day Saints along with her parents in 1855. In 1856 they traveled on the Horizon and then in Iowa City joined the Hunt Wagon Company, which traveled along with the Martin Handcart Company.

On the journey west her mother and two siblings died. She met Richard Pay, whose wife and newborn daughter had died during the journey. On arriving in Utah, Goble had her toes amputated due to frostbite. In the spring of 1859 she moved to Nephi, Utah, and shortly afterwards married Richard Pay.

During the Black Hawk War Pay learned the local Ute dialect from the wife of Pawania the head of the local Pagwats band. In 1880 the Pays moved to Leamington, Utah, where Mary served for twelve years as president of the local LDS Primary. The Pays had thirteen children. After Richard died on April 18, 1893, Mary moved back to Nephi.

Pay is an ancestor of Marjorie Pay Hinckley. The home the Pays built in Leamington was moved to This Is the Place Heritage Park in Salt Lake City in 2001.

== Sources ==
- Mary Goble Pay at the MLCA Database
- article on Pay Home
- biography of Pay
- Richard H. Cracroft and Neal E. Lambert (ed.), A Believing People: Literature of The Latter-day Saints. (Provo: Brigham Young University Press, 1974) p. 143-50.
