= David O. McKay =

American LDS Church leader (1873–1970)

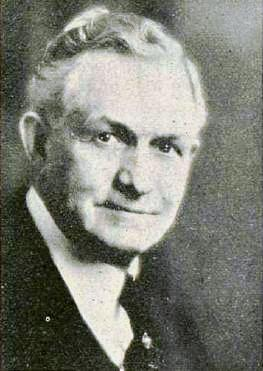

9th President of the Church of Jesus Christ of Latter-day Saints
- April 9, 1951 – January 18, 1970
- Predecessor: George Albert Smith
- Successor: Joseph Fielding Smith

President of the Quorum of the Twelve Apostles (with Joseph Fielding Smith as Acting President)
- August 8, 1950 – April 9, 1951
- Predecessor: George F. Richards
- Successor: Joseph Fielding Smith
- End reason: Became President of the Church

Second Counselor in the First Presidency
- May 21, 1945 – April 4, 1951
- Called by: George Albert Smith
- Successor: J. Reuben Clark
- End reason: Dissolution of First Presidency on the death of George Albert Smith

Second Counselor in the First Presidency
- October 11, 1934 – May 14, 1945
- Called by: Heber J. Grant
- Predecessor: J. Reuben Clark
- End reason: Dissolution of First Presidency on the death of Heber J. Grant

Quorum of the Twelve Apostles
- April 9, 1906 – October 11, 1934
- Called by: Joseph F. Smith
- End reason: Called as Second Counselor in the First Presidency

LDS Church Apostle
- April 9, 1906 – January 18, 1970
- Called by: Joseph F. Smith
- Reason: Resignation of Matthias F. Cowley and John W. Taylor from the Quorum of the Twelve; death of Marriner W. Merrill
- Reorganization at end of term: Boyd K. Packer ordained

Personal details
- Born: David Oman McKay; September 8, 1873; Huntsville, Utah Territory, U.S.
- Died: January 18, 1970 (aged 96); Salt Lake City, Utah, U.S.
- Resting place: Salt Lake City Cemetery; 40°46′37.92″N 111°51′28.8″W
- Alma mater: University of Utah
- Spouse(s): Emma Ray Riggs (m. 1901)
- Children: 7
- Parents: David McKay; Jennette E. Evans
- Signature

David Oman McKay (September 8, 1873 – January 18, 1970) was an American religious leader and educator who served as the ninth president of the Church of Jesus Christ of Latter-day Saints (LDS Church) from 1951 until his death in 1970. Ordained an apostle and member of the Quorum of the Twelve Apostles in 1906, McKay was an active general authority for nearly 64 years, longer than anyone else in LDS Church history. (Eldred G. Smith was a general authority for 66 years, but only served actively for 32 years, prior to being designated as emeritus.)

== Early life ==
The third child of David McKay and Jennette Eveline Evans McKay, McKay was born on his father’s farm in Huntsville, Utah Territory, about 10 miles (16 km) east of Ogden. McKay's mother was a Welsh immigrant from Merthyr Tydfil, and his father was a Scottish immigrant from Caithness. In 1880, after the death of McKay’s two older sisters, Margaret and Ellena, his father was called as a missionary to his native Scotland, where he proselytized for two years. In his father's absence, seven-year-old David had additional family responsibilities and helped his mother.

McKay's grandmother bequeathed $5,000 to McKay's mother upon her death and directed that "every cent ... be used for the education of the children." This money allowed McKay, his brother Thomas, and his younger sisters, Jeanette and Annie, to attend the University of Utah. McKay graduated in 1897 as valedictorian and class president.

Immediately afterward, he was called on a mission to Great Britain. Like his father, he presided over the Scottish district of the church. Early in his mission, he was impressed by a motto that he saw inscribed on a building in Stirling, "What E'er Thou Art, Act Well Thy Part". This message became a source of inspiration throughout his life.

== Career in education ==
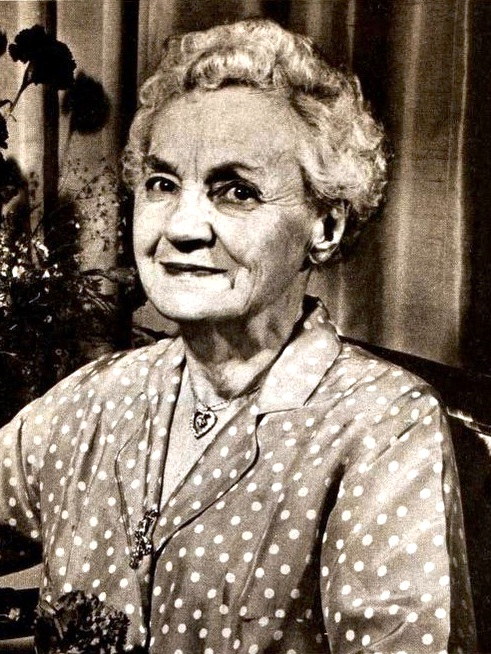
McKay's wife, Emma Ray Riggs McKay, known as "Ray"

Upon his return from Scotland in late 1899, McKay taught at the high school level at LDS Weber Stake Academy (predecessor of Weber State University). He married Emma Ray Riggs in the Salt Lake Temple on January 2, 1901. They eventually had seven children, one dying as a young child.

For his first three years at Weber, McKay taught mainly religion and literature classes. On April 17, 1902, McKay was appointed principal of Weber, succeeding the founding principal, Louis F. Moench, who had resigned after nine years in the position. One of his first actions as principal was to organize a school paper. He oversaw the inauguration of sports programs at Weber, with men's and women's basketball teams organized during McKay's tenure. In 1905, they won their baseball game against the University of Utah.

In 1905, church apostles John W. Taylor and Matthias F. Cowley resigned from the Quorum of the Twelve due to disagreement over the manifesto forbidding polygamy, and apostle Marriner W. Merrill died in early 1906. With three vacancies, George F. Richards, Orson F. Whitney, and McKay were called as apostles during the LDS Church's April 1906 general conference. McKay was then 32 years of age.

Prior to this appointment to full-time church service, McKay had planned on a career in education and educational administration. He stayed active in education even after his appointment, continuing as principal of the Weber Stake Academy until 1908 (replaced by Wilford M. McKendrick). McKay stayed at Weber Stake Academy to see the completion of new building projects that he had begun. He also served on the Weber school's board of trustees until 1922, and on the University of Utah's board of regents from 1921 to 1922.

McKay enjoyed a long, personal friendship with John F. Fitzpatrick, who published the Salt Lake Tribune from 1924 until 1960. They met weekly for breakfast to discuss the betterment of Utah. Fitzpatrick organized the Newspaper Agency Corporation, a joint operating agreement between the Salt Lake Tribune (represented as the Kearns Corporation) and the church-owned Deseret News, and consulted extensively with McKay to form this mutually beneficial business in 1952.

== Member of the Quorum of the Twelve ==
In October 1906, McKay became an assistant to the superintendent of the Deseret Sunday School Union. At the time, Joseph F. Smith was both the church president and the superintendent of the Sunday School, so many of the actual duties of the Sunday School were performed by McKay. After Smith's death in November 1918, McKay became the Sunday School superintendent.

In 1920, the First Presidency assigned McKay to make a worldwide tour of the LDS Church's missions with Hugh J. Cannon, who recorded the journey of some 61,646 miles. They opened a new mission to China, traveled to Hawaii (where McKay had a vision, promising to build a school near the temple), and visited Samoa, Tonga, New Zealand, and Palestine. In Palestine they met Wilford Booth and visited Armenian Latter-day Saints. McKay returned to Utah on Christmas Eve 1921.

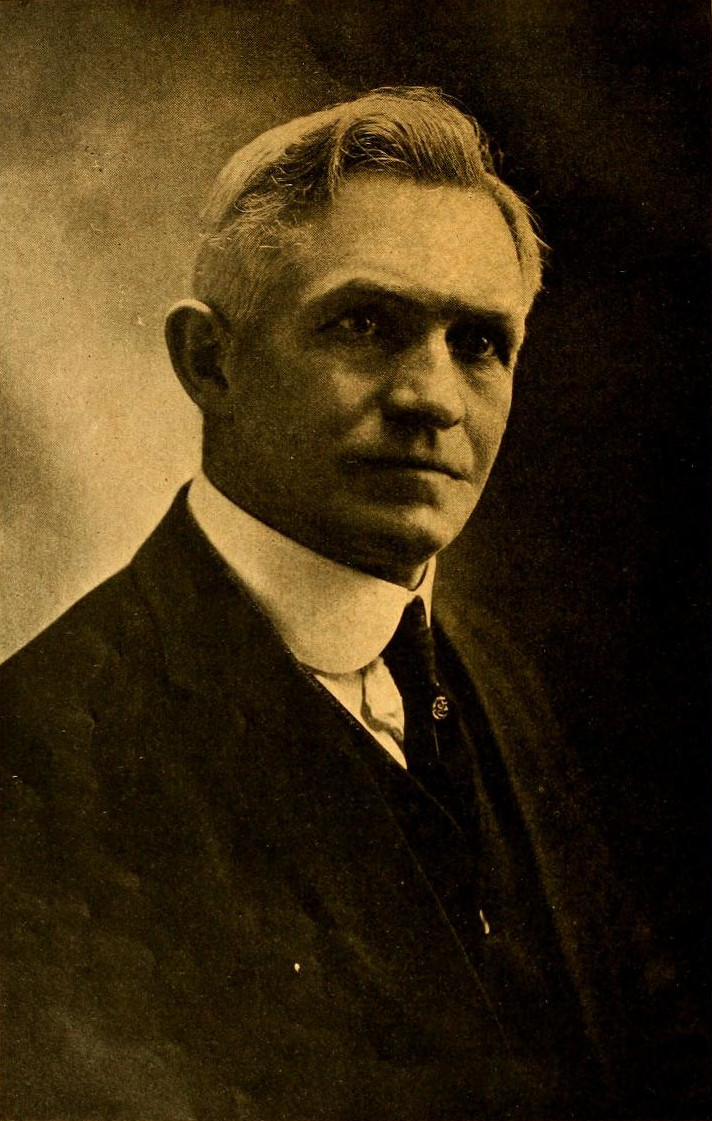
McKay in 1925, after he returned from presiding over the European Mission

From 1923 until 1925, McKay served as president of the church's European Mission, headquartered in London, with the responsibility of all LDS Church functions in the British Isles and supervision of mission presidents. In this position, McKay first used the slogan "every member a missionary" for outreach promotion. The philosophy has since been taught as a general theme throughout the church.

In 1934, McKay became second counselor to Heber J. Grant in the First Presidency. He served in that capacity until Grant's death in May 1945, and when Grant was succeeded by George Albert Smith, McKay was called to continue as second counselor.

== Influence on education ==
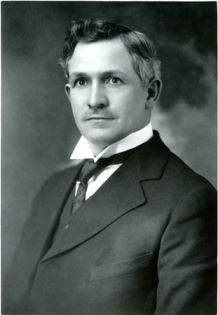
McKay as principal of Weber Stake Academy (now Weber State University), c. 1905

Within the leadership of the LDS Church, McKay focused on education. As General Superintendent of the church's Sunday School organization from 1918 to 1934, McKay built seminaries near public high schools throughout Utah, allowing students to take Latter-day Saint religious courses along with their secular high school education. McKay also transferred three LDS colleges to the state of Utah in the 1920s: Snow College, Weber State University (WSU) and Dixie College. Utah underfunded the institutions and in 1953 the governor, J. Bracken Lee, offered to give them back to the LDS Church. McKay, then president of the church, said he would accept them and the proposal was placed on the 1954 election ballot. Since it failed to pass, the three institutions remained property of the state.

McKay guided the remaining church school in Utah, Brigham Young University (BYU) into a full four-year university. McKay was the fourth Commissioner of Church Education in 1920 and 1921.

In honor of his service, the BYU School of Education was named the McKay School of Education. WSU's school of education also carries his name.

== President of the LDS Church ==
Heber J. Grant chose McKay to serve as second counselor in the First Presidency in 1934. He served in the presidency under Grant, and then under George Albert Smith, until 1951. In 1950, he also became President of the Quorum of the Twelve Apostles when his predecessor, George F. Richards died, making McKay the second most senior apostle after the church's president. He was set apart as president of the church on April 9, 1951, upon Smith's death. He was 77 years old upon assuming the presidency, and served for 19 years until his death. During this time, the number of members and stakes in the LDS Church nearly tripled, from 1.1 million to 2.8 million, and 184 to 500 respectively.

McKay was an outspoken critic of communism, opposing its perceived atheist underpinnings and denial of freedom of choice. Similarly, communist nations generally forbid proselytizing by the LDS Church and most other religions.

In 1951, McKay began plans for what eventually became BYU–Hawaii. In 1954 he made another trip around the world, visiting Brazil, South Africa, Fiji, Tonga, and other countries.

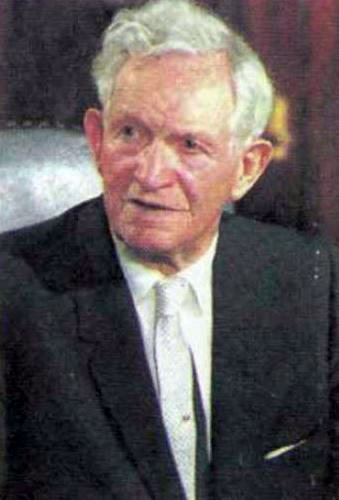
Photo of McKay featured in a 1977 edition of The Rixida, the student yearbook of Ricks College (now BYU-Idaho)

Under McKay's administration, the LDS Church's stance on Africans holding the priesthood was softened. Beginning in the mid-1950s, members of suspected African descent no longer needed to prove their lineage was not African, allowing dark-skinned members to receive the priesthood unless it was proved that they were of African descent. This policy improved proselytizing in racially mixed areas, such as South America and South Africa. Blacks of verifiable African descent (including most in the United States) were not permitted to hold the priesthood until eight years after McKay's death.

Beginning in 1961, the LDS Church spearheaded the Priesthood Correlation Program. By the 1970s, all church organizations were placed under direct priesthood leadership. These organizations became known as auxiliary organizations.

Film director Cecil B. DeMille consulted with McKay during the production of his 1956 epic film The Ten Commandments, forming a friendship lasting until DeMille's death. McKay invited DeMille to BYU, where he delivered a commencement address in 1957.

McKay regularly traveled until he was in his 90s. His deteriorating health in the mid-1960s ultimately led to the appointment of three additional counselors in the First Presidency, as existing members were increasingly infirm and often unable to preside at meetings. By 1968, the First Presidency was composed of six members, larger than it had been at the death of Brigham Young in 1877. McKay's counselors in the First Presidency were Stephen L Richards (First Counselor, 1951–59); J. Reuben Clark, Jr. (Second Counselor (1951–59, First Counselor 1959–61); Henry D. Moyle (Second Counselor 1959–61, First Counselor 1961–63); Hugh B. Brown (Third Counselor 1961, Second Counselor 1961–63, First Counselor 1963–70); N. Eldon Tanner (Second Counselor, 1963–70); Thorpe B. Isaacson (Counselor, 1965–70); Joseph Fielding Smith (Counselor, 1965–70); Alvin R. Dyer (Counselor, 1968–70).

== Death ==
McKay died on January 18, 1970, at age 96, surrounded by most of his family. The cause of death was acute congestion. Funeral services were held in the Salt Lake Tabernacle on January 22, 1970.

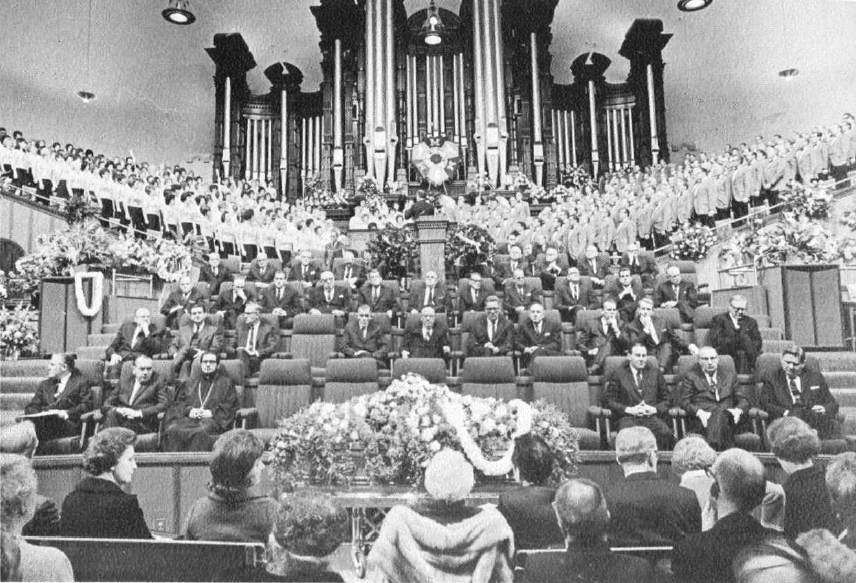
Funeral services at the Salt Lake Tabernacle

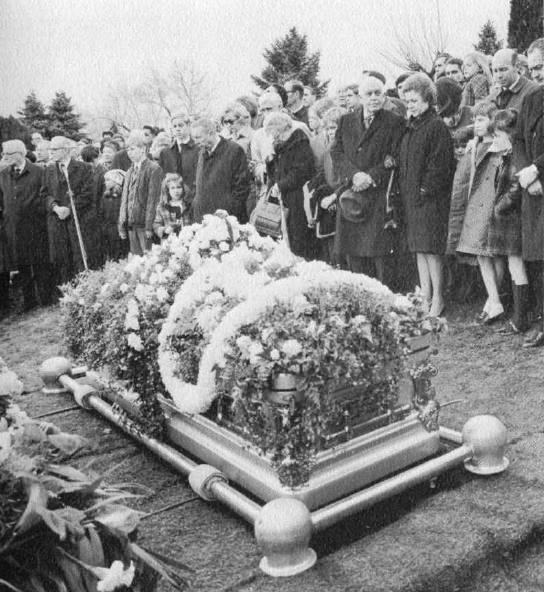
Graveside services at the Salt Lake City Cemetery

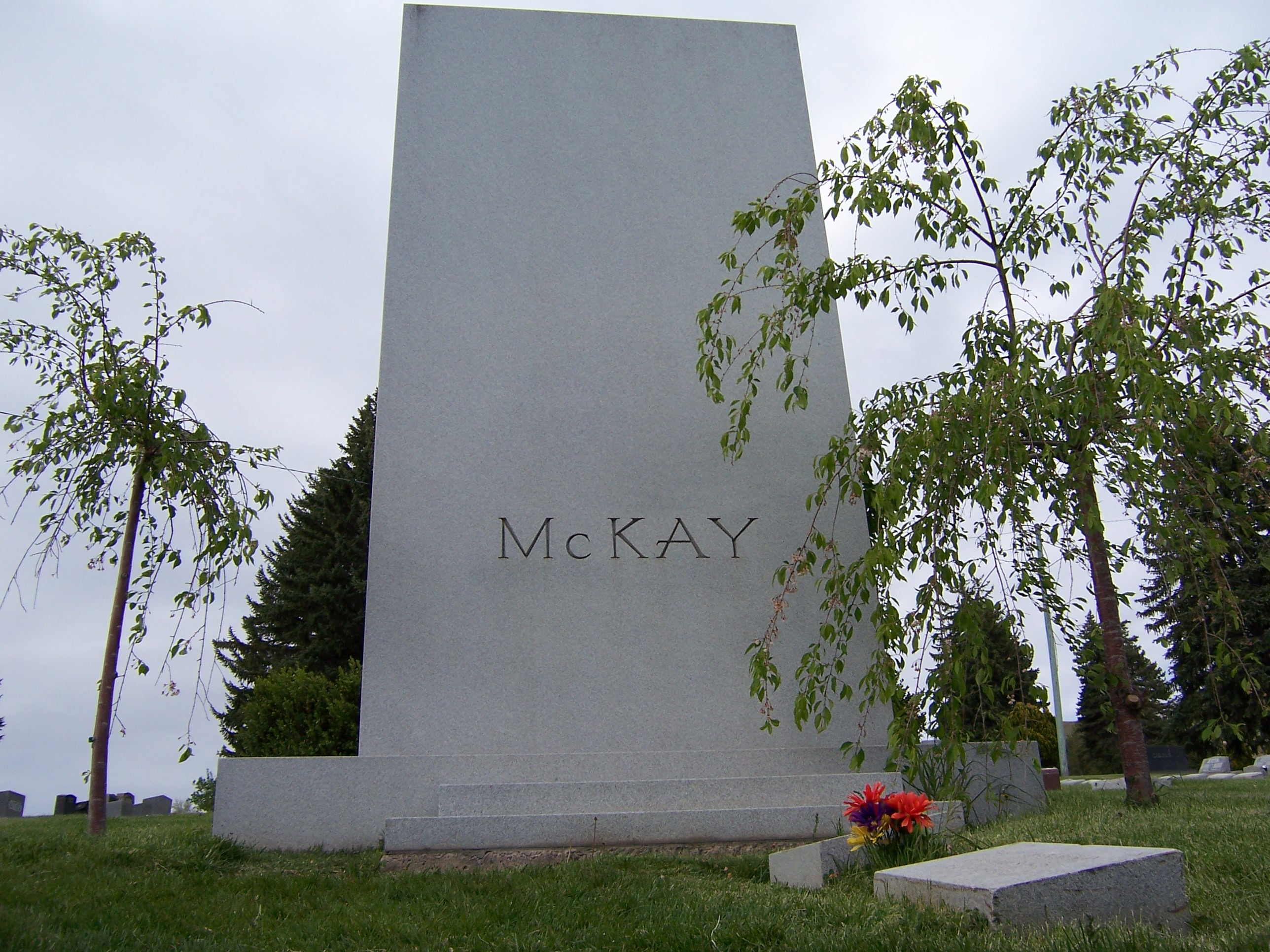
Grave marker of David O. McKay

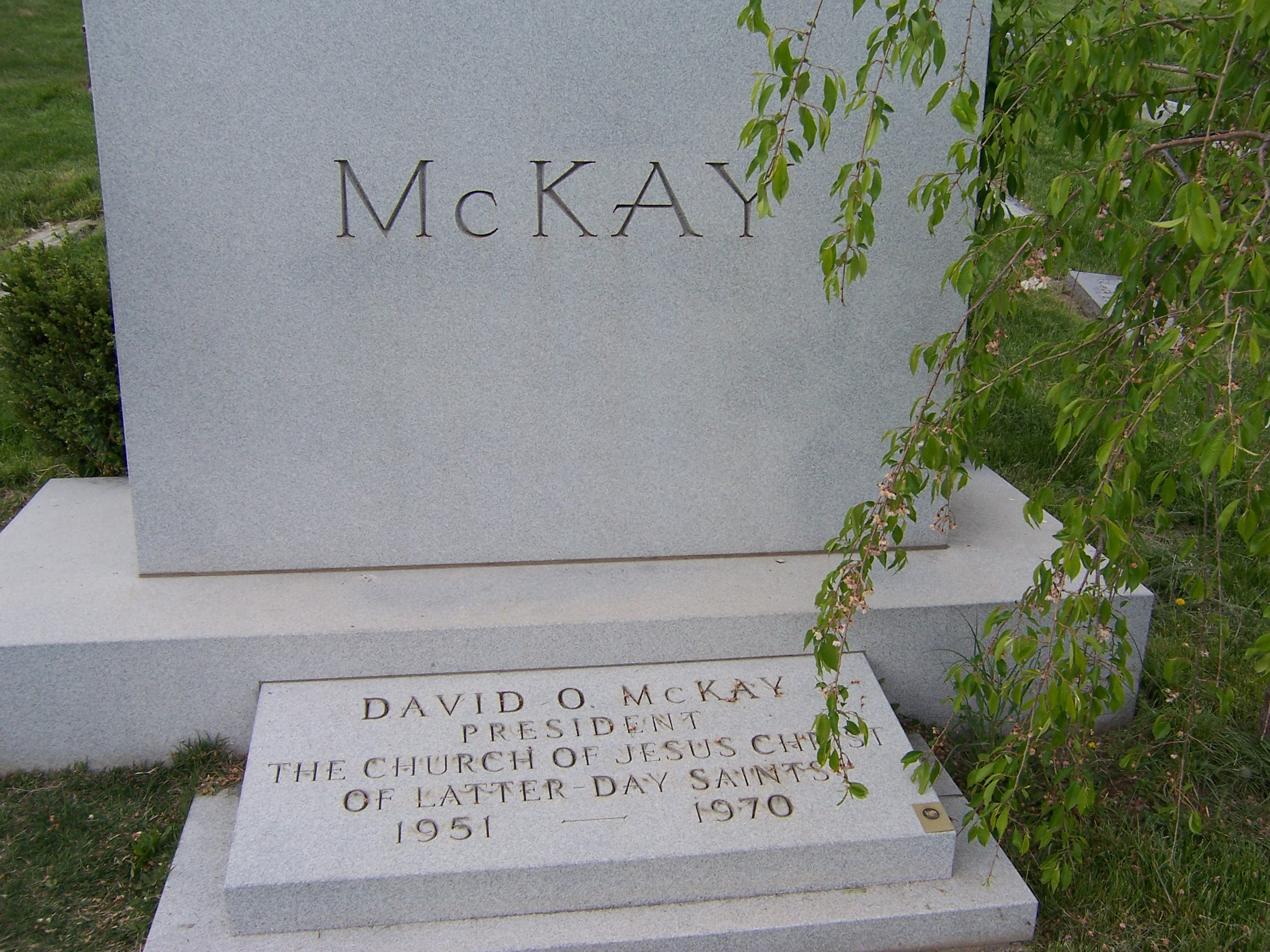
Lower portion of the monument

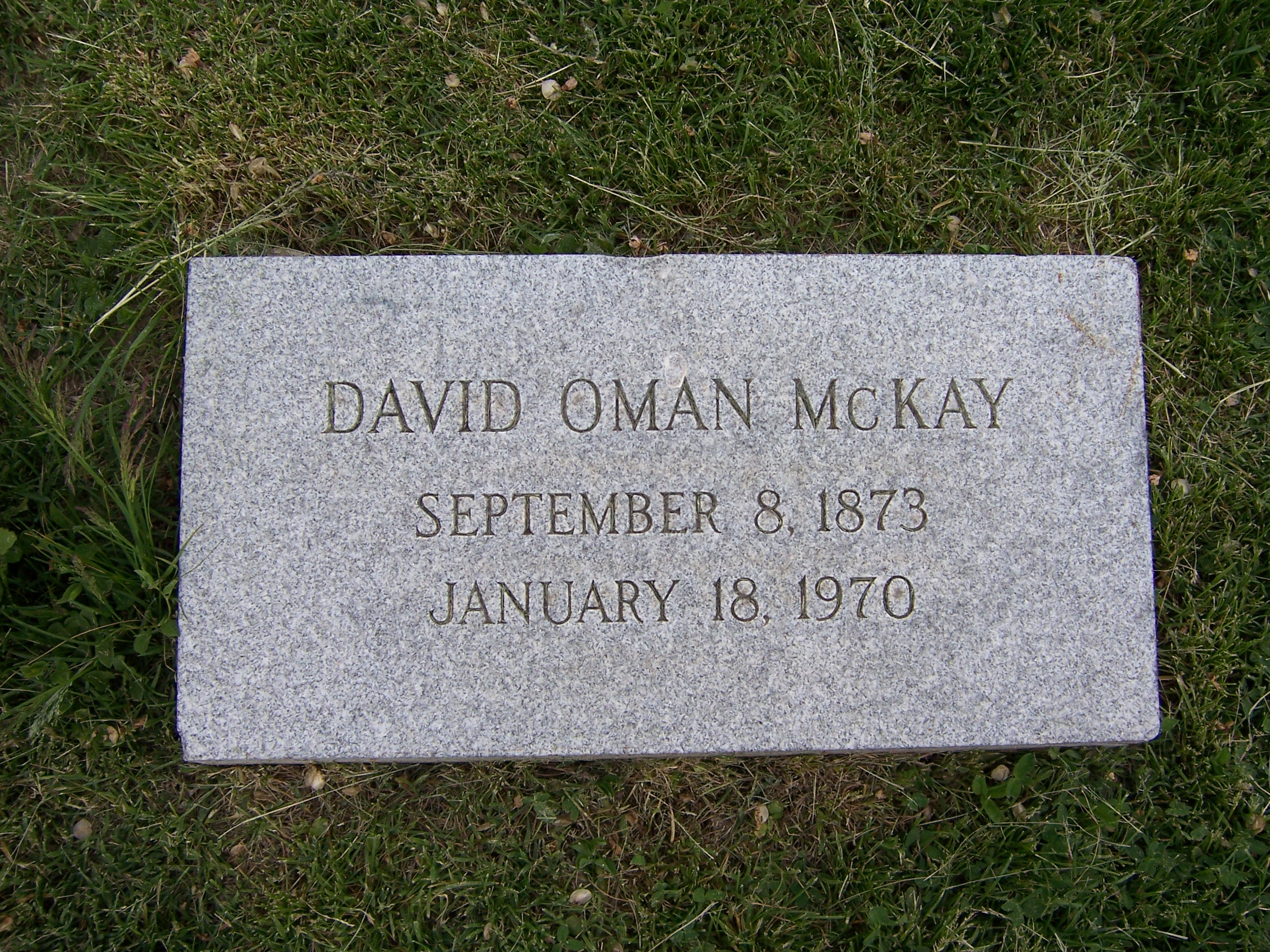
Headstone of McKay

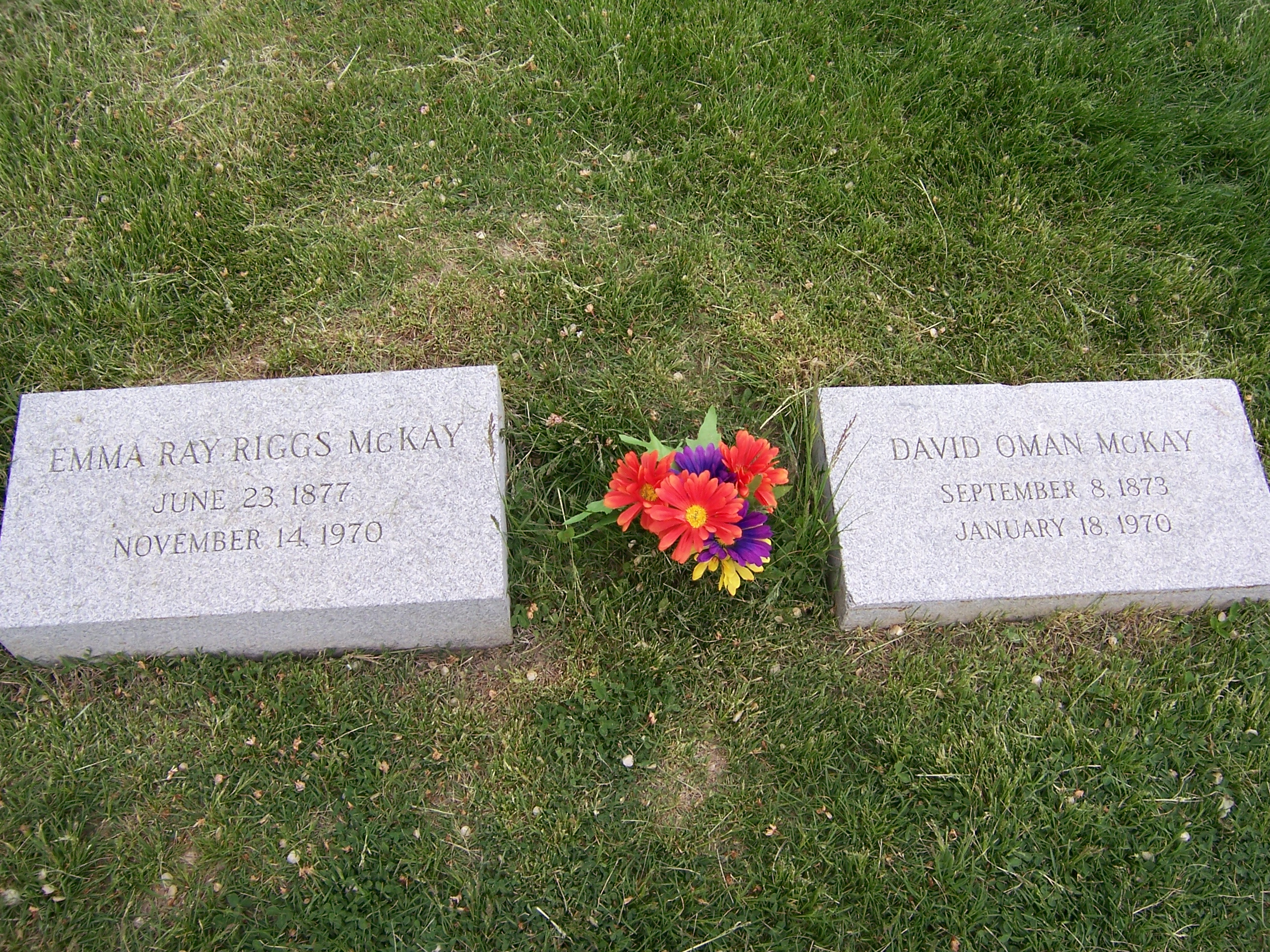
Headstones of McKay and his wife, Emma McKay

== Family ties ==
His younger brother, Thomas Evans McKay, was a prominent missionary and mission leader for the LDS Church in Switzerland and Germany; he also served as an Assistant to the Quorum of the Twelve Apostles from 1941 to 1958.

McKay's niece, Fawn McKay Brodie, was the author of the controversial book No Man Knows My History, a highly critical biography of Joseph Smith, the publication of which led to her eventual excommunication from the LDS Church.

McKay's oldest son, David Lawrence McKay, was the eighth general superintendent of the LDS Church's Sunday School organization. When his father was ill, David often read his father's sermons during general conference.

One of McKay's granddaughters is Joyce McKay Bennett, wife of former United States Senator Bob Bennett. Another grandchild, Alan Ashton, was the co-founder and co-owner of computer program WordPerfect.

The Events Center at Utah Valley University in Orem, the David O. McKay Events Center, carried McKay's name between 1996 and 2010, after an anonymous donation was given in his honor. In 2010, the name was changed (to "Utah Community Credit Center") due to a fund-raising need at the university, and McKay's name was affixed to the university's Education Center instead.

== Teachings ==
McKay was concerned with missionary work, and coined the phrase "Every member a missionary" in order to encourage church members to become more engaged in that work, and not just leave it to the full-time missionaries.

McKay's statement that "[n]o other success can compensate for failure in the home" is taught to LDS Church members as an important principle.

McKay's teachings as an apostle were the 2005 course of study in the LDS Church's Sunday Relief Society and Melchizedek priesthood classes.

== Works ==
- McKay, David O. (1953). Gospel Ideals: Selections from the Discourses of David O. McKay. selected by G. Homer Durham. Improvement Era.
- McKay, David O. (1955). Cherished Experiences from the Writings of President David O. McKay. compiled by Clare Middlemiss. Deseret Book. ISBN 9780877470304.
- McKay, David O. (1957). Pathways to Happiness. compiled by Llewelyn R. McKay. Bookcraft.
- McKay, David O. (1959). Home Memories of President David O. McKay. compiled by Llewelyn R. McKay. Deseret Book.
- McKay, David O. (1960). Secrets of a Happy Life. compiled by Llewelyn R. McKay. Prentice Hall.
- McKay, David O. (1962). Treasures of Life. compiled by Clare M. Middlemiss. Deseret Book.
- McKay, David O. (1964). Ancient Apostles. Deseret Book.
- McKay, David O. (1966). True to the Faith: From the Sermons and Discourses of David O. McKay. compiled by Llewelyn R. McKay. Bookcraft.
- McKay, David O. (1967). Man May Know for Himself: Teachings of President David O. McKay. compiled by Clare Middlemiss. Deseret Book.
- McKay, David O. (1971). Stepping Stones to an Abundant Life. compiled by Llewelyn R. McKay. Deseret Book. ISBN 9780877474425.
- McKay, David O. (1973). "My Young Friends...": President McKay Speaks to Youth. Bookcraft.
- McKay, David O. (1999). Stan Larson and Patricia Larson (ed.). What E'er Thou Art Act Well Thy Part: The Mission Diaries of David O. McKay. Blue Ribbon Books.
- McKay, David O. (2004). Teachings of Presidents of the Church: David O. McKay. The Church of Jesus Christ of Latter-day Saints. LDS Church publication number 36492.

== Notes ==
The Church of Jesus Christ of Latter-day Saints titles
Preceded by George Albert Smith	President of the Church; April 9, 1951 – January 18, 1970	Succeeded by Joseph Fielding Smith
Preceded by George F. Richards	President of the Quorum of the Twelve Apostles; August 8, 1950 – April 9, 1951	Succeeded by Joseph Fielding Smith
Preceded by J. Reuben Clark	Second Counselor in the First Presidency; May 21, 1945 – April 4, 1951; October 11, 1934 – May 14, 1945	Succeeded by J. Reuben Clark
Preceded by Orson F. Whitney	Quorum of the Twelve Apostles; April 9, 1906 – April 9, 1951	Succeeded by Anthony W. Ivins
