= Augusta Joyce Crocheron =

American writer

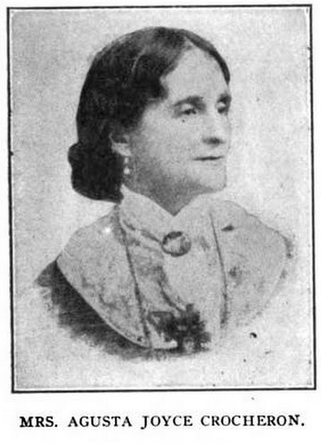

Augusta Joyce Crocheron (October 9, 1844 – March 17, 1915) was an early Latter-day Saint pioneer and writer.

== Biography ==
Born in Boston on October 9, 1844, she was two years old when her family arrived in San Francisco on the steamship Brooklyn. In 1867, her parents, John and Caroline Joyce, settled in Utah Territory, and in 1870, she became a plural wife of George W. Crocheron (1825–1910), a native of Staten Island, New York, with whom she had three sons and two daughters.

She died at her home in Salt Lake City on March 17, 1915.

== Books ==
=== Verse ===
- Wild Flowers of Deseret (1881)

=== For children ===
- The Children's Book (1890)

=== Biography ===
- Representative Women of Deseret (1884)

== See also ==
- A Believing People
