= Josephine Spencer =

American writer, journalist and political activist

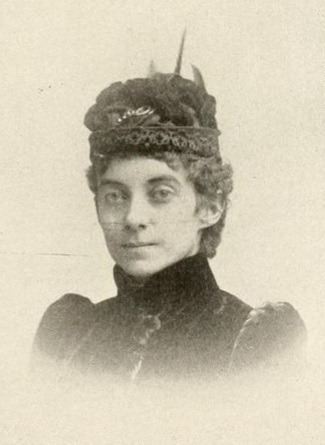
- Josephine Spencer, 1897
- Born: April 30, 1861; Salt Lake City, Utah Territory
- Died: October 28, 1928 (aged 67); Norwalk, California
- Occupation: Writer, Journalist
- Years active: 1887-1928
- Notable work: The Senator from Utah and Other Tales of the Wasatch (1895)

Josephine Spencer (April 30, 1861 - October 28, 1928) was an American writer, journalist, and political activist from Utah. She was an important figure in the Mormon home literature movement of the late 19th century who published more than one hundred poems, fifty short stories, and five serialized novels.

== Biography ==
Josephine Spencer was born in Salt Lake City, Utah, in 1861. Her father, Daniel Spencer, was the mayor of Nauvoo before the Mormon Exodus. In Utah, he was a member of the Utah Territorial Legislature and the president of the Salt Lake City stake of the Church of Jesus Christ of Latter-day Saints (LDS church). Daniel died when Josephine was seven years old, and she was raised primarily by her mother, Emily Shafter.

Spencer received a certificate in English and Literature from the University of Deseret in 1880. Shortly thereafter, she began publishing poetry and short fiction in local newspapers and literary journals. Two of her poems, "Longing" and "Poetry" were chosen for Songs and Flowers of the Wasatch, a collection of poetry edited by Emmeline B Wells and featuring Utah's best-known women writers that represented Utah in the 1893 World's Columbian Exposition in Chicago. She presented an original essay at a fundraising banquet for yellow fever victims as a member of Azalea Literary Association on 9 September 1878

In the 1890s, Spencer joined the staff of the Deseret News as a reporter. She was a founding member of the Utah Women's Press Club in late 1891, and, in May 1893, she was assigned to travel to Chicago to report on Utah's exhibition at the world exposition. She eventually became the society and literature editor for the Deseret News and one of the women in Utah to work as a full-time journalist. She continued in this role until 1921 or 1922, when she suffered a nervous breakdown and moved to Southern California, where she continued her journalistic career with the Pasadena Star. Spencer never married.

== Literary Pursuits ==
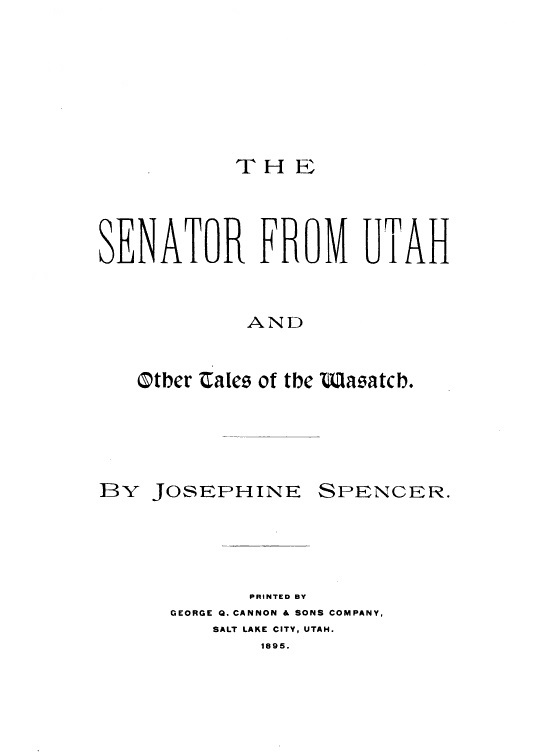
The Senator from Utah, Spencer, 1895

Like most of the figures in the Mormon home literature movement, Spencer published the bulk of her work in the periodicals established by the LDS church in the late 19th century in order to support their auxiliary organizations. These journals included the Contributor, the Juvenile Instructor, the Young Woman's Journal, and the Women's Exponent. Spencer published regularly in all of these journals, most of which included fiction and poetry in every issue.

Most of Spencer's published poetry either narrates events in Utah and Mormon history or celebrates the natural beauty of the Wasatch Mountains. The former category includes poems like "The Miracle of The Gulls" (about seagulls who supposedly saved the Mormon's first crop in the Salt Lake Valley), and "The Approach of the Army" (about the march of Johnston's Army on Salt Lake City). The latter category includes most of the poetry that she published in regional sources, but also the poems that she published in national periodicals such as the Overland Monthly, which published her poem "Autumn" in 1891 and "Night" in 1899.

Spencer's fiction covered more genres, and more potential audiences, than her poetry. Though most of her short stories were written to Mormons, very few of them were actually about Mormons. Rather, she used her fiction to demonstrate that Latter-day Saints could write in many different styles about many different things. Her first published story, "The Descendent of an Ancestor" (1891), was a "lost world" adventure tale in the style of British writer H. Ryder Haggard. She also wrote horror stories, ghost tales, heist stories, Western adventures, historical fiction, and crime fiction. Many of her early stories were political in nature, and five of these—along with two new stories—were collected in the volume The Senator from Utah and Other Tales of the Wasatch, which was published by the Deseret News Press in 1895. During the 1890s, Spencer published short fiction well beyond her native Utah and in such national periodicals as Pearson's Magazine, Munsey's Magazine, The Youth's Companion, and an early magazine of the bizarre and uncanny called The Black Cat.

After the turn of the New Century, Spencer wrote fewer stand-alone stories and concentrated instead on serialized novellas. Between 1903 and 1916, she published five such serials, all in the Young Woman's Journal.

- Love that Avails (1903, 5 Installments)
- Sheaves: A Sequel to Love that Avails (1903–04, 4 installments)
- By Natural Selection (1904, 5 installments)
- The Affairs of Betty (1911–12, 10 installments)
- "To Seek Their Fortunes"(1916, 14 installments)

In 2020, almost a hundred years after Josephine Spencer's death, By Common Consent Press published a collection of her early work titled Josephine Spencer: Her Collected Works, Volume 1, 1887–1899, edited by Ardis E. Parshall and Michael Austin.

== Political views ==
Josephine Spencer was an active member of Utah's populist party and a delegate to the 1898 populist state convention, where she was selected as the party's candidate for Salt Lake County auditor but declined the nomination. Much of her early fiction reflects populist themes, such as the importance of labor unions ("The Senator from Utah"), the need for state- and community-owned utility companies ("A Municipal Sensation," and the march of Coxey's Army ("Finley Parke's Problem").

Critic Kylie Turley argues that "The Senator from Utah" uses language more recognizable as Marxist than Mormon. "The story could be labeled Mormon Home Literature," she suggests, "because it, like many Mormon stories has obvious didactic overtones; however, its sermon is not phrased in Mormon terms. Rather, it is 'socialist realism,' or the didactic use of literature, art, and music to develop social consciousness in an evolving socialist state." In 1898, Spencer submitted a collection of previously published poetry to a progressive magazine in san Francisco called The Coming Light. A full spread of Spencer's poems was published in the December, 1898 issue, along with one new four-line poem titled simply "Revolution":

Faint and far in the night the wail of a child

Borne on heedful winds to a heedless ear;

Then, in the gray of a startled dawn, the wild,

Curdling cry of a million voices near.

In her later fiction and poetry, Spencer abandoned most of the overtly populist and socialist motifs, but she continued to write about difficult issues, including divorce, prostitution, sex trafficking, and abortion.

== Death ==
Spencer never recovered from her initial breakdown, and, in 1928, she died in Norwalk, California, where she had lived for six years. In a front-page obituary, the Deseret News memorialized her as "one of Utah's most gifted writers of poetry and prose. Many of her poems and short stories have been published at home and in the east, many of the leading publishers having given her recognition."

== Works cited ==
- Parshall, Ardis E.; Austin, Michael (2020). Josephine Spencer: Her Collected Works, Vol. One. By Common Consent Press. ISBN 9781948218658.
- Turley, Kylie Nielson (2001). "Untrumpeted and Unseen: Josephine Spencer, Mormon 'Authoress.'". Journal of Mormon History. 27 (1): 127–164.
