= Emma Ray McKay =

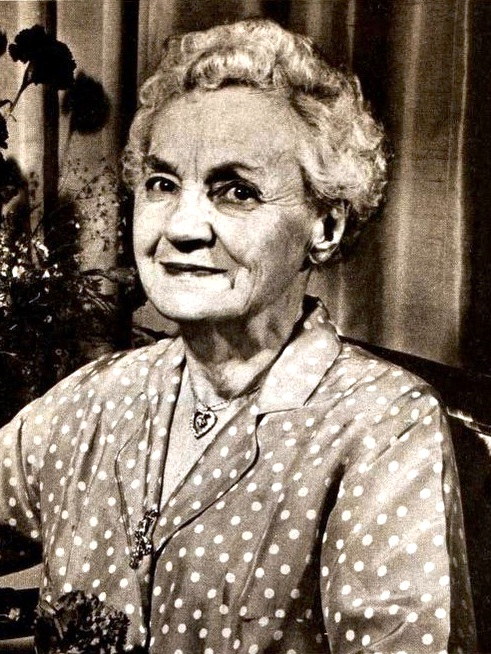
- Emma Ray McKay on June 23, 1961

Personal details
- Born: Emma Ray Riggs; June 23, 1877; Salt Lake City, Utah Territory, United States
- Died: November 14, 1970 (aged 93); Salt Lake City, Utah, United States
- Resting place: Salt Lake City Cemetery; 40.777°N 111.858°W
- Spouse(s): David O. McKay
- Children: 7
- Parents: Obadiah Higbee Riggs; Emma Louisa Robbins

Emma Ray Riggs McKay (June 23, 1877 – November 14, 1970) was a humanitarian, music patron, and the wife of David O. McKay, who served as president of the Church of Jesus Christ of Latter-day Saints (LDS Church) from 1951 to 1970, with whom she traveled the world engaged in charitable and religious work.

== Education ==
Known as "Ray" throughout her life, McKay was born Emma Ray Riggs in Salt Lake City, Utah Territory. She attended the Cincinnati Conservatory of Music to study piano performance. After returning to Utah, she was one of six students to be awarded degrees from the University of Utah in 1898 where she had attended the Department of Music. Both her parents, Emma Louise Robbins and Obadiah H. Riggs, taught at the university.

== Marriage and family ==
While teaching at Madison Elementary School in Ogden, Utah, David O. McKay proposed marriage to her. They were married on January 2, 1901, in Salt Lake City and had seven children together, one of whom died in infancy. She was set apart and served with her husband while he was president of the church's European Great Britain Mission from November 3, 1922, to December 20, 1924. She traveled with and supported her husband while he served as president of the LDS Church. On November 14, 1970, Emma McKay died.

The McKay Music Library at the University of Utah is named in her honor.

== Recognitions ==
- Utah Mother of the Year Award
- honorary doctorate in humanities from Utah Agricultural College
- Distinguished Achievement Award from Ricks College
- Outstanding Woman Award from Brigham Young University
- Eternal Quest of Womanhood Award from Utah State University

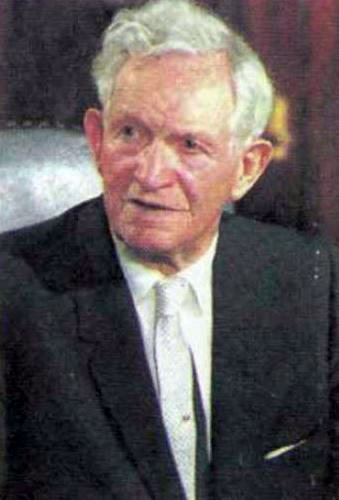
David O. McKay (Husband)

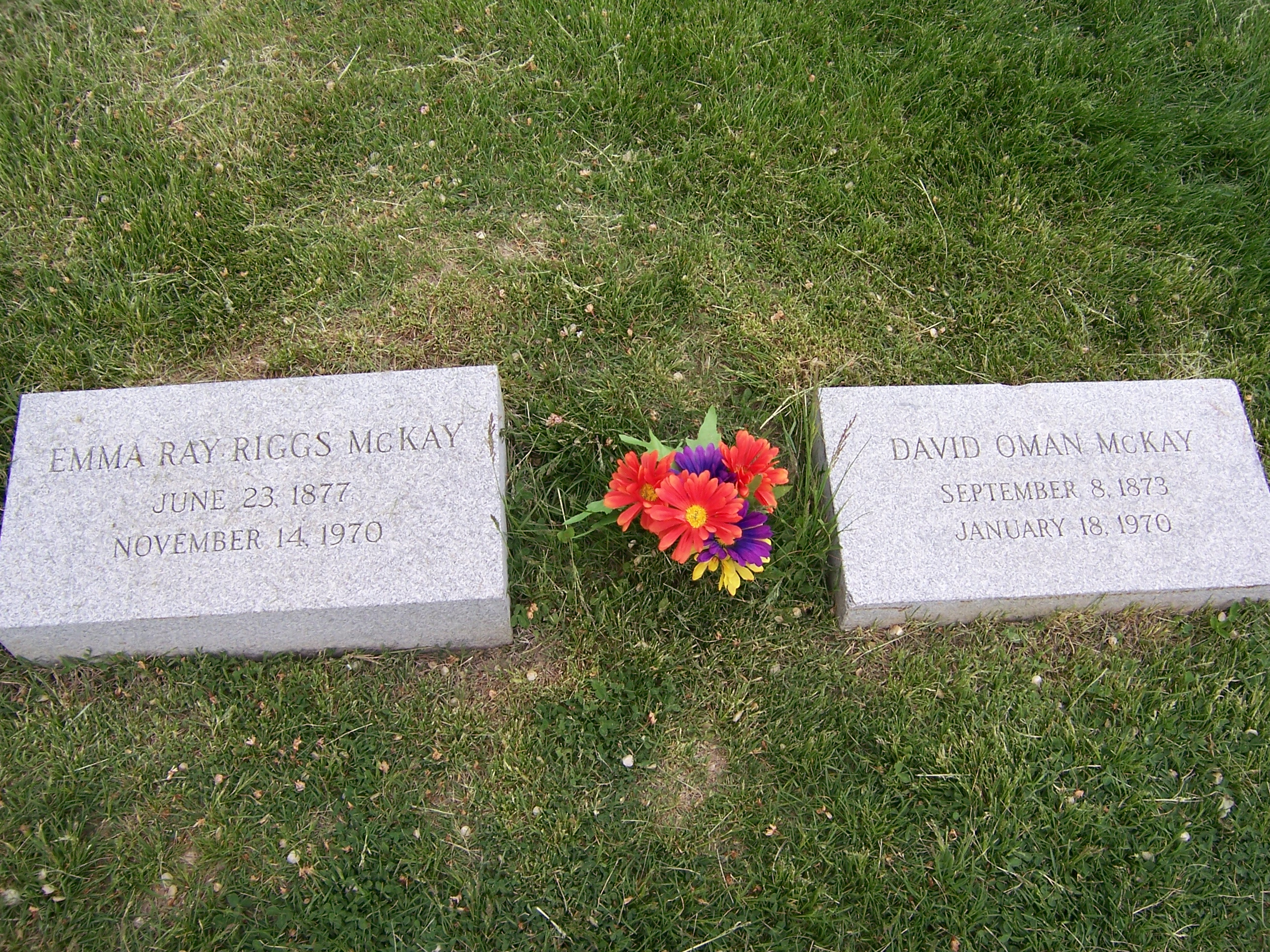
Gravestones of David O. and
Emma Ray McKay
