= Ferris Greenslet =

American journalist (1875–1959)

Ferris Lowell Greenslet (June 30, 1875 in Glens Falls, New York – November 19, 1959 in Boston) was an American editor and writer.

== Biography ==
Greenslet graduated from Wesleyan University in 1897, and earned both an M.S. and the Ph.D. by Columbia University in 1900. In 1901 he moved to Boston, where after working at the Boston Public Library and the "Boston Advertiser", he became an associate editor of the Atlantic Monthly, 1902–07. In 1910, he became a literary advisor and director of the Houghton Mifflin Co. publishing firm, continuing that employment for fifty-two years.

Ferris Greenslet wrote several biographies. He also wrote a collection of reminiscences, Under the Bridge published in 1943. He died in Cambridge, Massachusetts, on November 19, 1959

== Bibliography ==
- 1900 Joseph Glanvill – A Study in English Thought and Letters of the Seventeenth Century
- 1903 The Quest of the Holy Grail
- 1911 (1903) Walter Pater
- 1905 James Russell Lowell: His Life and Work
- 1908 Life of Thomas Bailey Aldrich
- 1943 Under the Bridge: An Autobiography. Houghton Mifflin
- 1945 (with Charles P. Curtis, Jr.). The Practical Cogitator: The Thinker's Anthology. Houghton Mifflin. 3rd Edition (1985) ISBN 0395346355
- 1946 The Lowells and Their Seven Worlds. Houghton Mifflin
