= Richard H. Cracroft =

American academic (1936–2012)

Richard Holton Cracroft (June 28, 1936 – September 20, 2012) was an author and emeritus professor of English at Brigham Young University (BYU) where he held the title of Nan Osmond Grass Professor in English and spent time as head of BYU's English department and as dean of the College of Humanities. He directed BYU's American Studies Program (1989–1994), directed the Center for the Study of Christian Values in Literature and edited the seminal A Believing People anthology, a landmark in Mormon letters. His devotion to the field is most famously summed up in his Association for Mormon Letters presidential address "Attuning the Authentic Mormon Voice: Stemming the Sophic Tide in LDS Literature" and his long-running column "Book Nook" in BYU Magazine which demonstrated the breadth of Mormon literature to a wide audience.

As a young man Cracroft served an LDS mission in the Swiss-Austrian mission. Cracroft received his bachelor's degree in English from the University of Utah in 1961; an M.A. in English in 1963. He then went on to receive his Ph.D. from the University of Wisconsin–Madison in 1970.

Along with Neal Lambert, Cracroft was the editor of an anthology of Latter-day Saint literature entitled A Believing People. He also has been the president of the Association for Mormon Letters, receiving Life-Long Membership; in 2011 he received the Petitt-Smithe Award for Outstanding Contributions to Mormon Letters. Besides writing a large number of literary essays, reviews, Cracroft wrote a short story entitled That My Soul Might See. He also wrote and edited 13 books, three of them collections of 20th-century literary biographies of Western American authors, and sponsored several conferences about literature and belief, among them, Spiritual Frontiers: Beliefs and Values in the Literary West as well as a work on Washington Irving's Western-themed writing. Cracroft has also written articles on European literary views of the American west in the 19th century. He was a founding editor of Literature and Belief.

Cracroft was a member of the Church of Jesus Christ of Latter-day Saints, in which he has served as a bishop, stake president of the Provo Utah East Stake and mission president, among other callings. He was president of the Switzerland Zurich Mission from 1986-1989.

Cracroft and his wife, the former Janice Alger, are the parents of three children.
