= Neal E. Lambert =

American academic

Neal Elwood Lambert (born 1934) is an American scholar, emeritus professor of English and American Studies at Brigham Young University (BYU). His most notable work is A Believing People: Literature of Latter-day Saints, an anthology co-edited with Richard Cracroft.

== Life ==
Neal Lambert was born in Fillmore, Utah to Elwood Delyle Lambert and his wife the former Libbie Utley.

Lambert earned a bachelor's degree and a Ph.D., the later in American Studies, both from the University of Utah. His doctoral dissertation was on the western writing of Owen Wister.

Lambert began his career as a professor at what is now Weber State University. He joined the BYU faculty in 1966.

For a time Lambert served as the chair of the BYU Faculty Advisory Council, which fulfills some of the roles faculty senates serve at other universities. He also in the early 1970s served as the faculty advisor to the BYU bookstore, working to increase the purchasing of scholarly works by the bookstore and the use of the bookstore by the faculty.

Lambert also served as the chair of BYU's American Studies Program, chair of the BYU English Department (1991-1994) and Associate Academic Vice President for graduate studies and research from 1982-1985. From 1987 until 1990 Lambert was president of the North Carolina Raleigh Mission of The Church of Jesus Christ of Latter-day Saints.

In 1991 Lambert became department chair of the BYU English Department. During his tenure BYU faced debates over the extent of dissent allowed by faculty from LDS teachings, many of white focused on members of the English Department. Lambert was succeeded as department chair by C. Jay Fox in 1995.

Lambert married the former Lucille Anne "Anne" Johnson.

Lambert is a Latter-day Saint.

== Publications ==
- "Saints, Sinners, and Scribes: A Look at the Mormons in Fiction," in Utah Historical Quarterly 36, no. 1 (Winter 1968): 63-76. This article won the 1968 Utah State Historical Society Award for best article.
- with Richard Cracroft. "Through Gentile Eyes: A Hundred Years of the Mormon in Fiction," in New Era, 2 (March 1972), 14-19.
- "The Representation of Reality in Nineteenth Century Mormon Autobiography." Dialogue 11.2 (Summer 1978): 62-74.
- with Richard Cracroft. 22 young Mormon Writers. Provo: Communications Workshop, 1975.
- with Richard Cracroft. "Literary Form and Historical Understanding: Joseph Smith's First Vision." in Journal of Mormon History 7 (1980): 33-42.
- with Matthew Durant. "From Foe to Friend. The Mormon Embrace of Fiction." in Utah Historical Quarterly 50 (Fall 1982): 325-39
- As editor. The Literature of Belief. Salt Lake City: Bookcraft and BYU Religious Studies Center, 1979.
- "And there was ... A New Writing: The Book of Mormon as a Never-ending ext" in The Association for Mormon Letters Annual 1994, 2: p. 196-200.

Lambert also was involved in editing and republishing the works of Western fiction by such authors as Edward Abbey.
