= Mormon literature =

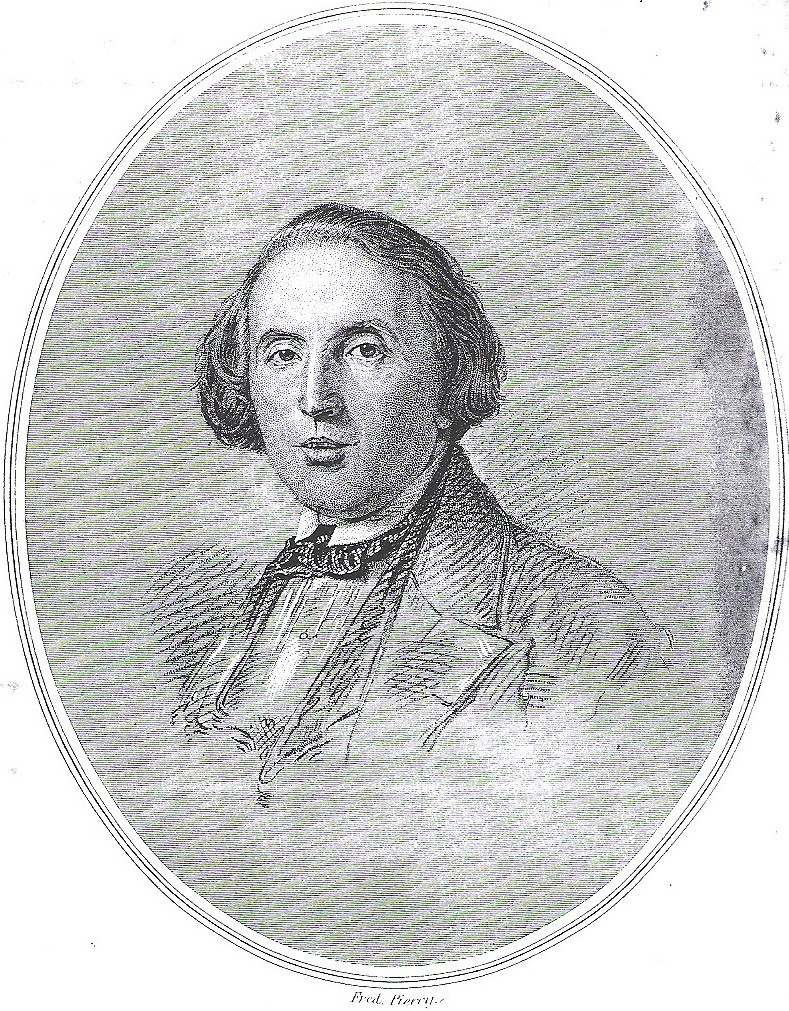
John Lyon, an early Scottish Mormon writer

Mormon literature is generally considered to have begun a few years before the March 1830 publication of the Book of Mormon. Since then, Mormon literature has grown to include more scripture, as well as histories, fiction, biographies, poetry, hymns, drama and other forms.

== See also ==
- A Believing People
- Association for Mormon Letters
  - AML Awards
- Bloggernacle
- Richard H. Cracroft
- Eugene England
- Mormon cinema
- Mormon fiction
- Mormon poetry
- List of films of The Church of Jesus Christ of Latter-day Saints
- List of pageants of The Church of Jesus Christ of Latter-day Saints
- List of Mormon Cartoonists
- Mormon art
- Mormon folk music
- Mormon music
- Whitney Awards
