= Massacre at Mountain Meadows =

Book about Mountain Meadows massacre

- Author: Ronald W. Walker; Richard E. Turley, Jr. Glen M. Leonard
- Language: English
- Subject: Mountain Meadows Massacre
- Genre: Non-fiction
- Publisher: Oxford University Press
- Publication date: August 19, 2008
- Publication place: United States
- Media type: Print (Hardcover)
- Pages: 448
- ISBN: 978-0-19-516034-5
- OCLC: 220099516

Massacre at Mountain Meadows is a book by Latter-day Saint historian Richard E. Turley, Jr. and two Brigham Young University professors of history, Ronald W. Walker and Glen M. Leonard. Leonard was also the director of the Museum of Church History and Art in Salt Lake City, Utah. The book concerns the 1857 Mountain Meadows Massacre in southern Utah, and is the latest study of the subject.

== History ==
Though the massacre had already been the topic of numerous books, the authors observed there was a modern feeling that the LDS Church should invite "true reconciliation" by showing "more candor about what its historians actually know about the event". The authors agreed, writing:

Only complete and honest evaluation of the tragedy can bring the trust necessary for lasting good will. Only then can there be catharsis.

To this end, "[LDS] Church leaders supported [the] book by providing full and open disclosure." Although he wrote in his unofficial capacity, one of the authors, Turley, had been serving as an administrator over the church's historical programs since 1986.

Beginning their work in 2001, the authors did not intend to respond to earlier treatments on the massacre, but to instead take a "fresh approach" and amass all possible primary sources. Aside from available academic and scholarly sources, they were also granted access to the LDS First Presidency's archives. There they discovered the collection of past Assistant Church Historian Andrew Jenson, including the papers from his interviews with insiders in southern Utah during 1892. This was the first modern examination of the massacre that had access to these sources.

The authors avoided portraying the perpetrators and victims as good or evil, which would overlook their human complexity and the groups' diversities. Instead, they examined the massacre as a case of American frontier violence and vigilantism.

The authors were interviewed about their research in an August 2008 airing of KUER's public forum program, Radio West. On September 17, 2008 BYU Television produced a special report entitled, Massacre at the Meadows: A BYU Broadcasting Special Report, in which they conducted a wide-ranging, hour-long interview with the authors of the book. The special report originally aired on September 24, 2008, and has been occasionally rebroadcast on BYU Television and other BYU media outlets such as KBYU-TV.

== Reception ==
Demand for the book exceeded the anticipations of its publisher, Oxford University Press. The first printing sold out before the release date, and it has since gone through several more printings. It was Oxford's top sale through Amazon.com for two months and Oxford's fastest-selling book over the last few years, selling 44,000 copies in the first two months. It received positive critical reaction and picked up by the History Book Club and the Military Book Club, though most sales were limited to Utah. Oxford considered it "a big best-seller" for its "smaller press" with conservative print runs.

== Awards and Praise ==
- Best Non-Fiction Book of 2008, Westerners International
- Best Book Award, Mormon History Association, May 2009
- Booklist Editors Choice: Adult Books for 2008, Booklist

Pulitzer Prize-winning author, Daniel Walker Howe, said the book was:

A vivid, gripping narrative of one of the most notorious mass murders in all American history, and a model for how historians should do their work. This account of a long-controversial horror is scrupulously researched, enriched with contemporary illustrations, and informed by the lessons of more recent atrocities.

In September 2009 the Journal of American History wrote:

Massacre at Mountain Meadows is arguably the most professional, transparent account of a controversial event in Mormon history produced under church auspices. The deftly and tightly written story is constructed like a Greek tragedy, the timeline contracting as the narrative expands in detail─breaking at the climax.

In June 2009 Reviews in American History wrote:

A fascinating study about one of the most controversial events of western history ... When confronted with disputed or contradictory evidence, the authors deal with it judiciously and fairly. The thoroughness of their research is most impressive ... Massacre is a significant contribution. It is carefully researched, objective in viewpoint, well organized, and clearly written.

== Sequel ==
Massacre at Mountain Meadows tells the story of the massacre, but not its aftermath, impact, media reaction, coverup, or punishment. The authors concluded "that too much information existed for a single book", and that the second half of the story would be written in a future volume. Richard E. Turley Jr. has signed a contract with Oxford University Press to publish the second volume; as of April 2010 this sequel was tentatively titled After the Massacre. The volume was released in April 2023 as Vengeance Is Mine: The Mountain Meadows Massacre and Its Aftermath.

== Related Media ==
Upon completion of Massacre at Mountain Meadows the authors expressed a desire to publish some of the materials used in their research. As a result, BYU Studies published a special edition of their journal in fall 2008. This special edition, BYU Studies Volume 47:3, contained selections from the Andrew Jenson and David H. Morris collections, along with histories, essays, and book reviews; all dealing with the Mountain Meadows massacre.

In September 2009 BYU Studies and Brigham Young University Press published the complete collections in a 352-page book, entitled Mountain Meadows Massacre: The Andrew Jenson and David H. Morris Collections.
