= Media coverage of the Mountain Meadows Massacre =

Although the Mountain Meadows massacre was covered to some extent in the media during the 1850s, its first period of intense nationwide publicity began around 1872. This was after investigators obtained the confession of Philip Klingensmith, a Mormon bishop at the time of the massacre and a private in the Utah militia. National newspapers also covered the John D. Lee trials closely from 1874 to 1876, and his execution in 1877 was widely publicized. The first detailed work using modern historical methods was published in 1950, and the massacre has been the subject of several historical works since that time.

In historical fiction, the massacre inspired a genre of frontier crime fiction in the 19th century. The massacre has been portrayed in several plays, and in a 2007 motion picture, September Dawn. The Massacre has also been of subject of several film documentaries including, Burying the Past: Legacy of the Mountain Meadows Massacre (2004) and The Mountain Meadows Massacre (2001).

== Early depictions ==
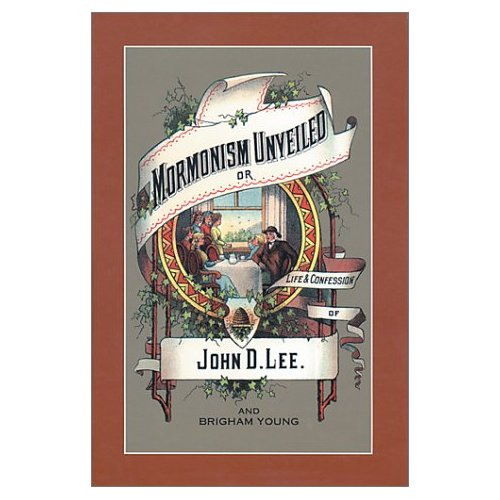
Mormonism Unveiled; or the Life and Confessions of the Late Mormon Bishop, John D. Lee, was Lee's account of the massacre, published soon after his execution in 1877.

One of the earliest depictions of the massacre was written by a massacre participant, John D. Lee, and was entitled Mormonism Unveiled; or the Life and Confessions of the Late Mormon Bishop, John D. Lee . This Confession was published in 1877, and expressed Lee's opinion that George A. Smith was sent to southern Utah by Brigham Young to direct the massacre.

In 1872, Mark Twain commented on the massacre through the lens of contemporary American public opinion in an appendix to his semi-autobiographical travel book Roughing It.

In 1910, the massacre was the subject of a short book by Josiah F. Gibbs, who also attributed responsibility for the massacre to Brigham Young and George A. Smith.

The trial of John D. Lee, which was highly publicized at the time, put an idea of an out-of-control theocracy into the public imagination. And, beginning in the late nineteenth century, the tragedy found place in a whole genre of historical treatments, novels—even two silent films. While the historical works among these critiqued (often in polemic fashion) early Utah's religious teachings and rhetoric, a caricature drawn from out of their criticisms came to find its place, in stereotype form, in popular fiction and entertainment.

== Academic treatment ==
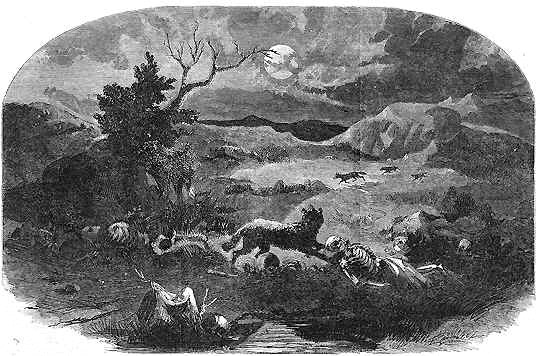
An example of the massacre's early public notoriety, this sketch of the massacre site appeared on the cover of the August 13, 1859 issue of Harper's Weekly. Inside, an article quoted Major J.H. Carleton's report describing the scene as "one too horrible and sickening for language to describe. Human skeletons, disjointed bones, ghastly skulls and the hair of women were scattered in frightful profusion over a distance of two miles."

In the 1890s, Assistant LDS Church Historian Andrew Jenson collected all the records he could find concerning the massacre. These included his own field notes, excerpts of witnesses' diaries, affidavits, newspaper reports, and the transcriptions from the LDS Church's internal investigations. Many of the interviews were with massacre participants who were granted complete confidentiality in regard to whatever they might say. In September 2009 BYU Studies and Brigham Young University Press published this complete collection in a 352-page book, entitled Mountain Meadows Massacre: The Andrew Jenson and David H. Morris Collections.

The first historical work to discuss the massacre in any depth was an 1873 work by T. B. H. Stenhouse entitled The Rocky Mountain Saints. Stenhouse had been a prominent Mormon leader for decades, and editor of the pro-Mormon Salt Lake Telegraph. Stenhouse was a liberal, however, and in the late 1860s, he joined a group of intellectual Mormons seeking liberal reform, known as the Godbeite, who were later expelled from the church for apostasy. Stenhouse's work on the massacre was drawn from newspaper reports, Klingensmith's affidavit, and some personal journalistic investigation.

The first detailed and comprehensive work using modern historical methods was The Mountain Meadows Massacre in 1950 by Juanita Brooks, a Mormon scholar who lived near the area in southern Utah. As a young school teacher, Brooks was at the deathbed of massacre participant, Nephi Johnson, and heard his last cries of "blood, blood, blood!" Brooks found no evidence of direct involvement by Brigham Young, but charged him with obstructing the investigation and for provoking the attack through his rhetoric. Until recently many considered her book the definitive work on the massacre.

Two of the most significant works after Brooks include the books Blood of the Prophets by Will Bagley in 2002 and American Massacre by Sally Denton in 2003. Bagley pointed to what he said was strong circumstantial evidence of Young's involvement through Smith, and through his early September 1857 meeting with Paiute Indian leaders Tutsegabit and Youngwids. Denton also suggested involvement by Young through Smith, but argued against involvement by Paiute leaders.

The most current work on the massacre, Massacre at Mountain Meadows (2008), was written by Latter-day Saint historian Richard E. Turley, Jr. and two Brigham Young University professors of history, Ronald W. Walker and Glen M. Leonard. Aside from available academic and scholarly sources, the authors were also granted access to the LDS First Presidency's archives. The authors decided to avoid portraying the perpetrators and victims as good or evil, which would overlook their human complexity and the groups' diversities. Instead, they examined the massacre as a case of American frontier violence and vigilantism.

Several film documentaries have focused on the massacre including, Burying the Past: Legacy of the Mountain Meadows Massacre (2004) and The Mountain Meadows Massacre (2001). The massacre, and its effects on the church's image, was also discussed in the PBS series The Mormons (2007).

== Historical fiction and portrayals ==
- The book The Star Rover (1915) by Jack London has a section of the book that describes the massacre from the viewpoint of a young boy from the Fancher Party
- The play Fire In The Bones (1978) by Thomas F. Rogers is a depiction of the massacre from the perspective of John D. Lee, and is based heavily on Juanita Brooks' research.
- The play Two-Headed (2000) by Julie Jensen depicts two middle-aged Latter-day Saint women reflecting on the massacre that occurred when they were children.
- The novel Red Water (2002) by Judith Freeman depicts John D. Lee's role in the massacre from the perspective of three of his nineteen wives.
- The film September Dawn (2007), released August 24, 2007, directed by Christopher Cain, is described by a press release as portraying the "point of view held [by] direct descendants ... that the iconic Brigham Young had complicity in the massacre, a view denied by the Mormon Church." The film uses a love story to tell the story of the massacre.
- The Netflix series Godless (2017), features a main antagonist who is a survivor of the massacre.
- The FX miniseries Under the Banner of Heaven (2022) depicts the massacre in Episode 7. It is adapted from Jon Krakauer's 2003 book of the same name, which also examines the massacre as background and context to a 1984 double murder committed by two Mormon fundamentalist brothers.

== See also ==
- Anti-Mormonism
- Portrayals of Mormons in popular media
