= Mountain Meadows Massacre and Mormon public relations =

Mormon public relations have evolved with respect to the Mountain Meadows Massacre since it occurred on September 11, 1857. After a period of official public silence concerning the massacre, and denials of any Mormon involvement, The Church of Jesus Christ of Latter-day Saints (LDS Church) took action in 1872 to excommunicate some of the participants for their role in the massacre. Since then, the LDS Church has consistently condemned the massacre, though acknowledging involvement by some local Mormon leaders.

Beginning in the late mid-to-late-20th century, the LDS Church has made efforts to reconcile with the descendants of John D. Lee, who was executed for his role in the massacre (reinstating him posthumously to full fellowship in the church), as well as with the descendants of the slain Baker–Fancher party. The church erected a monument at the massacre site in 1999 blaming John D. lee, and has opened many of its previously-confidential archival records about the massacre to scholars.

== LDS position in the 1800s ==
The first semi-official public statement by a church official concerning the massacre was by George Q. Cannon, then president of the LDS California Mission. In the October 13, 1857 edition of Cannon's San Francisco newspaper The Western Standard, Cannon responded to initial news reports of involvement by Mormons by charging the responsible journalists with writing "reckless and malignant slanders", despite knowing that the southern Utah Mormons were "as innocent of [the massacre] as the child unborn".

The church's official newspaper in Salt Lake City, The Deseret News, was initially slow to comment on the massacre, and remained largely silent until 1869, when it again denied involvement by Mormons.

In the 1870s, Brigham Young excommunicated John D. Lee and Isaac C. Haight for their roles in the massacre.

In 1877, soon after Lee was executed for the massacre, Young was interviewed by a reporter, and told him that he considered Lee's fate just. He denied personal involvement, and denied that the doctrine of blood atonement played a role in the massacre, but stated that he believed in the doctrine, "and I believe that Lee has not half atoned for his great crime."

== Statements by prominent LDS leaders about the massacre ==
=== The Mormons documentary ===
In 2007, as the 150th anniversary of the attack approached, it was featured in a PBS documentary film, The Mormons. Interviews with high-ranking LDS Church officials, who had made themselves accessible for interviews about Mormon topics, were posted online. In his interview, LDS apostle and descendant of massacre participants Jeffrey R. Holland spoke of the church's recent attempts to express regret "not for the church, not institutionally. No, try as people may, there has never been any smoking gun in Brigham Young's hand or anyone else's at that level of leadership of the church. But there was clearly local responsibility."

In a PBS broadcast soundbite, LDS apostle, Dallin H. Oaks, said, "I have no doubt...Mormons, including local leaders of our church, were prime movers in that terrible episode and participated in the killing. And what a terrible thing to contemplate, that the barbarity of the frontier, and the conditions of the Utah war and whatever provocations were perceived to have been given, would have led to such an extreme...atrocity perpetrated by members of my faith. I pray that the Lord will comfort those that are still bereaved by it, and I pray that he can find a way to forgive those who took such a terrible action against their fellow beings."

=== Expression of regret ===
On September 11, 2007, at the memorial ceremony for the sesquicentennial anniversary of the massacre, Henry B. Eyring, an Apostle who would join the First Presidency of the LDS Church the following month, read an official statement, saying:

We express profound regret for the massacre carried out in this valley 150 years ago today, and for the undue and untold suffering experienced by the victims then and by their relatives to the present time. A separate expression of regret is owed the Paiute people who have unjustly borne for too long the principal blame for what occurred during the massacre. Although the extent of their involvement is disputed, it is believed they would not have participated without the direction and stimulus provided by local church leaders and members.

Eyring was careful to place responsibility with local LDS civic and religious leaders, rather than with Brigham Young. Some, including Baker–Fancher Party descendants and historian Will Bagley, did not see this as an apology. Church spokesman Mark Tuttle agreed, saying "We don't use the word 'apology.' We used 'profound regret.'" However, Richard E. Turley, managing director of the Family and Church History Department, said it was intended as an apology and the church-owned Deseret News called this message "a long-awaited apology" from the LDS Church.

== LDS Church presence at the massacre site ==
The LDS Church, along with farmers, private landowners, and some government agencies, own the massacre site in Mountain Meadows, Utah.

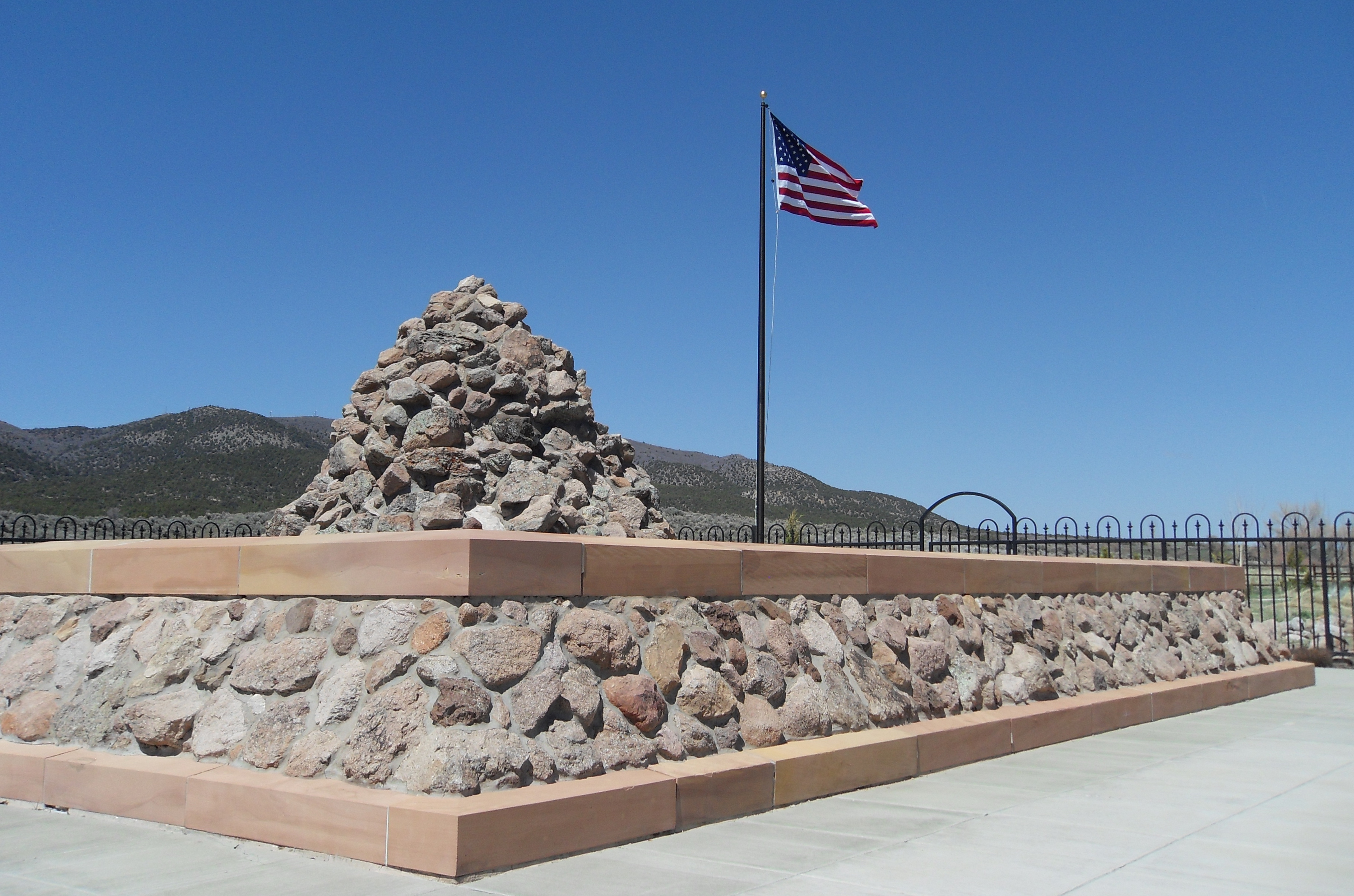
The 1999 Monument and cairn replica built by the LDS Church

The original marker at the site, a cairn, was erected over the victims' mass graves, by Major J.H. Carleton. This marker was torn down by Latter-day Saints during Brigham Young's 1861 visit to the site, then re-built in 1864 only to be torn down again around 1874. In 1932 a memorial wall and marker was built around this 1859 cairn. In 1990, the Mountain Meadows Association, with support from the LDS Church and State of Utah, built a monument overlooking the Mountain Meadows Massacre site.

In 1999 the LDS Church built and agreed to maintain a second monument at Mountain Meadows. On August 3, 1999, during excavation for this new monument, a backhoe digging footings accidentally unearthed the remains of 29 victims; this would lead to hard feelings towards the Church by some descendants. The building of this monument as well as the dedication by Church President Gordon B. Hinckley can be seen in the documentary film Burying the Past: Legacy of the Mountain Meadows Massacre.

The Mountain Meadows Monument Foundation, based in Arkansas, has attempted to buy the Church's property in the Meadows. They prefer it to be administered through an independent trustee or else for the property to be leased to the federal government for oversight as some kind of national monument. The church has declined this idea, and has purchased more property in the area to preserve it from development.

== Standing in the church of LDS massacre participants ==
Most of the main participants in the massacre remained in good standing with the LDS Church long after the massacre. In the fall of 1870, however, several of them, including Isaac C. Haight and John D. Lee, were excommunicated for their role in the massacre. After Lee's execution by firing squad, Brigham Young told a reporter that although he believed in the doctrine of blood atonement, "Lee has not half atoned for his great crime."

In the late 1950s, LDS President David O. McKay created a committee, chaired by Delbert L. Stapley to investigate the Mountain Meadows Massacre. This committee recommended that McKay restore John D. Lee's church membership, and McKay allowed one of Lee's grandsons to be baptized by proxy for him, and the church restored Lee's priesthood and full fellowship in the church. When Juanita Brooks expressed intention to publicize this church action, according to Brooks, Stapley threatened to undo the church action on behalf of Lee. However, the act was publicized in Brook's' biography of Lee, and no rescission was made, although Stapely recommended Brooks' excommunication, which McKay declined. In 2007, LDS Apostle Jeffrey R. Holland, whom Brooks taught English in high school, said that he believed Brooks was an "absolutely faithful Latter-day Saint…who had…probably helped the church come to grips with something that all of us wish had never happened."
