= Killings and aftermath of the Mountain Meadows Massacre =

Massacre in Utah, US in 1857

The Mountain Meadows massacre was a series of attacks on the Baker–Fancher emigrant wagon train, at Mountain Meadows in southern Utah. The attacks culminated on September 11, 1857, in the mass slaughter of the emigrant party by the Iron County district of the Utah Territorial Militia and some local Indians.

Initially intended to be an Indian massacre, two men with leadership roles in local military, church and government organizations, Isaac C. Haight and John D. Lee, conspired for Lee to lead militiamen disguised as Native Americans along with a contingent of Paiute tribesmen in an attack. The emigrants fought back and a siege ensued. Intending to leave no witnesses of Mormon complicity in the siege and avoid reprisals complicating the Utah War, militiamen induced the emigrants to surrender and give up their weapons. After escorting the emigrants out of their fortification, the militiamen and their tribesmen auxiliaries executed approximately 120 women, children, and men. Seventeen younger children were spared.

Investigations, temporarily interrupted by the American Civil War, resulted in nine indictments during 1874. Of the men indicted, only John D. Lee was tried in a court of law. After two trials Lee was convicted and executed near the massacre site.

== First attack and siege ==
During the early morning hours of Monday, September 7 the Baker–Fancher party was attacked by as many or more than 200 Paiutes and Mormon militiamen disguised as Native Americans.

The attackers were positioned in a small ravine south-east of the emigrant camp. As the attackers shot into the camp, the Baker–Fancher party defended itself by encircling and lowering their wagons, along with digging shallow trenches and throwing dirt both below and into the wagons. Seven emigrants were killed during the opening attack and were buried somewhere within the wagon encirclement; sixteen more were wounded. The attack continued for five days, during which the besieged families had little or no access to fresh water and their ammunition was depleted.

== Massacre ==
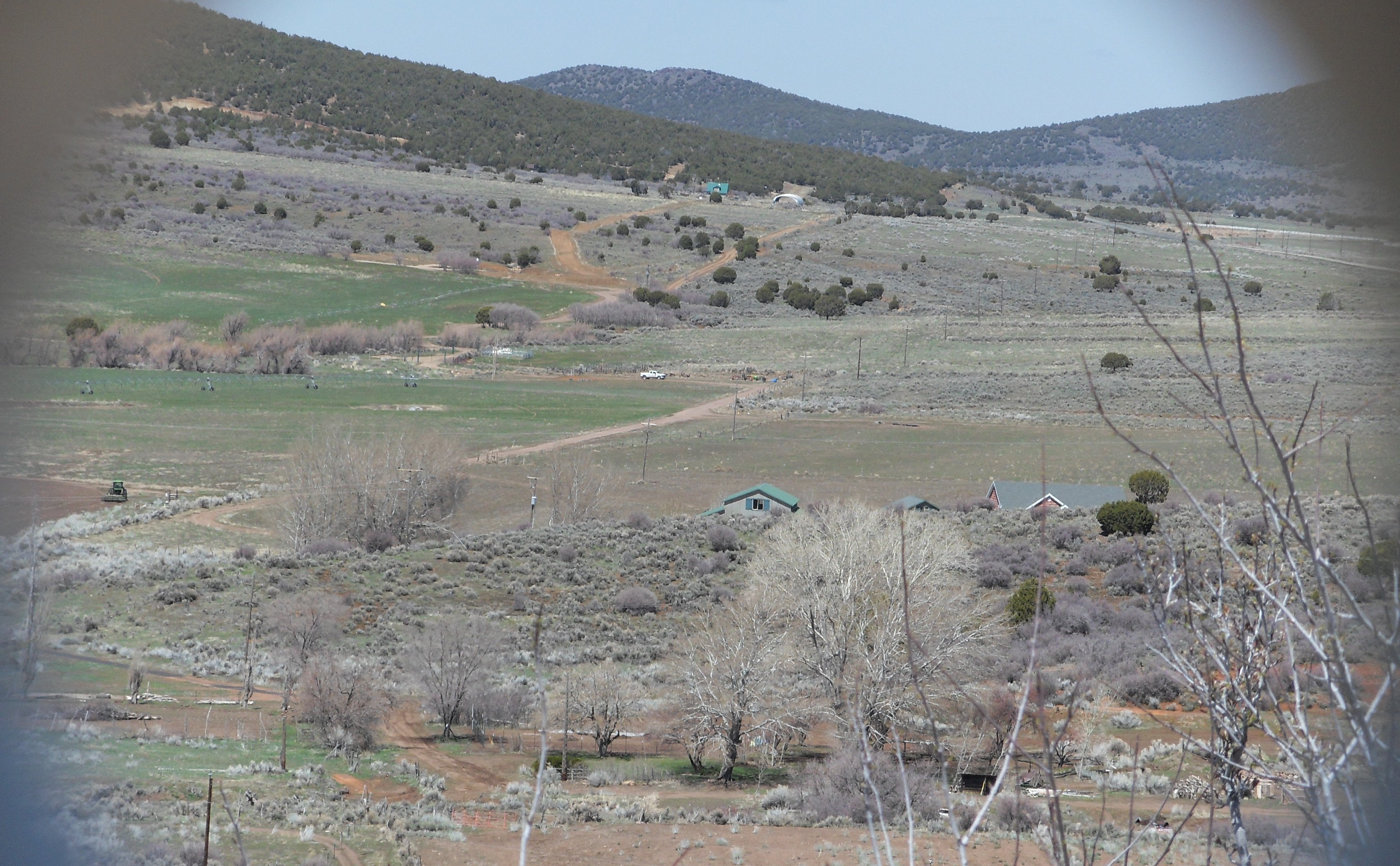
The site of the massacre, as seen through a viewfinder, from the 1990 Monument.

On Friday, September 11 two Utah militiamen approached the Baker-Fancher party wagons with a white flag and were soon followed by Indian agent and militia officer John D. Lee. Lee told the battle-weary emigrants he had negotiated a truce with the Paiutes, whereby they could be escorted safely to Cedar City under Mormon protection in exchange for leaving all their livestock and supplies to the Native Americans.

Accepting this, they were split into three groups. Seventeen of the youngest children along with a few mothers and the wounded were put into wagons, which were followed by all the women and older children walking in a second group. Bringing up the rear were the adult males, each walking with an armed Utah militiaman at his right. Making their way back northeast towards Cedar City, the three groups gradually became strung out and visually separated by shrubs and a shallow hill. After about 2 kilometers (1.2 mi), all of the men, women, older children and wounded were massacred by the Utah militia and Paiutes who had hidden nearby. A few who escaped the initial slaughter were quickly chased down and killed. Two teen-aged girls, Rachel and Ruth Dunlap, managed to clamber down the side of a steep gully and hide among a clump of oak trees for several minutes. They were spotted by a Paiute chief from Parowan, who took them to Lee. Eighteen-year-old Ruth Dunlap reportedly fell to her knees and pleaded, "Spare me, and I will love you all my life!" (Lee denied this). 50 years later, a Mormon woman who was a child at the time of the massacre recalled hearing LDS women in St. George say both girls were raped before they were killed.

All of the Mormon participants in the massacre were then sworn to secrecy. The many dozens of bodies were hastily dragged into gullies and other low lying spots, then lightly covered with surrounding material which was soon blown away by the weather, leaving the remains to be scavenged and scattered by wildlife.

=== List of victims ===
List of Mountain Meadows Massacre Victims
Name (Note: All names and ages are listed exactly as shown in Blood of the Prophets (Bagley 2002) unless otherwise noted.)		Age at time of massacre	Listed on monument		A child survivor
Last	First	Age at time of massacre	1955	1990	A child survivor
Aden,	William Allen	19	Yes	Yes	
Baker,	George W.	27	Yes	Yes	
Baker,	Manerva A. Beller	25	Yes	Yes	
Baker,	Mary Levina (Note: Spelled "Lovina" in Vengeance is Mine (2023).)	7	Yes	Yes	
Baker,	Mary Elizabeth	5	Yes	Yes	Yes
Baker,	Sarah Frances	3 (Note: Listed as 2 in Massacre at Mountain Meadows (2008).)	Yes	Yes	Yes
Baker,	William Twitty	0 (9 months)	Yes	Yes	Yes
Baker,	John Twitty (Note: The initial "T." is defined as "Twitty" in Vengeance Is Mine (2023).)	52	Yes	Yes	
Baker,	Abel	19	Yes	Yes	
Beach,	John	21	No	Yes	
Beller,	David W.	12	Yes	Yes	
Beller,	Melissa Ann	14	Yes	Yes	
Cameron,	William	51	Yes	Yes	
Cameron,	Martha	51	Yes	Yes	
Cameron,	Tillman	24	No	Yes	
Cameron,	Isom	18	No	Yes	
Cameron,	Henry	16	No	Yes	
Cameron,	James	14	No	Yes	
Cameron,	Martha	11		Yes	
Cameron,	Larkin	8	No	Yes	
Cameron,	Nancy	12	No	Yes	
Coker,	Edward (Note: This name is not included on any of the monuments, but is listed as a victim based on research from Massacre at Mountain Meadows (2008).)	27	No	No	
Coker,	Charity Porter	37	No	No	
Coker,	Unknown	7+? (Child)	No	No	
Coker,	Unknown	7+? (Child)	No	No	
Cooper,	William E.	29	No	No	
Cooper,	Abbey	29	No	No	
Deshazo,	Allen P.	20 (Note: Listed as 22 in Massacre at Mountain Meadows (2008).)	Yes	Yes	
Dunlap,	Jesse, Jr.	39	Yes	Yes	
Dunlap,	Mary Wharton	39	Yes	Yes	
Dunlap,	Ellender	18	No	Yes	
Dunlap,	Nancy M.	16	No	Yes	
Dunlap,	James D.	14	No	Yes	
Dunlap,	Lucinda	12	No	Yes	
Dunlap,	Susannah	12	No	Yes	
Dunlap,	Margerette	11	No	Yes	
Dunlap,	Mary Ann	9	No	Yes	
Dunlap,	Rebecca Jane (Note: Initial J. definied as "Jane" in Massacre at Mountain Meadows (2008).)	6	Yes	Yes	Yes
Dunlap,	Louisa	4	Yes	Yes	Yes
Dunlap,	Sarah Ann. (Note: Listed as "Sarah Elizabeth" in Massacre at Mountain Meadows (2008).)	1	Yes	Yes	Yes
Dunlap,	Lorenzo Dow	42	Yes	Yes	
Dunlap,	Nancy Wharton	39 (Note: Listed as 42 in Massacre at Mountain Meadows (2008).)	No	Yes	
Dunlap,	Thomas J.	17 (Note: Listed as 18 in Massacre at Mountain Meadows (2008).)	No	Yes	
Dunlap,	John H.	16	No	Yes	
Dunlap,	Mary Ann	13	No	Yes	
Dunlap,	Talitha Emaline	11	No	Yes	
Dunlap,	Nancy	9	No	Yes	
Dunlap,	America Jane	7	No	Yes	
Dunlap,	Prudence Angeline	5	Yes	Yes	Yes
Dunlap,	Georgia Ann	1 (18 months)	Yes	Yes	Yes
Eaton,	William M.	Unknown, adult	Yes	Yes	
Edwards,	Silas	Unknown	No	Yes	
Fancher,	Alexander	45	Yes	Yes	
Fancher,	Eliza Ingrum (Note: Spelled "Ingram" in Massacre at Mountain Meadows (2008).)	32 (Note: Listed as 33 in Massacre at Mountain Meadows (2008).)	Yes	Yes	
Fancher,	Hampton	19	Yes	Yes	
Fancher,	William	17	Yes	Yes	
Fancher,	Mary	15	Yes	Yes	
Fancher,	Thomas	14	Yes	Yes	
Fancher,	Martha	10	Yes	Yes	
Fancher,	Margaret A.	8	Yes	Yes	
Fancher,	Sarah G.	8	Yes	Yes	
Fancher,	Christopher "Kit" Carson	5	Yes	Yes	Yes
Fancher,	Triphenia D.	1 (22 months)	Yes	Yes	Yes
Fancher,	James Mathew	25	Yes	Yes	
Fancher,	Frances "Fanny" Fulfer (Note: Frances may not have accompanied her partner on the trek to California and thus survived despite being listed on the 1990 monument.)	Unknown	No	Yes	
Fancher,	Robert	19	Yes	Yes	
Gresly,	John	21	No	No	
Hamilton,	Thomas? (Note: This name is listed as "(Thomas?) Hamilton" under other names on the 1990 monument, and is not listed in Blood of the Prophets (2002).)	Unknown	Yes	Yes	
Huff,	Saladia Ann Brown	38 (Note: Age from Massacre at Mountain Meadows (2008). Age listed as unknown in Blood of the Prophets (Bagley 2002).)	Yes	Yes	
Huff,	John	14	No	Yes	
Huff,	William C. (Note: Middle initial from Massacre at Mountain Meadows (2008).)	13	No	Yes	
Huff,	Elisha (Note: According to Massacre at Mountain Meadows (2008) this name is erroneously listed and was actually a mis-identification of the surviving infant Felix Marion Tackitt at the time by government officials.)	Unknown	No	Yes	
Huff,	Mary E.	11	No	No	
Huff,	James K.	8	No	Yes	
Huff,	Nancy Saphrona [Cates]	4	Yes	Yes	Yes
Huff,	Unknown Son	Unknown	No	No	
Jones,	John Milum	32	Yes	Yes	
Jones,	Eloah Angeline Tackitt	27 (Note: Listed as 26 in Massacre at Mountain Meadows (2008).)	Yes	Yes	
Jones,	Unknown Daughter	Unknown	Yes	Yes	
Jones,	Felix Marion	1 (18 months)	Yes	Yes	Yes
Jones,	Newton	23	No	Yes	
McEntire,	Lawson A.	21 (Note: Listed as 23 in Massacre at Mountain Meadows (2008).)	Yes	Yes	
Miller,	Josiah (Joseph)	30	Yes	Yes	
Miller,	Matilda Cameron	26	Yes	Yes	
Miller,	James William	9	No	Yes	
Miller,	John Calvin	6	Yes	Yes	Yes
Miller,	Mary	4	Yes	Yes	Yes
Miller,	Joseph	1	Yes	Yes	Yes
Mitchell,	Charles R.	25	Yes	Yes	
Mitchell,	Sarah C. Baker	21	Yes	Yes	
Mitchell,	John	1? (Infant)	Yes	Yes	
Mitchell,	Joel D.	23	Yes	Yes	
Prewit,	John	20	Yes	Yes	
Prewit,	William	18	Yes	Yes	
Rush,	Milum Lafayette (Note: Initial L. definied as "Lafayette" in Massacre at Mountain Meadows (2008).)	28	Yes	Yes	
Stallcup,	Charles (Note: Reported to have left the wagon train before the siege and massacre occurred, and thus survived in Massacre at Mountain Meadows (2008).)	25	No	Yes	
Tackitt,	Cynthia	49	Yes	Yes	
Tackitt,	William H.	23	No	No	
Tackitt,	Marion	20	Yes	Yes	
Tackitt,	Sebron	18	No	Yes	
Tackitt,	Matilda	16	No	Yes	
Tackitt,	James M.	14	No	Yes	
Tackitt,	Jones M.	12	No	Yes	
Tackitt,	Pleasant	25	Yes	Yes	
Tackitt,	Armilda Miller	22	Yes	Yes	
Tackitt,	Emberson Milum	4	Yes	Yes	Yes
Tackitt,	William Henry	1 (19 months)	Yes	Yes	Yes
Wilson,	Richard	27 (Note: Age listed in Massacre at Mountain Meadows (2008).)	Yes	Yes	
Wood,	Solomon R.	20	Yes	Yes	
Wood,	William Edward (Note: Middle name listed in Massacre at Mountain Meadows (2008).)	26	Yes	Yes	

=== Lists of perpetrators ===
Although the principal aggressors and organizers in the massacre were the white, Mormon militiamen, some members of the Coal Creek and Ash Creek bands of the Southern Paiute tribe were recruited and participated.

List of Militia Perpetrators of Massacre
Name (Note: All listed names were in the Iron Military District of the Utah Territory Nauvoo Legion, and have been associated with the massacre. Names and ages are listed exactly as shown in Massacre at Mountain Meadows (2008) unless otherwise noted.)		Age at time of massacre	Strong evidence (Note: Likely militiamen perpetrators are divided into two groups in Massacre at Mountain Meadows (2008) based on the varying credibility of the evidence. A "Yes" indicates strong evidence the individual either authorized, planned, participated in, or witnessed the killings. A "No" indicates there is some evidence, but it's inconclusive. Names with little to no evidence are not included in this list.)
Last	First	Age at time of massacre	
Adair,	George Washington Jr.	20	Yes
Allen,	Ira	43	Yes
Arthur,	Benjamin A.	23	Yes
Arthur,	Christopher Jones	25	No
Bateman,	William	33	Yes
Cartwright,	Thomas Henry	42	Yes
Clark,	John Wesley	39	Yes
Clewes,	Joseph	25	No
Coleman,	Prime Thornton	25	No
Curtis,	Ezra Houghton	35	Yes
Dame,	William Horne	38	Yes
Dickson,	Robert	50	No
Durfee,	Jabez	29	No
Edwards,	William	15	Yes
Freeman,	Columbus Reed	19	Yes
Haight,	Isaac Chauncey	44	Yes
Hamblin,	Oscar	24	No
Harrison,	Richard	49	Yes
Hatch,	Ira	22	No
Hawley,	George	32	No
Hawley,	John Pierce	31	No
Hawley,	William Schroeder	27	Yes
Higbee,	John Mount	30	Yes
Hopkins,	Charles	47	Yes
Humphries,	John Samuel	31	Yes
Hunter,	George	29	Yes
Jacobs,	John	31	No
Jacobs,	Swen	33	Yes
Jewkes,	Samuel	34	No
Johnson,	Nephi	23	Yes
Klingensmith,	Philip	42	Yes
Knight,	Samuel	24	Yes
Leavitt,	Dudley	27	No
Lee,	John Doyle	45	Yes
Loveridge,	Alexander Hamilton	29	Yes
Macfarlane,	Daniel Sinclair	20	Yes
Macfarlane,	John Menzies	23	No
McMurdy,	Samuel	26	Yes
Mangum,	James Mitchell	37	No
Mangum,	John	40	Yes
Mathews,	James Nicholas	30	Yes
Morris,	Elias	32	No
Pearce,	Harrison	38	Yes
Pearce,	James	18	No
Pollock,	Samuel	33	Yes
Reeves,	Josiah	21	No
Riddle,	Isaac	27	No
Robinson,	Richard Smith	26	No
Shirts,	Don Carlos (Carl)	21	Yes
Slade,	William Rufus, Sr.	46	Yes
Slade,	William, Jr.	23	Yes
Smith,	Joseph Hodgetts	38	No
Spencer,	George	27	Yes
Stewart,	William Cameron	30	Yes
Stoddard,	David Kerr	27	No
Stratton,	Anthony Johnson	33	Yes
Tait,	William	38	Yes
Thornton,	Amos Griswold	24	No
Tullis,	David Wilson	24	Yes
Urie,	John Main	22	Yes
Western,	John	49	No
White,	Joel William	26	Yes
White,	Samuel Dennis	39	No
Wiley,	Robert	47	Yes
Willden,	Ellott	23	Yes
Williamson,	James	44	Yes
Willis,	John Henry	22	No
Young,	William	52	Yes

List of Native American Perpetrators of Massacre
Name (Note: The following is a list of names associated with the massacre. Names are listed exactly as shown in Massacre at Mountain Meadows (2008) unless otherwise noted. That source did not have any ages listed for any of the associated Native American participants, and most did not have a listed last name.)	Strong evidence (Note: Likely Native American perpetrators are divided into two groups in Massacre at Mountain Meadows (2008) based on the varying credibility of the evidence. A "Yes" indicates strong evidence the individual either participated in, or witnessed the killings. A "No" indicates there is some evidence, but it's inconclusive. Names with little to no evidence are not included in this list.)
Agarapoots	No
Bill	Yes
Buck	Yes
Comanche	Yes
Chick-eroo	No
George	No
Hamblin, Albert	Yes
Hunkup, Isaac	Yes
Jackson	Yes
Joseph (Joe)	Yes
Kahbeets	No
Kanarra	No
Knight, John	Yes
Kwi-toos	No
Lee, Lemuel (Clem)	Yes
Moquetas	Yes
Myack	No
Non-cap-in	No
Seaman, John	Yes
Tau-gu (Coal Creek John)	Yes
Toanob	Yes
Tom	Yes
Tonche	No
Toshob	No
Tunanita'a	Yes

== Surviving children ==
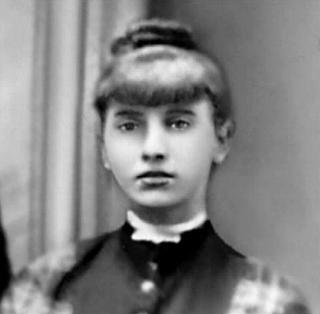
Survivor Nancy Saphrona Huff (4) was taken away along with her family's possessions by John Willis to reside at his house until she was returned to relatives in Arkansas two years later.

Approximately seventeen children were deliberately spared because of their young ages. Multiple sources claim that Lee protested and prohibited the death of all children that were assumed to be too young to talk, and directed that they be placed in the care of one who was not involved in the massacre. Not all of the young children were spared, however; the infant John Mitchell was killed and Sarah Dunlap (1) had her arm shot off, but survived. In the hours following the massacre Lee directed Philip Klingensmith and possibly two others to take the children (a few of whom were wounded) to the nearby farm of Jacob Hamblin, a local Indian agent. Later, under the direction of Jacob Forney, the non-Mormon Superintendent of Indian Affairs for Utah, the children were placed in the care of local Mormon families pending an investigation of the matter and notification of kin. However, some accounts relate that Lee sold or bartered the children to whatever Mormon families would take them. Sarah Francis Baker, who was three years old at the time of the massacre, later said: "They sold us from one family to another."

=== List of surviving children ===
List of Child Survivors of Mountain Meadows Massacre
Name		Age at time of massacre	Listed on monument	
Last	First	Age at time of massacre	1955	1990
Baker,	Mary Elizabeth	5	Yes	Yes
Baker,	Sarah Frances	2	Yes	Yes
Baker,	William Twitty	0 (9 months)	Yes	Yes
Dunlap,	Rebecca Jane (Note: Initial J. definied as "Jane" in Massacre at Mountain Meadows (2008).)	6	Yes	Yes
Dunlap,	Louisa	4	Yes	Yes
Dunlap,	Sarah Ann. (Note: Listed as "Sarah Elizabeth" in Massacre at Mountain Meadows (2008).)	1	Yes	Yes
Dunlap,	Prudence Angeline	5	Yes	Yes
Dunlap,	Georgia Ann	1 (18 months)	Yes	Yes
Fancher,	Christopher "Kit" Carson	5	Yes	Yes
Fancher,	Triphenia D.	1 (22 months)	Yes	Yes
Huff,	Nancy Saphrona [Cates]	4	Yes	Yes
Jones,	Felix Marion	1 (18 months)	Yes	Yes
Miller,	John Calvin	6	Yes	Yes
Miller,	Mary	4	Yes	Yes
Miller,	Joseph	1	Yes	Yes
Tackitt,	Emberson Milum	4	Yes	Yes
Tackitt,	William Henry	1 (19 months)	Yes	Yes

== Aftermath and the distribution of spoil ==
The Paiutes received a portion of the Baker-Fancher party's significant livestock holdings as compensation for their part in the massacre. Many of the murdered emigrants' other belongings (including blood stained and bullet-riddled clothing stripped from the victims' corpses) were brought to Cedar City and stored in the cellar of the Cedar City LDS tithing office as "property taken at the siege of Sebastopol." There are conflicting accounts as to whether these items were auctioned off or simply taken by members of the local population. Some of the surviving children subsequently claimed to have seen Mormons wearing their dead parents' clothing and jewelry.

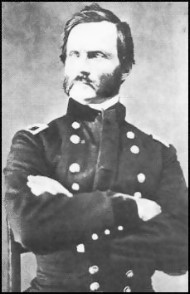
Maj. James H. Carleton, investigated the massacre site in 1859, buried the dead and erected an early marker.

In 1859, two years after the massacre, Brevet Major James Henry Carleton arrived in the area "to bury the bones of the victims of that terrible massacre". "I saw several bones of what must have been very small children. Dr. Brewer says from what he saw he thinks some infants were butchered. The mothers doubtless had these in their arms, and the same shot or blow may have deprived both of life." "Hamblin himself showed Sergeant Fritz of my party a spot on the right-hand side of the road where had partially covered up a great many of the bones."

Carleton later said it was "a sight which can never be forgotten." After gathering up the skulls and bones of those who had died, Carleton's troops buried them and erected a rock cairn inscribed with the words, Here 120 men, women, and children were massacred in cold blood early in September, 1857. They were from Arkansas, along with a cross bearing the words, Vengeance is mine. I will repay, saith the Lord.

Meanwhile, Forney and Governor Cummings directed Hamblin and Carleton to gather up the surviving children from local families and transport them to Salt Lake City, after which they were united with extended family members in Arkansas and other states.

Carleton issued a scathing report to the United States Congress, blaming local and senior church leaders for the massacre, however years later only Lee was charged with murder for his involvement. Lee's first trial ended in a mistrial but he was convicted on re-trial and executed by firing squad at Mountain Meadows.

The causes and circumstances of the Mountain Meadows Massacre remain contested and highly controversial. Although there is no evidence that Brigham Young ordered or condoned the massacre, the involvement of various church officials in both the murders and concealing evidence in their aftermath is still questioned. Moreover, while by all accounts Native American Paiutes were present, historical reports of their numbers and the details of their participation are contradictory.

== See also ==
- Investigations and prosecutions relating to the Mountain Meadows massacre
