= Burying the Past =

- Directed by: Brian Patrick
- Produced by: Brian Patrick
- Release date: 2004
- Running time: 86 minutes
- Country: United States
- Language: English

Burying the Past: Legacy of the Mountain Meadows Massacre is a 2004 documentary film about the Mountain Meadows massacre. It was directed by Brian Patrick and has won 11 awards, but the producers were unable to obtain theatrical release for the film.

== Synopsis ==
On September 11, 1857, 120 immigrants aboard a wagon train bound for California were killed by Mormons in Utah. The event is described through the testimony of Nancy Sephrona, who was 4 years old at the time, and was one of the 17 known survivors. The film chronicles the struggle of the massacre descendants from both sides who are still haunted by the tragedy.

LDS historian Glen Leonard is interviewed on camera, and makes statements as to the LDS Church's involvement in the massacre and the cover up. At the time, Leonard was working on the book Massacre at Mountain Meadows with historians Richard E. Turley, Jr. and Ronald W. Walker, which was published by Oxford University Press in 2008.

The building of the monuments at the massacre site, as well as a dedication and speech by Gordon B. Hinckley, LDS Church President, can be seen in the documentary. The film also contains footage of forensic analysis of human remains found at the site during construction of the 1999 Monument.

== Awards ==
=== Honors and awards ===
- "$5,000 Crystal Heart Award" (Heartland Film Festival)
- "Broadcast Education Association King Foundation Award Winner" (Best of Festival)
- "Broadcast Education Association Best Documentary"
- "Best of State Award Utah 2004"
- "Accolade Award of Excellence" for Documentary Feature (Accolade Competition)
- "Accolade Award of Excellence" for Voiceover (Accolade Competition)
- "Best of Festival Award" (Berkeley Film Festival)
- "Chris Award" (Columbus International Film & Video Festival)
- "Best Musical Score" (Park City Film Music Festival)
- "Best Digital Feature" (Stony Brook Film Festival, New York)
- "Spur Awards" (Western Writer's Association)

=== Official selection ===
- "Best of State Competition"
- "Broadcast Education Association"
- "Accolade Competition"
- "Berkeley Film Festival"
- "Columbus International Film & Video Festival"
- "Park City Film Music Festival"
- "Park City Film Series"
- "Denver International Film Festival"
- "Arizona International Film Festival"
- "Santa Fe Film Festival"
- "Breckenridge Film Festival"
- "Bare Bones International Film Festival"
- "Sedona International Film Festival"
- "Athens International Film Festival"
- "Bend Film Festival"
- "SpudFest"
- "Idaho International Film Festival"
- "Heartland Film Festival"
- "ARPA International Film Festival, Hollywood"
- "SMMASH Film Festival"
- "Ozark Foothills Film Festival"
