= Investigations and prosecutions relating to the Mountain Meadows Massacre =

The pursuit of the perpetrators of the Mountain Meadows massacre, which atrocity occurred September 11, 1857, had to await the conclusion of the American Civil War to begin in earnest.

== Brigham Young's involvement ==
Evidence as to whether or not Brigham Young ordered the attack on the migrant column is conflicted. Historians still debate the autonomy and precise roles of local Cedar City LDS church officials in ordering the massacre and Young's concealing of evidence in its aftermath. Young's use of inflammatory and violent language in response to the Federal expedition added to the tense atmosphere at the time of the attack. After the massacre, Young stated in public forums that God had taken vengeance on the Baker–Fancher party. It is unclear whether Young held this view because he believed this specific group posed an actual threat to colonists or were directly responsible for past crimes against Mormons. According to historian MacKinnon, "After the war, Buchanan implied that face-to-face communications with Brigham Young might have averted the Utah War, and Young argued that a north-south telegraph line in Utah could have prevented the Mountain Meadows Massacre."

== Young's belated message to Isaac C. Haight, acting commander of the Iron Brigade ==
On September 8, 1857, Capt. Stewart Van Vliet of the U.S. Army Quartermaster Corps arrived in Salt Lake City. Van Vliet's mission was to inform Young that the United States troops then approaching Utah did not intend to attack the Mormons, but intended to establish an army base near Salt Lake, and to request Young's cooperation in procuring supplies for the army. Young informed Van Vliet that he was skeptical that the army's intentions were peaceful, and that the Mormons intended to resist occupation.

On September 10, 1857, James Holt Haslam arrived in Salt Lake City, after experiencing long delays during his nearly 300 mile journey, to deliver a message from the acting commander of the Iron Brigade, Isaac C. Haight to the Mormon leader Brigham Young. The letter has yet to be found.

President Young's message of reply to Haight, dated September 10, read: "In regard to emigration trains passing through our settlements, we must not interfere with them until they are first notified to keep away. You must not meddle with them. The Indians we expect will do as they please but you should try and preserve good feelings with them. There are no other trains going south that I know of[.] [I]f those who are there will leave let them go in peace."

Yet, by the time the express rider delivered Young's letter to Haight, ordering that the emigrants not be harmed, the murders at Mountain Meadows had already taken place. According to trial testimony given later by express rider Haslam, when Haight read Young's words, he sobbed like a child and could manage only the words, "Too late, too late."

Historians debate the letter's contents. Brooks believes it shows Young "did not order the massacre, and would have prevented it if he could." Bagley argues that the letter covertly gave other instructions.

== Part played by Paiutes ==
A few days after the massacre, September 29, 1857, John D. Lee briefed Brigham Young on the massacre. According to Lee, more than one hundred and fifty "mob members" of Missouri and Illinois, with many cattle and horses, damned the Saints leaders, and poisoned not only a beef given to the Native Americans, but also a spring which killed both Saints and Native Americans. The Native Americans became enraged and after a long siege killed everyone and stripped the corpses of clothing. The Mormons spared eight to ten children. A second group, with a large cattle herd, would have suffered the same fate had not the Saints intervened and saved them. Wilford Woodruff recorded Lee's account as a "tale of blood."

In fact, seventeen children had survived. The names and ages are recorded in the Carleton report, available online. The Mormons sold the children among each other, as they did the material goods they stole from the emigrants. Carleton reported that immediately after the massacre John D. Lee, Haight, and Philip Smith [Klingonsmith] went to Salt Lake City to ask Brigham Young what should be done with the property. They offered Young the money they had taken from their victims, but he would have nothing to do with it. Brigham gave Lee instructions to divide the cattle and cows among the poor, and left it to him to distribute it as he chose. John D. Lee ended up owning a fancy carriage that had been part of the column; the wagons, rifles and other valuables ended up with the Mormons, which the Paiute pointed out was proof that they had not perpetrated the massacre. Other emigrant property was auctioned in Cedar City, in the tithing office of the church, where the Mormons termed it, facetiously, in Carleton's view, "property taken at the siege of Sebastapol."

On September 30, 1857, Mormon Indian Agent George W. Armstrong sent a letter to Young from Provo with information of the massacre. In his account, the emigrants gave the Native Americans poisoned beef. After many Native Americans died, they "appeased their savage vengeance" by killing fifty-seven men and nine women. There was no mention of survivors.

Decades later, Young's son, 13 years old in 1857, said he was in the office during that meeting and that he remembered Lee blaming the massacre on the Native Americans. Some time after Lee's meeting with Young, Jacob Hamblin said he reported to Young and George A. Smith what he said Lee had related to Hamblin on his journey to Salt Lake. Brigham Young was mistaken when he later testified, under oath, that the meeting took place "some two of three months after the massacre". When Lee attempted to relate the details of the massacre, however, Young later testified he cut Lee off, stopping him from reciting further details.

Rumors of the massacre began to reach California in early October. John Aiken, a "gentile" who traveled with the mail carrier John Hurt through the killing field, reported to the Los Angeles Star that the unburied putrefied corpses of the women and children were more generally eaten than the men.

Confirmation of the massacre was received from the Mormon J. Ward Christian. Christian claimed that the emigrants had cheated the Native Americans who sold them wheat at Corn Creek, put strychnine in water holes and poisoned a dead ox. According to Christian, the party consisted of 130 to 135. All were killed by Native Americans with the exception of fifteen infant children, that have since been purchased with much difficulty by the Mormon interpreters.

And when Brigham Young sent his report to the Commissioner of Indian Affairs in 1858, he said the massacre was the work of Native Americans.

Paiute leaders maintain that Mormon accounts of Paiute initiation of the siege are untrue. Stoffle and Evans assert that Paiutes had no history of attacking wagon trains and no Native Americans were charged, prosecuted, or punished by federal officials as a result of the Mountain Meadows massacre. Tribal oral history accounts taken in 1980s and 1990s relate stories of Paiutes witnessing the attack from a distance rather than participating. There are some stories, which relate some Paiute were present, but did not initiate or participate in the killings. A corroborating oral history of Sybil Mariah Frink tells of witnessing the planning of the massacre at her home in Harmony. She contends she followed fourteen Mormons who had disguised themselves as Native Americans to the scene of the massacre. She makes no mention of any Native Americans participating in the attack. Authors Tom and Holt summarize the state of proof regarding the massacre:

The fact that so much evidence, including relevant pages from the journals of many settlers, has been lost or destroyed, testifies to many Native Americans and their sympathizers that much of the official history cannot be considered to be complete or truthful. However, there is certainly some evidence that Native Americans with base camps on the Muddy and Santa Clara Rivers were at least involved in the initial siege of the wagon train."

While Native American Paiutes were present, certainly during the initial attack and siege, historical reports of their numbers and the details of their participation are contradictory. However, Mormon witnesses of the event are unreliable, as Carleton demonstrates, and were attempting to shift the blame onto the Native Americans.

Eyewitness accounts from Mormons that implicate the Paiutes (at first entirely so and then only in part) are set against Paiute accounts that absolve them from participation in the actual massacre. Historian Bagley believes "the problem with trying to tell the story of Mountain Meadows—the sources are all fouled up. You've either got to rely on the testimony of the murderers or of the surviving children. And so what we know about the actual massacre is—could be challenged on almost any point. _ " However, as Carleton mentions in his 1857 report, even Hamblin, the Indian agent who blamed the Paiutes for the massacre, admitted to him that in 1856 the Paiute tribe had only three guns, suggesting that it was incredible for them to have acquired sufficient guns to inflict the number of gunshot wounds evident among the victims, most of whom were killed by gunfire, not, as Mormon witnesses claimed, largely by being hit in the head with stones.

== Orchestration by militia ==
Although militia members put responsibility on the Natives, many non-Mormons began to suspect Mormon involvement and called for a federal investigation. Territorial U.S. Indian Agent Garland Hurt, in the days following the massacre, sent a translator to investigate, who returned on September 23 with the report that Paiutes attacked the emigrants and after being repulsed three time the Mormons tricked the wagon train members into surrender and killed them all. On the September 27, Hurt, the last federal Agent in Utah Territory, escaped more than seventy five Mormons dragoons for the safety of the American Army with the help of members of the Ute tribe of Native Americans.

On Lee's journey to Salt Lake City to report the massacre, he passed Jacob Hamblin going the opposite direction, and according to Hamblin, Lee admitted killing emigrants, including adolescent children, and stated that he acted under orders from officials in Cedar City. Lee later denied making these admissions or breaking his oath of secrecy.

Young first heard about the massacre from second-hand reports, After Lee reached Salt Lake City, Lee met with Young on September 29, 1857, according to Lee, he told Young about Mormon involvement. Young, however, later testified that he cut Lee off when he started to describe the massacre, because he could not bear to hear the details. Lee, however, said he told Young of involvement by Mormons. Nevertheless, according to Jacob Hamblin, Hamblin heard a detailed description of the massacre and Mormon involvement from Lee and reported it to Young and George A. Smith soon after the massacre. Hamblin said he was told to keep quiet, but that "as soon as we can get a court of justice, we will ferret this thing out".

With regard to the new policy to unbridle Natives to steal cattle, roughly at the same time of the massacre Indian agent Hurt received word that militia leadership at Ogden had arranged for the Snake tribe to run off over 400 cattle that were being driven toward California.

== Federal investigations in 1859 ==
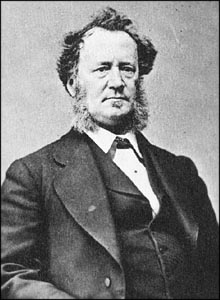
Jacob Forney
(1829–1865)

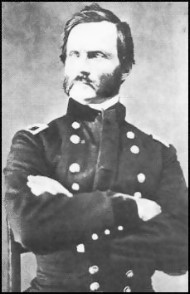
Maj. James H. Carleton, later-prominent Indian fighter of American Southwest, who investigated the massacre site in 1859 and erected an early marker

The Utah War interrupted further federal investigation and the LDS Church conducted no investigation of its own. Then in 1859, two years after the massacre, investigations were made by Hurt's superior, Jacob Forney, and also by U.S. Army Brevet Major James Henry Carleton. In Carleton's investigation, at Mountain Meadows he found women's hair tangled in sage brush and the bones of children still in their mothers' arms. Carleton later said it was "a sight which can never be forgotten." After gathering up the skulls and bones of those who had died, Carleton's troops buried them and erected a rock cairn.

Carleton's report of May 1859 included verbatim statements from Jacob Hamblin and a young Snake man, aged 17 or 18, who lived with the Hamblins and went by the name of Albert Hamblin. Both attempted to blame the local Paiute Indians, but Carleton analyzed the contradictions between the evidence he encountered and their statements to suggest that their accounts were false in several respects. Carleton tricked Albert Hamblin into revealing the identities of some of the Mormons present, by telling him that Jacob Hamblin had already informed Carleton that John D. Lee and other Mormons had been present. Albert then admitted that, apart from Lee, also present were the Mormons Prime Coleman, Amos Thornton, Richard Robinson, and "Brother" Dickinson from Pinto Creek. Speaking to Paiute Indian chiefs, Carleton was told by Chief "Jackson", head of the Santa Clara band, that a letter from Brigham Young had ordered the emigrants to be killed, and that 60 Mormons, painted and disguised as Indians, led by Bishop John D. Lee and Isaac C. Haight, had fulfilled this order. Another Paiute chief, Touche, then living on the Virgin River, told Carleton that a letter from Brigham Young to the same effect was brought down to his band by a young man named [Oliver B.] Huntington, an Indian interpreter living in Salt Lake City at the time of Carleton's report.

By August 1859, Jacob Forney, Superintendent of Indian Affairs for Utah had retrieved the children from the Mormon families housing them and gathered them in preparation of transporting them to their relatives in Arkansas. He placed the children in the care of families in Santa Clara prior to transportation. Forney and Capt. Reuben Campbell (US Army) related that Lee sold the children to Mormon families in Cedar City, Harmony, and Painter Creek. Sarah Francis Baker, who was three years old at the time of the massacre, later said, "They sold us from one family to another." As early as May 1859, Forney reported that none of the children had ever lived with the Native Americans, but had been transported by white men from the scene of the massacre to the house of Jacob Hamblin. In July 1859 he wrote of his refusal to pay claims by families who alleged they purchased the children from the Native Americans, stating he knew it was not true. Forney had seen to the gathering up the surviving children from local families after which they were united with extended family members in Arkansas and other states. Families received compensation for the children's care, including Jacob Hamblin; some protested that the amounts were insufficient—although Carleton's report criticized the conditions under which some of the children lived.

Forney concluded that the Paiutes did not act alone and the massacre would not have occurred without the white settlers, while Carleton's report to the U.S. Congress called the mass killings a "heinous crime", blaming both local and senior church leaders for the massacre.

A federal judge brought into the territory after the Utah War, Judge John Cradlebaugh, in March 1859 convened a grand jury in Provo, Utah concerning the massacre, but the jury declined any indictments.

== 1870s prosecutions of John D. Lee ==
Four of the nine Utah Territorial militiamen of the Tenth Regiment "Iron Brigade" who were indicted in 1874 for murder or conspiracy (Not shown: William H. Dame • William C. Stewart • Ellott Willden • Samuel Jukes • George Adair Jr.)
Isaac C. Haight was a Southern Utah Church Leader, and militia commander. Spent much of the remainder of his life in hiding, died 1886 in Arizona.	Maj. John H. Higbee, was said to have shouted the command to begin the killings. He claimed that he reluctantly participated in the massacre and originally came to bury the dead who he thought were victims of an "Indian attack."	Maj. John D. Lee, constable, judge, and Indian Agent. Having conspired in advance with his immediate commander, Isaac C. Haight, Lee led the initial assault, and falsely offered emigrants safe passage prior to the massacre. He was the only convicted participant.	Philip Klingensmith, a Bishop in the church and a private in the militia. He participated in the killings, and later turned state's evidence against his fellows, after leaving the church.

Further investigations, cut short by the American Civil War in 1861, again proceeded in 1871 when prosecutors obtained the affidavit of militia member Phillip Klingensmith. Klingensmith had been a bishop and blacksmith from Cedar City; by the 1870s, however, he had left the church and moved to Nevada.

During the 1870s, Lee, Dame, Philip Klingensmith and two others (Ellott Willden and George Adair Jr.) were indicted and arrested while warrants were obtained to pursue the arrests of four others (Haight, Higbee, William C. Stewart and Samuel Jukes) who had successfully gone into hiding. Klingensmith escaped prosecution by agreeing to testify. Brigham Young removed some participants including Haight and Lee from the LDS church in 1870. The U.S. posted bounties of $500 each for the capture of Haight, Higbee and Stewart while prosecutors chose not to pursue their cases against Dame, Willden and Adair.

Lee's first trial began on July 23, 1875, in Beaver, Utah before a jury of eight Mormons and four non-Mormons. The prosecution called five eye-witnesses: Philip Klingensmith, Joel White, Samuel Pollock, William Young, and James Pierce. Due to an illness, George A. Smith was not called as a witness, but provided deposition testimony denying any involvement in the massacre, as did Brigham Young, who said he could not travel because he was an invalid. The defense called Silas S. Smith, Jesse N. Smith, Elisha Hoops, and Philo T. Farnsworth, who were part of George A. Smith's party on August 25, 1857, when he camped near the Baker-Fancher party in Corn Creek. Each of them testified that they either saw, or suspected, that the Baker-Fancher party poisoned a spring and a dead ox, later eaten by Native Americans. The trial ended in a hung jury on August 5, 1875.

Lee's second trial began September 13, 1876, before an all-Mormon jury. The prosecution called Daniel Wells, Laban Morrill, Joel White, Samuel Knight, Samuel McMurdy, Nephi Johnson, and Jacob Hamblin. Lee also stipulated, against advice of counsel, that the prosecution be allowed to re-use the depositions of Young and Smith from the previous trial. Lee called no witnesses in his defense. This time, Lee was convicted.

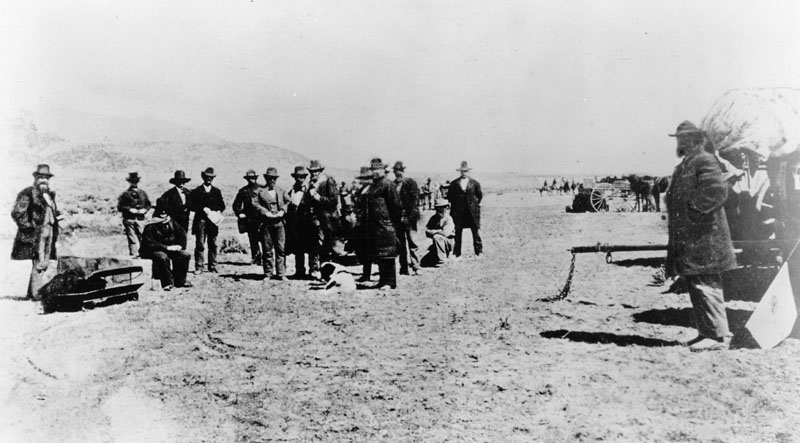
John D. Lee just prior to his execution (seated next to coffin)

At his sentencing, as required by Utah Territory statute, he was given the option of being hung, shot, or beheaded, and he chose to be shot. In 1877, before being executed by firing squad at Mountain Meadows (a fate Young believed just, but not a sufficient blood atonement, given the enormity of the crime, to get him into the celestial kingdom). Lee himself professed that he was a scapegoat for others involved.

I have always believed, since that day, that General George A. Smith was then visiting Southern Utah to prepare the people for the work of exterminating Captain Fancher's train of emigrants, and I now believe that he was sent for that purpose by the direct command of Brigham Young. The knowledge of how George A. Smith felt towards the emigrants, and his telling me that he had a long talk with Haight on the subject, made me certain that it was the wish of the 'Church authorities', that Fancher and his train should be 'wiped out', and knowing all this, I did not doubt then, and I do not doubt it now, either, that Haight was acting by full authority from the Church leaders, and that the orders he gave to me were just the orders that he had been directed to give, when he ordered me to raise the Indians and have them attack the emigrants.
