= The Mountain Meadows Massacre (film) =

2001 film by Demetrius Graham

- Directed by: Demetrius Graham
- Written by: Eric Young
- Produced by: Dave Chase, Jan Walker, Larinda Wenzel
- Narrated by: Marvin Payne
- Cinematography: Jason DeVilliers
- Edited by: Jason DeVilliers
- Distributed by: The Studio, Inc. (Hurricane, Utah)
- Release date: 2001
- Running time: 56 minutes
- Country: United States
- Language: English

The Mountain Meadows Massacre is a 2001 documentary film about the Mountain Meadows massacre. It was produced by Eric Young with Dave Chase, Jan Walker and Larinda Wenzel and distributed through The Studio, Inc.

== Synopsis ==
The documentary includes interviews with historians, reenactments, and photographs to help tell all sides of the Mountain Meadows Massacre. It relies mainly on the research of Juanita Brooks, which is found in her book The Mountain Meadows Massacre.

== See also ==
- Under the Banner of Heaven by Jon Krakauer
