= Baker–Fancher party =

Ill-fated 1857 emigrant group

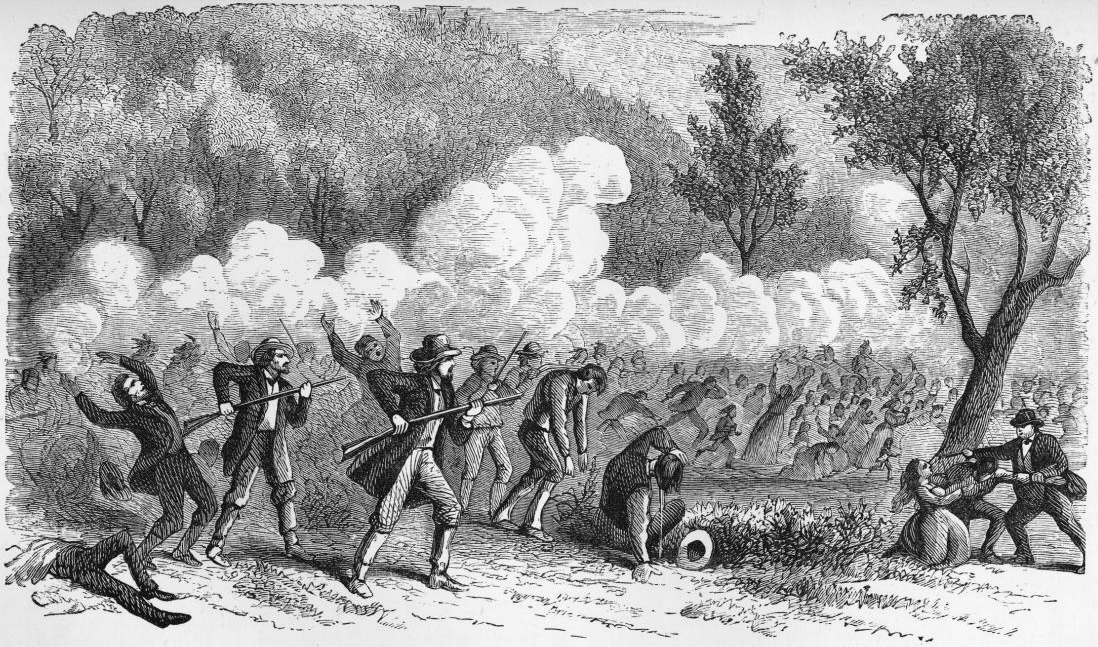
The Baker–Fancher party, a wagon train of non-Mormon settlers crossing southern Utah Territory, were attacked by the Utah Territorial Militia who perpetrated the 1857 Mountain Meadows Massacre during the Utah War.

The Baker–Fancher party (also called the Fancher–Baker party, Fancher party, or Baker's Company) was a group of American western emigrants from Marion, Crawford, Carroll, and Johnson counties in Arkansas, who departed Carroll County in April 1857 and "were attacked by the Mormons near the rim of the Great Basin, and about fifty miles from Cedar City, in Utah Territory, and that all of the emigrants, with the exception of 17 children, were then and there massacred and murdered" in the Mountain Meadows massacre. Sources estimate that between 120 and 140 men, women and children were killed on September 11, 1857, at Mountain Meadows, a rest stop on the Old Spanish Trail, in the Utah Territory. Some children of up to six years old were taken in by the Mormon families in Southern Utah, presumably because they had been judged to be too young to tell others about the massacre.

== Background ==
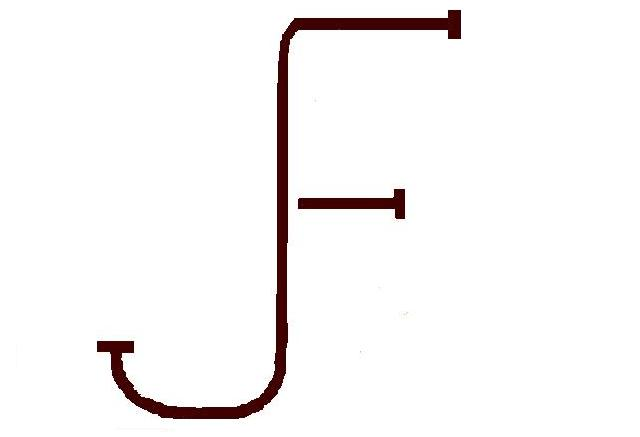
Fanchers' livestock brand, a monogrammed J-F. Registered in 1852 at Tulare County, California—intended destination of ill-fated Baker–Fancher party—to Captain Alexander Fancher's older brother John

The Baker–Fancher party consisted of several smaller parties that set out separately from the Ozarks in northwestern Arkansas, and then joined up along the way. Many of the families in the group were prosperous farmers and cattlemen with ample financial resources to make the journey west. Some of the groups had family and friends in California awaiting their arrival, as well as many relatives remaining in Arkansas. Among the groups were the Baker train, led by Captain John Twitty Baker from Carroll County, and the Fancher train, led by seasoned expeditioner Alexander Fancher, which left from Benton County. Other groups included the Huff train, which also left from Benton, the Mitchell, Dunlapp, and Prewitt trains which left from Marion County, and the Poteet–Tackitt–Jones, Cameron, and Miller trains which left from Johnson County. Pleasant Tackitt, from the Poteet–Tackitt–Jones train, was a Methodist minister who led the others in worship and prayer services while on their journey. When the groups left Arkansas in April 1857, the total company numbered more than 200. However, during the journey, some groups split off and others joined. Some of the trains that joined the company may have been from other states, such as Missouri.

The party was well outfitted with wagons, traveling carriages, a large herd of cattle estimated at close to 1,000 head, oxen, as well as numerous horses. They joined the expedition for various reasons; some to settle permanently in California, some to drive cattle west for profit, and some to find California gold. Like other emigrant groups traveling to California, they took money with them and planned to replenish their supplies in Salt Lake City for the remainder of the trip. The actual date of arrival in Salt Lake City is unknown, but historian Juanita Brooks places the arrival as August 3 or August 4, 1857 based on reports in the Journal History of the LDS Church. The Arkansans arrived in Utah with over 800 head of cattle and were low on supplies when they reached the Salt Lake area, a major resupply destination for overland emigrants.

== Emigrants associated with the Baker–Fancher Party ==
=== Families leaving before reaching Utah Territory ===
As the different wagon parties traveled across the plains, some of those left by the wayside, ended up traveling to other destinations in safety. If Missourians had ever been these trains' fellow travelers, none are known to share these Arkansans' fate. The following is a list of those known to have separated themselves before arriving in the Utah Territory:

1. Smith
2. Morton
3. Hudson
4. Basham
5. Haydon
6. Reed
7. Stevenson
8. Hamilton
9. Farmer
10. Lafoon and/or Laffoon
11. Poteet – cousins to the Tackitt family (left and went to Texas the day before the massacre)

(Various other Arkansas trains are believed to have been associated with the Fancher–Baker party while on their journeys westward, yet they did not perish with them, include the Crooked Creek, Campbell, Parker, and [John S.] Baker – as distinct from the [John Twitty] Baker – trains.)

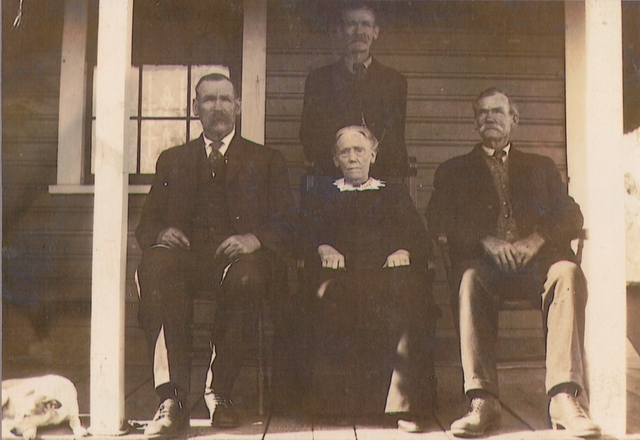
The Page family: siblings Lewis (rear), L to R – Samuel, Clarissa (Coffman), and John. Left the Baker–Fancher party before arriving at Mountain Meadows. Taken before 1918 in Clarksville, El Dorado County, California.

=== Families leaving in Utah Territory ===
The following is a list of those believed to have separated from the Fancher–Baker party, while it was passing through the Utah Territory:

1. Eaton, William M.
2. Edwards, Silas
3. Rush, Milum L., 28
4. Stallcup, Charles, 25
5. The John R. Page Family

=== Members of the wagon train who were at Mountain Meadows ===
The following table contains a list of those believed to have been killed during the massacre, along with the survivors (who are listed in bold). The table also lists if the person was listed on the 1955 Monument in Harrison, Arkansas, or on the 1990 Monument in Mountain Meadows.

List of Mountain Meadows Massacre Victims
| Name (Note: All names and ages are listed exactly as shown in Blood of the Prophets (Bagley 2002) unless otherwise noted.) | | Age at time of massacre | Listed on monument | | A child survivor |
| Last | First | Age at time of massacre | 1955 | 1990 | A child survivor |
|---|---|---|---|---|---|
| Aden, | William Allen | 19 | Yes | Yes | |
| Baker, | George W. | 27 | Yes | Yes | |
| Baker, | Manerva A. Beller | 25 | Yes | Yes | |
| Baker, | Mary Levina (Note: Spelled "Lovina" in Vengeance is Mine (2023).) | 7 | Yes | Yes | |
| Baker, | **Mary Elizabeth** | 5 | Yes | Yes | Yes |
| Baker, | **Sarah Frances** | 3 (Note: Listed as 2 in Massacre at Mountain Meadows (2008).) | Yes | Yes | Yes |
| Baker, | **William Twitty** | 0 (9 months) | Yes | Yes | Yes |
| Baker, | John Twitty (Note: The initial "T." is defined as "Twitty" in Vengeance Is Mine (2023).) | 52 | Yes | Yes | |
| Baker, | Abel | 19 | Yes | Yes | |
| Beach, | John | 21 | No | Yes | |
| Beller, | David W. | 12 | Yes | Yes | |
| Beller, | Melissa Ann | 14 | Yes | Yes | |
| Cameron, | William | 51 | Yes | Yes | |
| Cameron, | Martha | 51 | Yes | Yes | |
| Cameron, | Tillman | 24 | No | Yes | |
| Cameron, | Isom | 18 | No | Yes | |
| Cameron, | Henry | 16 | No | Yes | |
| Cameron, | James | 14 | No | Yes | |
| Cameron, | Martha | 11 | | Yes | |
| Cameron, | Larkin | 8 | No | Yes | |
| Cameron, | Nancy | 12 | No | Yes | |
| Coker, | Edward (Note: This name is not included on any of the monuments, but is listed as a victim based on research from Massacre at Mountain Meadows (2008).) | 27 | No | No | |
| Coker, | Charity Porter | 37 | No | No | |
| Coker, | Unknown | 7+? (Child) | No | No | |
| Coker, | Unknown | 7+? (Child) | No | No | |
| Cooper, | William E. | 29 | No | No | |
| Cooper, | Abbey | 29 | No | No | |
| Deshazo, | Allen P. | 20 (Note: Listed as 22 in Massacre at Mountain Meadows (2008).) | Yes | Yes | |
| Dunlap, | Jesse Jr. | 39 | Yes | Yes | |
| Dunlap, | Mary Wharton | 39 | Yes | Yes | |
| Dunlap, | Ellender | 18 | No | Yes | |
| Dunlap, | Nancy M. | 16 | No | Yes | |
| Dunlap, | James D. | 14 | No | Yes | |
| Dunlap, | Lucinda | 12 | No | Yes | |
| Dunlap, | Susannah | 12 | No | Yes | |
| Dunlap, | Margerette | 11 | No | Yes | |
| Dunlap, | Mary Ann | 9 | No | Yes | |
| Dunlap, | **Rebecca Jane** (Note: Initial J. definied as "Jane" in Massacre at Mountain Meadows (2008).) | 6 | Yes | Yes | Yes |
| Dunlap, | **Louisa** | 4 | Yes | Yes | Yes |
| Dunlap, | **Sarah Ann.** (Note: Listed as "Sarah Elizabeth" in Massacre at Mountain Meadows (2008).) | 1 | Yes | Yes | Yes |
| Dunlap, | Lorenzo Dow | 42 | Yes | Yes | |
| Dunlap, | Nancy Wharton | 39 (Note: Listed as 42 in Massacre at Mountain Meadows (2008).) | No | Yes | |
| Dunlap, | Thomas J. | 17 (Note: Listed as 18 in Massacre at Mountain Meadows (2008).) | No | Yes | |
| Dunlap, | John H. | 16 | No | Yes | |
| Dunlap, | Mary Ann | 13 | No | Yes | |
| Dunlap, | Talitha Emaline | 11 | No | Yes | |
| Dunlap, | Nancy | 9 | No | Yes | |
| Dunlap, | America Jane | 7 | No | Yes | |
| Dunlap, | **Prudence Angeline** | 5 | Yes | Yes | Yes |
| Dunlap, | **Georgia Ann** | 1 (18 months) | Yes | Yes | Yes |
| Eaton, | William M. | Unknown, adult | Yes | Yes | |
| Edwards, | Silas | Unknown | No | Yes | |
| Fancher, | Alexander | 45 | Yes | Yes | |
| Fancher, | Eliza Ingrum (Note: Spelled "Ingram" in Massacre at Mountain Meadows (2008).) | 32 (Note: Listed as 33 in Massacre at Mountain Meadows (2008).) | Yes | Yes | |
| Fancher, | Hampton | 19 | Yes | Yes | |
| Fancher, | William | 17 | Yes | Yes | |
| Fancher, | Mary | 15 | Yes | Yes | |
| Fancher, | Thomas | 14 | Yes | Yes | |
| Fancher, | Martha | 10 | Yes | Yes | |
| Fancher, | Margaret A. | 8 | Yes | Yes | |
| Fancher, | Sarah G. | 8 | Yes | Yes | |
| Fancher, | **Christopher "Kit" Carson** | 5 | Yes | Yes | Yes |
| Fancher, | **Triphenia D.** | 1 (22 months) | Yes | Yes | Yes |
| Fancher, | James Mathew | 25 | Yes | Yes | |
| Fancher, | Frances "Fanny" Fulfer (Note: Frances may not have accompanied her partner on the trek to California and thus survived despite being listed on the 1990 monument.) | Unknown | No | Yes | |
| Fancher, | Robert | 19 | Yes | Yes | |
| Gresly, | John | 21 | No | No | |
| Hamilton, | Thomas? (Note: This name is listed as "(Thomas?) Hamilton" under other names on the 1990 monument, and is not listed in Blood of the Prophets (2002).) | Unknown | Yes | Yes | |
| Huff, | Saladia Ann Brown | 38 (Note: Age from Massacre at Mountain Meadows (2008). Age listed as unknown in Blood of the Prophets (Bagley 2002).) | Yes | Yes | |
| Huff, | John | 14 | No | Yes | |
| Huff, | William C. (Note: Middle initial from Massacre at Mountain Meadows (2008).) | 13 | No | Yes | |
| Huff, | Elisha (Note: According to Massacre at Mountain Meadows (2008) this name is erroneously listed and was actually a mis-identification of the surviving infant Felix Marion Tackitt at the time by government officials.) | Unknown | No | Yes | |
| Huff, | Mary E. | 11 | No | No | |
| Huff, | James K. | 8 | No | Yes | |
| Huff, | **Nancy Saphrona [Cates]** | 4 | Yes | Yes | Yes |
| Huff, | Unknown Son | Unknown | No | No | |
| Jones, | John Milum | 32 | Yes | Yes | |
| Jones, | Eloah Angeline Tackitt | 27 (Note: Listed as 26 in Massacre at Mountain Meadows (2008).) | Yes | Yes | |
| Jones, | Unknown Daughter | Unknown | Yes | Yes | |
| Jones, | **Felix Marion** | 1 (18 months) | Yes | Yes | Yes |
| Jones, | Newton | 23 | No | Yes | |
| McEntire, | Lawson A. | 21 (Note: Listed as 23 in Massacre at Mountain Meadows (2008).) | Yes | Yes | |
| Miller, | Josiah (Joseph) | 30 | Yes | Yes | |
| Miller, | Matilda Cameron | 26 | Yes | Yes | |
| Miller, | James William | 9 | No | Yes | |
| Miller, | **John Calvin** | 6 | Yes | Yes | Yes |
| Miller, | **Mary** | 4 | Yes | Yes | Yes |
| Miller, | **Joseph** | 1 | Yes | Yes | Yes |
| Mitchell, | Charles R. | 25 | Yes | Yes | |
| Mitchell, | Sarah C. Baker | 21 | Yes | Yes | |
| Mitchell, | John | 1? (Infant) | Yes | Yes | |
| Mitchell, | Joel D. | 23 | Yes | Yes | |
| Prewit, | John | 20 | Yes | Yes | |
| Prewit, | William | 18 | Yes | Yes | |
| Rush, | Milum Lafayette (Note: Initial L. definied as "Lafayette" in Massacre at Mountain Meadows (2008).) | 28 | Yes | Yes | |
| Stallcup, | Charles (Note: Reported to have left the wagon train before the siege and massacre occurred, and thus survived in Massacre at Mountain Meadows (2008).) | 25 | No | Yes | |
| Tackitt, | Cynthia | 49 | Yes | Yes | |
| Tackitt, | William H. | 23 | No | No | |
| Tackitt, | Marion | 20 | Yes | Yes | |
| Tackitt, | Sebron | 18 | No | Yes | |
| Tackitt, | Matilda | 16 | No | Yes | |
| Tackitt, | James M. | 14 | No | Yes | |
| Tackitt, | Jones M. | 12 | No | Yes | |
| Tackitt, | Pleasant | 25 | Yes | Yes | |
| Tackitt, | Armilda Miller | 22 | Yes | Yes | |
| Tackitt, | **Emberson Milum** | 4 | Yes | Yes | Yes |
| Tackitt, | **William Henry** | 1 (19 months) | Yes | Yes | Yes |
| Wilson, | Richard | 27 (Note: Age listed in Massacre at Mountain Meadows (2008).) | Yes | Yes | |
| Wood, | Solomon R. | 20 | Yes | Yes | |
| Wood, | William Edward (Note: Middle name listed in Massacre at Mountain Meadows (2008).) | 26 | Yes | Yes | |

== Siege and massacre ==
During the early morning hours of Monday, September 7, the Baker–Fancher party was attacked, at their Mountain Meadows camp, by as many or more than 200 fighters – Mormon militiamen disguised as Native Americans, and according to some accounts including Paiutes, but this was refuted by some of the survivors.

The attackers were positioned in a small ravine southeast of the emigrant camp. As the attackers shot into the camp, the Baker–Fancher party defended itself by encircling and lowering their wagons, along with digging shallow trenches and throwing dirt both below and into the wagons. Seven emigrants were killed during this opening attack and were buried somewhere within the wagon encirclement; sixteen more were wounded. The attack continued for five days, during which the besieged families had little or no access to fresh water and their ammunition was depleted.

On Friday, September 11, 1857, two Mormon militiamen approached the Baker–Fancher party wagons with a white flag and were soon followed by Indian agent and militia officer John D. Lee. Lee told the battle-weary emigrants that he had negotiated a truce with the Paiutes, whereby they could be escorted safely the 36 miles back to Cedar City under Mormon protection in exchange for turning all of their livestock and supplies over to the Native Americans. Accepting this, the emigrants were led out of their fortification. When a signal was given, the Mormon militiamen turned and murdered the male members of the Baker–Fancher party standing by their side. According to Mormon sources, the militia let a group of Paiute Indians execute the women and children. Some children were killed while in their mothers' arms or after being crushed by the butts of rifles or boot heels. The bodies of the dead were gathered and looted for valuables, and were then left in shallow graves or on the open ground. Members of the Mormon militia were sworn to secrecy. A plan was set to blame the massacre on the Indians. The militia did not kill 17 small children who were deemed too young to relate the story. These children were taken in by local Mormon families. The children were later reclaimed by the U.S. Army and returned to relatives, and there is legend that one girl was not returned and lived out her life among the Mormons.

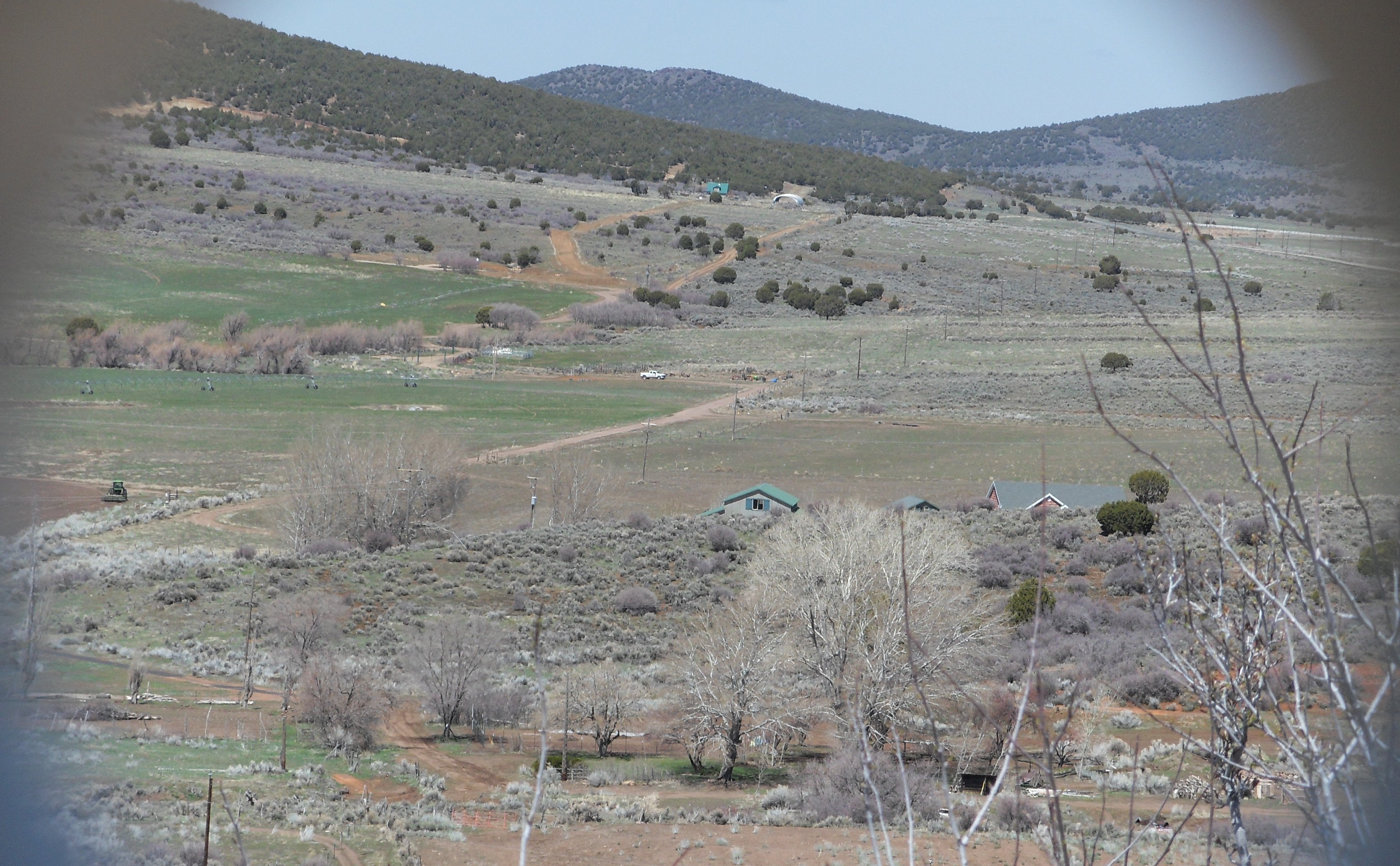
The site of the massacre, as seen through a viewfinder, from the 1990 Monument

Leonard J. Arrington reports that Brigham Young received a rider at his office on the same day of the massacre. This letter asked Young's opinion on what to do with the Baker–Fancher party. When he learned what was contemplated by the members of the LDS Church in Parowan and Cedar City, he sent back a letter that the Baker–Fancher party be allowed to pass through the territory unmolested. Young's letter supposedly arrived two days too late, on September 13, 1857. However Jon Krakauer claims that Brigham Young and other Utah territory officials encouraged the massacre beforehand and sought to deny their roles afterward.

Some of the property of the dead was reportedly taken by the Native Americans involved, while large amounts of cattle and personal property was taken by the Mormons in Southern Utah. John D. Lee took charge of the livestock and other property that had been collected at the Mormon settlement at Pinto. Some of the cattle was taken to Salt Lake City and traded for boots. Some reportedly remained in the hands of John D. Lee. The remaining personal property of the Baker–Fancher party was taken to the tithing house at Cedar City and auctioned off to local Mormons. Brigham Young reportedly ordered an investigation into the massacre, initially. However, his continued unwillingness to work with Federal authorities likely contributed to the delay of the revelation of the massacre, and was part of the reason two trials were necessary.

== Family legends ==
Several histories and legends have been passed down from the surviving children, the oldest of whom was only 6 years of age during the massacre, to today's descendants; some of these stories tell a slightly different tale of the massacre.

== Surviving children ==
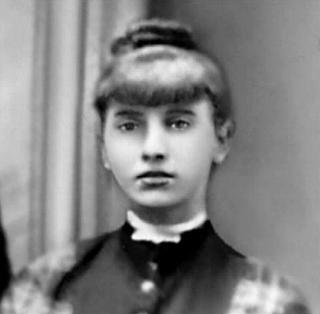
Survivor Nancy Saphrona Huff (4) was taken away along with her family's possessions by John Willis to reside at his house until she was returned to relatives in Arkansas two years later.

Seventeen small children, all under the age of seven, survived the Mountain Meadows massacre. Two years after the Massacre, the orphans were returned to their families. The following is a list of the surviving children:

List of Child Survivors of Mountain Meadows Massacre
| Name | | Age at time of massacre | Listed on monument | |
| Last | First | Age at time of massacre | 1955 | 1990 |
|---|---|---|---|---|
| Baker, | Mary Elizabeth | 5 | Yes | Yes |
| Baker, | Sarah Frances | 2 | Yes | Yes |
| Baker, | William Twitty | 0 (9 months) | Yes | Yes |
| Dunlap, | Rebecca Jane (Note: Initial J. definied as "Jane" in Massacre at Mountain Meadows (2008).) | 6 | Yes | Yes |
| Dunlap, | Louisa | 4 | Yes | Yes |
| Dunlap, | Sarah Ann. (Note: Listed as "Sarah Elizabeth" in Massacre at Mountain Meadows (2008).) | 1 | Yes | Yes |
| Dunlap, | Prudence Angeline | 5 | Yes | Yes |
| Dunlap, | Georgia Ann | 1 (18 months) | Yes | Yes |
| Fancher, | Christopher "Kit" Carson | 5 | Yes | Yes |
| Fancher, | Triphenia D. | 1 (22 months) | Yes | Yes |
| Huff, | Nancy Saphrona [Cates] | 4 | Yes | Yes |
| Jones, | Felix Marion | 1 (18 months) | Yes | Yes |
| Miller, | John Calvin | 6 | Yes | Yes |
| Miller, | Mary | 4 | Yes | Yes |
| Miller, | Joseph | 1 | Yes | Yes |
| Tackitt, | Emberson Milum | 4 | Yes | Yes |
| Tackitt, | William Henry | 1 (19 months) | Yes | Yes |

== Aftermath ==
Following the massacre, the perpetrators swore each other to secrecy, and the murdered members of the wagon train were hastily buried; yet the elements and scavengers quickly uncovered their corpses. Two years after the massacre, United States Army officer James Henry Carleton was sent to investigate it. He was convinced that the Mormons were the main perpetrators. Some of these children, who had seen their families killed, recalled seeing white men dressed as Indians among the attackers. Carleton examined the scene of the massacre and believed that the Paiutes had played a minimal role, and that the attack had been planned and executed by the Mormons. The remains of about thirty-four people were found and buried. The troops then built a cairn over the graves, and made a large cross from local cedar trees, the transverse beam bearing the engraving, "Vengeance Is Mine, Saith The Lord: I Will Repay". This cross was placed at the top of cairn and a large slab of granite was leaned upon the side, with the engraving:

Here 120 men, women, and children were massacred in cold blood early in September, 1857. They were from Arkansas.

Some claim that, in 1861, Young brought an entourage to Mountain Meadows and had the cairn and cross destroyed, while exclaiming, "Vengeance is mine and I have taken a little".
