= Remembrances of the Mountain Meadows Massacre =

Overview of the aftermath of the 1857 killing of emigrants by Mormon militiamen

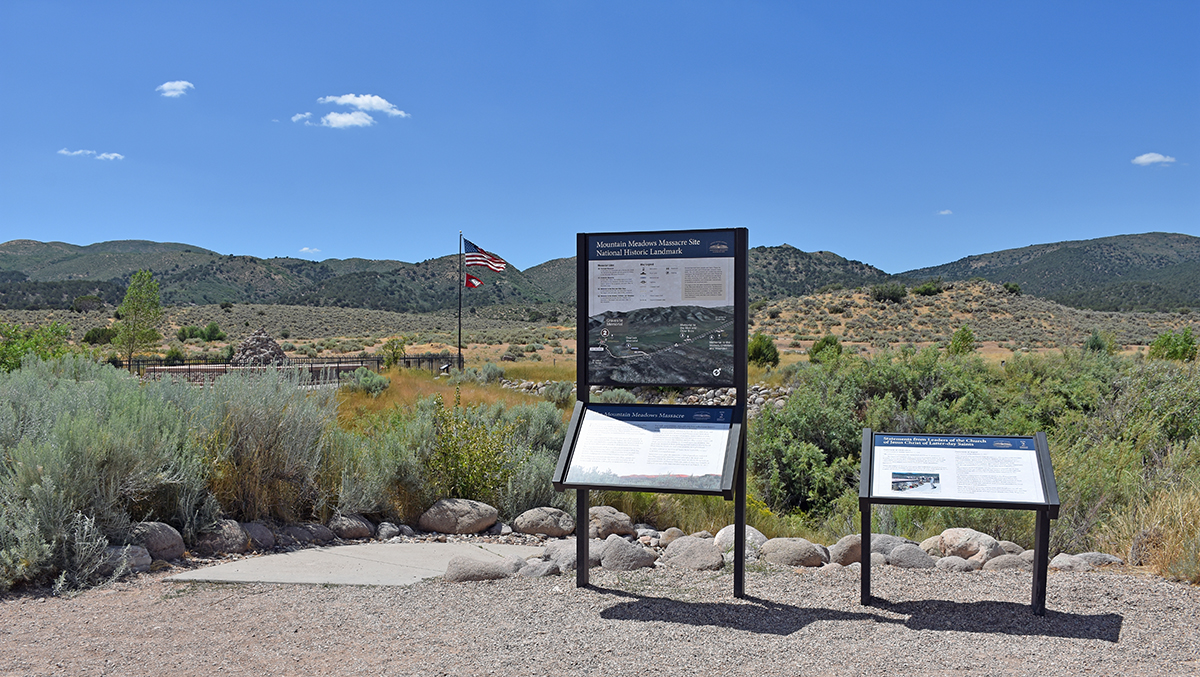
Interpretive signage at the massacre site, with the 1999 monument seen in the background

There have been several remembrances of the Mountain Meadows Massacre including commemorative observances, the building of monuments and markers, and the creation of associations and other groups to help promote the massacre's history and ensure protection of the massacre site and grave sites.

== Markers and monuments ==
=== In the State of Utah ===
==== 1859 ====
===== Southern/siege gravesite =====
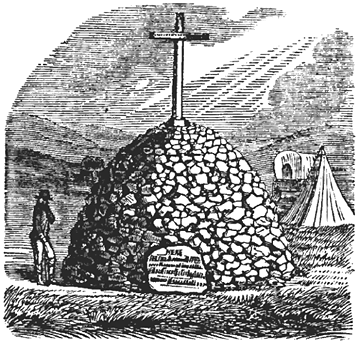
A representation of the original 1859 cairn monument at Mountain Meadows.

In May 1859, Major James H. Carleton, of the U.S. Army, and Cavalry arrived at Mountain Meadows with orders to bury the bones of the massacre's victims. After searching the area, the remains of 34 victims were buried on the northern side of a ditch. (This ditch was a defensive trench dug by the emigrants to protect themselves from their attackers.) Around and above this grave a rude monument was built of loose granite stones, creating a cairn. It was conical in form, fifty feet in circumference at the base, twelve feet in height and supported a cross hewn from red cedar wood. From the ground to the top of the cross was twenty-four feet. On the transverse part of the cross, facing towards the north, was an inscription carved in the wood from Romans 12:19:

Vengeance is mine: I will repay, saith the Lord.

On a crude slab of granite set in the earth and leaning against the northern base of the monument were cut the following words:

Here 120 men, women, and children were massacred in cold blood early in September, 1857. They were from Arkansas.

During a tour of southern Utah Brigham Young, along with some 60 church members visited the massacre site in May 1861. After viewing the inscription on the cross, Wilford Woodruff recorded President Young as saying "it should be vengeance is mine and I have taken a little." The cross was then torn down and the rocks of the cairn were dismantled, leaving little of the original marker.

====== Later reconstructions ======
In May 1864, Captain George F. Price and a company of Cavalry found the 1859 memorial and grave had been desecrated. The monument had been torn down, the cross taken away and the stones forming the monument scattered on the valley floor; while the mass-grave underneath had been defaced.

Captain Price and the Cavalry immediately proceeded to repair the grave and rebuild the monument. The structure erected was of stone, creating a new cairn, measuring twelve feet square at the base and four feet high, compactly filled in with loose stone and earth. From the square rose a pyramidal column seven feet high. The center of column supported a cedar pole with a horizontal member attached representing the Christian Cross and making the height of the monument fourteen feet. On the side of the cross facing east were inscribed the words:

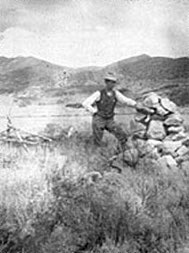
Early cairn at Mountain Meadows. (Date unknown)

Vengeance is mine, I will repay saith the Lord
Mountain Meadow massacre, September 1857

On the opposite side were the words:

Erected by the officers and men of Company M, 2d California Cavalry, May 24th and 25th, 1864.

The grave was repaired by filling it with earth, rounding it on the surface and covering it with a layer of protective stones.

Lorenzo Brown, recorded that when passing through Mountain Meadows, on July 1, 1864, he noticed someone had carved "Remember Haun's Mill and Carthage Jail" just below the biblical passage on the cross.

Following its reconstruction, the monument continued to face vandalism and was torn down at least one more time in 1870, only to be rebuilt soon after.

===== Northern gravesites =====
Prior to the construction of Major Carleton's monument, while waiting to rendezvous with the major at Mountain Meadows in 1859, assistant surgeon Charles Brewer was placed in charge of a burial detail by Captain Reuben T. Campbell of Camp Floyd. Brewer gathered the remains of 26 victims, burying them in three mass graves (located one and one-half miles north of where Carleton would construct his monument). Each of these gravesites were marked by a mound of stones. Unlike the southern gravesite, the exact location of these graves was lost throughout time.

In 2014, archaeologist Everett Bassett discovered rock piles he believes mark the location of these northern graves. The locations of the possible graves are on private land and not at any of the monument sites owned by the LDS Church. The Mountain Meadows Monument Foundation has expressed their desire that the sites are conserved and given national monument status. Other descendant groups have been more hesitant in accepting the sites as legitimate graves.

==== 1932 ====
Because the cairn had been vandalized, destroyed and rebuilt several times over the 70 years since its original construction, the citizens of southern Utah decided that something more needed to be done. On August 20, 1932, 73 men began work on a new wall which would surround the remains of the 1859 cairn. This wall enclosed an area of about 30 X 35 feet (11 m) and averaged 4 feet (1.2 m) high. A small set of steps on the western side allowed access into the enclosed area so visitors could view the remains of the cairn. The Utah Pioneer Trails and Landmarks Association installed a bronze plaque near the steps on which was written:

No. 17 – Erected 1932
Mountain Meadows
A favorite recruiting place on the Old Spanish Trail
In this vicinity, September 7–11, 1857 occurred one of the most lamentable tragedies in the annals of the west. A company of about 140 Arkansas and Missouri Emigrants led by Captain Charles Fancher, en route to California, was attacked by white men and Indians. All but 17, being small children, were killed. John D. Lee, who confessed participation as leader, was legally executed here March 23, 1877. Most of the Emigrants were buried in their own defense pits.

This monument was reverently dedicated September 10, 1932 by The Utah Pioneer Trails and Landmarks Association and The People of Southern Utah.

The dedication of this new memorial wall and plaque was held on September 10, 1932, and as many as 400 persons were reported to have been present. In the group was local LDS Stake President, William R. Palmer, the main proponent of the project.

32 years later, in April 1965, the property (2.5 acres) on which the 1859 cairn and 1932 memorial wall stood was donated to the Church of Jesus Christ of Latter-day Saints (LDS Church) by the Lytle Family. Following this donation the Church began to "discourage visitors" to the site. Signs were removed along with a picnic table, and the condition of the road leading to the monument degraded and became impassable. Later the signs were replaced and the County of Washington began to maintain the road so visitors could once again visit the site. In September 1990, the 1932 plaque was replaced with a newer marker in conjunction with construction of the 1990 monument on Dan Sill Hill. The new plaque read:

MOUNTAIN MEADOWS MASSACRE

This stone memorial marks the burial site for some of those killed in the Mountain Meadows Massacre in September 1857. The Baker-Fancher party camped here – a well-known stopping place along the Old Spanish Trail.

The first memorial was erected at this location in May 1859 by Brevet Major James H. Carleton and 80 soldiers of the First Dragoons from Fort Tejon, California. Assisting were Captains Reuben P. Campbell and Charles Brewer, with 201 from Camp Floyd, Utah. The bones of about 34 of the emigrants were buried here. The remains of others were buried one and one-half miles to the north, near the place of the massacre.

The original memorial – consisting of a stone cairn topped with a cedar cross and a small granite marker set against the north side of the cairn – was not maintained. The Utah Trails and Landmarks Association built a protective wall around what remained of the 1859 memorial and, on September 10, 1932, installed a bronze marker. That marker was replaced with the present inscription in conjunction with the dedication of the nearby memorial on September 15, 1990.

The 1932 stone wall was removed when the 1999 monument and cairn replica was constructed.

==== 1990 ====
1990 Monument

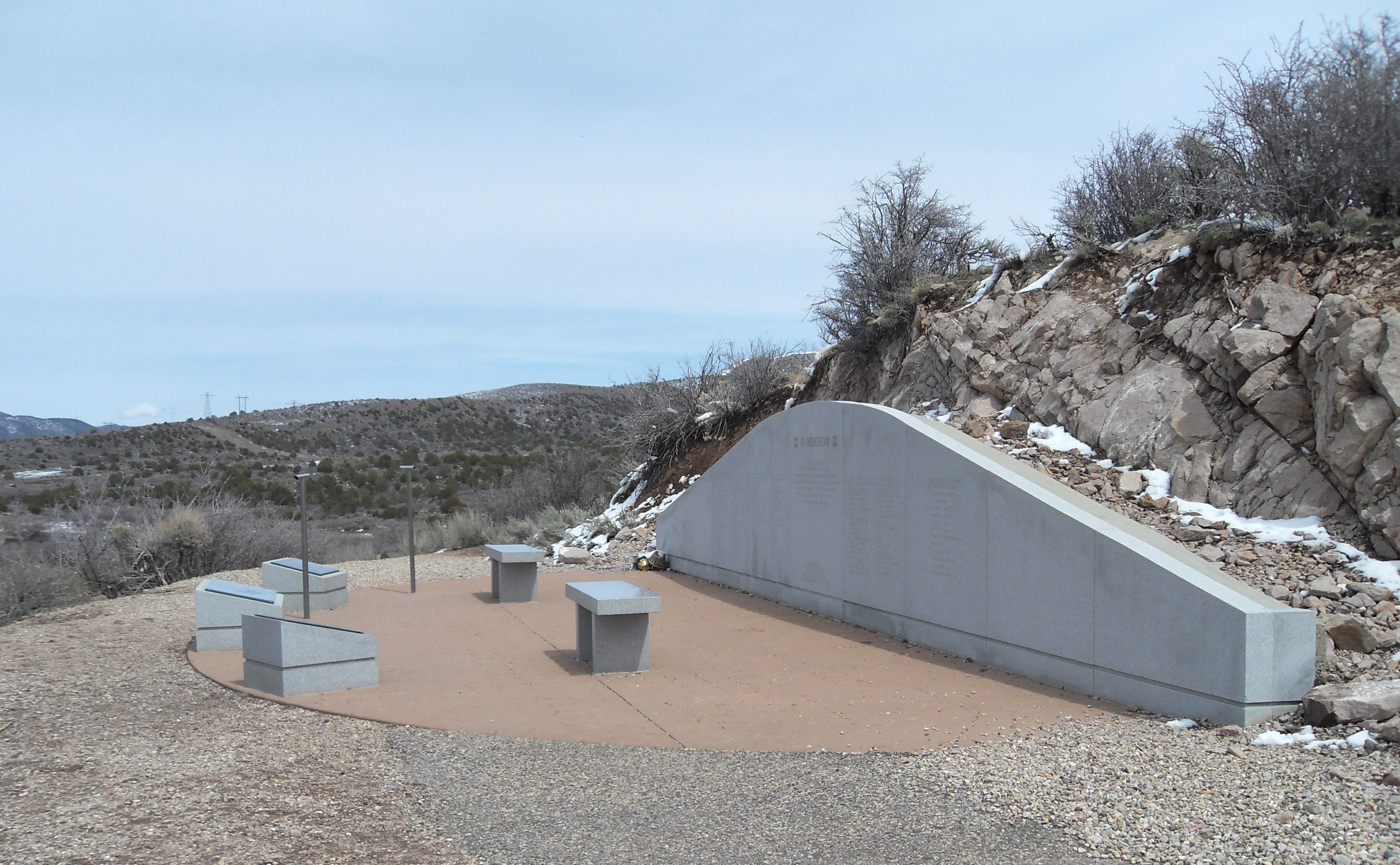
1990 Monument at Mountain Meadows, as seen in 2010

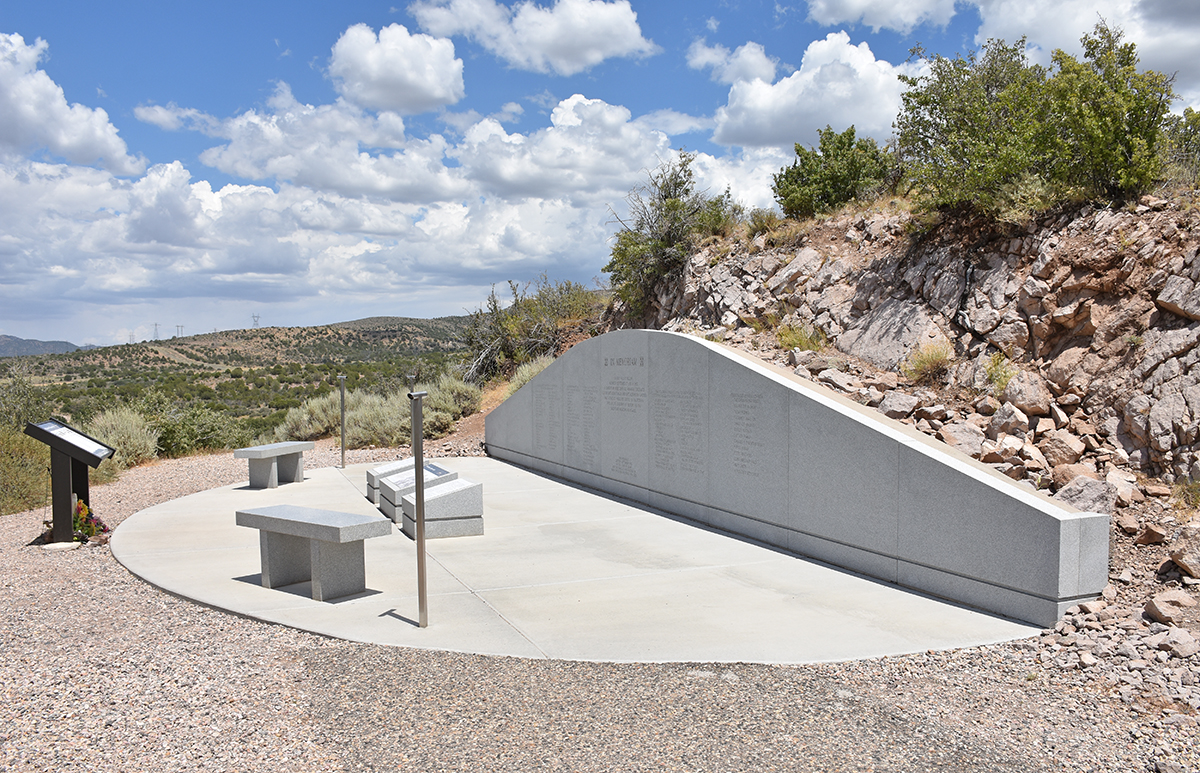
The monument following a reconfiguration and new signage that was added in 2017

On September 15, 1990, descendants with support from the LDS Church and the State of Utah dedicated a new monument to the victims. The monument was constructed atop Dan Sill Hill, on property owned by the U.S. Forest Service, which overlooks the meadows. The monument is accessible from a small parking lot and is located on a path which winds its way around the rim of the hill.

This monument was built of granite and the names of the victims and survivors are inscribed on the front. In the middle of the monument a small inscription gives some interpretive information:

IN MEMORIAM

In the valley below between September 7 and 11, 1857, a company of more than 120 Arkansas emigrants led by Capt. John T. Baker And Capt. Alexander Fancher was attacked while en route to California. This event is known in history as the Mountain Meadows Massacre.

During the dedication of this monument more than 2,000 people attended a memorial service at Southern Utah University. Participants in the memorial service included Judge Roger V. Logan, Jr. of Harrison, Arkansas, J. K. Fancher, representing the emigrant families, tribal chairwoman Geneal Anderson and spiritual leader Clifford Jake, representing the Paiute tribe, Rex E. Lee, representing descendants of LDS pioneer families from the area, and then–First Counselor in the LDS Church's First Presidency Gordon B. Hinckley, representing the Church.

The following are quotes from an article, written about the event, in the Saint George, Utah, Spectrum newspaper:

J.K. Francher, a Harrison, Ark., pharmacist and freelance writer, said...[that he] never dreamed that a memorial service would come to fruition but "the spirit kicked in" and people of differing religious beliefs have reconciled. "The most difficult words for men to utter is 'I'm sorry and I forgive you'."Easing the burden of the victims was also the goal of Paiute Indian Tribal Chairwoman Geneal Anderson of Cedar City....

During the ceremony, descendants of both the victims and perpetrators joined arms on stage hugging and embracing each other following a challenge by Rex E. Lee, Brigham Young University president.... Gordon B. Hinckley...said he came as a representative of a church that has suffered much over what happened. While people can't comprehend what occurred...Hinckley said he was grateful for reconciliation by the descendants on both sides...."Now if there is need for forgiveness, we ask that it be granted."

By 1999, President Hinckley's tone would change dramatically during a speech given at Mountain Meadows when he stated, "That which we have done here must never be construed as an acknowledgment of the part of the church of any complicity in the occurrences of that fateful day." Following the memorial service at SUU buses took descendants and other guests to tour the new monument.

In 1998, damage from frost and a small earthquake toppled the slabs of granite and the monument lay in pieces until the fall of that year. Today the monument is maintained by the Utah State Division of Parks and Recreation.

==== 1999 ====
Following the visit of Church President Gordon B. Hinckley to the Meadows in October 1998, the Church announced plans to improve their property in the area, which included replacing the 1859 cairn and 1932 memorial wall. The Church's architects drew up plans for the new monument and meetings were held with church representatives and descendants of the victims. Work began on the monument in May 1999, with much of it being contributed by a local Enterprise LDS Ward.

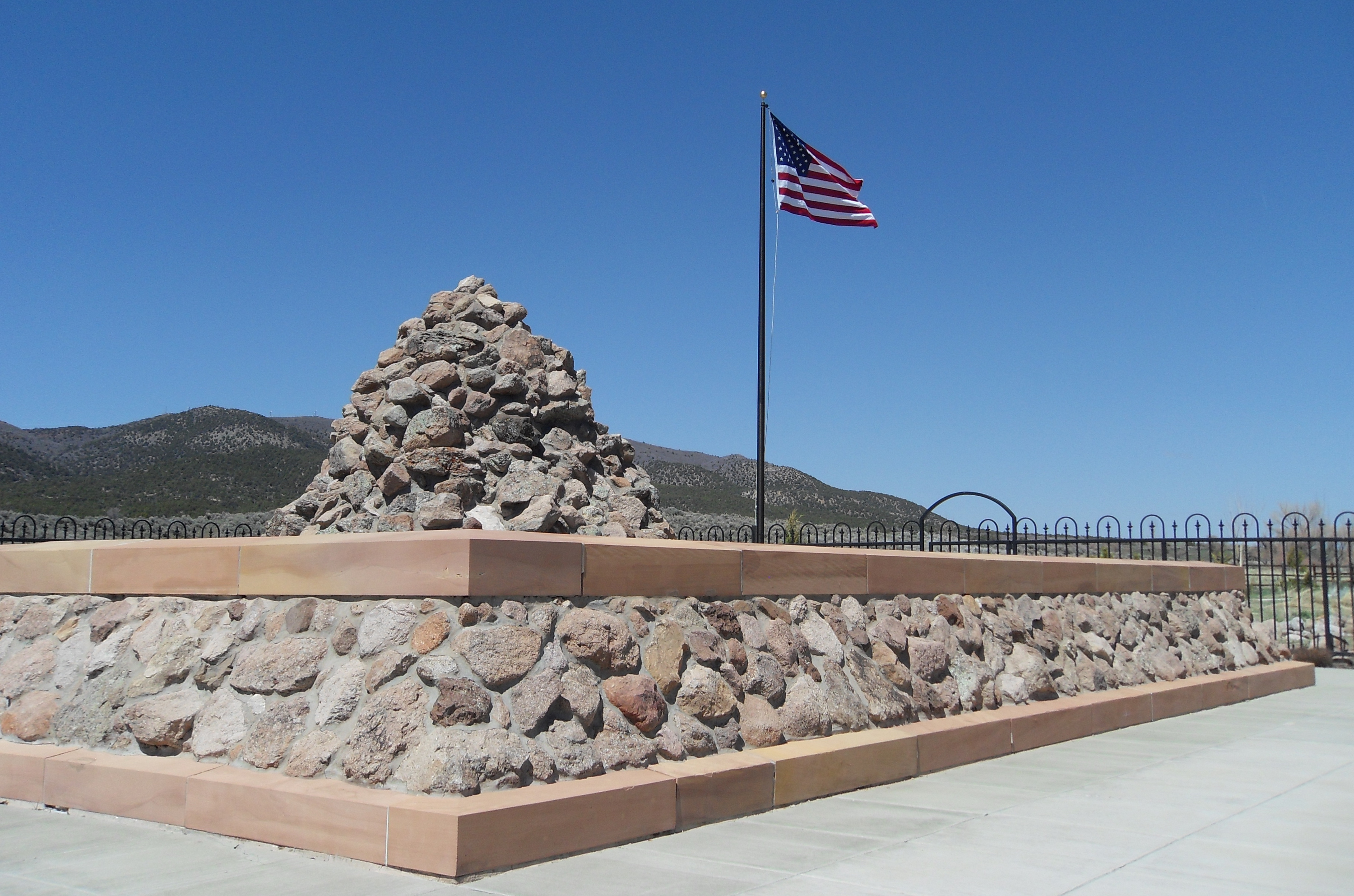
The 1999 Monument and cairn replica

This monument was dedicated September 11, 1999, the 142nd anniversary of the massacre. 1,000 people attended, including President Hinckley, locals and many descendants.

This new monument consisted of a reconstructed cairn surrounded by a rock wall, which in turn was surrounded by a small plaza and black iron fence. To ensure that the walls of the monument would last longer than the original, it was required to dig footings, and a backhoe was brought in to do the work. On August 3, 1999, after only a few scoops of dirt, the backhoe's bucket brought up a large amount of skeletal remains and the digging was immediately stopped. Prior to the digging, the area had been tested and examined by experts from Brigham Young University, the U.S. Forest Service and The Army Corps of Engineers. They had all agreed that the area was clear and okay to excavate.

By August 6, Utah State archeologist Kevin Jones had issued a permit to excavate the site and gather up the remains for an examination (as required by state law). At first the remains were taken to BYU where they were cleaned and sorted. Kevin Jones asked Shannon A. Novak of the University of Utah and her intern Derinna Kopp to do the analysis, and soon the remains were taken to the University of Utah's Department of Anthropology. After learning of this accidental discovery of the remains, many of the descendants were upset and requested that the study not be released to the public and the remains be immediately reinterred. Originally it was decided that the remains—with the exception of the skulls and other cranial fragments—would be reinterred on September 10, 1999, in a family service. The skulls were to remain at the University of Utah for further study and analysis and would be interred with the other remains following the study. Both the descendants and LDS Church were opposed to this plan, so on September 8, Utah Governor Michael Leavitt ordered that all the remains, including the skulls, were to be reinterred during the family service in two days. Shannon A. Novak had to rush through the remainder of the analysis to finish in time. Laurel Casjens of the Utah Museum of Natural History was brought in to photograph the bones and they were packed up and returned to BYU. Shannon A. Novak later published a book, entitled House of Mourning: A Biocultural History of the Mountain Meadows Massacre, containing some of the results of her analysis.

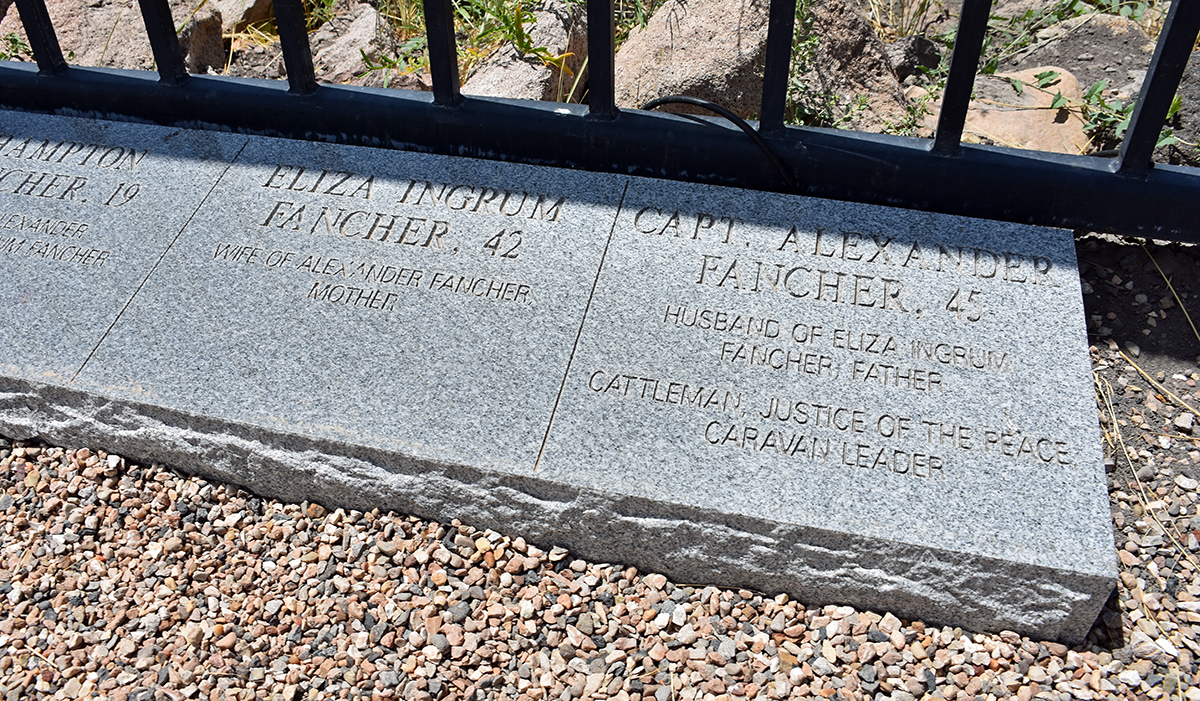
Granite memorial markers for each known individual killed during the massacre were added to the 1999 monument in 2017; the markers pictured memorialize Alexander and Eliza Fancher

On the morning of September 10, BYU transported the remains to Spilsbury & Beard Mortuary in St. George, Utah, where they were packed into four oak ossuaries by descendants. Family members then held a small memorial service in the meadows and interred the ossuaries into a specially built vault under the newly finished 1999 monument. Family members who had arrived from Arkansas brought dirt from that state, which was added into the vault along with the ossuaries. Following the burial service, preparations began for the dedication of the new monument, which was to be held the following day.

The same day in which the remains were reinterred, the Mountain Meadows Association added two new interpretive signs along the path leading to the 1990 monument in order to help visitors understand the significance of the site.

Soon after its construction, the 1999 monument began slipping into the nearby ravine, so during the summer of 2004 a cement retaining wall was constructed by the Church to help stabilize the area. In 2007 a vault toilet was constructed near the monument. The toilet was built by the State of Utah, which continues to maintain it. A 2001 attempt to build a toilet was stalled when a member of the Mountain Meadows Association complained that the association's name would not be included on the restroom.

On September 9, 2017, the skull of a child was interred in a vault at the base of the cairn (next to the other remains buried in 1999). The skull, which belonged to a child killed by a gunshot to the back of the head, was gathered by Major Carleton's soldiers during the burial of victims in May 1859. The skull was eventually forwarded to the Army Medical Museum (today known as the National Museum of Health and Medicine) in 1864, where it remained until 2017. Additionally, in 2017, granite memorial markers containing the names of all known victims were placed around the interior perimeter of the fence which surrounds the 1999 monument.

==== 2011 ====
Monuments added in the 2010s

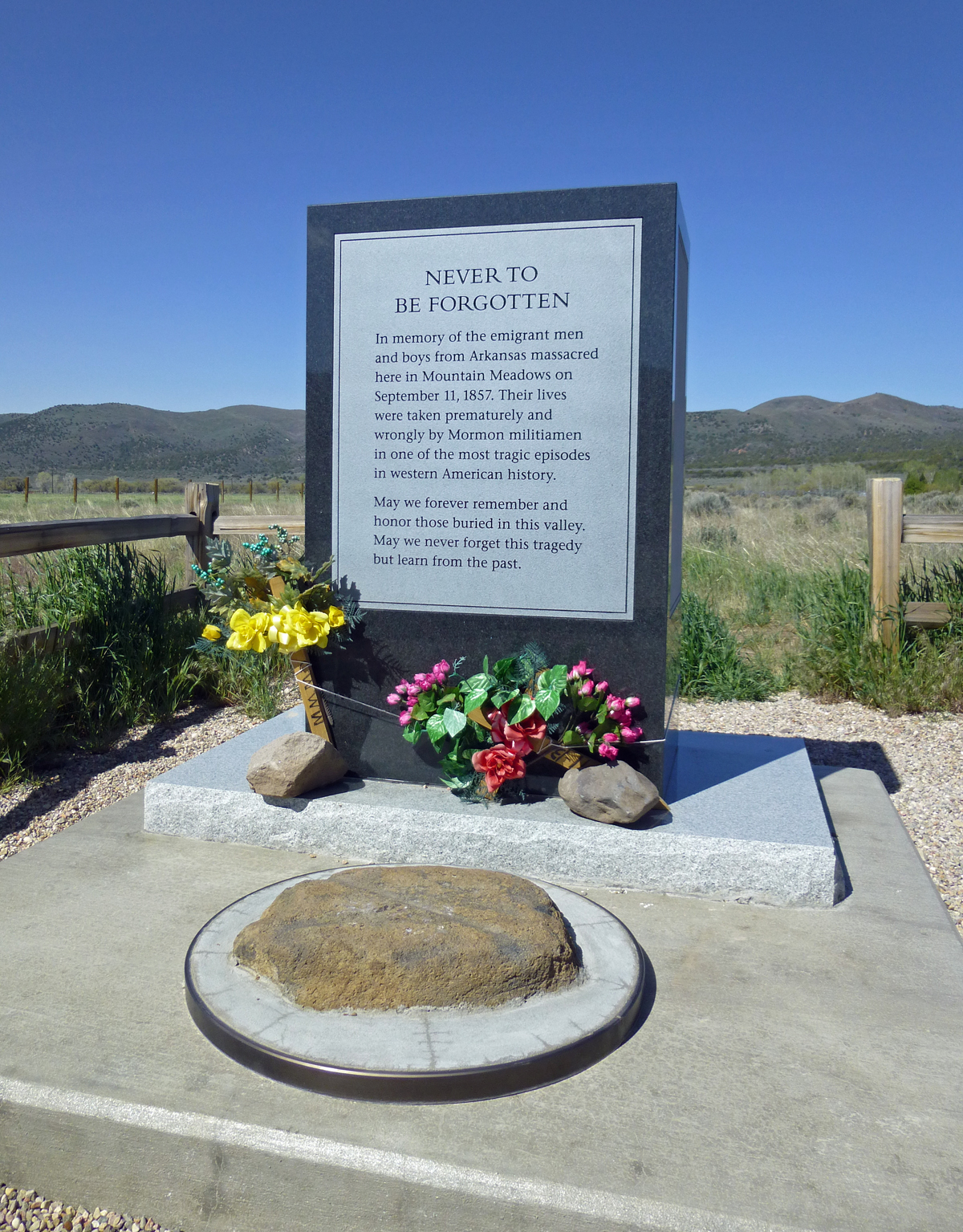
2011 Men and Boys Monument

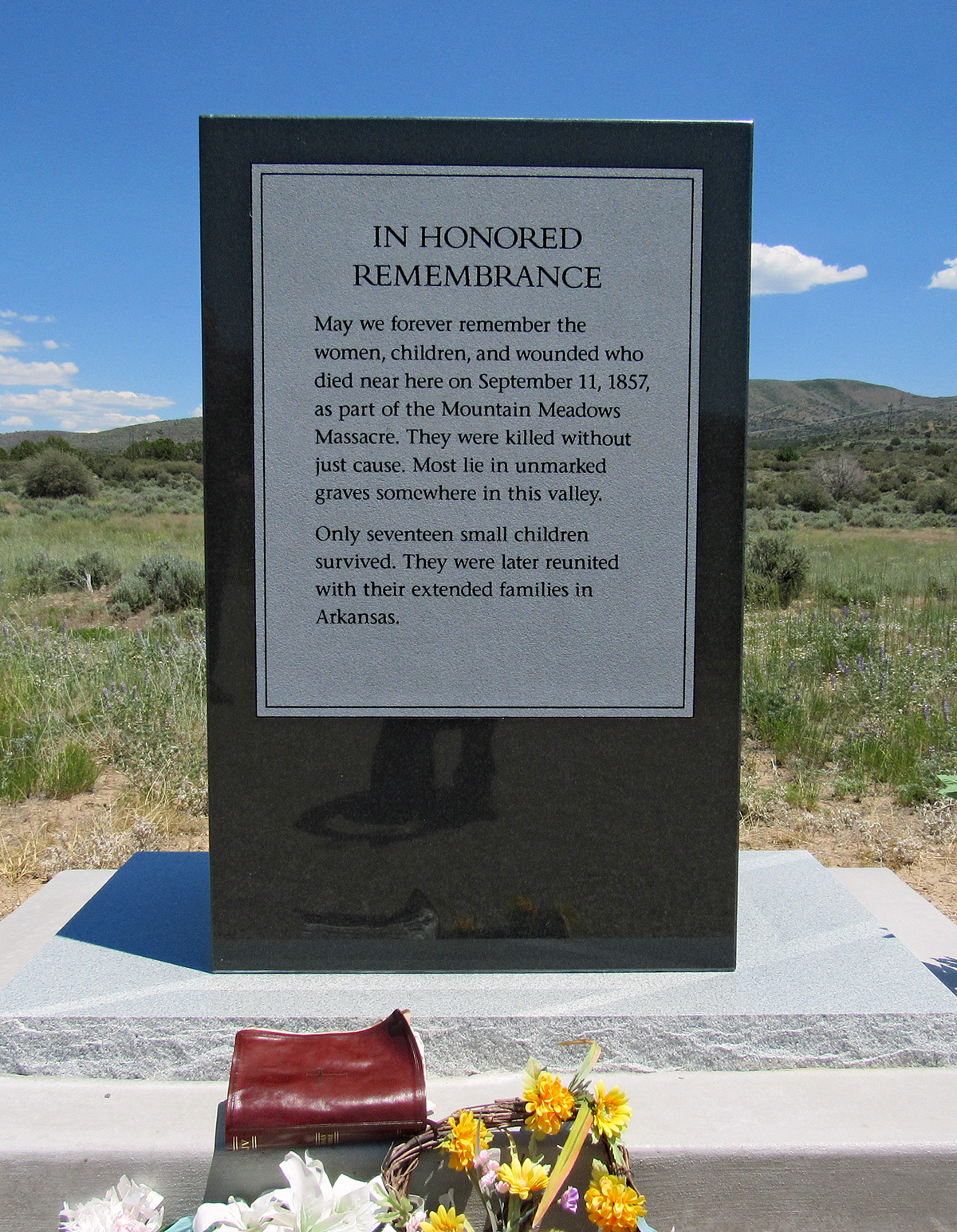
2014 Women, Children, and Wounded Monument

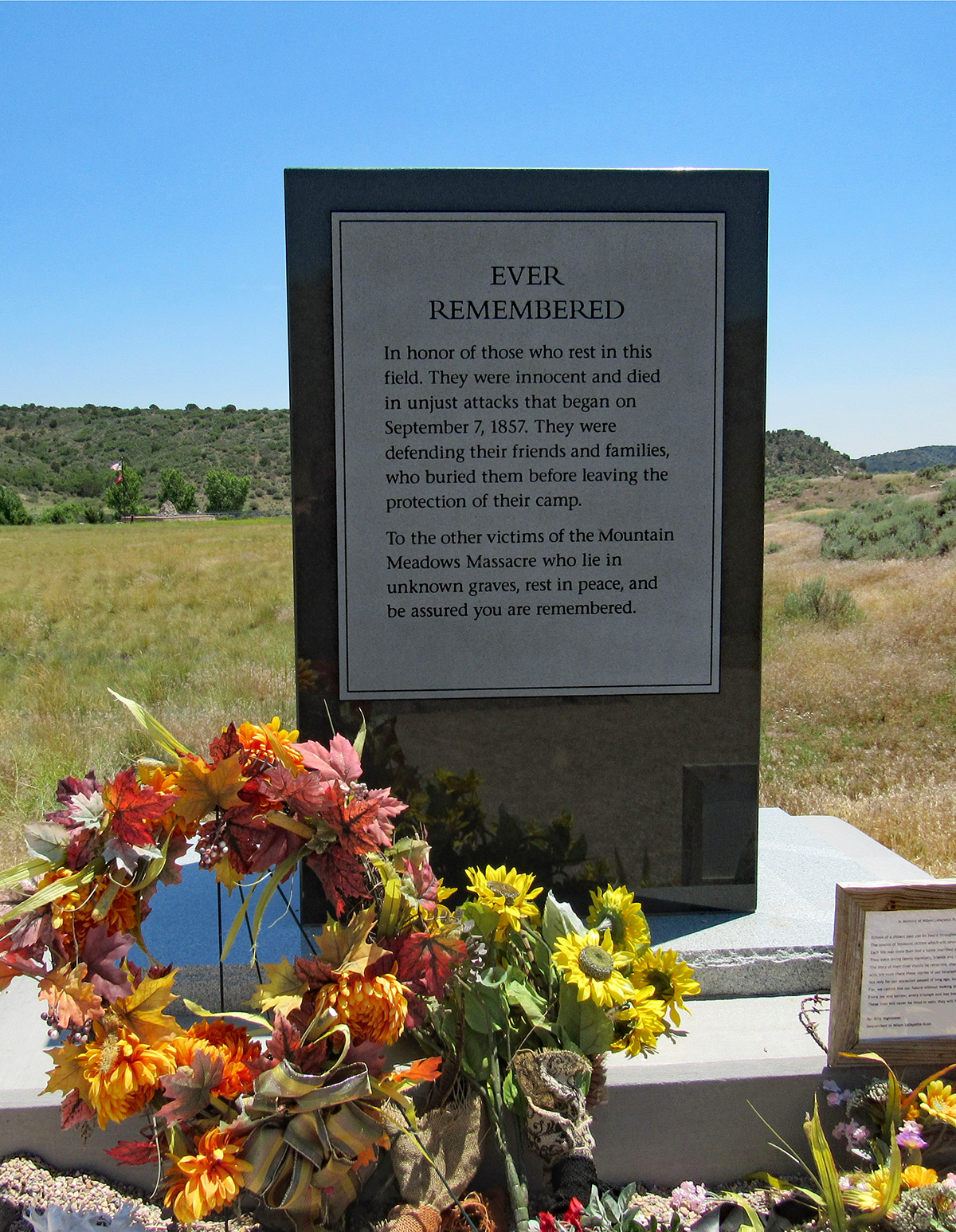
2014 Siege Monument/"Monument to the 10"

During May 2009, in accordance to the wishes of some descendants, the LDS Church purchased 16 more acres of land in the Meadows. This parcel of land is believed to be the location where the men and boys of the wagon train were killed and may contain the "upper gravesite." On September 10, 2011, a new memorial site, built by the LDS Church in remembrance of the men and boys who were killed, was dedicated on this land. The memorial, located a mile northeast of the siege site and 1999 monument, includes a large polished stone monument and a rock embedded in the surrounding cement. Etched into the rock is a cross and it is believed the rock was once part of a cairn erected to cover the human remains found in the years following the massacre; two stone benches and an interpretive marker were also erected as part of the memorial.

==== 2014 ====
On September 11, 2014, two new monuments in the Meadows were dedicated. The first monument, sometimes referred to as the "Monument to the 10," was built overlooking the siege site and honors those killed in the initial attack. To provide access to this monument, a looped walking trail leading from the 1999 monument and cairn replica was constructed. The second monument dedicated that day honors the women, children, and wounded who were killed during the massacre. This monument is believed to be located near the site where these individuals were killed, and is located the furthest from the location of the initial attack of the massacre.

Also in September 2014, a "Remembrance and Reconciliation Quilt" was unveiled in the historic Washington County Courthouse in St. George, Utah. A second companion quilt hangs at the Carroll County Historical and Genealogical Society, in Berryville, Arkansas.

==== 2017 ====
In 2017, 19 new signs containing interpretive information were added to all monument sites in the meadows. The information on each sign was written by a sign committee composed of representatives from the three descendant groups and the LDS Church, with input from other stakeholders. The new signage replaced most of the older interpretive signs added at the various monuments throughout the years. The 2017 signs present, in a uniform format, a consistent history of the massacre, based on the most recent scholarship.

==== Historical site status ====
A majority of the Mountain Meadows massacre site is listed on the National Register of Historic Places and has been since 1975; the site was also designated a National Historic Landmark in 2011. The LDS Church began working on National Historic Landmark status for the site—following requests from descendant groups—in 2007. The Church hired an independent company, Paula S. Reed and Associates, Inc., to research the massacre and prepare the necessary documentation for the landmark application. The application for landmark status was presented to the Landmark Committee of the National Park Service Advisory Board by representatives of the Church and descendant groups in Washington, D.C., on November 3, 2010. The Landmark Committee reviewed the application and took public comment on the issue, and then recommended to the National Park Service Advisory Board approval of the nomination. The Advisory Board met on April 13, 2011, to review the application and submitted their recommendation to the Secretary of the Interior, Ken Salazar. On June 30, 2011, Salazar announced that the site had been designated a National Historic Landmark.

In 2015, the boundaries of the national historic landmark designation were expanded to include a third parcel of land, which includes the area believed to be where the women, children and wounded were killed.

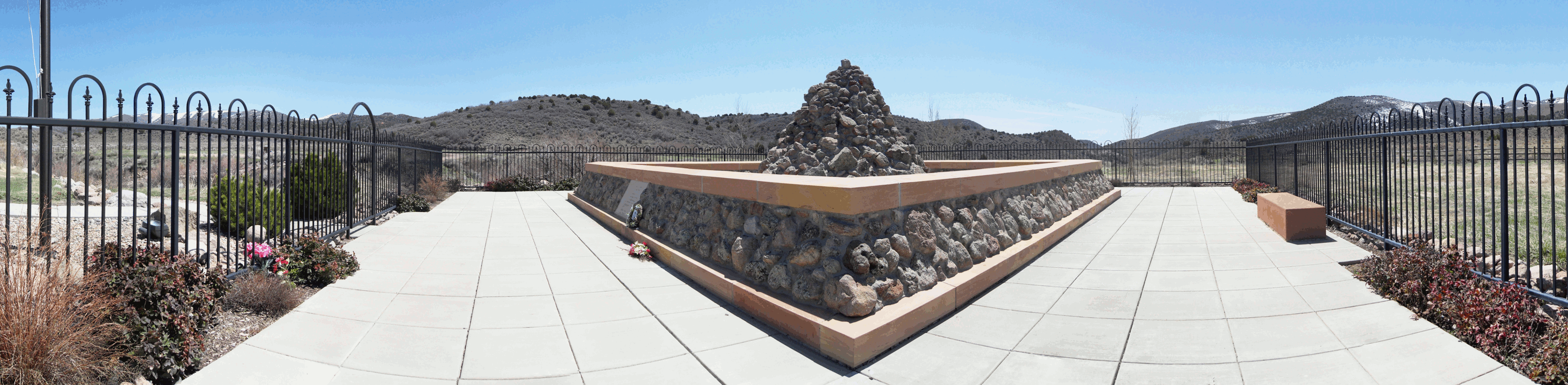
Panoramic view of the 1999 Monument at Mountain Meadows

=== In the State of Arkansas ===
==== 1936 ====
A small metal marker was placed near Milum Spring, (Also known as Beller's Spring or Caravan Spring) the site where some of the emigrants began their journey from Arkansas to California. The following is inscribed upon this marker:

Boone County – Caravan Spring

Near this spring, in September 1857, gathered a caravan of 150 men women and children. Who here began the ill-fated journey to California. The entire party with the exception of seventeen small children was massacred at Mountain Meadows, Utah, by a body of Mormons disguised as Indians.

==== 1955 ====
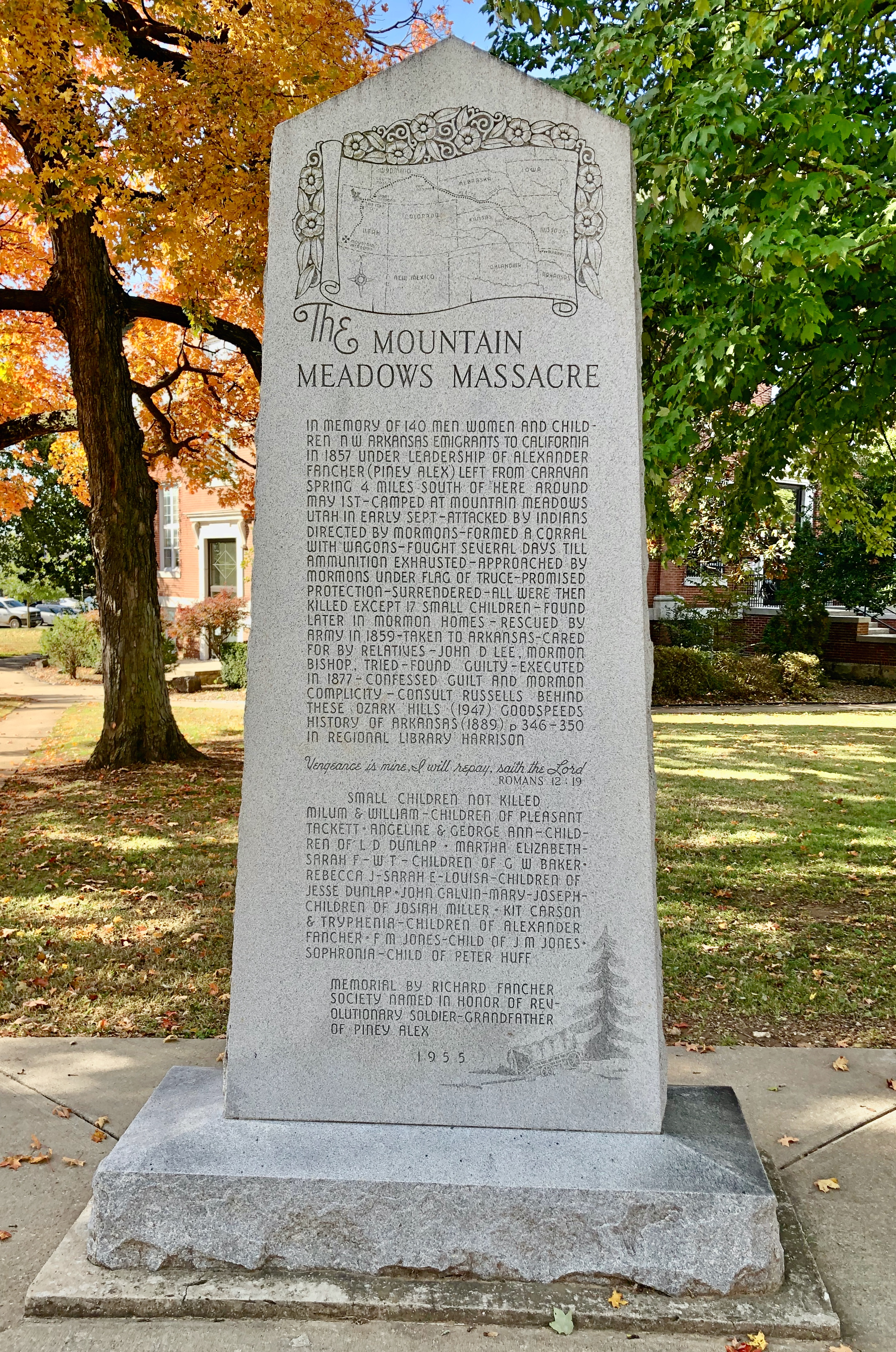
1955 monument, showing map and short summary of the massacre.

To commemorate the massacre a monument was installed in the town square of Harrison, Arkansas. It was unveiled during a Fancher Family reunion on September 4, 1955. On one side of this monument is a map and short summary of the massacre, while the opposite side contains a list of the victims.

==== 2005 ====
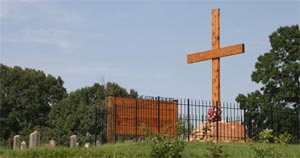
Replica of Carleton's 1859 marker, erected in 2005 in Carrollton, Arkansas.

During the summer of 2005 permission was granted to construct a replica of the 1859 cairn in Carrollton, Arkansas. This replica was built between a cemetery and the Old Yell Lodge. It was here at the site of the lodge that the surviving children of the massacre were returned to their relatives in 1859. The original lodge was destroyed by fire around the time of the Civil War, and the current lodge was not constructed until 1879 for a local group of Freemasons. But still The Mountain Meadows Monument Foundation along with a local chapter of the Veterans of Foreign Wars have renovated and restored the lodge and it currently houses displays and interpretive information about the massacre and surviving children.

The replica was dedicated on September 25, 2005, with many descendants of the massacre victims and locals in the crowd. During the dedication the stories of the surviving children were told while their descendants placed stones brought from southern Utah upon the cairn. This replica is much smaller in terms of stones than the original, but it does include a large cross facing west, towards Utah, with the words "Vengeance is mine; I will repay, saith the Lord" carved into it. To the side of the replica cairn sits a large interpretative sign with the following inscription:

The Mountain Meadows Massacre

In early 1857 a large wagon train known as the Fancher-Baker train left Caravan Spring (South of Harrison) and headed for California. They camped at this site en route to intercept the Cherokee Trail at the Grand Saline in Indian Territory. Months later, the wagon train came under siege by the Mormons and Indians in Southwest Utah at a place called Mountain Meadows. On September 11, 1857, the Mormons brutally murdered 121 Men, Women, and Children after assuring their protection. Only 17 Small Children were spared from the massacre.

The dead were left exposed to the elements until 18 months later, when U.S. Army Troops led by Major James H. Carleton buried the remains in several mass graves. A cross and stone were placed over one such gravesite containing 34 of the victims. This is a scaled replica of Carleton's original cairn.

The surviving children were brought back to Arkansas and spent their first night at the site of the Old Yell Lodge. On September 25, 1859, the orphaned children were reunited with relatives in the Carrollton Town Square.

Source: Mountain Meadows Monument Foundation, Inc.

Today this monument is often the site of descendant gatherings.

=== Other markers and monuments ===
The Mountain Meadows Monument Foundation has been instrumental in making sure the gravesites of all the surviving children have been marked with special plaques telling their stories.

== Commemorative observances ==
=== 150th Anniversary of the Massacre ===
On September 11, 2007, approximately 400 people, including many descendants of those slain at Mountain Meadows, gathered to commemorate the 150th anniversary of the massacre. At this commemoration, Elder Henry B. Eyring of the LDS Church's Quorum of the Twelve Apostles issued a statement on behalf of the LDS Church's First Presidency expressing regret for the actions of local church leaders in the massacre. During the commemoration, Elder Eyring stated, "We express profound regret for the massacre carried out in this valley 150 years ago today, and for the undue and untold suffering experienced by the victims then and by their relatives to the present time... What was done here long ago by members of our church represents a terrible and inexcusable departure from Christian teachings and conduct. We cannot change what happened, but we can remember and honor those who were killed here."

=== 150th Anniversary of the Return of the Children ===
To celebrate when the surviving children were returned to their relatives in Arkansas a commemoration was held at the Mountain Meadows massacre site on May 30, 2009. A similar commemoration was held in Arkansas on September 15, 2009, to celebrate "The Return of the Children".

=== Other observances ===
A commemorative wagon-train encampment assembled at Beller Spring, Arkansas on April 21–22, 2007, with some participants in period dress, to honor the sesquicentennial of their ancestors' embarkation on the ill-fated journey. Some descendants gathered at the meadows on May 30, 2009, in memorialize the burial of their ancestors by Major J.H. Carlton, and to begin the year-long celebration of the "Return of the Children".

Several other smaller observances, family reunions, and other group gatherings have occurred throughout the years and many still continue to be held on regular basis.

== Associations and groups ==
=== Mountain Meadows Association ===
Following a meeting between massacre victim descendant Ron Loving, and John D. Lee descendant, Verne Lee, the decision to form an association, to ensure the protection of the site and proper remembrance of the massacre, was made. By the end of 1988 the Mountain Meadows Association (MMA) had been formed and was beginning to work with the LDS Church and State of Utah towards a proper memorial at the massacre site. Following the dedication of the 1990 monument the MMA became almost non-existent, but was reorganized following the 1998 earthquake which damaged that monument. Today the MMA serves as a middle-man between the LDS Church and many of the descendants of the massacre victims.

=== Mountain Meadows Massacre Descendants ===
The Mountain Meadows Massacre Descendants (MMMD) organization was created to help descendants of the victims stay in touch with one another, and to work with the other organizations in helping protect the massacre site and ensure proper remembrance of the massacre and victims.

=== Mountain Meadows Monument Foundation ===
During 1999 some members of the MMA had become dissatisfied with the organization and created their own, The Mountain Meadows Monument Foundation, Inc. (MMMF). The main goal of the MMMF is to get the massacre site in the control of the U.S. Federal Government instead of the LDS Church. The MMMF has been instrumental in making sure the gravesites of all the surviving children have been marked with special plaques, and have helped to gather books about the massacre to donate to local libraries.
