= Mountain Meadows Massacre and Mormon theology =

Mormon theology has long been thought to be one of the causes of the Mountain Meadows Massacre. The victims of the massacre, known as the Baker–Fancher party, were passing through the Utah Territory to California in 1857. For the decade prior the emigrants' arrival, Utah Territory had existed as a theocracy led by Brigham Young. As part of Young's vision of a pre-millennial "Kingdom of God," Young established colonies along the California and Old Spanish Trails, where Mormon officials governed as leaders of church, state, and military. Two of the southernmost establishments were Parowan and Cedar City, led respectively by Stake Presidents William H. Dame and Isaac C. Haight. Haight and Dame were, in addition, the senior regional military leaders of the Mormon militia. During the period just before the massacre, known as the Mormon Reformation, Mormon teachings were dramatic and strident. The religion had undergone a period of intense persecution in the American Midwest.

== Utah Territory's political structure during massacre ==
A decade prior the Baker–Fancher party's arrival, Mormons had established in the Utah Territory a theocratic community (see theodemocracy), where Brigham Young presided over the Church of Jesus Christ of Latter-day Saints as LDS Church president and Prophet of God, until Christ's assumption of world kingship at his Second Coming.

U.S. President Millard Fillmore appointed Young as governor of the Territory of Utah and its Superintendent of Indian Affairs, but there was minimal effective separation between church and state until 1858.

Brigham Young envisioned a Mormon domain, called the State of Deseret, spanning from the Salt Lake Valley to the Pacific Ocean and so he sent church leaders to establish colonies far and wide. The colonies were governed by Mormon officials under Young's mandate to enforce "God's law" by "lay[ing] the ax at the root of the tree of sin and iniquity" and preserving individual rights. Despite the distance to these outlying colonies, local Mormon leaders received frequent visits from church headquarters, and were under Young's direct doctrinal and political control. Mormons were taught to obey the orders of their priesthood leaders, as long as they coincided with LDS gospel principles. Young's view of theocratic enforcement included a death penalty for such sins as theft. However, there are no documented cases showing that such threats were ever enforced as actual policy, and there were no accusations of thievery against the Baker–Fancher party. Mormon leaders taught the doctrine of blood atonement, in which Mormon "covenant breakers" could in theory gain their exaltation in heaven by having "their blood spilt upon the ground, that the smoke thereof might ascend to heaven as an offering for their sins." More clearly stated, the doctrine holds that capital punishment is required for offenses of murder. Mormon leaders stated that this practice was not yet "in full force,"(Young 1857b, pp. 219–220) but the time was "not far distant" that Mormons would be sacrificed out of love to ensure their eternal reward.

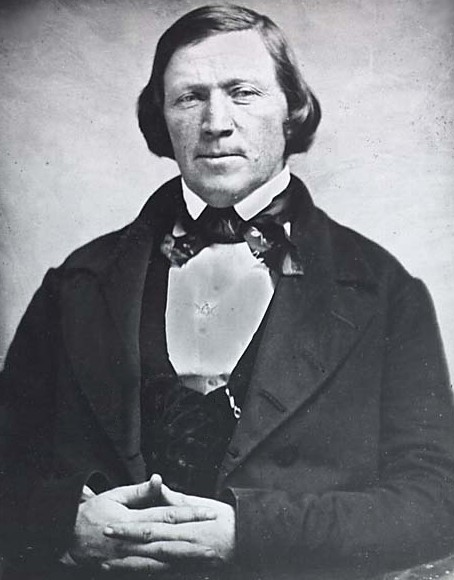
Brigham Young: LDS Church President, governor and American Indian superintendent of Utah Territory

The Mormon historian Thomas G. Alexander argues that most violent speech by LDS leaders was rhetorical in nature. He further states that statistical studies are needed to determine whether frontier Utah was in reality any more violent than surrounding regions, but he argues that the limited statistical evidence that exists, although it dates from the 1880s, shows Utah to be far less violent than other contemporaneous western states and territories. Referring to the frequent Mormon declarations that there were fewer deeds of violence in Utah than in other pioneer settlements of equal population, the Salt Lake Tribune reported on January 25, 1876: "It is estimated that no less than 600 murders have been committed by the Mormons, in nearly every case at the instigation of their priestly leaders, during the occupation of the territory. Giving a mean average of 50,000 persons professing that faith in Utah, we have a murder committed every year to every 2500 of population. The same ratio of crime extended to the population of the United States would give 16,000 murders every year." Brigham Young's typical response to such charges was undisguised sarcasm. Speaking on July 26, 1857, he stated "what is now the news circulated through the United States?... That Brigham Young has [had] killed all the men who have died between the Missouri River and California." He had previously retorted to similar charges: "just one word from Brigham, and they are ready to slay all before them...It is all a pack of nonsense, the whole of it." Whatever the case, there is a consensus that William H. Dame and Isaac C. Haight, the two most senior local church leaders in southern Utah to be complicit in the massacre, took the rhetoric of such doctrines seriously as they contemplated sanctionable applications of violence.

According to rumors and accusations, Brigham Young sometimes enforced "God's law" through a secret cadre of avenging Danites. The truth of the rumors is debated by historians. While active vigilante organizations in Utah referred to themselves as "Danites," they may have been acting independently.

Historian Leonard Arrington attributes these rumors to the actions of "Minute Men," a law enforcement organization created by Young to pursue hostile Indians and criminals. However, they became associated with the Danite vigilantes who had operated briefly in Missouri in 1838. Haight and Dame were never Danites; however, Young's records indicate that in 1857 he authorized Haight and Dame to secretly execute two recently released convicts traveling through southern Utah along the California trail if they were caught stealing cattle or other livestock. Dame replied to Young in a letter that "we try to live so when your finger crooks, we move." Haight and/or Dame might have been involved in the subsequent ambush of part of the convicts' party just south of Mountain Meadows.

== Prior Midwest persecution against Mormons and their calls for vengeance ==
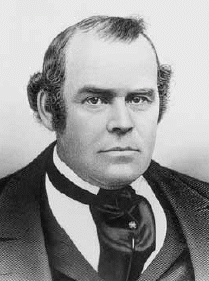
Parley P. Pratt: Mormon apostle murdered by jealous husband in Arkansas in April 1857 and viewed as martyr by Latter-day Saints

At the time of the massacre, Mormons had an acute memory of recent persecutions against them, particularly the death of their prophets, and had been taught that God would soon exact vengeance. The persecutions began in the 1830s, when the state of Missouri officially opposed their presence in the state, engaged with them in the Mormon War, and expelled them in 1838 with an Extermination Order. During the Mormon War, prominent Mormon apostle David W. Patten died of wounds suffered after leading Mormon insurgents in an attack against the Missouri Militia at Crooked Creek, and a group of Mormons were massacred at Haun's Mill. After the Mormons established a new home in Nauvoo, Illinois, in 1839, they were again forced to leave behind homes and land in Illinois after conflicts with locals culminated in the 1844 death of Joseph Smith and his brother, Patriarch Hyrum Smith by a mob of Illinois militia. Brigham Young led the majority of Mormons westward in 1846 to avoid civil war.

In Utah, just months before the Mountain Meadows Massacre, Mormons received word that yet another "prophet" had been killed: in April 1857, apostle Parley P. Pratt was shot in Arkansas by Hector McLean, the estranged husband of one of Pratt's plural wives, Eleanor McLean Pratt. Mormon leaders immediately proclaimed Pratt as another martyr, and compared his death with that of Joseph Smith. Many Mormons held the people of Arkansas responsible.

In 1857, Mormon leaders taught that the Second Coming of Jesus was imminent, and that God would soon exact punishment against the United States for persecuting Mormons and martyring "the prophets" Joseph Smith, Hyrum Smith, David W. Patten, and Parley P. Pratt. In their Endowment ceremony, faithful early Latter-day Saints took an Oath of vengeance against the murderers of the prophets. As a result of this oath, several Mormon apostles and other leaders considered it their religious duty to kill the prophets' murderers if they ever came across them.

The sermons, blessings, and private counsel by Mormon leaders just prior to the Mountain Meadows Massacre can be understood as encouraging private individuals to execute God's judgment against the wicked. In Cedar City, Utah, church leaders taught that members should ignore dead bodies and go about their business. Col. William H. Dame, the ranking officer in southern Utah who ordered the Mountain Meadows Massacre, received a patriarchal blessing in 1854 that he would "be called to act at the head of a portion of thy Brethren and of the Lamanites (Native Americans) in the redemption of Zion and the avenging of the blood of the prophets upon them that dwell on the earth.' In June 1857, Philip Klingensmith, another participant, was similarly blessed that he would participate in "avenging the blood of Brother Joseph." The train led by Alexander Fancher waited outside Salt Lake City for more than a week as other groups caught up with them. The other, led by Captain John Twitty Baker was the last to arrive. Here the groups decided which route to take across the Great Basin to California. The Northern route to the California Trail, involved travelling along the Humboldt River in Northern Nevada, west across the Nevada desert to California and across the Sierra Nevada mountains into Sacramento. This route put emigrants at risk of becoming snowbound in the Sierra Nevada mountains in California as the Donner Party had done ten years before. The Southern route went to the Old Spanish Trail, which would take them through the settlements in Southern Utah, through Southern Nevada (now Las Vegas) and then West through the arid dry Mojave Desert of San Bernardino County and eventually into Los Angeles basin. At least one couple, Henry D. and Malinda Cameron Scott, chose to take the Northern route while others from the woman's family went south with the united parties under Captain Fancher.

It was reported to Brigham Young that the party was from Arkansas. It was also rumored, as presented in the "Argus" letters that were later published in the Corinne Daily Reporter, that Eleanor McLean Pratt, one of Pratt's plural wives, recognized one of the party as being present at her husband's murder. Other sources, however, state that Eleanor Pratt herself was not present at the murder.

== Bibliography ==
- Bagley, Will (2002), Blood of the Prophets: Brigham Young and the Massacre at Mountain Meadows, Norman, Oklahoma: University of Oklahoma Press, ISBN 0-8061-3426-7.
- Bancroft, Hubert Howe (1889), The Works of Hubert Howe Bancroft: History of Utah, 1540–1886, vol. 26, San Francisco: History Company, LCCN 07018413, LCC F826.B2 1889 (Internet Archive versions).
- Beadle, John Hanson (1870), "Chapter VI. The Bloody Period.", Life in Utah, Philadelphia: National Publishing, pp. 177–195, LCCN 30005377, LCC BX8645 .B4 1870.
- Briggs, Robert H. (2006), "The Mountain Meadows Massacre: An Analytical Narrative Based on Participant Confessions" (PDF), Utah Historical Quarterly, 74 (4): 313–333, doi:10.2307/45062984, JSTOR 45062984, S2CID 254444678, archived from the original (PDF) on 2007-10-26.
- Brooks, Juanita (1950), The Mountain Meadows Massacre, Norman, Oklahoma: University of Oklahoma Press, ISBN 0-8061-2318-4.
- Buerger, David John (2002), The Mysteries of Godliness: A History of Mormon Temple Worship (2nd ed.), Salt Lake City: Signature Books, ISBN 1-56085-176-7.
- Burns, Ken; Ives, Stephen (1996), New Perspectives on the West (Documentary), Washington, D.C.: PBS, archived from the original on April 28, 2001.
- Cannon, Frank J.; Knapp, George L. (1913), Brigham Young and His Mormon Empire, New York: Fleming H. Revell Co..
- Dunn, Jacob Piatt (1886), Massacres of the Mountains: A History of the Indian Wars of the Far West, New York: Harper & Brothers.
- Erickson, Dan (1996), "Joseph Smith's 1891 Millennial Prophecy: The Quest for Apocalyptic Deliverance", Journal of Mormon History, 22 (2): 1–34, archived from the original on 2009-02-06.
- Fancher, Lynn-Marie; Wallner, Alison C. (2006), 1857: An Arkansas Primer To The Mountain Meadows Massacre.
- Fillmore, Millard (September 26, 1850), "I nominate Brigham Young, of Utah, as governor of the Territory of Utah", in McCook, Anson G. (ed.), Journal of the Executive Proceedings of the Senate of the United States of America, vol. 8, Washington, D.C.: GPO, p. 252
- Finck, James (2005), "Mountain Meadows Massacre", in Dillard, Tom W. (ed.), Encyclopedia of Arkansas History & Culture, Little Rock, Arkansas: Encyclopedia of Arkansas Project.
- Ford, Thomas (1854), A History of Illinois, from its Commencement as a State in 1818 to 1847, Chicago: S.C. Griggs & Co..
- Grant, Jedediah M. (March 12, 1854a), "Discourse", Deseret News, vol. 4, no. 20, pp. 1–2.
- Grant, Jedediah M. (April 2, 1854b), "Fulfilment of Prophecy—Wars and Commotions", in Watt, G.D. (ed.), Journal of Discourses by Brigham Young, President of the Church of Jesus Christ of Latter-Day Saints, His Two Counsellors, the Twelve Apostles, and Others, vol. 2, Liverpool: F.D. & S.W. Richards, pp. 145–149.
- Kimball, Heber C. (January 11, 1857a), "The Body of Christ-Parable of the Vine-A Wile Enthusiastic Spirit Not of God-The Saints Should Not Unwisely Expose Each Others' Follies", in Watt, G.D. (ed.), Journal of Discourses by Brigham Young, President of the Church of Jesus Christ of Latter-day Saints, His Two Counsellors, and the Twelve Apostles, vol. 4, Liverpool: S.W. Richards, pp. 164–181.
- Kimball, Heber C. (August 16, 1857b), "Limits of Forebearance-Apostates-Economy-Giving Endowments", in Watt, G.D. (ed.), Journal of Discourses by Brigham Young, President of the Church of Jesus Christ of Latter-day Saints, His Two Counsellors, and the Twelve Apostles, vol. 4, Liverpool: S.W. Richards, pp. 374–376.
- Lee, John D. (1877), Bishop, William W. (ed.), Mormonism Unveiled; or the Life and Confessions of the Late Mormon Bishop, John D. Lee, St. Louis, Missouri: Bryan, Brand & Co., ISBN 9780608380445.
- Linn, William Alexander (1902), The Story of the Mormons: From the Date of their Origin to the Year 1901, New York: Macmillan (scanned versions).
- Melville, J. Keith (1960), "Theory and Practice of Church and State During the Brigham Young Era" (PDF), BYU Studies, 3 (1): 33–55.
- Parshall, Ardis E. (2005), "'Pursue, Retake and Punish': The 1857 Santa Clara Ambush" (PDF), Utah Historical Quarterly, 73 (1): 64–86, doi:10.2307/45063638, JSTOR 45063638, S2CID 254438137, archived from the original (PDF) on 2008-08-19.
- Pratt, Parley P. (December 31, 1855), "Marriage and Morals in Utah", Deseret News, vol. 5, no. 45, pp. 356–357, archived from the original on September 2, 2012.
- Pratt, Steven (1975), "Eleanor McLean and the Murder of Parley P. Pratt" (PDF), BYU Studies, 15 (2): 225–256, archived from the original (PDF) on 2007-07-12.
- Quinn, D. Michael (1997), The Mormon Hierarchy: Extensions of Power, Salt Lake City: Signature Books, ISBN 1-56085-060-4.
- Quinn, D. Michael (2001), "LDS 'Headquarters Culture' and the Rest of Mormonism: Past and Present", Dialogue: A Journal of Mormon Thought, 34 (3–4): 135–164, doi:10.2307/45226795, JSTOR 45226795, S2CID 254336477.
- Roberts, B. H., ed. (1912), History of the Church of Jesus Christ of Latter-day Saints, vol. 6, Salt Lake City: Deseret News.
- Scott, Malinda Cameron (1877). "Malinda (Cameron) Scott Thurston Deposition". Mountain Meadows Association.
- Smith, Joseph; Cowdery, Oliver; Rigdon, Sidney; Williams, Frederick G. (1835), Doctrine and Covenants of the Church of the Latter Day Saints: Carefully Selected from the Revelations of God, Kirtland, Ohio: F. G. Williams & Co, archived from the original on 2012-05-20.
- Stenhouse, T.B.H. (1873), The Rocky Mountain Saints: a Full and Complete History of the Mormons, from the First Vision of Joseph Smith to the Last Courtship of Brigham Young, New York: D. Appleton, ASIN B00085RMQM, LCCN 16024014, LCC BX8611 .S8 1873.
- Taylor, John (April 8, 1853), "Legitimacy and Illegitimacy", in Watt, G.D. (ed.), Journal of Discourses by Brigham Young, President of the Church of Jesus Christ of Latter-Day Saints, His Two Counsellors, the Twelve Apostles, and Others, vol. 1, Liverpool: F.D. & S.W. Richards, pp. 221–233.
- Taylor, John (September 20, 1857), "Education—Revelation, Obedience, etc.", in Calkin, Asa (ed.), Journal of Discourses Delivered by President Brigham Young, His Two Counsellors, the Twelve Apostles, and Others, vol. 5, Liverpool: Asa Calkin, pp. 259–266.
- Whitney, Helen; Barnes, Jane (2007), The Mormons (Documentary), Washington, D.C.: PBS.
- Young, Brigham; Kimball, Heber C.; Hyde, Orson; Pratt, Parley P.; Smith, William; Pratt, Orson; Page, John E.; Taylor, John; Woodruff, Wilford; Smith, George A.; Richards, Willard; Lyman, Amasa M. (April 6, 1845), Proclamation of the Twelve Apostles of the Church of Jesus Christ, of Latter-Day Saints, New York: LDS Church.
- Young, Brigham (July 8, 1855), "The Kingdom of God", in Watt, G.D. (ed.), Journal of Discourses by Brigham Young, President of the Church of Jesus Christ of Latter-Day Saints, His Two Counsellors, the Twelve Apostles, and Others, vol. 2, Liverpool: F.D. & S.W. Richards, pp. 309–317.
- Young, Brigham (March 2, 1856a), "The Necessity of the Saints Living up to the Light Which Has Been Given Them", in Watt, G.D. (ed.), Journal of Discourses by Brigham Young, President of the Church of Jesus Christ of Latter-day Saints, His Two Counsellors, the Twelve Apostles, and Others, vol. 3, Liverpool: Orson Pratt, pp. 221–226.
- Young, Brigham (March 16, 1856b), "Instructions to the Bishops—Men Judged According to their Knowledge—Organization of the Spirit and Body—Thought and Labor to be Blended Together", in Watt, G.D. (ed.), Journal of Discourses by Brigham Young, President of the Church of Jesus Christ of Latter-day Saints, His Two Counsellors, the Twelve Apostles, and Others, vol. 3, Liverpool: Orson Pratt, pp. 243–249.
- Young, Brigham (March 16, 1856c), "Difficulties Not Found Among the Saints Who Live Their Religion—Adversity Will Teach Them Their Dependence on God—God Invisibly Controls the Affairs of Mankind", in Watt, G.D. (ed.), Journal of Discourses by Brigham Young, President of the Church of Jesus Christ of Latter-day Saints, His Two Counsellors, the Twelve Apostles, and Others, vol. 3, Liverpool: Orson Pratt, pp. 254–260.
- Young, Brigham (September 21, 1856d), "The People of God Disciplined by Trials—Atonement by the Shedding of Blood—Our Heavenly Father—A Privilege Given to all the Married Sisters in Utah", in Watt, G.D. (ed.), Journal of Discourses by Brigham Young, President of the Church of Jesus Christ of Latter-day Saints, His Two Counsellors, and the Twelve Apostles, vol. 4, Liverpool: S.W. Richards, pp. 51–63.
- Young, Brigham (February 8, 1857b), "To Know God is Eternal Life—God the Father of Our Spirits and Bodies—Things Created Spiritually First—Atonement by the Shedding of Blood", in Watt, G.D. (ed.), Journal of Discourses by Brigham Young, President of the Church of Jesus Christ of Latter-day Saints, His Two Counsellors, and the Twelve Apostles, vol. 4, Liverpool: S.W. Richards, pp. 215–221.
- Young, Brigham (July 5, 1857c), "True Happiness—Fruits of Not Following Counsel—Popular Prejudice Against the Mormons—The Coming Army—Punishment of Evildoers", in Calkin, Asa (ed.), Journal of Discourses Delivered by President Brigham Young, His Two Counsellors, the Twelve Apostles, and Others, vol. 5, Liverpool: Asa Calkin, pp. 1–6.
- Young, Brigham (July 26, 1857d), "Nebuchadnezzar's Dream—Opposition of Men and Devils to the Latter-Day Kingdom—Governmental Breach of the Utah Mail Contract", in Calkin, Asa (ed.), Journal of Discourses Delivered by President Brigham Young, His Two Counsellors, the Twelve Apostles, and Others, vol. 5, Liverpool: Asa Calkin, pp. 72–78.
- Young, Brigham (July 30, 1875), "Deposition, People v. Lee", Deseret News, vol. 24, no. 27, Salt Lake City, p. 8.
- Young, Brigham (April 30, 1877), "Interview with Brigham Young", Deseret News, vol. 26, no. 16, pp. 242–243, archived from the original on September 2, 2012.
