= Aiken massacre =

1857 lynching of 5 travelers by Mormon attackers

- Location: 39°24′33″N 112°03′01″W; Nephi area of the Sevier River; Willow Creek, Mona; and Warm Creek Hot Springs area of Salt Lake City, Utah Territory, United States
- Date: November 25 and 28, 1857
- Target: Murdered: John Aiken (25), Thomas L. Aiken (27), John Achard (33), Andrew Jackson Jones, and Horace Bucklin; Escaped: John Chapman
- Attack type: False imprisonment then mass lynching
- Deaths: 5
- Perpetrators: Brigham Young, Porter Rockwell, Wild Bill Hickman, Jacob G. Bigler, Sylvanus Collett, John S. Lott, John R. Murdock, and George Dalton
- Motive: War hysteria about a possible invasion; Mormon teachings against outsiders during the Mormon Reformation period; Orders from Brigham Young

The Aiken massacre was an 1857 lynching in central Utah, United States, of five Californian travelers reportedly at the orders of top leaders in Mormonism's largest denomination, the Church of Jesus Christ of Latter-day Saints. The victims were apprehended on trumped up charges of spying, imprisoned, then murdered, though two escaped with injuries, but were killed two days later. This occurred two months after the Mountain Meadows Massacre and was part of the impetus for the Utah War (1857–1858).

In 1877 Porter Rockwell and Wild Bill Hickman were indicted for the massacre. In his confession, the now excommunicated Hickman stated that after Bucklin ("Buck") had escaped the murder attempt, territory governor and top church president Brigham Young ordered him to finish the job. According to historian John G. Turner it is likely Young was involved in the death of four of the party members, along with a trader Richard Yates a month before. The Aiken massacre's name comes from the brothers Thomas and John Aiken of the group who were killed.
