= War hysteria preceding the Mountain Meadows Massacre =

Public hysteria leading up to the Mountain Meadows Massacre

The Mountain Meadows Massacre was caused in part by events relating to the Utah War (May 1857 – July 1858), an armed confrontation in Utah Territory between the United States Army and Mormon pioneers. In the summer of 1857, however, Mormons experienced a wave of war hysteria, expecting an all-out invasion of apocalyptic significance. From July to September 1857, Mormon leaders prepared Mormons for a seven-year siege predicted by Brigham Young. Mormons were to stockpile grain, and were prevented from selling grain to emigrants for use as cattle feed. As far-off Mormon colonies retreated, Parowan and Cedar City became isolated and vulnerable outposts. Brigham Young sought to enlist the help of Indian tribes in fighting the "Americans", encouraging them to steal cattle from emigrant trains, and to join Mormons in fighting the approaching army.

In August 1857, Mormon apostle George A. Smith, of Parowan, set out on a tour of southern Utah, instructing Mormons to stockpile grain. Scholars have asserted that Smith's tour, speeches, and personal actions contributed to the fear and tension in these communities, and influenced the decision to attack and destroy the Baker–Fancher emigrant train near Mountain Meadows, Utah. He met with many of the eventual participants in the massacre, including William H. Dame, Isaac Haight, and John D. Lee. He noted that the militia was organized and ready to fight, and that some of them were anxious to "fight and take vengeance for the cruelties that had been inflicted upon us in the States". On his return trip to Salt Lake City, Smith camped near the Baker–Fancher party. Jacob Hamblin suggested the Fanchers stop and rest their cattle at Mountain Meadows. Some of Smith's party started rumors that the Fanchers had poisoned a well and a dead ox, in order to kill Indians, rumors that preceded the Fanchers to Cedar City.. Most witnesses said that the Fanchers were in general a peaceful party that behaved well along the trail.

Among Smith's party were a number of Paiute Indian chiefs from the Mountain Meadows area. When Smith returned to Salt Lake, Brigham Young met with these leaders on September 1, 1857, and encouraged them to fight against the "Americans". The Indian chiefs were reportedly reluctant. Some scholars theorize, however, that the leaders returned to Mountain Meadows and participated in the massacre. However, it is uncertain whether they would have had time to do so.

== Background ==
In early 1857, several groups of emigrants from the northwestern Arkansas region started their trek to California, joining up on the way and known as the Baker–Fancher party. This group was relatively wealthy, and planned to restock its supplies in Salt Lake City, as most wagon trains did at the time. The party reached Salt Lake City with about 120 members. In Salt Lake, there was an unsubstantiated rumor that the widow of the revered Mormon martyr Parley P. Pratt recognized one of the party as being present at her husband's murder.

For the decade prior to the Fanchers' arrival there, Utah Territory existed as a theocracy led by Brigham Young. As part of Young's vision of a pre-millennial "Kingdom of God", Young established colonies along the California and Old Spanish Trails, where Mormon officials governed by "lay[ing] the ax at the root of the tree of sin and iniquity". Two of the southernmost establishments were Parowan and Cedar City, led respectively by Stake Presidents William H. Dame and Isaac C. Haight. Haight and Dame were, in addition, the senior regional military leaders of the Mormon militia. During the period just before the massacre, known as the Mormon Reformation, Mormon teachings were dramatic and strident. The religion had undergone a period of intense persecution in the American midwest, and faithful Mormons made solemn oaths to pray for vengeance upon those who killed the "prophets" including founder Joseph Smith and most recently apostle Parley P. Pratt, who was murdered in April 1857 in Arkansas.

== Utah War ==
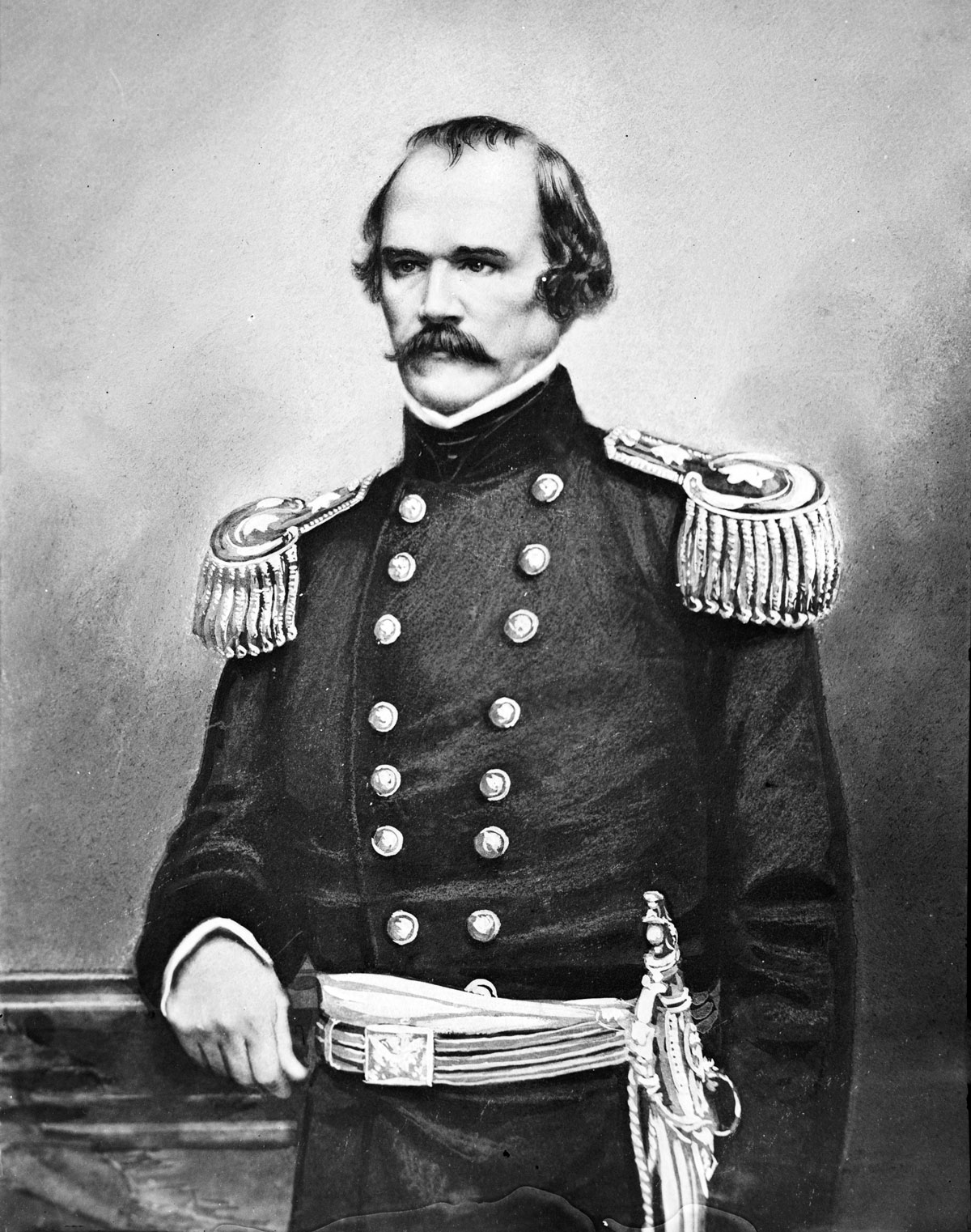
Albert S. Johnston General commanding U.S. expeditionary force sent to subdue "Mormon Rebellion"

In July 1857, while the Baker–Fancher party was en route to Utah Territory, Mormons began hearing rumors that the United States had launched an expedition to invade the territory and depose its theocratic government. For almost a decade, relations between Utah and the federal government had deteriorated over the issue of polygamy and the role of Mormon institutions versus that of federal ones in the territory. By July 1857, Young's replacement, Alfred Cumming, was appointed, and a fourth of the entire U.S. army, some 2,500 dragoons, were already on the march.

As news of the approaching army spread, the coming invasion took on apocalyptic significance. Mormons saw it as a threat to their existence. Members of the First Presidency framed the confrontation as a battle between the Kingdom of God and minions of the Devil. Some Mormons in southern Utah taught that the invasion was the beginning of the Millennium, and the prevailing understanding there was that the U.S. Army intended to wipe out the Mormons as a people. In preparation for a seven-year siege predicted by Brigham Young, Mormon leaders began accelerating an existing program for stockpiling grain. Mormons were told to sell their clothing to buy as much grain as possible, and not to use grain as animal feed nor sell it to emigrants for this purpose.

Defiant against the United States, Brigham Young warned "mobocrats", particularly past Mormon persecutors and the "priests, editors, and politicians who have howled so long about us", to stay away from the territory, or "we will attend to their cases". He stated that if such persons entered the territory, "they will find a 'Vigilance Committee'" and they will "find the Danites". But Young denounced plans by Mormons to rob "innocent" emigrant trains, saying that such robbers themselves would "be overtaken by a 'Vigilance Committee'". He wanted to ensure that "the good and honest may be able to pass from the Eastern States to California...in peace".

Young ordered pioneer settlements furthest afield to pull up stakes–evacuating colonies in San Bernardino (southern California), Las Vegas (southern Nevada), Carson Valley (western Nevada), and Fort Bridger (western Wyoming). Thereafter, the farthest remaining outpost of Mormonism were the outlying Mormon colonies at Cedar City (led by Stake President-Major Isaac C. Haight) and Parowan (led by Stake President-Colonel William H. Dame), two infant fortress-villages near Mountain Meadows where the massacre took place. These settlements were nearly 300 miles from the Salt Lake City headquarters, and only reachable by a three days' journey on horseback, the messengers changing mounts at various settlements along the way. Mormons in and around the Cedar City area were to be the first defense against an attack from the south which the Mormons feared and which the US Army was preparing for. The word from Mormon headquarters was that the approaching U.S. Army had orders to murder every believing Mormon, and that the troops were coming directly from Missouri,

On August 5, 1857, Brigham Young declared martial law. All borders were to be sealed to further travel through Utah by emigrants. Young also made it illegal to travel through Utah without a permit, but no safe conduct pass was made available to the Baker–Fancher train by Territorial or local officials. The party would not have been aware of Young's decree as it was only made public on September 15, 1857.

Emigrant trains arriving from the east presented an opportunity for Mormons to trade or sell foodstuffs and other supplies, and until the Utah War, most were friendly and willing to help travelers pass through the Utah Territory. The Baker–Fancher train encountered residents along the way who were obeying Young's recent order to stockpile supplies in expectations of all-out war with approaching U.S. troops. The Mormons were directed not to sell any food to the enemy, as the emigrant train was labeled.

== George A. Smith's circuit through southern Utah ==
On August 3, 1857, Mormon apostle George A. Smith left Salt Lake City to visit the southern Utah communities. He arrived at Parowan on August 8, 1857, and on August 15, 1857, he set off on a tour of Stake President-Colonel W. H. Dame's military district. During the tour, Smith gave military speeches and counseled Mormons that they prepare to "touch fire to their homes, and hide themselves in the mountains, and to defend their country to the very last extremity." Smith instructed Mormons to stockpile grain, and not to sell it to emigrants for animal feed. Scholars have asserted that Smith's tour, speeches, and personal actions contributed to the fear and tension in these communities, and influenced the decision to attack and destroy the Baker–Fancher emigrant train near Mountain Meadows, Utah. John D. Lee accompanied Smith on part of this tour, during which Smith addressed a group of Native Americans in Santa Clara, counseling them that "the Americans" were approaching with a large army, and were a threat to the Native Americans as well as the Mormons. Riding in a wagon afterwards, Lee said he warned Smith that the Native Americans would likely attack emigrant trains, and that Mormons were anxious to avenge the blood of the prophets, and according to Lee, Smith seemed pleased, and said "he had had a long talk with Major Haight on the same subject".

Major Isaac C. Haight, the stake president of Cedar City, met with Smith again on August 21. Haight told Smith he had heard reports that 600 troops were already approaching Cedar City from the East, and that if the rumors were true, Haight would have to act without waiting for instructions from Salt Lake City. Smith agreed, and "admired his grit". Smith later said he was uncomfortable, perhaps "on account of my extreme timidity", because some of the militia members were eager that "their enemies might come and give them a chance to fight and take vengeance for the cruelties that had been inflicted upon us in the States", such as the Haun's Mill massacre.

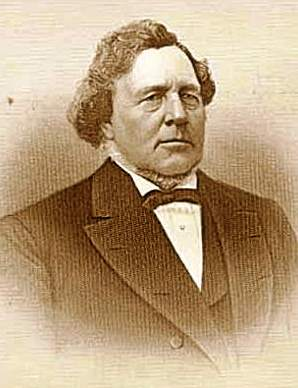
George A. Smith,
LDS Church Apostle

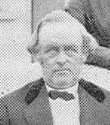
William H. Dame,
Stake President of Parowan, and commander of the Iron County Militia

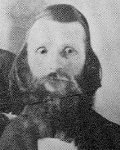
Isaac C. Haight,
Stake President of Cedar City, and second in command under Dame.

On his return to Salt Lake City, Smith was accompanied by a party including Jacob Hamblin of Santa Clara, a newly appointed Mormon missionary to the Natives in the region who also ran a federally funded Indian farm near Mountain Meadows.

Also traveling north with the Smith party were several Native chiefs from southern Utah Territory On August 25, 1857, Smith's group camped next to the Baker–Fancher party, headed the opposite direction, at Corn Creek (now Kanosh). Smith later said he had no knowledge of the Baker–Fancher party prior to meeting them on the trail. When the Baker–Fancher party inquired about places to stop for water and grazing, Jacob Hamblin directed them to Mountain Meadows, near his home and, the Indian farm, a regular stopover on the Old Spanish Trail.

Some members of Smith's party later testified that during their encampment they saw the Baker–Fancher party poison a spring and a dead ox, with the expectation that Native Americans would be poisoned. Silas S. Smith, the cousin of George A., testified that the Baker–Fancher party suspiciously asked whether the Native Americans would eat a dead ox. Although the poisoning story supported the Mormon theory that Native Americans had been poisoned and therefore conducted a massacre on their own, modern historians generally discount the testimony and rumors about the poisoned ox and spring as false. Nevertheless, the poisoning story preceded the Fanchers on their trip southward.

== Interactions on road toward Mountain Meadows ==
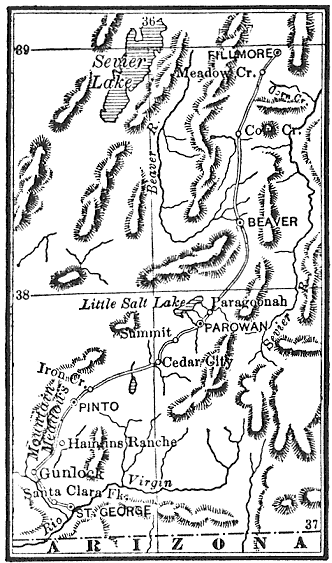
Map of the California trail in southern Utah at the time of the massacre

The Mormons considered the emigrants of an alien status because of Young's orders forbidding travel through Utah without a required pass – which the Baker–Fancher party did not have. However, Captains Baker and Fancher may not have been aware of Young's martial law order since it was not made public until September 15, 1857.

The Fancher and Dukes parties (respectively from Arkansas and Missouri) having assisted each other on their western journeys, it was believed by some locals that the Fancher party was joined by eleven members of a Missouri militia calling itself the "Wildcats". (Yet there is debate on whether these miners and plainsmen stayed with the slow-moving Baker–Fancher party after leaving Salt Lake City, or actually existed.)

Meanwhile, the Mormons that the Baker–Fancher train encountered along the way were obeying Young's order to stockpile supplies in expectations of all-out war with approaching U.S. troops and declined to trade with the Fanchers. This friction was added to by the "range war" that would be expected to erupt between local populations and any emigrants' leading vast herds of cattle – and indeed, both the Fancher and Dukes parties' stock would compete with locals' for grazing and sometimes would break through the Mormon colonists' fences. With the murder and the expulsion of U.S. Government surveyors, there was no demarcation of the territorial lands claimed by Native Americans, Mormons, and those that the Americans purchased from Mexico (Treaty of Guadalupe Hidalgo). Yet in the war panic, such mundane complaints escalated into more ominous charges.

For example, according to John D. Lee, "They swore and boasted openly... that Buchanan's whole army was coming right behind them, and would kill every God Damn Mormon in Utah.... They had two bulls which they called one "Heber" and the other "Brigham", and whipped 'em through every town, yelling and singing... and blaspheming oaths that would have made your hair stand on end."

While Jacob Hamblin was in Salt Lake City he heard that the Fanchers had "behaved badly [...and had] robbed hen-roosts, and been guilty of other irregularities, and had used abusive language to those who had remonstrated with them. It was also reported that they threatened, when the army came into the north end of the Territory, to get a good outfit from the weaker settlements in the south."

John Hawley traveling to his home in Washington, U.T., overtook the Fancher Party 150 miles South of Provo and traveled with them 3 days. Hawley found them to be men of families and a large drove of cattle all going to locate in California. The captain told him they had trouble with the Mormons at Salt Creek and Provo when their cattle crossed into the Mormon's herd ground and a Dutchman in their party would not obey the authorities. The captain told him that they intended to obey all the laws and rules of the territory. Hawley went on to say "I am satisfied the Saints gave them more trouble than they ought".

In his report of his investigation of the massacre, Superintendent for Indian Affairs in Utah Territory, Jacob Forney said: "I [...made] strict inquiry relative to the general behavior and conduct of the company towards the people of this territory ..., and am justified in saying that they conducted themselves with propriety."

In Forney's interview with David Tullis who had been living with Jacob Hamblin, Tullis related that "[t]he company passed by the house...towards evening.... One of the men rode up to where I was working, and asked if there was water ahead. I said, yes. The person who rode up behaved civilly."

In addition, William Rogers later related where Shirts related he "saw the emigrants when they entered the valley, and talked with several of the men belonging to it. They appeared perfectly civil and gentlemanly."

== Brigham Young's attempt to enlist Native Americans to fight "the Americans" ==
Brigham Young, as Superintendent of Indian Affairs in the Utah Territory, built strong diplomatic ties with the area's Native American tribes. When it became clear there would be an invasion by U.S. troops, he sought to enlist them to join Mormons in fighting the "Americans".

On August 4, 1857, Young notified Jacob Hamblin that he was appointed President of the Santa Clara Indian Mission and instructed him to continue a conciliatory policy towards the Indians. "..they must learn that they either got to help us, or the United States will kill us both".

Young sent his trusted interpreter Dimick B. Huntington to various tribes with wagon loads of food. Huntington told Native Americans that the Utah War was a battle, prophesied in the Book of Mormon, between Mormons and Native Americans, on the one hand, and "gentiles" (non-Mormon whites) on the other. Young's message for the tribes was that they should "be at peace with all men except the Americans". Scholars disagree whether Young intended the Native American tribes to fight all non-Mormon Americans, including emigrants, or just the approaching U.S. Army.

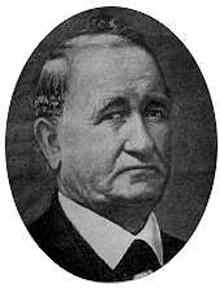
Dimick B. Huntington
Native American interpreter, colonist of Provo, Utah

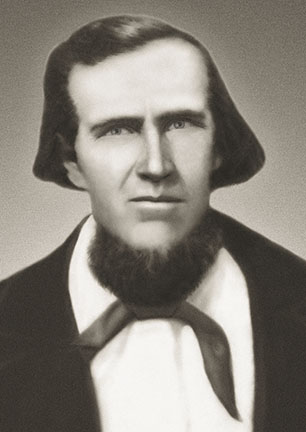
Jacob Hamblin
President of Latter-day Saints' mission to Indians

No disapproval was expressed by Huntington when told by Shoshones that cows, horses, and mules had been stolen from Californians. Wilford Woodruff recorded Young's message to the Mormon apostles on August 26, 1857, "The Gentile emigrants [will] shoot the indians wharever they meet with them & the Indians now retaliate & will kill innocent People.", On August 30, 1857, Huntington gave a group of northern tribes "all the beef cattle & horses that was on the road to Cal[i]fornia, the North rout[e]".

On September 1, 1857, frontiersman James Gemmell was in Young's office with Hamblin, who had accompanied the group of tribal leaders (including Ammon, Kanosh, Tutsegabit, and Youngwuds), and George A. Smith on his return to Salt Lake, all of whom had camped near the Baker–Fancher party.

When Hamblin told Young that the Arkansas train was near Cedar City, Young said, according to Gemmell (whose statement derives from an 1896 posthumous source named Wheeler), that if he were in charge of the Nauvoo Legion he "would wipe them out." These chiefs then met with Huntington and Brigham Young, where the Native American leaders were given "all the cattle that had gone to Cal. the south rout[e]." The Native American leaders questioned this, because previously, the Mormons had told them not to steal cattle. Young acknowledged this, but said, "now they have come to fight us & you, for when they kill us then they will kill you." Modern scholars generally agree that Brigham Young was authorizing Native American leaders to steal emigrant cattle. And there is evidence that a policy that Native Americans should steal emigrants' cattle was put into effect against emigrant groups other than the Fancher–Baker party.
