= Hannah Maria Libby Smith House =

Historic house in Utah, United States

- U.S. National Register of Historic Places
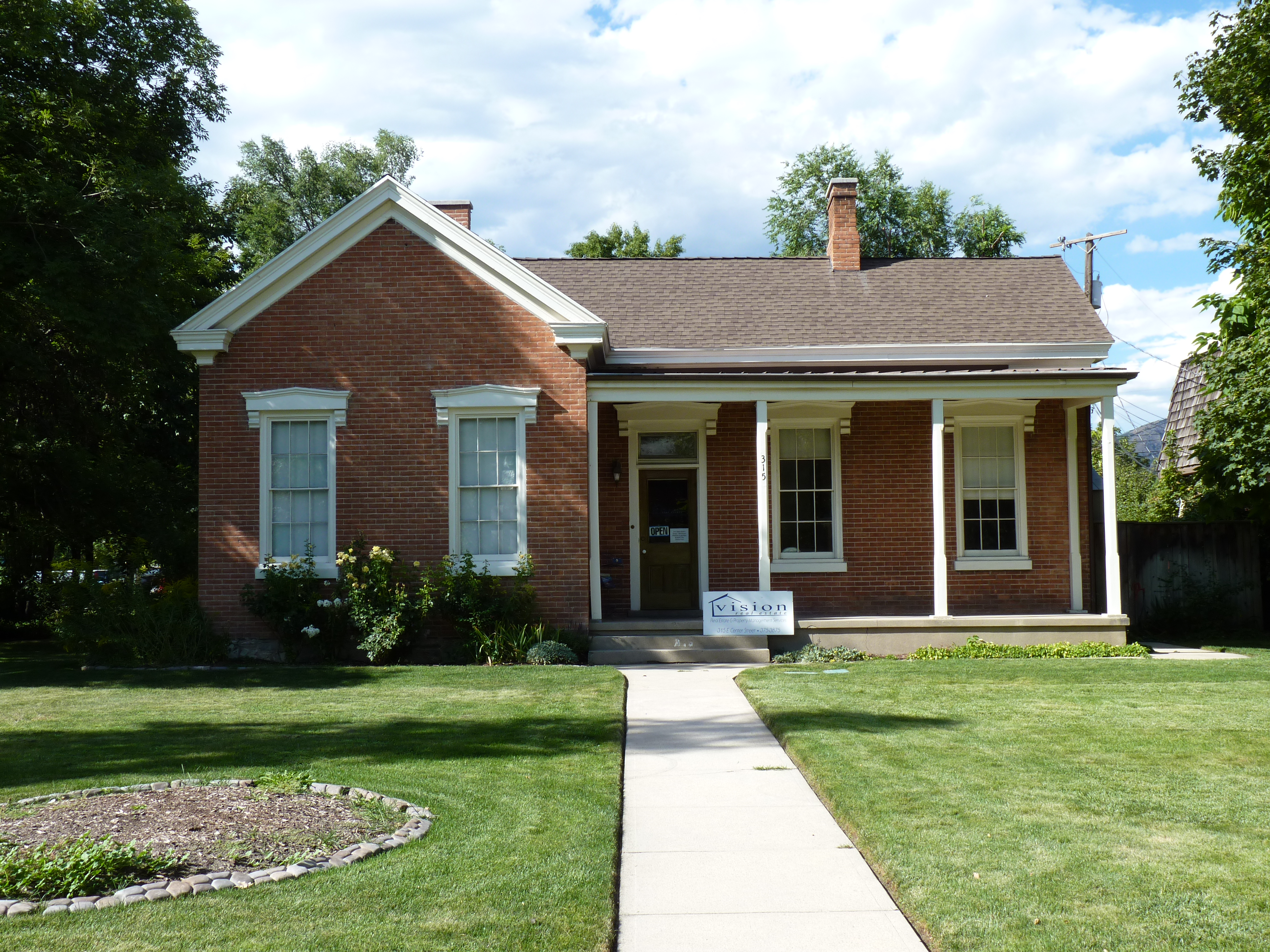
- Hannah Maria Libby Smith House House

- Location within Utah Location within the United States
- Location: 315 East Center Street; Provo, Utah
- Coordinates: 40°14′2″N 111°39′7″W
- Area: less than one acre
- Built: 1878
- Built by: Charles Warren Smith
- NRHP reference No.: 80003981
- Added to NRHP: February 14, 1980

The Hannah Maria Libby Smith House, also known as the Arnel Milner Home, is a historic house located in Provo, Utah, United States. It is listed on the National Register of Historic Places.

== Hannah Maria Libby Smith House ==
Built in 1878, this home is one of the best preserved vernacular residences in Provo. Hannah Maria Libby Smith was the wife of George A. Smith, an apostle of the Church of Jesus Christ of Latter-day Saints. Their son, Charles Warren Smith, built the home during a three-year period. Hannah lived there the rest of her life, raised five children and her nephew, John Henry Smith, from the time he was two, because his mother, Hannah's sister Sarah Ann Libby, had died of tuberculosis about 1849. His son, President George Albert Smith, later became a president of the LDS Church. The Hannah Maria Libby Smith House was designated to the Provo City Historic Landmarks Register on March 21, 1996, and to the National Register of Historic Places in Utah County, Utah on February 14, 1980. It has been passed down through the family.

=== Structure ===
A one-story orange brick home, the Hannah Smith house is built on a rubble rock foundation. The home includes gabled roofs, double hung windows, original glass and woodwork, and wood siding for the dining room, kitchen and bathroom areas. The most unusual decor is the Federal-style lintel with brackets topping all of the windows, which are unusually large six-on-six windows.

The home is still primarily original with many authentic features highlighted in a 2006 restoration. The original four rooms of brick were augmented by two more in wood which connected with the Granary building at the back of the house by 1890. The raised granary has a back door extant which was used for deliveries, but is too far off the ground to have been used for over 75 years. Before the harvest, the area was used as a summer kitchen. Although the back porch is a replacement of its predecessor, the front porch is original with the house. The two fireplaces served rooms on both front and back with brick made in Utah and one has been restored to the original oak-veining. The parlor shared a fireplace with a bedroom; the central living area adjoined Hannah's bedroom.

The twelve-foot high cove ceilings are original, with one chandelier dating to the 1920s. The floors are also original, and were sanded, patched and refinished during the restoration. The panel above the built-in china cupboard in the living room was concealed until it was discovered and restored in 2006.

=== Hannah Maria Libby Smith ===
Hannah Maria Libby was born June 29, 1828, in Ossipee, Grafton, New Hampshire. She and her sister, Sarah Ann Libby (who was ten years older) both married George Albert Smith, an apostle serving in the Church of Jesus Christ of Latter Day Saints, Sarah on 20 November 1845, Hannah on 26 January 1846 in the city of Nauvoo, Illinois. At the time she was his sixth wife, her sister his fifth.

Leaving her home in Illinois with her husband in 1846 to migrate to Utah, she and many other families waited at Winter Quarters, Iowa, while her husband made the rest of the journey before returning for her in 1847 to transport them there. She traveled with her sister and fellow wife, Lucy Merserve Smith in the George A. Smith/Dan Jones Company that left Kanesville on June 22, 1849, and arrived in Salt Lake City on October 27, 1849. Her sister was sick with tuberculosis in Winter Quarters and traveled in the wagon while Hannah herded cattle and cooked and took care of children. Once in Salt Lake, they shared a room until a home could be built. Sarah died 12 June 1851 when her only child was two, and Hannah raised him as her own.

In 1852, George A. Smith was called to settle the southern area of Utah, and took Hannah and Lucy to Utah Valley and settled them in what was to become the city of Provo. Lucy's two children had died very young, but she and Hannah were a good team. The carpet that they wove for the Provo Tabernacle was so uniform that no one could tell where one's work left off and the other began. When their husband became ill, Lucy moved back to Salt Lake City to take care of him. He died 1 September 1875.

Hannah's oldest child, Charles Warren Smith, was born 16 January 1849 in Carbunca/Kanesville, Pottawatamie, Iowa, four months after his half-brother, John Henry. Sarah Maria was born 1 January 1856 in Provo during a very hard winter. Her sister, Eunice Albertine was born four years later, 6 March 1860 in Provo, but died 4 October 1861 in the fall of the next year. George Albert Smith, the second of that name was born 7 April 1862 in Provo, but also died young on 28 October 1863. Hannah had Grace Libby Smith on 14 May 1865, four years after the Provo Tabernacle was completed.

"The Smith wives, though often geographically scattered, cooperated economically, those in outlying settlements sometimes sending handwoven fabric to wives in Salt Lake City who sent back dyed cloth or sewn clothing. Many plural wives were economically independent or interdependent because of their husbands’ intensive involvement in missionary and colonization efforts"

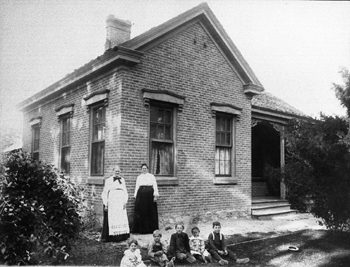
Hannah and house with Grace and grandchildren

== History of the home and the women of 315 East Center ==
After the death of George A. Smith in 1875, Hannah sold her previous home on 2nd North 5th West to finance the house while it was being built. She lived here until she died in 1906. Her youngest daughter, Grace Libby Smith, married Joseph Edwin Cheever (born 26 February 1865) on 12 June 1889 in Manti, Sanpete County, Utah and they moved in with Hannah. The picture is of Hannah and Grace & Joseph Cheever and some of Hannah's 26 grandchildren in front of her house at 3rd East and Center. Grace Libby stayed in the home until she died in 1939. Of her eight children, two—Grace Smith Cheever, born 8 August 1901 and Tirzah Libby Cheever, born 7 October 1903, lived in the house from their births until their deaths.

Grace cared for her ailing mother and father and her younger sister, Tirzah who was handicapped and used a wheelchair. She was an extraordinary woman who personified the word "grace" itself during her many years of service. She worked as an executive secretary at Ironton Steel and was active in women's business organizations. She served in many positions with the Young Women's organization of the LDS Church, as well as served on the Young women's General Board for many years. She helped organize and build a large lodge behind Mount Timpanogos (near Sundance) that was a young women's camp for decades until acquired by BYU. On 22 September 1951 she married Arnel Seaton Milner, born 9 January 1896. They kept house until she died in there in 1974, and Arnel Milner passed it on to daughter Beth Milner Raynes when he died on 19 October 1987. Arnel Milner made arrangements to sell it once to the Utah County Heritage Foundation as a place for women to "meet in small groups, talk, read, write, study and create." The home still possessed its original interior and furnishings, including furniture that had come across the plains. The funding didn't come through, and Beth and her husband, Lincoln Raynes lived in it for a number of years, as well as rented it to students and families.

Their daughter, Marybeth received the house from her parents in 2003. Because of her close connection with her grandmother, as well as living in the house several times as a young person, she decided to restore the house, keeping in mind historical accuracy. After three years, she held an Open House upon its completion. She continues to provide access for the Provo Tour of Historic Homes. Utah Valley Visitor's Bureau publishes a self-guided booklet called "Historic Provo" yearly.

The house today is focused on women and their crafts today as it was 135 years ago. Harmony Provo offers classes as well as the materials for women's home industries. Hannah's House continues to be a valuable historical link in the city of Provo today.
