= Jedediah M. Grant =

American Mormon leader (1816–1856)

Second Counselor in the First Presidency
- April 7, 1854 – December 1, 1856
- Called by: Brigham Young
- Predecessor: Willard Richards
- Successor: Daniel H. Wells

LDS Church Apostle
- April 7, 1854 – December 1, 1856
- Called by: Brigham Young
- Reason: Death of Willard Richards
- Reorganization at end of term: Daniel H. Wells ordained and added to the First Presidency

First Seven Presidents of the Seventy
- December 2, 1845 – April 7, 1854
- Called by: Brigham Young
- End reason: Called as Second Counselor in the First Presidency

Personal details
- Born: Jedediah Morgan Grant; February 21, 1816; Windsor, New York, United States
- Died: December 1, 1856 (aged 40); Salt Lake City, Utah Territory, United States
- Resting place: Salt Lake City Cemetery; 40.777°N 111.858°W
- Spouse(s): 7
- Children: 11
- Parents: Joshua and Athalia H. Grant
- Signature

Jedediah Morgan Grant (February 21, 1816 – December 1, 1856) was a leader and an apostle of the Church of Jesus Christ of Latter-day Saints (LDS Church). He was member of the First Council of the Seventy from 1845 to 1854 and served in the First Presidency under church president Brigham Young from 1854 to 1856. He is known for his fiery speeches during the Reformation of 1856, earning the nickname "Brigham's Sledgehammer". Grant is the father of Heber J. Grant, who later served as President of the Church.

== Early life ==
Jedediah M. Grant was born February 21, 1816, to Joshua Grant and Athalia Howard in Windsor, New York. He was baptized into the Church of Christ by John F. Boynton on March 21, 1833, at age 17. By age 18, he had participated in Zion's Camp, marching from Kirtland, Ohio, to Missouri under the direction of Joseph Smith. Though the physical objectives of the march were not met, many members later became leaders in Smith's church. Grant's close relationship with these men from such an early age would last the rest of his life.

Grant was among the first Latter Day Saint missionaries to go to Maryland, North Carolina, and Virginia. His preaching efforts in the Toms River area of New Jersey in the late 1830s led to the conversion of members of the Ivins family.

Grant was one of a group of men (which also included Brigham Young, Wilford Woodruff and George A. Smith) who were called in 1844 to campaign for Smith's election to President of the United States.

== Church leader ==
After Smith's death, Grant was called to serve as a President of the Seventy. As a Seventy, he assisted with the trek westwards and the settling of the Salt Lake Valley. He would later become the first mayor of Salt Lake City, Utah, serving in that position from 1851 until his death. Morgan County, Utah, and Morgan, Utah, are both named for him. In 1854, Grant was ordained an apostle, but he did not become a member of the Quorum of the Twelve Apostles. Instead, he was called to the First Presidency as Young's Second Counselor, filling the vacancy left by the death of Willard Richards.

Grant served in the Utah Territorial Council in 1851.

== Sermons during the Mormon reformation ==
In 1856, Grant was called by Young to tour the northern sections of Utah Territory, calling the Latter-day Saints to repentance. Grant inspired the Mormon Reformation of 1856 as he delivered fiery speeches on this tour. He issued a call for rebaptism of all the members of the area. Grant's speeches earned him the title "Brigham's Sledgehammer". The effects of his speeches were felt almost immediately; members throughout the area, as well as in distant parts, were rebaptized to signify their commitment to renew their commitments to the LDS Church and the gospel.

== Death and descendants ==
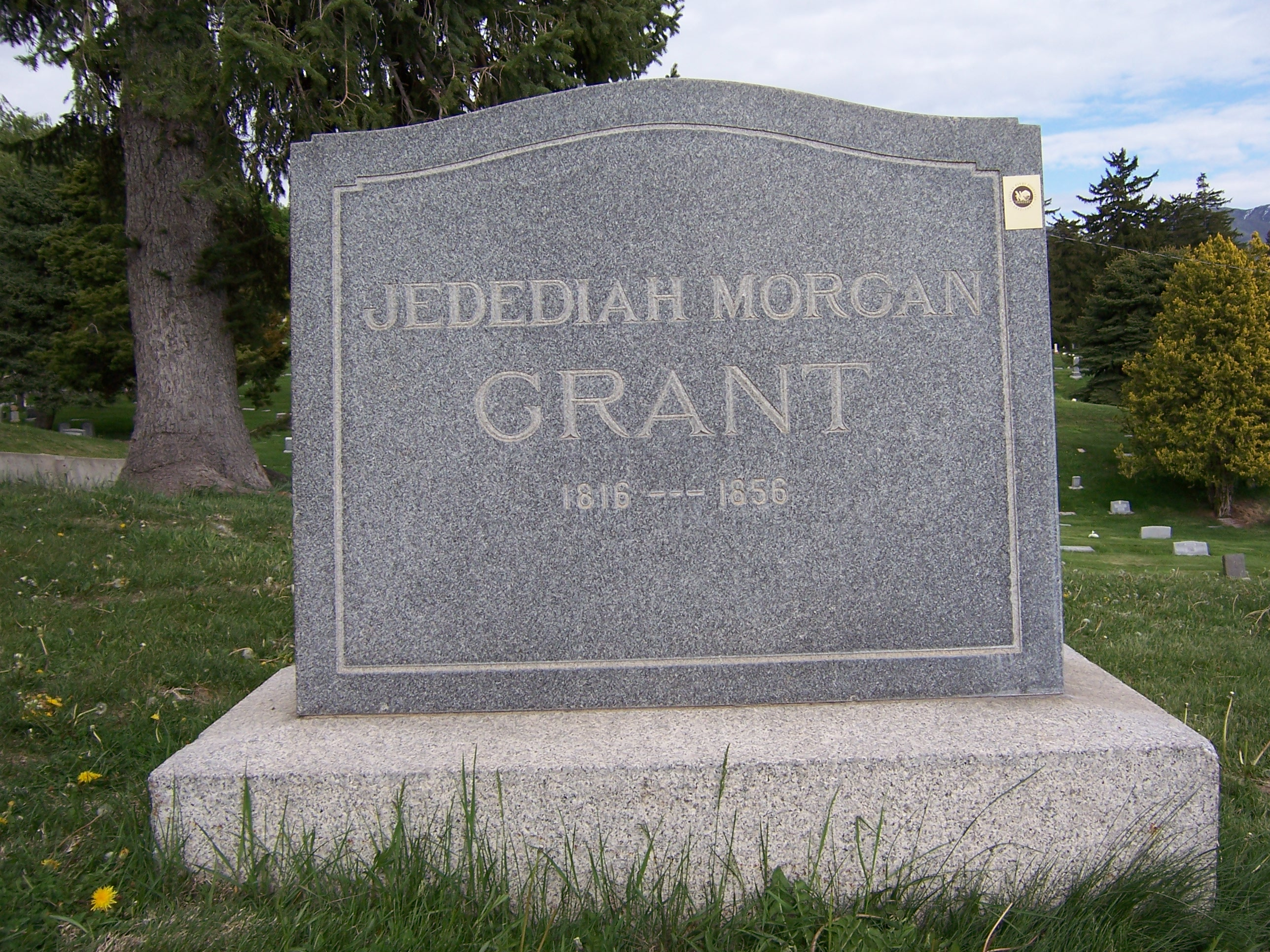
Grave marker of Jedediah M. Grant

Grant contracted pneumonia after his vigorous tour. He died on December 1, 1856, just nine days after his son, Heber J. Grant, was born to his wife Rachel Ridgeway Ivins. He was buried at Salt Lake City Cemetery.

Like many early Mormons, Grant practiced plural marriage, a form of polygyny. He had a total of seven wives, among them Susan Fairchild Noble Grant, who wrote reminiscences of early life in Utah and was a leader in the Relief Society after Grant died. By his wives, Grant had 11 children (10 biological, one adopted). His son, Heber, became the LDS Church's seventh president.

== See also ==
- List of mayors of Salt Lake City

== Notes ==
Political offices
New office	Mayor of Salt Lake City; 1851–1856	Succeeded by Abraham O. Smoot
The Church of Jesus Christ of Latter-day Saints titles
Preceded by Willard Richards	Second Counselor in the First Presidency; April 7, 1854 – December 1, 1856	Succeeded by Daniel H. Wells
