= American Massacre =

2003 book by Sally Denton

American Massacre: The Tragedy at Mountain Meadows, September 1857
- Author: Sally Denton
- Language: English
- Subject: Mountain Meadows massacre
- Genre: Non-fiction
- Publisher: Knopf (Hardcover); Vintage (Paperback)
- Publication date: June 17, 2003 (Hardcover); September 14, 2004 (Paperback)
- Publication place: United States
- Media type: Print (Hardcover) & (Paperback)
- Pages: 336
- ISBN: 0-375-41208-5

American Massacre: The Tragedy At Mountain Meadows, September 1857 is a non-fiction historical book by investigative reporter and author Sally Denton, released by Alfred A. Knopf in 2003.

== Synopsis ==
The book is the historical account of members of a California-bound wagon train and the plundering of their possessions in Southern Utah Territory and the Mountain Meadows massacre of 140.

== Critical reception ==
The New York Times described the book as, "A gripping account of the ambush in southern Utah that claimed the lives of some 140 members of a California-bound wagon train, and of the evidence pointing to its probable perpetrators.

Publishers Weekly, in its June 2003 review, wrote, "At times, she overreaches her sources, asserting as fact what is not attested to in the historical record, e.g., that Brigham Young struck a deal with a prosecuting attorney to fix the conviction of John D. Lee, the only attacker convicted of murder. She also wrongly claims that Brigham Young became fatally ill six months to the day after Lee's execution (it was five months later) in order to make Young's death fit a prophetic legend." Still, the review noted, "Although not as nuanced a historian as Brooks or Bagley, Denton is a marvelous writer who keeps this work of popular history as fresh and engaging as any novel.

== Awards ==
2003 New York Times Nonfiction Notable Book

2004 Western Heritage Award Literary Winner for Outstanding Nonfiction Book
