= Mountain Meadows Massacre =

1857 massacre of California-bound immigrants by Nauvoo Legion militiamen

- Part of the Utah War
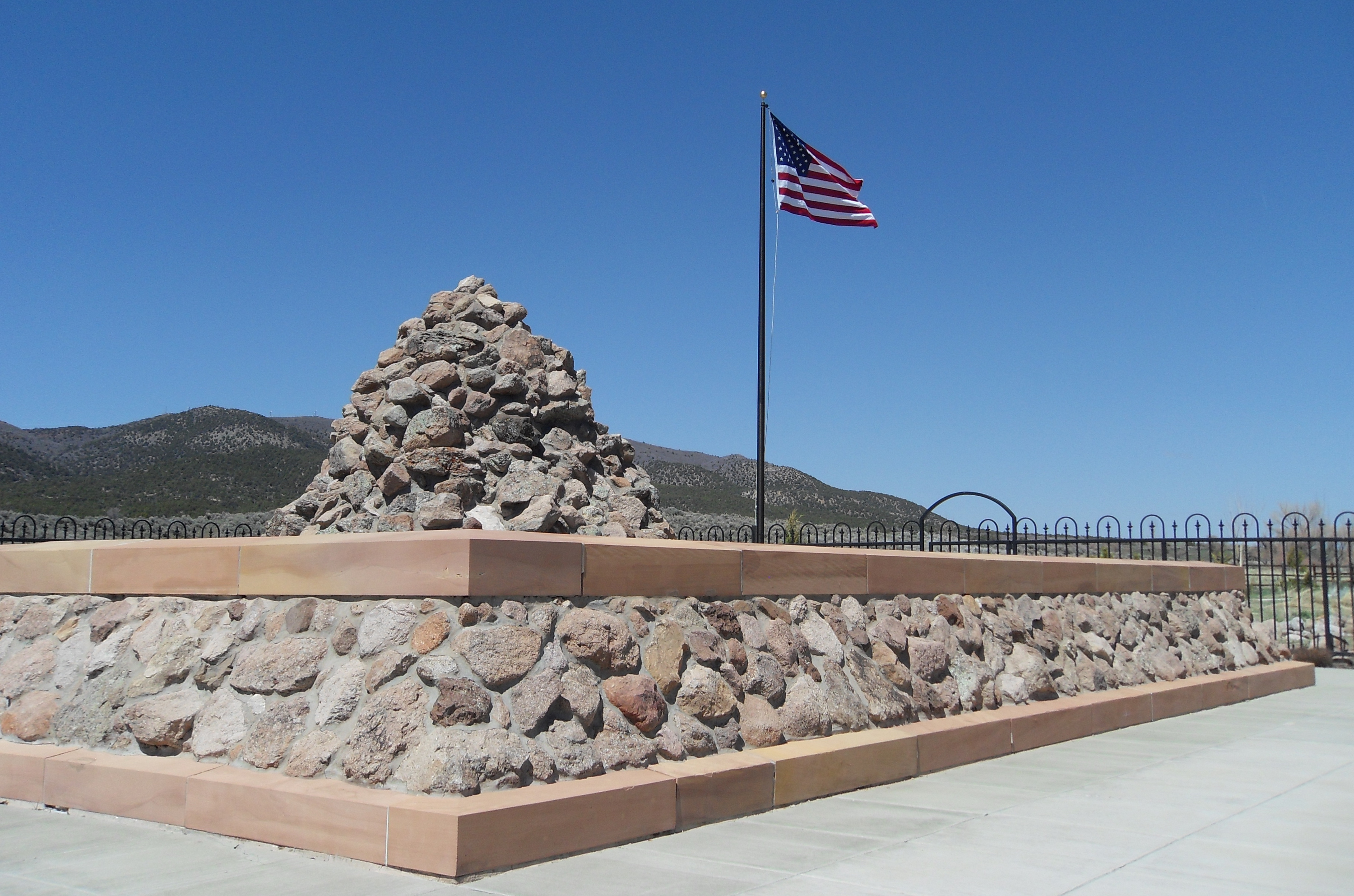
- The 1999 burial site monument

- Mountain Meadows Massacre (Utah)
- Location: 37°28′32″N 113°38′37″W; Mountain Meadows, Utah Territory, US
- Date: September 7–11, 1857
- Target: Members of the Baker–Fancher wagon train
- Attack type: Massacre
- Weapons: Guns, Bowie knives
- Deaths: 120–140 members of the Baker–Fancher wagon train (Note: The exact number of people who were in the wagon party is estimated by authors and historians to range from 120 to around 140. Bagley states that 70 people in the group were women and children known by name and that at least two-thirds of the wagon train consisted of women and children. The size of the party ebbed and flowed depending on where it was in its journey west so the exact number of people in the wagon train at any given time and the exact number of people who were killed remains unknown (though Briggs states that 120 people were killed). The number of children who survived is seventeen according to several sources. Those children (all ages six and under) were deemed too young by the attackers to remember the circumstances of their families' deaths.)
- Perpetrators: Nauvoo Legion (Utah Territorial Militia, Iron County district); Paiute Native American auxiliaries
- Motive: War hysteria about a possible invasion; Mormon teachings against outsiders during the Mormon Reformation period; Possible instigation from Brigham Young and other senior Mormon leadership
- Convicted: John D. Lee, leader in the local Mormon community and of the local militia

The Mountain Meadows Massacre (September 7–11, 1857) was a series of attacks during the Utah War that resulted in the mass murder of at least 120 members of the Baker–Fancher wagon train. The massacre occurred in the southern Utah Territory at Mountain Meadows, and was perpetrated by settlers from the Church of Jesus Christ of Latter-day Saints (LDS Church) involved with the Utah Territorial Militia (officially called the Nauvoo Legion) who recruited and were aided by some Southern Paiute Native Americans. The wagon train, made up mostly of immigrant families from Arkansas, was bound for California, traveling on the Old Spanish Trail that passed through the Territory.

After arriving in Salt Lake City, the Baker–Fancher party made their way south along the Mormon Road, eventually stopping to rest at Mountain Meadows. The party's journey occurred amidst hostilities between Mormon settlers and the US government, with war hysteria rampant amongst the Mormons. Acting on rumors of hostile behavior on the part of the travelers, local Mormon militia leaders, including Isaac C. Haight and John D. Lee, made plans to attack them as they camped at the meadow. The leaders of the militia, wanting to give the impression of tribal hostilities, persuaded Southern Paiutes to join with a larger party of militiamen disguised as Native Americans in an attack on the wagon train.

During the militia's first assault, the travelers fought back, and a five-day siege ensued. Eventually, fear spread among the militia's leaders that some immigrants had caught sight of the white men, likely discerning the actual identity of a majority of the attackers. As a result, militia commander William H. Dame ordered his forces to kill the travelers. By this time, the travelers were running low on water and provisions, and allowed some members of the militia – who approached under a white flag – to enter their camp. The militia members assured the immigrants they were protected, and after handing over their weapons, the immigrants were escorted away from their defensive position. After walking a distance from the camp, the militiamen, with the help of auxiliary forces hiding nearby, attacked the travelers. The perpetrators killed all the adults and older children in the group, in the end sparing only seventeen young children ages six and under.

Following the massacre, the perpetrators buried some of the remains but ultimately left most of the bodies exposed to wild animals and the climate. Local families took in the surviving children, with many of the victims' possessions and remaining livestock being auctioned off. Investigations, which were interrupted by the American Civil War, resulted in nine indictments in 1874. Of the men who were indicted, only Lee was tried in a court of law. After two trials in the Utah Territory, Lee was convicted by a jury, sentenced to death and executed by firing squad on March 23, 1877.

Historians attribute the massacre to a combination of factors, including war hysteria about a possible invasion of Mormon territory and Mormon teachings against outsiders during the Mormon Reformation. Scholars debate whether senior leadership in the LDS Church, including Brigham Young, directly instigated the massacre or if responsibility for it lay only with the leaders of the militia.

== History ==
=== Baker–Fancher party ===
In early 1857, the Baker–Fancher party was formed from several groups mainly from Marion, Crawford, Carroll and Johnson counties in northwestern Arkansas. They assembled into a wagon train at Beller's Stand, south of Harrison, to emigrate to southern California. The group was initially referred to as both the Baker train and the Perkins train, but later referred to as the Baker–Fancher train (or party). It was named after "Colonel" Alexander Fancher who, having already made the journey to California twice before, had become its main leader. By contemporary standards the Baker–Fancher party was prosperous, carefully organized and well-equipped for the journey. They were joined along the way by families and individuals from other states, including Missouri. The group was relatively wealthy, and planned to restock its supplies in Salt Lake City, as did most wagon trains at the time.

=== Interactions with Mormon settlers ===
At the time of the Fanchers' arrival, the Utah Territory, though legally a democracy, was effectively a theocracy under the leadership of Brigham Young, the second president of the Church of Jesus Christ of Latter-day Saints (LDS Church), who had established colonies along the California Trail and the Old Spanish Trail. US President James Buchanan had recently issued an order to send federal troops to Utah, which led to rumors being spread in the territory about its motives. Young issued various orders that urged the local population to prepare for the arrival of the troops. Eventually Young issued a declaration of martial law.

The Baker–Fancher party was refused provisions in Salt Lake City and chose to leave there and take the Old Spanish Trail, which passed through southern Utah. In August 1857, the Mormon apostle George A. Smith traveled throughout the southern part of the territory instructing Mormon settlers to stockpile grain. While on his return trip to Salt Lake City, Smith camped near the Baker–Fancher party on August 25, 1857, at Corn Creek. They had traveled the 165 miles (266 km) south from Salt Lake City, and Jacob Hamblin suggested that the wagon train continue on the trail and rest their cattle at Mountain Meadows, which had good pasture and was adjacent to his homestead.

While most witnesses said that the Fanchers were in general a peaceful party whose members behaved well along the trail, rumors spread about their supposed misdeeds. United States Army Brevet Major James Henry Carleton led the first federal investigation of the murders, and the findings were published in 1859. He recorded Hamblin's account that the train was alleged to have poisoned a spring near Corn Creek, resulting in the deaths of eighteen cows and two or three people who ate the contaminated meat. Carleton interviewed the father of a child who allegedly died from this poisoned spring and accepted the sincerity of the grieving father. He also included a statement from an investigator who did not believe the Fancher party was capable of poisoning the spring, given its size. Carleton invited readers to consider a potential explanation for the rumors of misdeeds, noting the general atmosphere of distrust among Mormons for strangers at the time, and that some locals appeared jealous of the Fancher party's wealth. Modern historians, noting the symptoms of the young boy who died, as well as very similar symptoms in someone in the Fancher party who died before reaching Utah, and the difficulty for a party the size of the Fancher train to poison a spring, now theorize that the deaths were caused by anthrax, which was a widespread but unrecognized disease in cattle at that time.

=== Conspiracy and siege ===
The Baker–Fancher party left Corn Creek and continued the 125 miles (201 km) to Mountain Meadows, passing Parowan and Cedar City, southern Utah communities led respectively by Stake Presidents William H. Dame and Isaac C. Haight. Haight and Dame were, in addition, the senior regional military leaders of the Iron Military District of the Nauvoo Legion. Over half the employees of the Iron County iron manufacturing plant were in that militia district.

As the party approached, several meetings were held in Cedar City and nearby Parowan by local LDS Church leaders pondering how to implement Young's declaration of martial law. On the afternoon of Sunday, September 6, Haight held his weekly Stake High Council meeting after church services and brought up the issue of what to do with the immigrants. The plan for a Native American massacre was discussed, but not all the Council members agreed it was the right approach. The Council resolved to take no action until Haight sent a rider, James Haslam, out the next day to carry an express to Salt Lake City (a six-day round trip on horseback) for Young's advice, as Utah did not yet have a telegraph system. Following the council, Haight decided to send a messenger Joseph Clewes south to John D. Lee. What Haight told Lee remains a mystery, but considering the timing it may have had something to do with Council's decision to wait for advice from Young.

The dispirited Baker–Fancher party found water and fresh grazing for its livestock after reaching grassy, mountain-ringed Mountain Meadows, a widely known stopover on the old Spanish Trail, in early September. They anticipated several days of rest and recuperation there before the next 40 miles (64 km) would take them out of Utah. On September 7, the party was attacked by Nauvoo Legion militiamen dressed as Native Americans and some Native American Paiutes. The Baker–Fancher party defended itself by encircling and lowering their wagons, wheels chained together, along with digging shallow trenches and throwing dirt both below and into the wagons, which made a strong barrier. Seven immigrants were killed during the opening attack and buried somewhere within the wagon encirclement. Sixteen more were wounded. The attack continued for five days, during which the besieged families had little or no access to fresh water or game food and their ammunition was depleted. Organization among the local Mormon leadership reportedly broke down. Fear spread among the militia's leaders that some emigrants had caught sight of white men, and had probably discerned the identity of their attackers. This resulted in an order to kill all the emigrants, with the exception of small children.

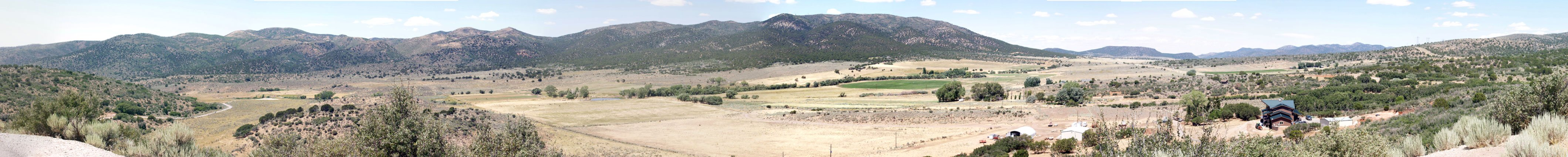
Panorama of the area in 2009

=== Killings and aftermath ===
Four of the nine Nauvoo Legion militiamen indicted in 1874 for murder or conspiracy
(Not shown: William H. Dame • William C. Stewart • Ellott Willden • Samuel Jukes • George Adair, Jr.)

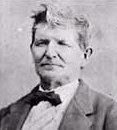
John D. Lee - Only suspect convicted and executed. Constable, judge, Indian Agent. Lee conspired in advance with Haight; led initial siege; falsely offered emigrants safe passage; led unwitting train of victims to their surprise execution.

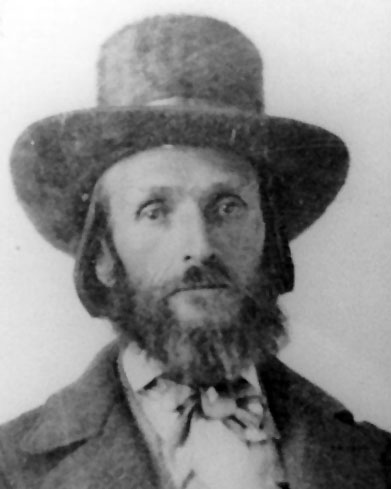
Isaac C. Haight— Stake President, battalion commander, director of Deseret Iron Company.

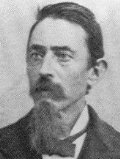
John M. Higbee - Accused by Lee and others of giving the command to begin the killings. Higbee later disavowed responsibility and blamed Lee for the massacre.

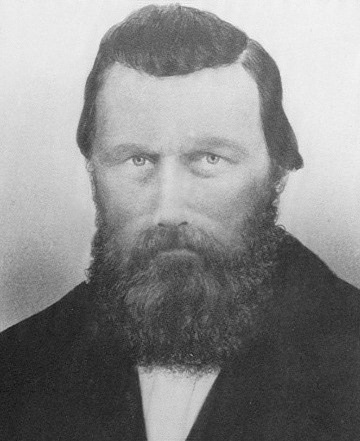
Philip Klingensmith- a Bishop in the church and a private in the militia. Participated in the killings. After disaffiliation from the LDS Church he turned state's evidence against his fellow conspirators.

On Friday, September 11, 1857, two militiamen on horseback approached the Baker–Fancher party wagons, one carrying an American flag and the other with a white flag. They were soon followed by Indian Agent and militia officer John D. Lee who told the battle-weary emigrants that he had negotiated a truce with the Paiutes. Under Mormon protection, the wagon-train members would be escorted safely back to Cedar City, 36 miles (58 km) away, in exchange for turning all of their livestock and supplies over to the Native Americans. Accepting this offer, the emigrants were led out of their fortification, with the adult men being separated from the women and children. The men were paired with a militia escort and when the signal was given, the militiamen turned and shot the male members of the Baker–Fancher party standing by their side. The women and children were then ambushed and killed by more militia that were hiding in nearby bushes and ravines. Members of the militia were sworn to secrecy. A plan was set to blame the massacre on the Native Americans.

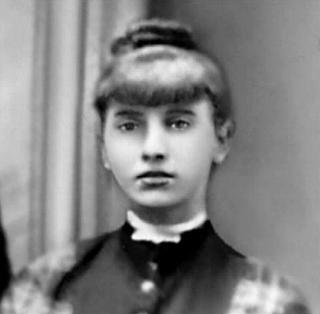
Survivor Nancy Saphrona Huff (4) was taken away along with her family's possessions by John Willis to reside at his house until she was returned to relatives in Arkansas two years later.

The militia did not kill small children who were deemed too young to relate what had happened. Nancy Huff, one of the seventeen survivors and just over four years old at the time of the massacre, recalled in an 1875 statement that an eighteenth survivor was killed directly in front of the other children. "At the close of the massacre there was eighteen children still alive, one girl, some ten or twelve years old, they said was too big and could tell, so they killed her, leaving seventeen." The survivors were taken in by local Mormon families. Seventeen of the children were later reclaimed by the US Army and returned to relatives in Arkansas. The treatment of these children while they were held by the Mormons is uncertain, but Captain James Lynch's statement in May 1859 said the surviving children were "in a most wretched condition, half starved, half naked, filthy, infested with vermin, and their eyes diseased from the cruel neglect to which they had been exposed." Lynch's July 1859 affidavit added that they when they first saw the children they had "little or no clothing" and were "covered with filth and dirt".

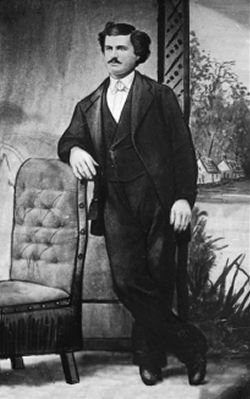
Survivor Christopher "Kit" Fancher as an adult.

Leonard J. Arrington, founder of the Mormon History Association, reports that Brigham Young received the rider, James Haslam, at his office on the same day. When he learned what was contemplated by the militia leaders in Parowan and Cedar City, he sent back a letter stating the Baker–Fancher party was not to be meddled with, and should be allowed to go in peace (although he acknowledged the Native Americans would likely "do as they pleased"). Young's letter arrived two days too late, on September 13, 1857.

The livestock and personal property of the Baker–Fancher party, including women's jewelry, clothing and bedstuffs were distributed or auctioned off to Mormons. Some of the surviving children saw clothing and jewelry that had belonged to their dead mothers and sisters subsequently being worn by Mormon women, and the journalist J.H. Beadle said that jewelry taken from Mountain Meadows was seen in Salt Lake City.

=== Investigations and prosecutions ===
An early investigation was conducted by Brigham Young, who interviewed John D. Lee on September 29, 1857. In 1858, Young sent a report to the Commissioner of Indian Affairs stating that the massacre was the work of Native Americans. The Utah War delayed any investigation by the US federal government until 1859, when Jacob Forney and US Army Brevet Major James Carleton conducted investigations. In Carleton's investigation, at Mountain Meadows he found women's hair tangled in sage brush and the bones of children still in their mothers' arms. Carleton later said it was "a sight which can never be forgotten." After gathering up the skulls and bones of those who had died, Carleton's troops buried them and erected a cairn and cross.

Carleton interviewed a few local Mormon settlers and Paiute Native American chiefs and concluded that there was Mormon involvement in the massacre. He issued a report in May 1859, addressed to the US Assistant Adjutant-General, setting forth his findings. Jacob Forney, Superintendent of Indian Affairs for Utah, also conducted an investigation that included visiting the region in the summer of 1859. Forney retrieved many of the surviving children of massacre victims who had been housed with Mormon families and gathered them up for transportation to their relatives in Arkansas. Forney concluded that the Paiutes did not act alone and the massacre would not have occurred without the white settlers, and Carleton report to the US Congress called the mass killings a "heinous crime", blaming both local and senior church leaders for the massacre.

In March 1859, Judge John Cradlebaugh, a federal judge brought into the territory after the Utah War, convened a grand jury in Provo concerning the massacre, but the jury declined any indictments. Nevertheless, Cradlebaugh conducted a tour of the Mountain Meadows area with a military escort. He attempted to arrest John D. Lee, Isaac Haight, and John Higbee, who fled before they could be found. Cradlebaugh publicly charged Brigham Young as an instigator to the massacre and therefore an "accessory before the fact". Possibly as a protective measure against the mistrusted federal court system, Mormon territorial probate court judge Elias Smith arrested Young under a territorial warrant, perhaps hoping to divert any trial of Young into a friendly Mormon territorial court. Apparently because no federal charges ensued, Young was released.

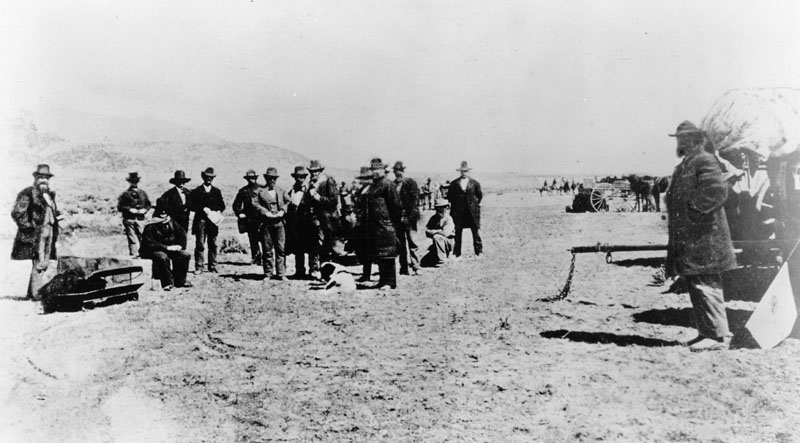
The scene at Lee's execution by Utah firing squad on March 23, 1877. Lee is seated, next to his coffin.

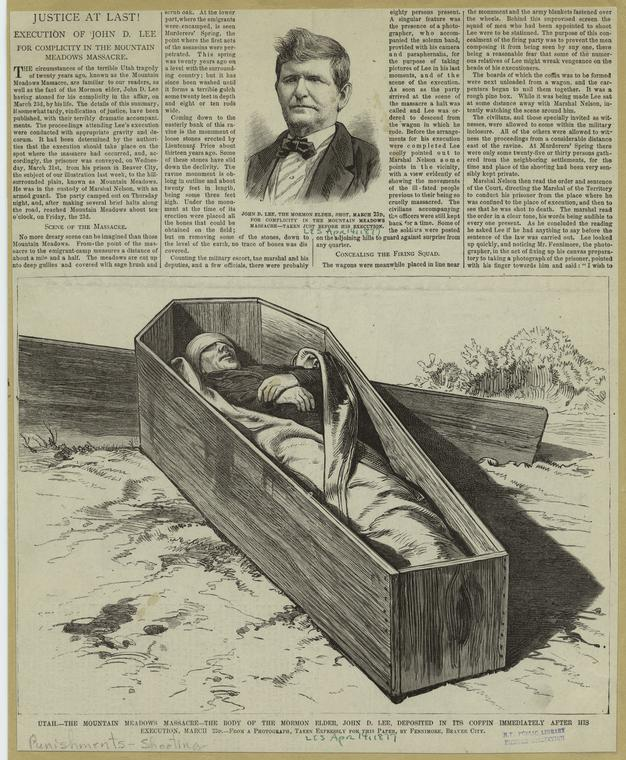
1877 article on John D. Lee's execution.

Further investigations were cut short by the American Civil War in 1861. The US posted bounties of $5000 USD (equivalent to $127,300 in 2025) each for the capture of Haight, Higbee, Stewart, and Philip Klingensmith. Dame, Klingensmith, Ellott Willden, and George Adair Jr. were indicted and arrested while warrants to pursue the arrests of four others who had gone into hiding (Haight, Higbee, William C. Stewart, and Samuel Jukes) were being obtained. Klingensmith escaped prosecution by agreeing to testify. Brigham Young excommunicated some participants, including Haight and Lee, from the LDS Church in 1870. Philip Klingensmith had been a bishop but then had left the church and moved to Nevada by the time of his arrest.

Lee was arrested on November 7, 1874. His first trial began on July 23, 1875, in Beaver, before a jury of eight Mormons and four non-Mormons. One of Lee's defense attorneys was Enos D. Hoge, a former territorial supreme court justice. The trial led to a hung jury on August 5, 1875. Lee's second trial began September 13, 1876, before an all-Mormon jury. The prosecution called Daniel Wells, Laban Morrill, Joel White, Samuel Knight, Samuel McMurdy, Nephi Johnson, and Jacob Hamblin. Lee also stipulated, against advice of counsel, that the prosecution be allowed to re-use the depositions of Young and Smith from the previous trial. Lee called no witnesses in his defense, and was convicted.

Lee was entitled under Utah Territorial statute to choose the method of his execution from three possible options: hanging, firing squad, or decapitation. At sentencing, Lee chose to be executed by firing squad. In his final words before his sentence was carried out at Mountain Meadows on March 23, 1877, Lee said that he was a scapegoat for others involved. Brigham Young stated that Lee's fate was just, but it was not a sufficient blood atonement, given the enormity of the crime.

== Criticism and analysis ==
=== Media coverage ===
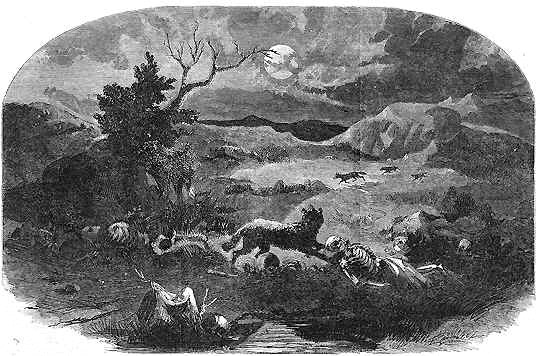
Unburied corpses left after the massacre depicted on the cover of Harper's Weekly magazine.

Published reports of the incident date back at least to October 1857 in the Los Angeles Star. A notable report on the incident was made in 1859 by Carleton, who had been sent by the US Army to investigate the incident and bury the corpses at Mountain Meadows. The first period of intense nationwide publicity about the massacre began around 1872 after investigators obtained Klingensmith's confession. In 1868 C. V. Waite published "An Authentic History Of Brigham Young" which described the events. In 1872, Mark Twain commented on the massacre through the lens of contemporary American public opinion in an appendix to his semi-autobiographical travel book Roughing It. In 1873, the massacre was given a full chapter in T. B. H. Stenhouse's Mormon history The Rocky Mountain Saints. The massacre also received international attention, with various international and national newspapers also covering John D. Lee's 1874 and 1877 trials as well as his execution in 1877.

The massacre has been treated extensively by several historical works, beginning with Lee's Confession in 1877, expressing his opinion that George A. Smith was sent to southern Utah by Brigham Young to direct the massacre. In 1910, the massacre was the subject of a short book by Josiah F. Gibbs, who also attributed responsibility for the massacre to Young and Smith. The first detailed and comprehensive work using modern historical methods was The Mountain Meadows Massacre in 1950 by Juanita Brooks, a Mormon scholar who lived near the area in southern Utah. Brooks found no evidence of direct involvement by Brigham Young but charged him with obstructing the investigation and provoking the attack through his rhetoric.

The LDS Church denied any involvement by Mormons, and into the 21st century was relatively silent on the issue. In 1872, it excommunicated some of the participants for their role in the massacre. Even after irrefutable evidence surfaced in 1999, the LDS Church did not officially recognize its members' responsibility for the attack through at least 2002. In September 2007, 150 years after the tragedy, the LDS Church published its first official statement of regret on the topic, and told the Associated Press via a church spokesperson that the statement should not be seen as an apology.

In modern times, the murders have been called an act of domestic terrorism in many works of literature, and is considered the largest act of domestic terrorism in United States history prior to the 1995 Oklahoma City bombing. Other descriptors include "the darkest deed of the nineteenth century" and "a crime that has no parallel in American history for atrocity". LDS historian Richard Turley called it "the worst event in Latter-day Saint history", and historian of the American West Will Bagley stated it was "the most brutal act of religious terrorism in America history" before the 2001 September 11 attacks.

=== Varying perspectives ===
As described by Richard E. Turley Jr., Ronald W. Walker, and Glen M. Leonard, historians from different backgrounds have taken different approaches to describe the massacre and those involved:

- Portraying the perpetrators (white Mormon settlers) as fundamentally good and the Baker−Fancher party as evil people who committed outrageous acts of anti-Mormon instigation prior to the massacre;
- Describing the opposite view that the perpetrators were evil and the emigrants were innocent;
- Portraying the perpetrators and victims as complicated, and that many different coinciding circumstances contributed to the Mormon settlers committing an atrocity against travelers who, regardless of the authenticity of any accusations of anti-Mormon behavior, did not deserve the punishment of death.

Prior to 1985, many textbooks available in Utah Public Schools blamed the Paiute people as primarily responsible for the massacre or placed equal blame on the Paiute and Mormon settlers (if they mentioned the massacre at all).

=== Explanatory theories ===
Historians have ascribed the massacre to a number of factors, including strident Mormon teachings in the years prior to the massacre, war hysteria, and the alleged involvement of Brigham Young.

==== Strident Mormon teachings ====
For the decade prior to the Baker–Fancher party's arrival there, Utah Territory existed as a theodemocracy led by Brigham Young. During the mid-1850s, Young instituted a Mormon Reformation, intending to "lay the axe at the root of the tree of sin and iniquity". In January 1856, Young said "the government of God, as administered here" may to some seem "despotic" because "...judgment is dealt out against the transgression of the law of God."

During the preceding decades, the religion had undergone a period of intense persecution in the American Midwest. They were officially expelled from, and an Extermination Order was issued by Governor Boggs, the state of Missouri during the 1838 Mormon War, during which prominent Mormon apostle David W. Patten was killed in the Battle of Crooked River. After Mormons moved to Nauvoo, Illinois, the religion's founder Joseph Smith and his brother Hyrum Smith were killed in 1844. Following these events, faithful Mormons migrated west hoping to escape persecution. In May 1857, just months before the Mountain Meadows massacre, apostle Parley P. Pratt was shot dead in Arkansas by Hector McLean, the estranged husband of Eleanor McLean Pratt, one of Pratt's plural wives. Parley Pratt and Eleanor entered a Celestial marriage (under the theocratic law of the Utah Territory), but Hector had refused Eleanor a divorce. "When she left San Francisco she left Hector, and later she was to state in a court of law that she had left him as a wife the night he drove her from their home. Whatever the legal situation, she thought of herself as an unmarried woman."

Mormon leaders immediately proclaimed Pratt as another martyr, with Brigham Young stating, "Nothing has happened so hard to reconcile my mind to since the death of Joseph." Many Mormons held the people of Arkansas collectively responsible. "It was in accordance with Mormon policy to hold every Arkansan accountable for Pratt's death, just as every Missourian was hated because of the expulsion of the church from that state."

Mormon leaders were teaching that the Second Coming of Jesus was imminent – "...there are those now living upon the earth who will live to see the consummation" and "...we now bear witness that his coming is near at hand". Based on a somewhat ambiguous statement by Joseph Smith, some Mormons believed that Jesus would return in 1891 and that God would soon exact punishment against the United States for persecuting Mormons and martyring Joseph Smith, Hyrum Smith, Patten and Pratt. In their Endowment ceremony, faithful early Latter-day Saints took an oath to pray that God would take vengeance against the murderers. (Note: In 1904, several witnesses said that the oath as it then existed was that participants would never cease to pray that God would avenge the blood of the prophets on this nation", and that they would teach this practice to their posterity "unto the 3rd and 4th generation". The oath was deleted from the ceremony in the early 20th century.) As a result of this oath, several Mormon apostles and other leaders considered it their religious duty to kill the prophets' murderers if they ever came across them. The sermons, blessings, and private counsel by Mormon leaders just before the Mountain Meadows massacre can be understood as encouraging private individuals to execute God's judgment against the wicked. (Note: Examples of these teachings include: Quinn (1997), p. 247: The "Diary of Daniel Davis, July 8, 1849", held in the LDS archives states that Young said "if any one was catched stealing to shoot them dead on the spot and they should not be hurt for it".; Young (1856b), p. 247: Young states that a man would be justified in putting a javelin through his plural wife caught in the act of adultery, but anyone intending to "execute judgment...has got to have clean hands and a pure heart...else they had better let the matter alone".; Young (1857b), p. 219: Young states, "[I]f [your neighbor] needs help, help him; and if he wants salvation and it is necessary to spill his blood on the earth in order that he may be saved, spill it".; Young (1855), p. 311: "[I]n regard to those who have persecuted this people and driven them to the mountains, I intend to meet them on their own grounds...I will tell you how it could be done, we could take the same law they have taken, viz., mobocracy, and if any miserable scoundrels come here, cut their throats. (All the people said, Amen)."; Quinn (1997), p. 260: "LDS leaders publicly and privately encouraged Mormons to consider it their right to kill antagonistic outsiders, common criminals, LDS apostates, and even faithful Mormons who committed sins 'worthy of death'.")

In Cedar City, the teachings of church leaders were particularly strident. Mormons in Cedar City were taught that members should ignore dead bodies and go about their business. Col. William H. Dame, the ranking officer in southern Utah who ordered the Mountain Meadows massacre, received a patriarchal blessing in 1854 that he would "be called to act at the head of a portion of thy Brethren and of the Lamanites (Native Americans) in the redemption of Zion and the avenging of the blood of the prophets upon them that dwell on the earth". In June 1857, Philip Klingensmith, another participant, was similarly blessed that he would participate in "avenging the blood of Brother Joseph".

Thus, historians argue that southern Utah Mormons would have been particularly affected by an unsubstantiated rumor that the Baker–Fancher wagon train had been joined by a group of eleven miners and plainsmen who called themselves "Missouri Wildcats", (Note: It is uncertain whether the Missouri Wildcat group stayed with the slow-moving Baker–Fancher party after leaving Salt Lake City.) some of whom reportedly taunted, vandalized and "caused trouble" for Mormons and Native Americans along the route (by some accounts claiming that they had the gun that "shot the guts out of Old Joe Smith"). They were also affected by the report to Brigham Young that the Baker–Fancher party was from Arkansas where Pratt was murdered. It was rumored that Pratt's wife recognized some of the Mountain Meadows party as being in the gang that shot and stabbed Pratt.

==== War hysteria ====
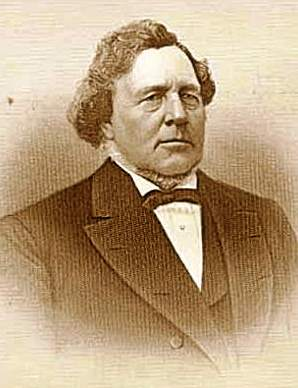
George A. Smith, Apostle who met the Baker–Fancher party before touring Parowan and neighboring settlements before the massacre

The Mountain Meadows massacre was caused in part by events relating to the Utah War, an 1857 deployment toward the Utah Territory of the United States Army, whose arrival was peaceful. In the summer of 1857, however, the Mormons expected an all-out invasion of apocalyptic significance. From July to September 1857, Mormon leaders and their followers prepared for a siege that could have ended up similar to the seven-year Bleeding Kansas problem occurring at the time. Mormons were required to stockpile grain, and were enjoined against selling grain to emigrants for use as cattle feed. As far-off Mormon colonies retreated, Parowan and Cedar City became isolated and vulnerable outposts. Brigham Young sought to enlist the help of Native American tribes in fighting the "Americans", encouraging them to steal cattle from emigrant trains, and to join Mormons in fighting the approaching army.

Scholars have asserted that George A. Smith's tour of southern Utah influenced the decision to attack and destroy the Fancher–Baker emigrant train near Mountain Meadows, Utah. He met with many of the eventual participants in the massacre, including W. H. Dame, Isaac Haight, John D. Lee and Chief Jackson, leader of a band of Paiutes. He noted that the militia was organized and ready to fight and that some of them were eager to "fight and take vengeance for the cruelties that had been inflicted upon us in the States." Among Smith's party were a number of Paiute Native American chiefs from the Mountain Meadows area. When Smith returned to Salt Lake, Brigham Young met with these leaders on September 1, 1857, and encouraged them to fight against the Americans in the anticipated clash with the US Army. They were also offered all of the livestock then on the road to California, which included that belonging to the Baker–Fancher party. The Native American chiefs were reluctant, and at least one objected they had previously been told not to steal, and declined the offer.

==== Brigham Young ====
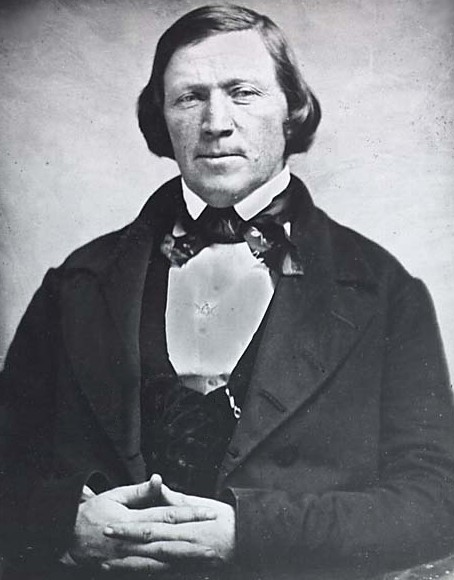
Historians debate the role of Brigham Young in the massacre. Young was theocratic leader of the Utah Territory at the time of the massacre.

There is a consensus among historians that Brigham Young played a role in provoking the massacre, at least unwittingly, and in concealing its evidence after the fact. However, they debate whether Young knew about the planned massacre ahead of time and whether he initially condoned it before later taking a strong public stand against it. Young's use of inflammatory and violent language in response to the Federal expedition added to the tense atmosphere at the time of the attack. Following the massacre, Young stated in public forums that God had taken vengeance on the Baker–Fancher party. It is unclear whether Young held this view because he believed that this specific group posed an actual threat to colonists or because he believed that the group was directly responsible for past crimes against Mormons. However, in Young's only known correspondence prior to the massacre, he told the Church leaders in Cedar City:

In regard to emigration trains passing through our settlements, we must not interfere with them until they are first notified to keep away. You must not meddle with them. The Indians we expect will do as they please but you should try and preserve good feelings with them. There are no other trains going south that I know of[.] [I]f those who are there will leave let them go in peace.

According to historian MacKinnon, "After the [Utah] war, U.S. President James Buchanan implied that face-to-face communications with Brigham Young might have averted the conflict, and Young argued that a north-south telegraph line in Utah could have prevented the Mountain Meadows massacre." MacKinnon suggests that hostilities could have been avoided if Young had traveled east to Washington D.C. to resolve governmental problems instead of taking a five-week trip north on the eve of the Utah War for church-related reasons.

A modern forensic assessment of a key affidavit, purportedly given by William Edwards in 1924, has complicated the debate on complicity of senior Mormon leadership in the Mountain Meadows massacre. Analysis indicates that Edwards's signature may have been traced and that the typeset belonged to a typewriter manufactured in the 1950s. The Utah State Historical Society, which maintains the document in its archives, acknowledges a possible connection to Mark Hofmann, a convicted forger and extortionist, via go-between Lyn Jacobs who provided the society with the document.

== Remembrances ==
The first monument for the victims was built two years after the massacre, by Major Carleton and the US Army. This monument was a simple cairn built over the gravesite of 34 victims, and was topped by a large cedar cross. The monument was found destroyed and the structure was replaced by the US Army in 1864. By some reports, the monument was destroyed in 1861, when Young brought an entourage to Mountain Meadows. Wilford Woodruff, who later became President of the Church, said that upon reading the inscription on the cross, which read, "Vengeance is mine, thus saith the Lord. I shall repay", Young responded, "it should be vengeance is mine and I have taken a little." In 1932, residents of the surrounding area constructed a memorial wall around the remnants of the monument.

Starting in 1988, the Mountain Meadows Association, composed of descendants of both the Baker–Fancher party victims and the Mormon participants, designed a new monument in the meadows; this monument was completed in 1990 and is maintained by the Utah State Division of Parks and Recreation. In 1999, the LDS Church replaced the US Army's cairn and the 1932 memorial wall with a second monument, which it now maintains. In August 1999, when the LDS Church's construction of the 1999 monument had started, the remains of at least 28 massacre victims were dug up by a backhoe. The forensic evidence showed that the remains of the males had been shot by firearms at close range and that the remains of the women and children showed evidence of blunt force trauma.

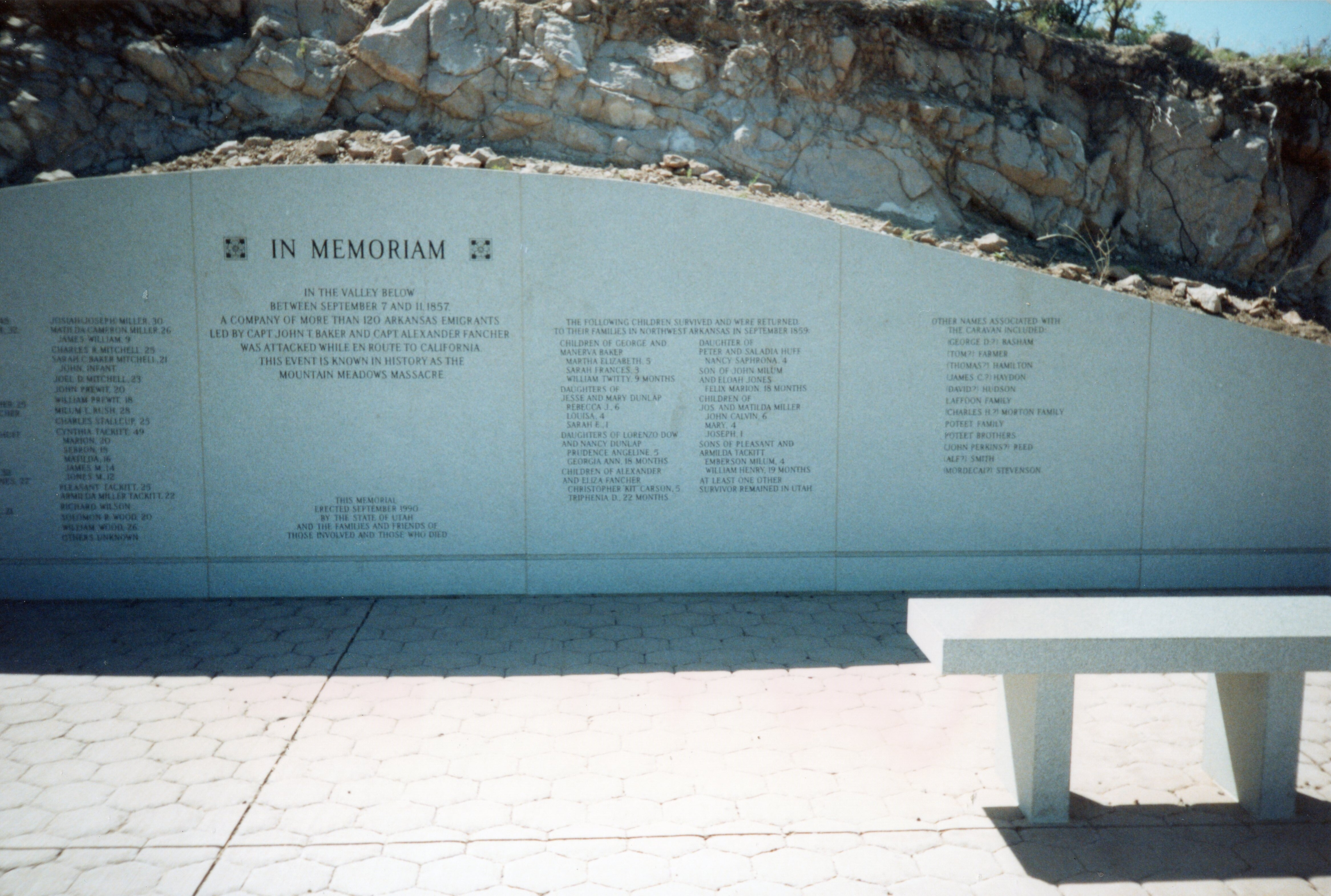
Memorial monument built at the site in 1990

In 1955, to memorialize the victims of the massacre, a monument was installed in the town square of Harrison, Arkansas. On one side of this monument is a map and short summary of the massacre, while the opposite side contains a list of the victims. In 2005, a replica of the US Army's original 1859 cairn was built in the community of Carrollton, Arkansas, the former county seat of Carroll County, Arkansas. It is maintained by the Mountain Meadows Monument Foundation.

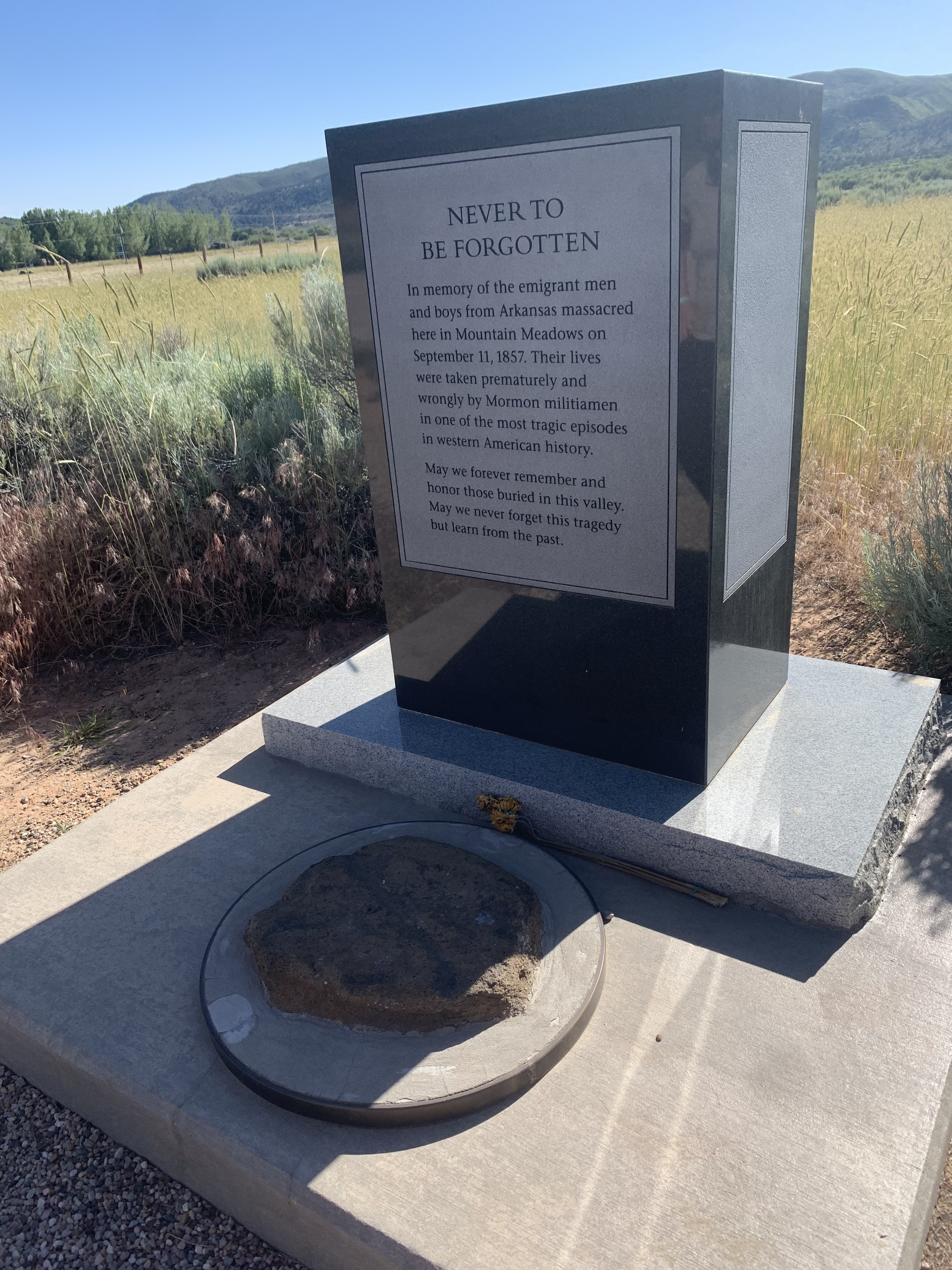
Marker added in 2011 near State Route 18

In 2007, the 150th anniversary of the massacre was remembered by a ceremony held in the meadows. Approximately 400 people, including many descendants of those slain at Mountain Meadows and Elder Henry B. Eyring of the LDS Church's Quorum of the Twelve Apostles attended this ceremony.

In 2011, the site was designated as a National Historic Landmark after joint efforts by descendants of those killed and the LDS Church. The LDS Church also worked with descendants to erect twenty additional markers that same year.

In 2014, archaeologist Everett Bassett discovered two rock piles he believes mark additional graves. The locations of the possible graves are on private land and not at any of the monument sites owned by the LDS Church. The Mountain Meadows Monument Foundation has expressed their desire that the sites be conserved and given national monument status. Other descendant groups have been more hesitant in accepting the sites as legitimate grave markers.

== In media ==
=== Works of non-fiction ===
- Vengeance Is Mine: The Mountain Meadows Massacre and Its Aftermath, by Richard E. Turley, Barbara Jones Brown, (2023)
- Massacre at Mountain Meadows, by Ronald W. Walker, Richard E. Turley, Glen M. Leonard (2008)
- House of Mourning: A Biocultural History of the Mountain Meadows Massacre, by Shannon A. Novak (2008)
- Burying The Past, a documentary film by Brian Patrick (2004)
- American Massacre, by Sally Denton (2003)
- Blood of the Prophets, by Will Bagley (2002)
- The Mountain Meadows Massacre, by Juanita Brooks (1950)

=== Works of historical fiction ===
- None Left to Tell, novel by Noelle West Ihli (2024) – Tells the story of the Mountain Meadows massacre from the perspectives of three women and one child who were involved.
- American Primeval by Mark L. Smith (2024) – Largely fictional telling of several violent clashes in the Utah Territory, including the massacre.
- Variation West by Ardyth Kennelly (2014) – A novel of 4 generations of a family in Utah, beginning with 2 fictional daughters of John D. Lee, with the Mountain Meadows massacre as backdrop.
- September Dawn by Christopher Cain (2007) – The film is a fictional love story between real characters who were involved in the massacre.
- Red Water by Judith Freeman (2002) – A novel about how the wives of John D. Lee have to come to terms with their husband's actions.
- Redeye by Clyde Edgerton (1995) – A novel about a fictional bounty hunter, Cobb Pittman, who with his catch dog, Redeye, tracks down Mormons responsible for the Mountain Meadows Massacre.
- The Star Rover by Jack London (1915) – Protagonist Darrell Standing is reincarnated as Jesse Fancher.

== See also ==
- Aiken massacre – A lynching reportedly ordered by Mormon leaders two months later
- Anti-Mormonism – Hostility towards the Latter Day Saint movement
- Christian terrorism – Terrorist acts by groups or individuals who profess Christian motivations or goals
- Christianity and violence
- Haun's Mill massacre – An attack on Mormons
- History of the Latter Day Saint movement
- Missouri Executive Order 44 – An 1838 governor's order that Mormons be "exterminated" or driven from Missouri
- Mormonism and violence
- Native American people and Mormonism
- Terrorism in the United States
