= Isaac C. Haight =

American politician

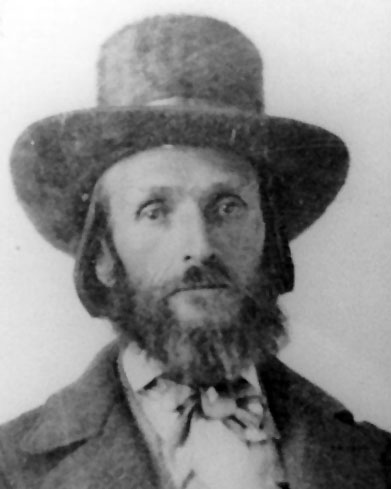

Personal details
- Born: Isaac Chauncey Haight; May 27, 1813; Windham, New York, United States
- Died: September 8, 1886 (aged 73); Thatcher, Arizona, United States
- Spouse(s): Eliza Ann Snyder (m. 1836) Mary Spring Murray (m. 1849) Eliza Ann Price (m. 1853) Annabella Sinclair MacFarlane (m. 1853) Elizabeth Summers (m. 1858)

Isaac Chauncey Haight (May 27, 1813 – September 8, 1886), was a pioneer of the American West best remembered as a ringleader in the Mountain Meadows massacre. An early convert to the Latter Day Saint movement, he was raised on a farm in New York, and became a Baptist at age 18, hoping to become a missionary in Burma. He educated himself, and found work as a schoolteacher. He converted to Mormonism and set out to convert others in his neighborhood, building up a branch with forty members. To escape religious persecution, his family (wife and infant daughter, parents, one brother and two sisters, all of whom had joined the church) arrived in Nauvoo, Illinois in July, 1842.

He worked as a constable in Nauvoo, and was frequently asked to serve as a bodyguard for Joseph Smith. Haight was the first member of Church of Jesus Christ of Latter Day Saints to hear of the death of Joseph Smith, the founder of the Latter Day Saint Movement, when the messenger delivering the news of his assassination rode up to the Nauvoo Temple, which Haight was guarding.

He emigrated with the Church of Jesus Christ of Latter-day Saints (LDS Church) to Utah in 1847. In December, 1849 Haight and fifty others were sent by Brigham Young to explore the mountains in southern Utah, about 300 mi (480 km) south from Salt Lake City. Among these explorers were Parley P. Pratt and George A. Smith, who also established a winter home there. From 1850 to 1852, he was sent to England to learn iron making, and upon his return was placed in charge of purchasing and assembling supplies for thousands of new European converts to cross the plains. In 1853, he married two additional wives. Upon his return to Utah, he was appointed to the territorial legislature, and was the first mayor of Cedar City, Utah where he was a farmer.

== Mountain Meadows massacre ==
At the time of the Mountain Meadows massacre, Haight was the Stake President over several Wards in the area. Haight was in command of the Second Battalion, Tenth Regiment (or Iron County Militia), in which capacity he ordered the massacre of September 11, 1857, of the Baker-Fancher party of emigrants during the Utah War.

The Baker-Fancher train was one of several emigrant trains traveling through the area on their way to California at the time. George A. Smith had come down to southern Utah settlements and given orders for residents to prepare for war with United States troops who were approaching Utah to replace Governor Brigham Young. Haight promised Smith that the Tenth Regiment (of which Haight was second-in-command) could accomplish the ambush and destruction of "invading" federal troops before the troops would be able to make their way down through the canyons into the valleys.

Jacob Hamblin had just been called to be the new president of a mission to Utah's Native Indian tribes. Hamblin had been dispatched to escort Chief Tutsegavit and other southern Utah Paiute chiefs to Salt Lake City where they were to meet with Brigham Young. At this meeting, Young communicated to them the policy that if the natives assisted the Latter-day Saints in fighting the Americans, the tribes were to be granted all the cattle on the California trails. Meanwhile, militia in southern Utah were mustered to search the canyons for invading troops and assist natives raiding settlers' stock.

1857	Chronology
(by July 24)	Southern Utah Latter-day Saints receive reports that 2,500 federal troops are approaching Utah.
August 4	Brigham Young writes Hamblin concerning Hamblin's appointment as liaison to Native tribes.
August 8	George A. Smith is in Parowan.
August 21	Smith in Cedar City hears report (believed at the time but only later found to be false) of 600 federal troops in the mountains immediately east of the settlements. Thereafter, Smith leaves the settlements for Salt Lake City.
September 5	Haight meets with John D. Lee in the early a.m. at the at-that-hour deserted location of the settlements' iron works and together they plan the "Paiute" attack on the first emigrant train.

Later in the afternoon of September 5:

at a meeting of the high council in Cedar City, a divisive and quarrelsome debate was held to discuss the recent troubles with the passing emigrant train. Those present - stake president Haight, his counselor John Higbee, Bishop Klingensmith and high councilor Laban Morrill among others - generally agreed on the grievances they perceived in the company that had passed the previous Thursday. The cloud of war spreading over the territory prompted open debate of such extreme measures as attacking the train. Other, more moderate options were proposed. But there was no consensus on what action to take. Morrill extracted a promise that an express rider would be dispatched immediately for Great Salt Lake Valley to get directions from Brigham Young.

On September 6, Haight gave a speech in which he said, "I am prepared to feed to the Gentiles the same bread they fed to us. God being my helper, I will give the last ounce of strength and if need be my last drop of blood in defense of Zion."

That evening, the extended families making the Baker-Fancher train set up their camp in Mountain Meadows. After a siege of the train by Paiutes and militiamen (some of whom were disguised as Natives) for four or five days, militiamen ceremoniously arrived at the scene without disguise and approached the embattled train. For reasons still unclear, the militia used a subterfuge of offering safe passage to the emigrants in exchange for the emigrants' disarming and turning their cattle over to the Paiutes—but after the emigrants were disarmed, militia members and Paiutes murdered all of the emigrant party except young children: about 120 slaughtered with seventeen children spared.

== Aftermath ==
Investigations were interrupted by the U.S. Civil War. Brigham Young removed Haight and certain others of the conspirators from good standing (excommunicated them) from the LDS Church in 1870. By 1874, Haight and eight others (John D. Lee, John M. Higbee, William H. Dame, Philip Klingensmith, William C. Stewart, Elliot Willden, Samuel Jukes, and George Adair Jr.) were indicted. Haight went into hiding with his son, Caleb, in Mormon outposts in southern Utah, Mexico, and Arizona. He remained a fugitive from federal authorities for the rest of his life. A reward of $500 each was posted for the capture of Haight, Higbee and Stewart. Only John D. Lee ever stood trial. Lee was convicted and executed by firing squad on March 23, 1877.

== Death ==
Haight died September 8, 1886, in Thatcher, Arizona at the age of 73.
