= Mormon Reformation =

Renewed emphasis on spirituality within LDS church

The Mormon Reformation was a period of renewed emphasis on spirituality within the Church of Jesus Christ of Latter-day Saints (LDS Church), and a centrally-directed movement, which called for a spiritual reawakening among church members. It took place during 1856 and 1857 and was under the direction of church president Brigham Young.

During the Reformation, Young sent his close counselor Jedediah M. Grant and other church leaders to preach throughout Utah Territory and surrounding Latter-day Saint communities with the goal of inspiring them to reject sin and turn towards spiritual things. During this time, some of the most conservative or reactionary elements of LDS Church doctrine came to dominate public discussion. As part of the Reformation, almost all active or involved LDS Church members were rebaptized as a symbol of their commitment. The Reformation took place within the context of other events, notably severe drought which damaged the region's agricultural economy, and the earliest public discussion of the LDS principle of plural marriage. The Mountain Meadows Massacre of 1857 took place in the emotionally charged circumstances of the Reformation.

Later analysis of the Reformation classifies the movement in three phases: a structural reform phase, a phase of intense demand for a demonstration of spiritual reform, and a final phase during which an emphasis was placed on love and reconstruction.

== History ==
Jedediah M. Grant, one of the leading figures of the Mormon Reformation until his death in 1856.

=== Economic and spiritual issues ===
All pioneers who gathered to the Utah Territory between 1847 and the mid-1850s under the direction of Brigham Young, whether members of the LDS Church or sympathetic non-members, were welcome as long as they helped to build up Zion. Developing the land required heavy physical labor. Church members who were willing to physically strengthen the Mormon settlements were so valued that "problems they might have with smoking, drinking, profaning, Sabbath breaking, and even immoral living did not normally cost them their standing in the community and the Church." Consequently, by the early 1850s, many communities within the Mormon settlement region were prosperous and secure, yet contained a segment of inhabitants whose personal practices were not within the exacting standards of the LDS Church.

In 1852, Brigham Young felt that the church in Utah was secure enough to announce the practice of plural marriage to the world. Shortly after the announcement, however, the Latter-day Saints in Utah experienced a period of hardship. The population of the Utah territory had increased rapidly as converts from Europe joined American Saints in their migration across the Great Plains. In 1855, a drought struck, due to light snowfall during the winter of 1854. In addition to the damage caused by drought, an infestation of grasshoppers and crickets destroyed their meager crops, and around a third of the valley's cattle perished due to the cold. During the winter of 1855–56, flour and other basic necessities were very scarce and very costly. Heber C. Kimball wrote his son, "Dollars and cents do not count now, in these times, for they are the tightest that I have ever seen in the territory of Utah."

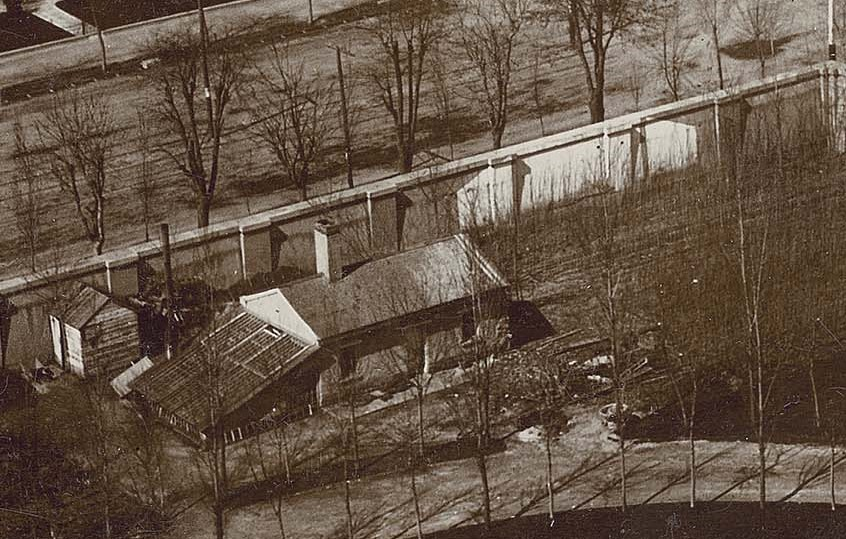
Enlargement of a photograph of the northwestern corner of Temple Square, taken by Charles R. Savage from the roof of the Salt Lake Temple, ca. 1892–93. The whitened section on the wall shows where the baptistry constructed during the Reformation next to the Endowment House had stood.

=== Involvement of church leaders ===
In September 1856, as the drought continued, the trials and difficulties of the previous year led to an explosion of intense soul-searching. Church leaders had viewed the economic disasters of the previous years as acts of God, and sensed that something was needed to assist the Saints in their quest for temporal survival and spiritual salvation. Brigham Young, at a church meeting on September 21, 1856, stated: "We need a reformation in the midst of this people; we need a thorough reform."

Jedediah M. Grant, a counselor in the First Presidency and a well-known conservative voice, took interest in the cause. He has been described by contemporary authors as being sensible, generous, well-educated, and given to robust oratory, all of which aided the Reformation. At a quarterly conference in Kaysville, Utah, Grant and Joseph Young of the First Council of the Seventy delivered various sermons over the span of four days, calling for repentance and a general recommitment to moral living and religious teachings. Five hundred people presented themselves for rebaptism as a symbol of their determination to reform their lives. The zealous message spread from Kaysville to surrounding Mormon communities. Church leaders traveled around the territory, expressing their concern about signs of spiritual decay and "backsliding", and calling for repentance. Members were asked to seal their rededication with rebaptism, and a new baptismal font was dedicated on the east side of the Endowment House on Temple Square for the purpose of rebaptism. Rebaptism as a practice was not unique to the Reformation, and the practice, which had begun in the 1830s, continued to be commonplace throughout the nineteenth century. It was later discouraged by the First Presidency in 1879.

The meetings conducted by Grant and Young during the Reformation were similar to those held during the 1830s when the saints resided in Ohio, contained the same types of religious experiences. These types of manifestations, however, had largely been absent from the Nauvoo and earlier Utah experiences, such as speaking in tongues, prophesying, and seeing visions.

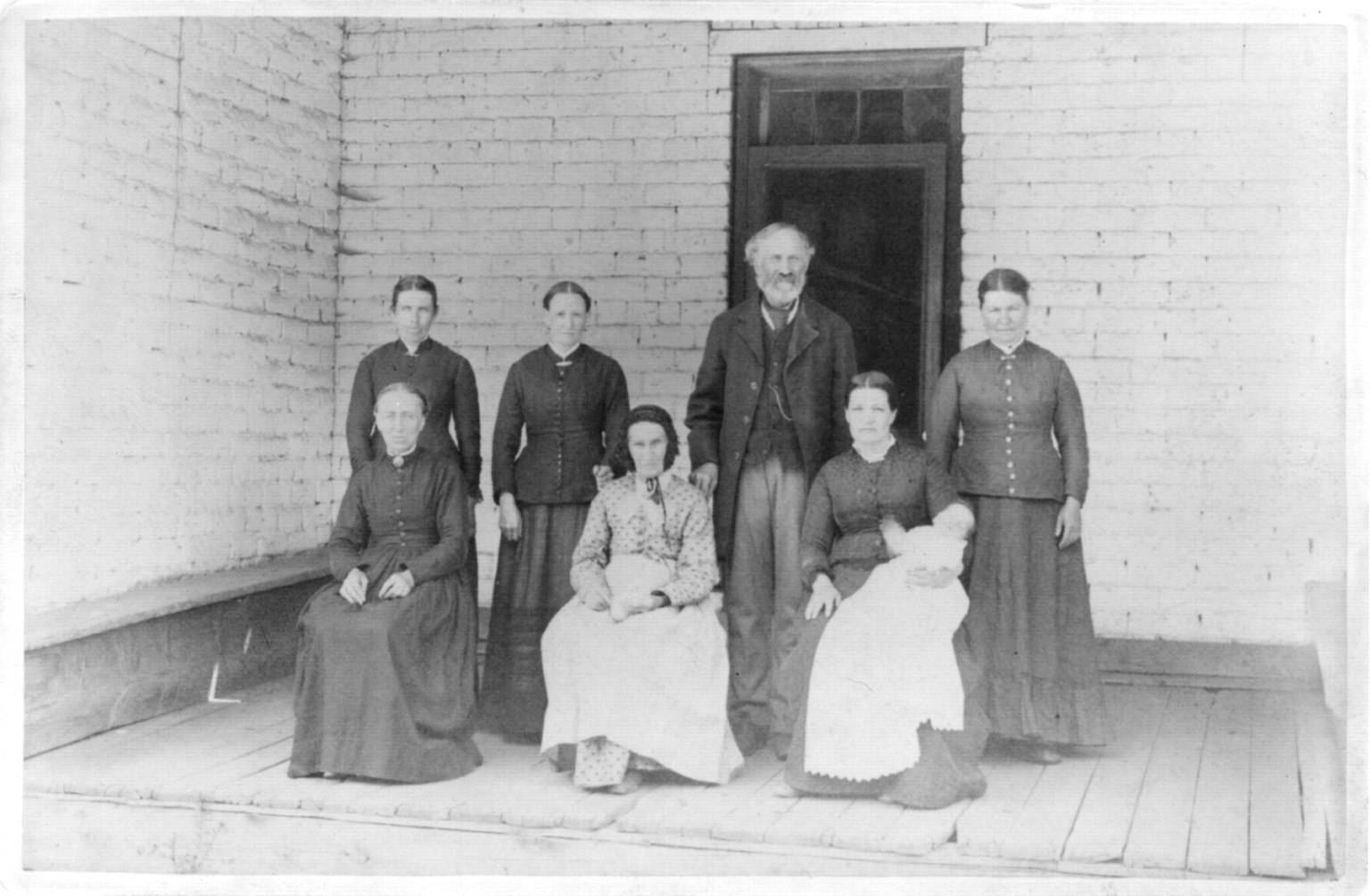
A Latter-day Saint photographed with his five wives and his mother. During the Reformation, there was a measurable increase in the number of plural marriages among members of the church.

The Reformation was endorsed by all three members of the First Presidency, as well as several apostles, who gave fiery sermons in favor of greater orthodoxy, and rebaptism in preparation for the full practice of "celestial law" in Utah Territory prior to the Second Coming, which they suspected would be soon. Brigham Young played a key role in the circulation of the Mormon Reformation with his emphasis on plural marriage, rebaptism, and passionate preaching and oration. He also introduced various controversial doctrines, such as blood atonement and the Adam-God doctrine, both of which were rejected by other church leaders. According to Brigham Young: "The time is coming when justice will be laid to the line and righteousness to the plummet; when we shall take the old broadsword and ask, Are you for God? And if you are not heartily on the Lord's side, you will be hewn down."

By the end of September 1856, the Reformation had gained enough momentum to carry it to the rest of the Mormon settlements. Throughout the winter, special meetings were held, and church members urged each other to adhere to the commandments of God and the practices and precepts of the church. Preaching placed special emphasis on the practice of plural marriage, adherence to the Word of Wisdom, attendance at church meetings, and personal prayer. Various sermons also focused on improving personal appearance, dress, and hygiene. In one sermon, Jedediah Grant urged members to uphold their baptismal covenants through "observing cleanliness in their persons and dwellings, setting their families in order, [and] carefully cultivating their farms and gardens..." Although Grant died of pneumonia in December 1856 at age forty, shortly after one of his winter tours, the influence of the Reformation spread throughout the Mormon colonies and settlements. On December 30, 1856, the entire all-Mormon Utah territorial legislature was rebaptized for the remission of their sins, and reconfirmed under the hands of the Twelve Apostles.

To encourage reformation, certain adjunct theocratic committees may have attempted to ensure order and conformity by censuring local troublemakers. Dissident Mormons of the time reported rumors that committees resorted to summary judgments with punishments meted out by enforcers colloquially termed "Danites" or "destroying angels". For example, the southern Utah pioneer and militia scout of the time John Chatterley later wrote that he had received threats from "secret Committee, called... 'destroying angels'" in late 1856 and early 1857. Contemporary commentators have pointed to pronouncements during the period by Brigham Young and Jedediah Grant that would seem to give vigilante-style bloodshed a religious basis. Young denied that any such acts were condoned by him or the church leadership. In a speech in 1867 Young said:

Is there war in our religion? No; neither war nor bloodshed. Yet our enemies cry out "bloodshed," and "oh, what dreadful men these Mormons are, and those Danites! how they slay and kill!" Such is all nonsense and folly in the extreme. The wicked slay the wicked, and they will lay it on the Saints.

The Reformation also had an effect on the culture and society that had begun to develop among the Mormon community in Utah, due in large part to the Polysophical Society, which had been organized in 1854 by Lorenzo Snow and his sister, Eliza R. Snow. The society promoted large-scale public education through lectures, musical presentations, literature readings, and poetry writing. At the beginning of the Reformation, Jedediah M. Grant and Heber C. Kimball attacked the society, with Grant saying that it possessed an "adulterous spirit". In a possible tongue-in-cheek diary entry, Hannah Tapfield King responded to Grant's. King wrote, "Well, there may be, for he says there is, and probably he understands it. To me it all seemed good and nice, of course a little vanity and folly, and that one sees in the tabernacle and everywhere."

Historian Dean L. May noted that the more zealous reformation efforts were not universally accepted in Utah. As in similar American religious reformation and revival movements, the enormous enthusiasm and dramatic signs of repentance could not be sustained. By the spring of 1857, with the return of more familiar spring rains, the religious life of Mormon communities returned to a more normal pattern. The Reformation appeared to have ended completely by early 1858.

== Blood atonement ==
Several sermons by Willard Richards and George A. Smith that had been delivered earlier in the history of the LDS Church had touched on the concept of blood atonement. The idea of blood atonement was that apostates and those who committed certain sins, such as murder, were beyond the saving power of the blood of Christ and could be redeemed only by the voluntary shedding of their own blood. In a sermon given in March 1856, just before the start of the Reformation, Brigham Young preached that the death and Atonement of Jesus Christ could not cleanse endowed members of the church of certain transgressions, such as adultery, apostasy, and first-degree murder. For these offenses, Young believed that only the voluntary offering of the sinner's own life would be able to expunge the sin. On September 21, 1856, while calling for sincere repentance by church members, Brigham Young took the idea further, stating: "I know that there are transgressors, who, if they knew themselves and the only condition upon which they can obtain forgiveness, would beg of their brethren to shed their blood, that the smoke might ascend to God as an offering to appease the wrath that is kindled against them, and that the law might have its course."

Young reiterated the concept in several other sermons during the Reformation period. Although the belief was never widely accepted by church members, it became part of the public image of the church at the time and was pilloried, along with the practice of polygamy, in newspapers in the Eastern United States. During the subsequent history of the church, the concept was frequently criticized by church members, given that both the Book of Mormon and church doctrine teach that the sacrifice of Christ forms part of an "infinite atonement". Blood atonement was formally repudiated as church doctrine by a manifesto published in the Deseret Weekly in 1889, and again by a letter published by apostle Bruce R. McConkie speaking on behalf of the First Presidency in 1978.

== Impact ==
In addition to the Reformation's appeal to the spiritual and emotional lives of Latter-day Saints, actions taken during the movement had lasting impacts on church members, their families, and the church organization. Among the main outcomes of the Reformation were personal recommitment, communal economic innovation, strengthened unity among church members, and an increase in the number of those entering plural marriage. Gustive O. Larson writes that "Mormonism was a civilizing force at work in the Great Basin. Not unlike the experience of some other Christian communities, it threshed its harvest of converts vigorously, lost some of them together with the tares, but produced thereby a better product. The call to repentance in the Reformation was generally heeded and as a result, in the words of historian Andrew Neff, 'the spiritual tone of the entire Mormon commonwealth was markedly raised.'"

According to historian Paul H. Peterson, the pledges of conformity with church practices led to a measurable increase in plural marriages throughout the Mormon region. Many men who had previously resisted plural marriages were sealed to one or more plural wives. Stanley S. Ivins's statistical research reveals that the number of plural marriages in relation to population was 65 percent higher in 1856–57 than in any other two-year period in Utah history.

The Reformation also resulted in an increase in practical and emotional unity among church members. Historians James Allen and Glen Leonard point out that the Reformation "may have accounted for the fact that the following year the Saints were emotionally prepared to confront the army of the United States en route to Utah." During the conflict, known as the Utah War, Mormon militia were asked to engage in diversionary action on the plains and in Wyoming. Also, church members were prepared, under Brigham Young's direction, to abandon and destroy their homes, farms, and businesses and move again to the White Mountains of Arizona, which Young had selected as a possible place of refuge if full-scale war were to begin. Historians have also asserted that the emotional rhetoric of church leaders contributed to the defensive dialogue and actions in Southern Utah, which ultimately burst forth in the Mountain Meadows massacre.

Additionally, leaders at church headquarters established a policy of assigning two "home" or ward missionaries in each congregational unit. A similar program still exists today within the LDS Church in the form of ministering (formerly known as visiting or home teaching), though much has changed since the Reformation. Ward missionaries were asked to visit each family in the ward, assess their material needs, and provide help wherever possible. They were also asked to inquire into family members' spiritual commitment, including asking searching questions about religious practices. After some months of these missionary visits, Latter-day Saints in Salt Lake City and surrounding communities who had not yet been rebaptized were asked to do so as an expression of their ongoing commitment to the church. Paul H. Peterson asserts that those who refused to be rebaptized might "lose their membership in the church. In Britain, zealous application of Reformation principles resulted in trimming from church rolls a large number of the less-committed." A modest number of less zealous church members left the Utah area, returning to the east or traveling on to California.

== See also ==
- History of the Church of Jesus Christ of Latter-day Saints
- Morrisite War
