= George A. Smith =

Early leader in the Latter Day Saint movement

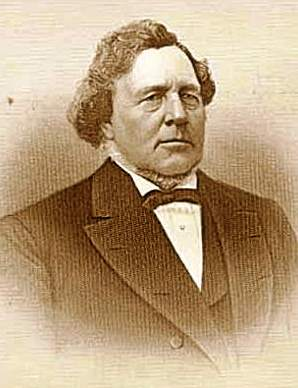

First Counselor in the First Presidency
- October 7, 1868 – September 1, 1875
- Called by: Brigham Young
- Predecessor: Heber C. Kimball
- Successor: John W. Young

Quorum of the Twelve Apostles
- April 26, 1839 – October 7, 1868
- Called by: Joseph Smith
- End reason: Called as First Counselor in the First Presidency

LDS Church Apostle
- April 26, 1839 – September 1, 1875
- Called by: Joseph Smith
- Reason: Replenishing Quorum of the Twelve
- Reorganization at end of term: No apostles ordained

Personal details
- Born: George Albert Smith; June 26, 1817; Potsdam, New York, United States
- Died: September 1, 1875 (aged 58); Salt Lake City, Utah Territory, United States
- Resting place: Salt Lake City Cemetery; 40.777°N 111.858°W
- Spouse(s): 7
- Children: 20
- Parents: John Smith; Clarissa Lyman

George Albert Smith (June 26, 1817 – September 1, 1875) was an early leader in the Latter Day Saint movement. He served in the Quorum of the Twelve Apostles and as a member of the First Presidency of the Church of Jesus Christ of Latter-day Saints (LDS Church).

Smith was a prominent leader in the settlement of many communities in southern Utah, and may have played a role in the chain of events preceding the Mountain Meadows Massacre on September 11, 1857. The city of St. George, Utah, has been said to have been named after him. He is also known as Potato Saint.

== Childhood ==
George A. Smith was born in Potsdam, New York, the son of John Smith and Clarissa Lyman, and was brought up in the Congregational Church. His first cousin was Joseph Smith, the founder of the Latter Day Saint movement. In September 1832, at age 15, George A. Smith was baptized into the Church of Christ, eight months after his parents had been baptized. The following year, John Smith and his family moved to Kirtland, Ohio, the church's new headquarters. There George met his cousin, Joseph, for the first time. In 1838, he moved with his parents and a large body of church members to the state of Missouri.

== Church service ==
In the spring of 1834, the 16-year-old Smith accompanied a group of Latter Day Saints on a 2000-mile march to Missouri and back to Ohio. This trip, known as Zion's Camp, was intended to bring aid to suffering members of the church in Missouri. Smith served as a missionary to the eastern United States, traveling and preaching during the summers of 1835, 1836, and 1837, while attending school each winter.

Smith was ordained a seventy in the priesthood on March 1, 1835, by Joseph Smith. On April 26, 1839, the 21-year-old George A. Smith was ordained an apostle and became a member of the Quorum of the Twelve. Future church president Wilford Woodruff was ordained an apostle on the same day. The two men replaced former apostles Thomas B. Marsh, who had left the church, and Orson Hyde, who had been disfellowshipped and removed from his position.

After Joseph Smith's death and the assumption of church leadership by Brigham Young, George A. Smith traveled to the Salt Lake Valley as a Mormon pioneer with the first company of settlers in 1847. In the winter of 1850, Smith led a company of volunteers to establish a colony in what is now Iron County. The company consisted of 118 individuals and about 30 families; they settled near the Little Salt Lake (today also called Parowan Lake). They arrived at Center Creek, 265 miles from Salt Lake City, on January 13, 1851. Under direction from the General Assembly of the State of Deseret, the group organized the political entity of Iron County and elected Smith as chief justice. During the winter of 1850–51, the settlers constructed a fort enclosing homes, a meeting house, a school, and a watch tower. They named their community Parowan. Smith taught school during the first winter, and later served as a member of Utah's territorial legislature.

In 1868, Smith was called to replace Heber C. Kimball as First Counselor in the First Presidency to church president Young. Smith served in this position until his death in 1875. Smith's first wife, Bathsheba W. Smith, served as general president of the church's Relief Society from 1901 to 1910. A son, John Henry Smith, also served as an apostle and member of the First Presidency. George A. Smith's grandson and namesake, George Albert Smith, also became an apostle and later was the church's eighth president.

Smith was the eighth official Church Historian and General Church Recorder of the LDS Church from 1854 to 1871. In 1873 he was appointed and sustained as Trustee-in-Trust for the church, an office he held until his death.

== Utah War ==
During the hurried series of actions Young and LDS Church leaders initiated on learning of the imminent arrival of U.S. troops into Utah Territory in 1857–8, Smith left Salt Lake City to visit southern Utah communities. Scholars have asserted that Smith's tour, speeches, and personal actions contributed to the fear and tension in these communities, and influenced the decision to attack and destroy the Baker–Fancher emigrant train near Mountain Meadows, Utah.

Leaving on August 3, 1857, Smith arrived at Parowan, Utah on August 8, 1857, and on August 15, he set off on a tour of the local military district manned by the Utah militia known as the Nauvoo Legion, led by stake president-Colonel William H. Dame. Although Smith's rank in the Legion was simply a private, one Parowan resident understood that part of the purpose of his trip was to represent the church leadership and to organize the regiment, inspect the troops, and provide instructions. During the tour, Smith gave military speeches and counseled Mormons that they should prepare to "touch fire to their homes, and hide themselves in the mountains, and to defend their country to the very last extremity." Smith instructed church members to stockpile grain, and not to sell it to emigrants or use it for animal feed.

In addition to Parowan, Smith's tour included visits to Cedar City and Santa Clara. The group stopped at Mountain Meadows to eat dinner on August 20 with a group of resident missionaries. Smith addressed a group of Indians in Santa Clara, counseling them that "the Americans" were approaching with a large army, and were a threat to the Indians as well as the Mormons. Riding in a wagon afterwards, John D. Lee said he warned Smith that the Indians would likely attack emigrant trains, and that Mormons were anxious to avenge the blood of the prophets, and according to Lee, Smith seemed pleased, and said "he had had a long talk with Major Haight on the same subject."

Isaac C. Haight, Cedar City stake president, and second in military command under Dame, met with Smith again on August 21. Haight told Smith he had heard reports that 600 troops were already approaching Cedar City from the East, and that if the rumors were true, Haight would have to act without waiting for instructions from Salt Lake City. Smith agreed, and "admired his grit". Smith later said he was uncomfortable, perhaps "on account of my extreme timidity", because some of the militia members were eager that "their enemies might come and give them a chance to fight and take vengeance for the cruelties that had been inflicted upon us in the States", such as the Haun's Mill massacre, where 18 Mormons were killed in 1838 in a skirmish with the Missouri militia during the Mormon War.

On the way back to Salt Lake City, Smith was accompanied by a party including Jacob Hamblin of Santa Clara, a newly appointed Mormon missionary to the Natives in the region who also ran a federally funded "Indian farm" next to Mountain Meadows. Also traveling north with the Smith party were several Native chiefs of the southern Utah Territory.

On August 25, 1857, Smith's group camped next to the Fancher–Baker party, headed the opposite direction, at Corn Creek, now Kanosh. Smith later said he had no knowledge of the Baker–Fancher party prior to meeting them on the trail. When the Baker–Fancher party inquired about places to stop for water and grazing, Hamblin directed them to Mountain Meadows, near the "Indian farm" there, a regular stopover on the Old Spanish Trail.

== Plural marriage ==
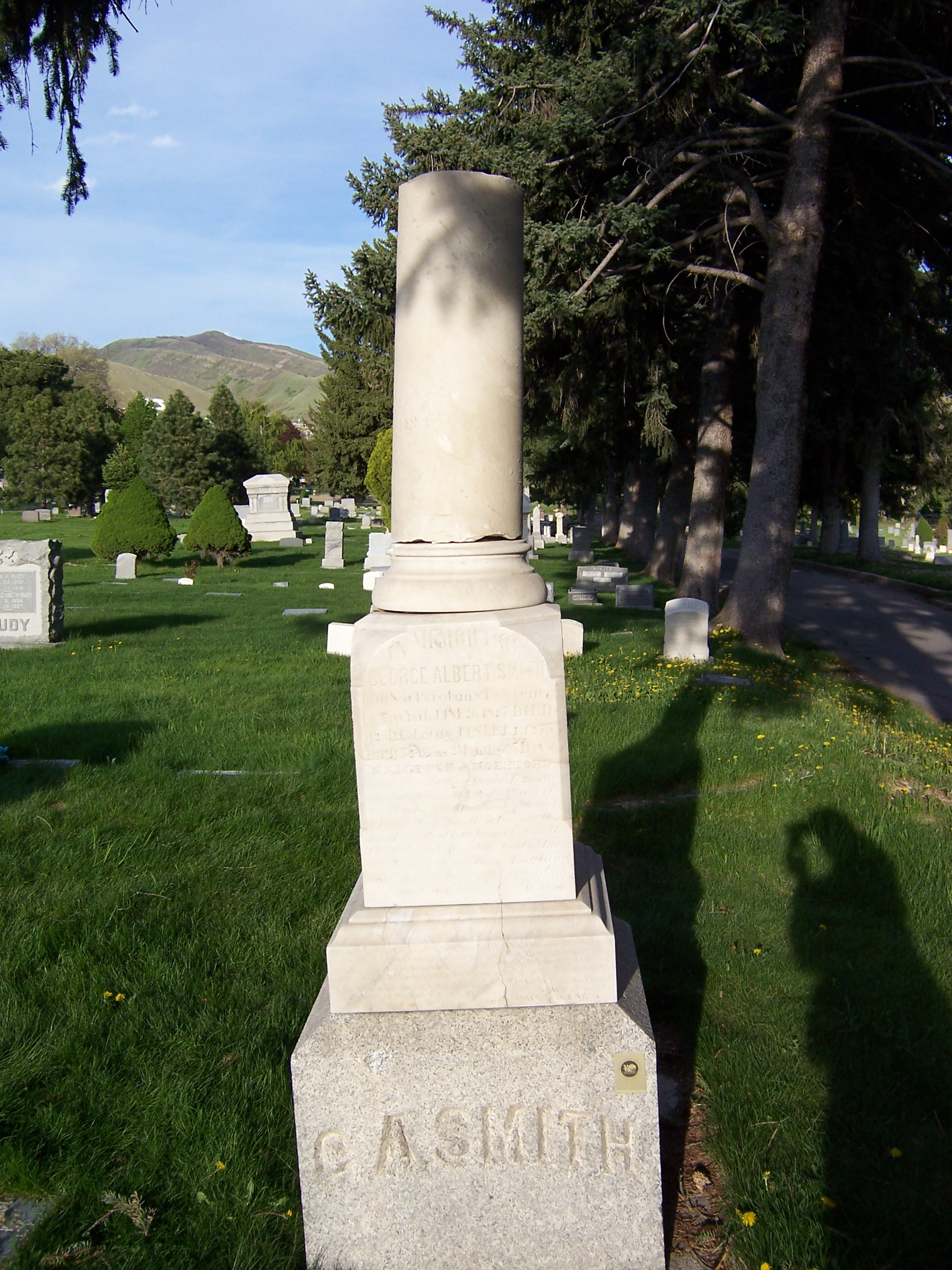
Grave marker of George A. Smith

Like many other 19th-century Mormon leaders, Smith practiced plural marriage. Known for his somewhat bombastic speaking style, Smith once said, "We breathe the free air, we have the best looking men and handsomest women, and if [non-Mormons] envy us our position, well they may, for they are a poor, narrow-minded, pinch-backed race of men, who chain themselves down to the law of monogamy, and live all their days under the dominion of one wife. They ought to be ashamed of such conduct, and the still fouler channel which flows from their practices; and it is not to be wondered at that they should envy those who so much better understand the social relations."

In addition to his first wife Bathsheba, Smith married Lucy Smith, Nancy Clement, Sarah Ann Libby, Hannah Maria Libby, Zilpha Stark, and Susan E. West. His wives bore him 20 children, 11 of whom were still living when Smith died.

== Physical characteristics ==
Smith was a portly man at 5 feet 10 inches (1.78 m) and at least 250 pounds (110 kg). He was humorously known for sometimes removing his wig to wipe his brow while preaching. After seeing Smith remove his hair, glasses, and false teeth, Paiutes gave him the name Non-choko-wicher, or "takes himself apart".

== Death ==
Smith died in Salt Lake City, Utah Territory, and was buried at the Salt Lake City Cemetery.

Smith's name is listed as one of the original pioneers on Cyrus Dallin's Brigham Young Monument in Temple Square.

== Notes ==
The Church of Jesus Christ of Latter-day Saints titles
| Preceded by Heber C. Kimball | First Counselor in the First Presidency; October 7, 1868 – September 1, 1875 | Succeeded by John W. Young |
Church of Jesus Christ of Latter Day Saints titles Later renamed: The Church of Jesus Christ of Latter-day Saints (1844)
| Preceded by Wilford Woodruff | Quorum of the Twelve Apostles; April 26, 1839 – October 7, 1868 | Succeeded by Orson Hyde |
