= List of Mormon cartoonists =

This is an alphabetized list of Mormon Cartoonists. It includes any notable comic artist who was baptized into the Church of Jesus Christ of Latter-day Saints (LDS Church), even if they are now inactive or not members.

- Mike Allred, comic book artist and writer (Madman)
- Jeanette Atwood, cartoonist and animator
- Pat Bagley, editorial cartoonist and journalist for The Salt Lake Tribune
- Steve Benson, Pulitzer Prize-winning editorial cartoonist for The Arizona Republic
- Richard Comely, comic book artist and letterer (Captain Canuck)
- Brian Crane, comic artist (Pickles (comic strip)
- Ric Estrada, comic book artist for DC Comics
- Kevin Fagan, newspaper comic artist and creator of Drabble
- Floyd Gottfredson, Mickey Mouse comic strip
- John Held Jr., cartoonist and illustrator (The New Yorker)
- Tyler Kirkham, comic illustrator (New Avengers/Transformers; Green Lantern: New Guardians)
- Adam Koford, Disney story artist, webcomic artist (Laugh-Out-Loud Cats), and frequent contributor to The Friend
- Brittany Long Olsen, writer and artist of Dendō
- James A. Owen, comic book illustrator and author (Starchild)
- Jake Parker, comic creator, illustrator, and animator (Missile Mouse)
- Todd Robert Petersen, writer and artist
- Annie Poon, webcomic writer and stop-motion animator
- Amy Reeder, (Fool's Gold, Madame Xanadu)
- Ed Roth, cartoonist and illustrator (Rat Fink)
- Howard Tayler, web comic artist (Schlock Mercenary)
- Brad Teare, comic book artist (Cypher)
- Ethan Van Sciver (Green Lantern: Rebirth)
- Noah Van Sciver, independent American cartoonist (grew up Mormon and addresses Mormon history in his comics)

== See also ==
- Portrayal of Mormons in comics
