= Joyce Chin =

American comic book artist

Joyce Chin is an American comic book artist. She has created content under the Marvel Comics, DC Comics, Dynamite Comics, Image Comics, Dark Horse Comics, and IDW Publishing labels. A large portion of Chin's work has been in creating comic book covers.

== Career ==
Chin's early work with DC began with Guy Gardner Warrior. She later progressed to work on a number of variant covers, mini-series, and special projects, including Xena: Warrior Princess, Vampirella, Tomb Raider, Red Sonja, and Wynonna Earp, among others. Her collaborations include work alongside her husband Arthur Adams, comic writer Gail Simone, and frequent cover art projects with Ivan Nunes.

== Style ==
Chin's work on Vampirella has been described as similar in style to that seen in Mucha paintings. Her depictions of superheroes and warriors has been grounded in her belief that costumes need to match the attitude of the characters wearing them.

== Personal life ==
Chin is married to fellow comics artist Arthur Adams, whom she met at the 1996 San Diego Comic-Con. The two have inked each other's pencils. As of 1997 they lived in Portland, Oregon. They later moved to San Francisco, California, before settling in Walnut Creek.

In March 2019, while at a Chicago airport during her journey to the Chicago Comic & Entertainment Expo, Chin suffered a subarachnoid hemorrhage, or stroke, resulting from a brain aneurysm, and broke an ankle during the fall that followed her loss of consciousness. Following emergency brain surgery on March 22 Chin told Bleeding Cool that she suffered no loss of cognitive or motor functioning. A GoFundMe page was set up to help defray her medical bills, while Dynamite Entertainment announced it would release a lithograph of Chin's artwork that served as the cover of Vampirella #20 in 2001, in order to raise additional funds. Any surplus funds would go to the Hero Initiative charity.

== Awards ==
Chin received an Inkpot Award at San Diego Comic-Con in 2017.

== Bibliography ==
- Action Comics #820, (December 2004), Cover (with Art Adams), (DC Comics)
- Alice Cooper Vs. Chaos! #1 (August 2016), Cover, (Dynamite Entertainment)
- Alice Cooper Vs. Chaos! #2, (October 2015), Regular Cover (with Ivan Nunes), Retailer Incentive "Black & White" Cover, and "Virgin Art" Edition Cover (with Ivan Nunes), (Dynamite Entertainment)
- Alice Cooper Vs. Chaos! #3, (November 2015), Regular Cover (with Ivan Nunes), Retailer Incentive "Black & White" Cover, and "Virgin Art" Edition Cover (with Ivan Nunes), (Dynamite Entertainment)
- Alice Cooper Vs. Chaos! #4, (December 2015), Regular Cover (with Ivan Nunes), Retailer Incentive "Black & White" Cover, and "Virgin Art" Edition Cover (with Ivan Nunes), (Dynamite Entertainment)
- Alice Cooper Vs. Chaos! #5, (January 2016), Regular Cover (with Ivan Nunes), Retailer Incentive "Black & White" Cover, and "Virgin Art" Edition Cover (with Ivan Nunes), (Dynamite Entertainment)
- Alice Cooper Vs. Chaos! #6, (February 2016), Regular Cover (with Ivan Nunes), Retailer Incentive "Black & White" Cover, and "Virgin Art" Edition Cover (with Ivan Nunes), (Dynamite Entertainment)
- All-New Wolverine #9, (August 2016), "Civil War" Variant Cover (with Nei Ruffino), Marvel Comics)
- All-New Wolverine #14, (January 2017), Divided We Stand Variant Cover (with Chris Sotomayor), Marvel Comics)
- The All New Exiles #8, (May 1996), Cover, Penciler, (Malibu Comics)
- The Art of Red Sonja #1 (January 2011), Artist, (Dynamite Entertainment)
- Battlezones: Dream Team #1, (March 1996), Inker, Penciler, Marvel Comics)
- Black Panther #18, (November 2017), Venomized Villains Variant Cover (with Andrew Crossley), Marvel Comics)
- Chastity: Re-imagined #1, (July 2002), Cover (with Amanda Conner, Atomic Paintbrush, and Jimmy Palmiotti), (Chaos! Comics)
- Dark Horse Presents Annual 1999, (August 1999), Cover (with Christian Zanier, Mike Mignola, Paul Chadwick, Phillip Norwood, Sergio Aragonés, Shannon Eric Denton, Stan Sakai, and Walden Wong), (Dark Horse Comics)
- Deadpool the Duck #5 (May 2017), Variant Cover (with Rachelle Rosenberg) Marvel Comics)
- Evil Ernie #3, (January 2015), Subscription Cover, (Dynamite Entertainment)
- Evil Ernie #4, (February 2015), Subscription Cover (with Ivan Nunes), (Dynamite Entertainment)
- Evil Ernie #5, (March 2015), Subscription Cover (with Ivan Nunes), (Dynamite Entertainment)
- Evil Ernie #6, (April 2015), Subscription Cover (with Ivan Nunes), (Dynamite Entertainment)
- The Fantastic Four 100 Project #1, (November 2012), Artist, (Hero Initiative)
- Gatecrasher #5, (December 2000), Artist, (Black Bull Comics)
- Green Lantern 80-Page Giant #3, (August 2000), (DC Comics)
- Guy Gardner Annual #1, (June 1995), Cover, (DC Comics)
- Guy Gardner: Warrior Annual #1, (January 1995), Cover (with Dan Panosian), (DC Comics)
- Guy Gardner: Warrior #31, (June 1995), Penciler, (DC Comics)
- Guy Gardner: Warrior #32, (July 1995), Penciler, (DC Comics)
- Guy Gardner: Warrior #35, (October 1995), Penciler, (DC Comics)
- Guy Gardner: Warrior #42, (May 1996), Cover (with Dan Panosian and Scott Baumann), Penciler, (DC Comics)
- Hellchild Inferno One-Shot (March 2018), Cover A (with Ceci de la Cruz) (Zenescope Entertainment)
- Heroes of Power: The Women of Marvel - All-New Marvel Treasury Edition #1 (December 2016), Cover, Marvel Comics)
- Hero Premiere Edition #5, (1993), Colorist, (Warrior Publications)
- Hulk Team-Up #1, (November 2009), Penciler, Marvel Comics)
- Justice League America #101, (July 1995), Penciler, (DC Comics)
- Lady Death: Re-Imagined #1, (July 2002), Cover (with Al Rio, Christian Gossett, and Hi-Fi), (Chaos! Comics)
- Lady Demon #1, (December 2014), Cover A, Retailer Incentive "Black & White" Cover, and "Blood Red" Cover, (Dynamite Entertainment)
- Lady Demon #2, (February 2015), Regular Cover (with Ivan Nunes), Retailer Incentive "Black & White" Cover, and Limited Edition "Red" Cover, (Dynamite Entertainment)
- Lady Demon #3, (March 2015), Regular Cover (with Ivan Nunes) and Retailer Incentive "Black & White" Cover, (Dynamite Entertainment)
- Lady Demon #4, (April 2015), Regular Cover (with Ivan Nunes) and Retailer Incentive "Black & White" Cover, (Dynamite Entertainment)
- Lady Rawhide/Lady Zorro #4, (July 2015), Regular Cover (with Ivan Nunes), Retailer Incentive "Black & White" Cover and High-End "Blood Red" Cover, (Dynamite Entertainment)
- Lady Rawhide/Lady Zorro #2, (April 2015), Regular Cover (with Ivan Nunes), Retailer Incentive "Black & White" Cover, and Limited Edition "Blood Red" Cover, (Dynamite Entertainment)
- Lady Rawhide/Lady Zorro #3, (June 2015), Regular Cover (with Ivan Nunes), Retailer Incentive "Black & White" Cover, and Ultra-Limited "Red" Variant, (Dynamite Entertainment)
- Legionnaires #28, (August 1995), Penciler, (DC Comics)
- Legionnaires #2 (May 2018), Penciler (DC Comics)
- Mantra: Infinity #Infinity, (September 1995), Penciler, (Malibu Comics)
- Marvel Comics Presents #5, (January 2008), Artist, Marvel Comics)
- Marvel Comics Presents #6, (February 2008), Artist, Marvel Comics)
- Marvel Comics Presents #7, (March 2008), Artist, Marvel Comics)
- Marvel Swimsuit Special #4, (1995), Artist, Marvel Comics)
- Mighty Thor #6, (June 2016), "Civil War" Variant Cover (with Laura Martin), Marvel Comics)
- Mighty Thor #22, (October 2017), Marvel vs. Capcom Infinite Variant Cover (with Rachelle Rosenberg), Marvel Comics)
- Monster War #1, (May 2005), Cover (with Eric Basaldua, Joe Weems, Joseph Michael Linsner, Marc Silvestri, Rick Basaldua, Scott Kester, Steve Firchow, and Tom Sniegoski), Penciler, (Top Cow Productions)
- Monster War #2, (July 2005), Cover (with Eric Basaldua, Rick Basaldua, Scott Kester, and Tyson Wengler), Penciler, (Top Cow Productions)
- Monster War #3, (August 2005), Cover (with Blond, Eric Basaldua, Rob Hunter), (Top Cow Productions)
- Monster War #4, (September 2005), Cover (with Chad Fidler, Eric Basaldua, Jeff De Los Santos, and Scott Kester), (Top Cow Productions)
- Moon Girl and Devil Dinosaur #13, (January 2017), STEAM (Science Technology Engineering Art & Math) Variant Cover (with Chris Sotomayor), Marvel Comics)
- More Fund Comics #1, (September 2003), Artist, (Sky-Dog Press)
- Mosaic #3 (February 2017), XCI Variant Cover, Marvel Comics)
- Ms. Marvel #13, (January 2017), Divided We Stand Variant Cover (with Chris Sotomayor), Marvel Comics)
- New Avengers 100 Project #1, (January 2011), Cover, Marvel Comics)
- Night Tribes #1, (May 1999), Cover, Penciler, (WildStorm)
- The Official Handbook of the Invincible Universe #1, (November 2007), Penciler, (Image Comics)
- The Official Handbook of the Invincible Universe #2, (January 2007), Artist, (Image Comics)
- Tomorrow Stories Book 2 #2, (January 2004), Artist, (WildStorm)
- Top Cow Preview #1, (March 2005), Artist, (Top Cow Productions)
- Patsy Walker, A.K.A. Hellcat! #10, (November 2016), The Defenders Variant Cover (with Frank D'Armata), Marvel Comics)
- Peter Parker: Spider-Man / Elektra '98 #1, (October 1998), Penciler, Marvel Comics)
- Purgatori #1, (September 2014), Variant Cover A (with Ivan Nunes) and "Virgin Art" Edition Cover, (Dynamite Entertainment)
- Purgatori #2, (October 2014), Variant Cover (with Ivan Nunes), Retailer Incentive "Black & White" Cover, "Virgin Art" Cover, and Second Printing Cover, (Dynamite Entertainment)
- Purgatori #3, (November 2014), Variant Cover A (with Ivan Nunes), Retailer Incentive Cover "Black & White" Cover, and "Virgin Art" Cover, (Dynamite Entertainment)
- Purgatori #4, (December 2014), Variant Cover (with Ivan Nunes), Retailer Incentive "Black & White" Cover, and "Virgin Art" Cover, (Dynamite Entertainment)
- Purgatori #5, (January 2015), Variant Cover (with Ivan Nunes), Retailer Incentive "Black & White" Cover, and "Virgin Art" Cover, (Dynamite Entertainment)
- Red Sonja #23, (June 2007), Cover (with Gregory Homs, Joe Prado, and Stephen Segovia), (Dynamite Entertainment)
- Red Sonja #50, (June 2010), Artist, (Dynamite Entertainment)
- Red Sonja #12 (September 2014), Variant Cover and Retailer Incentive "Black & White" Cover, (Dynamite Entertainment)
- Rose #3 (June 2017), Variant Cover B (Image Comics)
- Savage Tales #3, (August 2007), Artist, (Dynamite Entertainment)
- Secret Empire: Brave New World #1 (August 2017), Stan Lee Collectibles Exclusive Variant Cover (with Rachelle Rosenberg) Marvel Comics)
- Spider-Man #3, (June 2016), "Civil War" Variant Cover, Marvel Comics)
- Superman/Batman #26, (June 2006), Inker, Penciler, (DC Comics)
- Superman: In the Name of Gog #1, (December 2005), Cover (with Arthur Adams), (DC Comics)
- Superman: Silver Banshee #1, (December 1998), Artist, (DC Comics)
- Superman: Silver Banshee #2, (January 1999), Artist, (DC Comics)
- Superman Villains: Secret Files & Origins #1, (June 1998), Penciler, (DC Comics)
- Super Ego: Family Matters #1 (June 2014), Artist, (Magnetic Press)
- Swords of Sorrow #1 (May 2015), Retailer Incentive Cover (with Ivan Nunes) and Limited Edition "Virgin Art" Cover, (Dynamite Entertainment)
- Swords of Sorrow: Black Sparrow & Lady Zorro #1 (June 2015), Cover, (Dynamite Entertainment)
- Swords of Sorrow: Chaos! Prequel #1 (May 2015), Cover, (Dynamite Entertainment)
- Thundercats Sourcebook #1, (January 2003), Artist, (WildStorm)
- Tomb Raider: Sphere of Influence #1, (January 2004), Artist, (Top Cow Productions)
- Tomorrow Stories #11, (October 2001), Inker, Penciler, (America's Best Comics)
- Vampirella #20, (2003), Cover (with Amanda Conner, Haberlin Studios, and Jimmy Palmiotti), (Harris Comics)
- Vampirella #100 (January 2015), Variant Cover (with Ivan Nunes), (Dynamite Entertainment)
- Vampirella Comics Magazine #7, (October 2004), Artist, (Harris Comics)
- Vampirella: Feary Tales #5 (February 2015), Variant Cover (with Ivan Nunes), 1:25 Retailer Incentive "Black & White" Cover, and FOC "Red" Cover, (Dynamite Entertainment)
- Vampirella Quarterly: Winter 2008 #1, (March 2008), Cover (with Al Rio, Matt Haley, and Michael Kelleher), (Harris Comics)
- Vampirella/Witchblade: The Feast #1, (2005), Artist, Inker, Cover (with Amanda Conner, Justin Gray, and Tone Rodriguez), (Harris Comics)
- Wildstorm Universe '97 Sourcebook #3, (January 1997), Artist, (WildStorm)
- Witchblade/The Magdalena/ Vampirella #1, (June 2004), Cover, Inker, Penciler, (Top Cow Productions)
- Witchblade / Vampirella / The Magdalena / Lara Croft Tomb Raider #1, (August 2005), Inker, Penciler, Cover (with Arthur Adams, Billy Tan, and Beth Sotelo), (Top Cow Productions)
- Witch Hunter #1, (1996), Cover, Penciler, (Malibu Comics)
- Wolverine: Weapon X 100 Project #1, (December 2009), Artist, Marvel Comics)
- Wynonna Earp #1, (December 1996), Cover (with Jim Lee), Penciler, (Image Comics)
- Wynonna Earp #2, (January 1997), Cover, Penciler, (Image Comics)
- Wynonna Earp #3, (February 1997), Cover (with Mark Irwin), Penciler, (Image)
- Wynonna Earp #4, (March 1997), Cover (with Mark Irwin), Penciler, (Image Comics)
- Wynonna Earp #5, (April 1997), Cover (with Mark Irwin), Penciler, (Image Comics)
- Wynonna Earp #1 (October 2013), Artist, (IDW Publishing)
- Wynonna Earp: Strange Inheritance #1 (April 2016), Penciler, (IDW Publishing)
- Xena: Warrior Princess #1, (September 1999), Penciler, (Dark Horse Comics)
- Xena: Warrior Princess #2, (October 1999), Penciler, (Dark Horse Comics)
- Xena: Warrior Princess #4, (December 1999), Penciler, Cover (with Arthur Adams and Dave Stewart), (Dark Horse Comics)
- Xena: Warrior Princess #2, (September 1997), Penciler, (Topps Comics)
- Xena: Warrior Princess #1 (August 1997), Penciler, (Topps Comics)
- Xena: Warrior Princess: Classic Years Omnibus #1 (June 2017), Artist (with Ivan Reis, Fabiano Neves, Clint Hilinksi, Mike Deodato Jr., and Davide Fabbri) (Dynamite Entertainment)
- X-Men '92 #2, (June 2016), Variant Cover, Marvel Comics)
- 1001 Arabian Nights: The Adventures of Sinbad #11, (July 2010), Cover (with Jason Embury, Talent Caldwell, and Tom Smith), (Zenescope Entertainment)
