= Rocket Girl (disambiguation) =

Rocket Girl or Rocket Girls in plural may refer to:

- Rocket Girl, London-based independent record label
- Rocket Girl, 2011 song by South Korean band Stellar
- Rocket Girl (comics), 2013 comic book series.
- Rocket Girl a play and a biography about Mary Sherman Morgan
- Rocket Girl (Doc Walker song), song by Canadian band Doc Walker from their 2001 album Curve
- Rocket Girls (novel series), Japanese light novel written by Hōsuke Nojiri
- Rocket Girls 101, a Chinese girl group
- Rocket Girls (NASA), NASA group

- Rise of the Rocket Girls: The Women Who Propelled Us, from Missiles to the Moon to Mars, a book by Nathalia Holt on women who did computations for JPL in its early days.
