= Latter Day Saints in popular culture =

Latter Day Saints and Mormons have been portrayed in popular media many times. These portrayals often emphasize controversial subjects from the history and beliefs of the Church of Jesus Christ of Latter-day Saints (LDS Church) and other branches of the Latter Day Saint movement.

== Overview ==
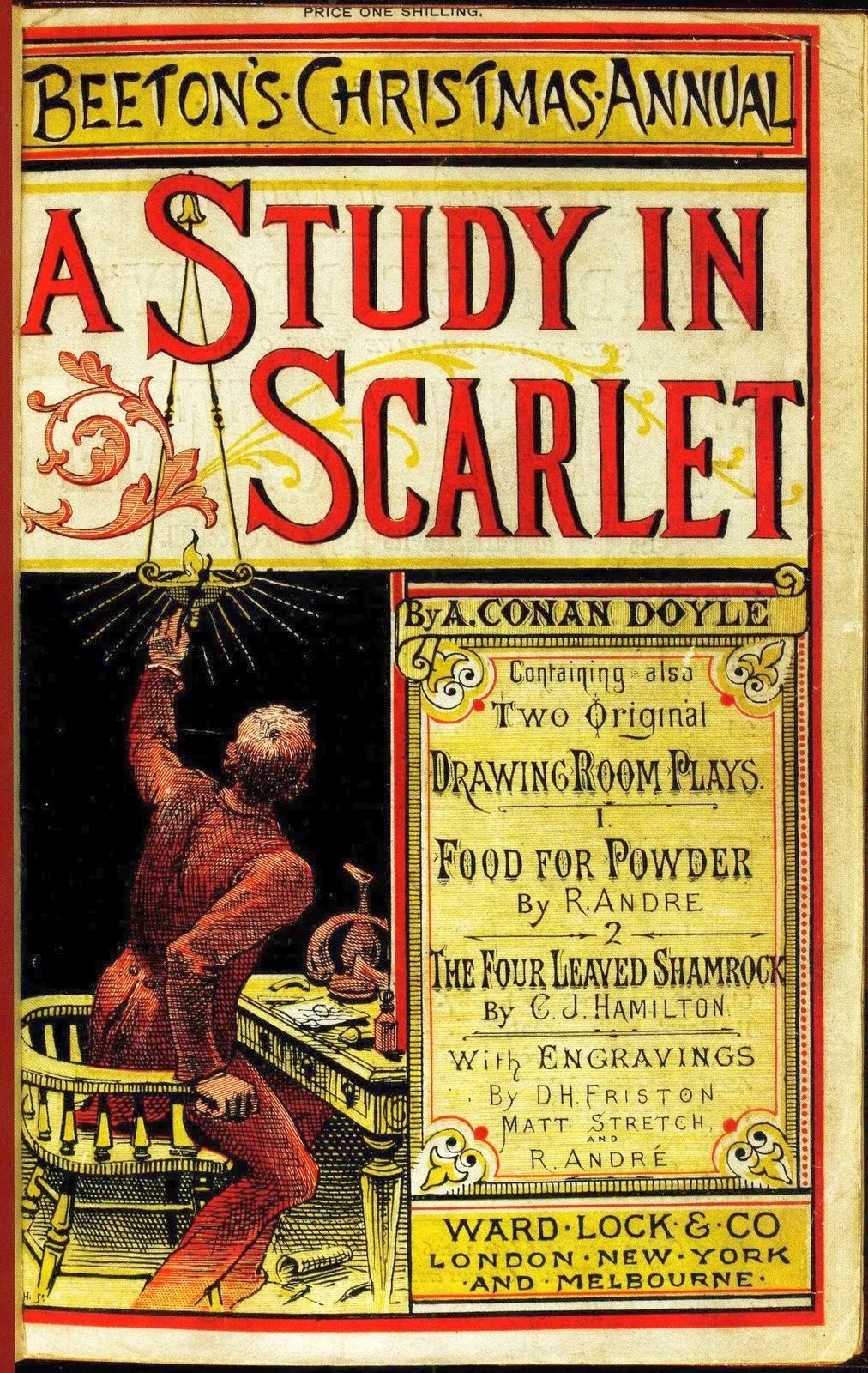
The second half of the story, The Country of the Saints, is set in the United States and includes an appearance by Brigham Young.

=== Controversial, negative portrayals ===
Portrayals of Mormons and of Mormonism in both literature and movies have drawn criticism, with critics such as d'Arc describing the bulk of what the world heard of Mormons in the 19th and early-20th centuries, via the literature of the day, as "polygamy, mystic revelations to modern prophets, golden bibles, and scheming missionaries adding continually to their harem of wives", and stating that this portrayal found its way into movies.

==== In 19th-century literature ====
Two examples of 19th century books that incorporate the images d'Arc complained about are:

Jules Verne's classic novel Around the World in Eighty Days (1873) references a "Mormon Elder" who launches into a diatribe about his religion in a rail car where passenger Passepartout becomes a captive audience. Verne follows the 19th-century propensity to view polygamy as central to Mormonism, going so far as to call it, "the sole basis of the religion."

Arthur Conan Doyle's detective novel A Study in Scarlet (1887) is another portrayal that caused controversy. Mormons viewed the portrayal of the Danites in the book as highly erroneous, being yet another instance of anti-Mormon antagonism in popular media. Conan Doyle, according to his daughter, had relied upon what had been published about Mormons by former Mormons (historians believe these probably to be Fannie Stenhouse, William A. Hickman, William Jarman, John Hyde, and Ann Eliza Young), believing those accounts to be factual. Conan Doyle visited the United States in 1923, and one leg of his lecture tour took him to the University of Utah, to lecture on spiritualism. During his stay he received a letter from a Dr. G. Hodgson Higgins, who had formed his impressions of Mormonism based upon the portrayal in A Study in Scarlet, which "gave the impression that murder was a common practice among them", and who suggested that Conan Doyle "express his regret at having propagated falsehoods about the Mormon Church and people". Conan Doyle refused to withdraw what he had written about the Danites and the murders, on the grounds that it was a matter of historical record, but stated that his treatment in the novel was more "lurid" than the treatment by a history textbook would have been, and promised that in the future his portrayals of the Latter-day Saints would be based upon his firsthand experience of them on his visit. Subsequent Mormon characters in Conan Doyle's work were indeed more sympathetic.

==== In 20th-century films ====
D'Arc gives two examples of the films from 1905 to 1936 that incorporate the images he complained about: the Danish film A Victim of the Mormons (1911), wherein a young Mormon missionary in Copenhagen lures the fiancée of a close friend to elope with him to Utah, whereupon he locks her in his basement (a film whose showing Governor of Utah William Spry fought to prevent); and the film A Mormon Maid (1917), incorporating what d'Arc describes as "the innocent-daughter-catching-the-eye-of-powerful-Mormon-leader formula". D'Arc argues that the reason that such portrayals became sparse in the 1930s was the introduction of the Hays and later Breen regulatory codes, which sharply curtailed the portrayal of polygamy in movies.

=== Positive portrayals ===
Portrayals of Mormon characters in popular writing have not been universally viewed as negative by Mormons. For example:

The portrayals of Mormons in the work of Orson Scott Card, himself a Mormon, have been viewed as sympathetic of the Mormon world view that reach hundreds of thousands of readers worldwide, and thus that form a useful starting point for Mormons to explain Mormonism to non-Mormons. Similarly, the portrayals of Mormons and of Mormonism presented by Harold Bloom (extolling Mormonism as the quintessential American religion), Charles Dickens (describing the industrious, orderly nature of the Mormon emigrants he encountered on a ship leaving England), John Stuart Mill (using Mormon beliefs as test cases for his assertion that government should not interfere in the private lives of individuals), George Bernard Shaw (continuing Mill's argument describing Joseph Smith as "an authentic religious genius, unique in our national history"), and Wallace Stegner (in The Gathering of Zion) are all seen as sympathetic to Mormons.

=== Michael Austin's analysis of Mormon portrayals ===
Mormon literary critics, such as Michael Austin, consider the portrayal of Mormons in popular writing to have completely changed over the course of the 20th century, with the portrayal of Mormonism in the 19th century and at the beginning of the 20th century being that of "a harsh, theocratic, and conspiratorial frontier community" and "a sinister secret society bent on tracking down and destroying its enemies wherever in the world they tried to hide". At the time, Austin states that Mormons were icons of lawlessness, chaos, and sexual promiscuity, conceptions of Mormons and Mormonism that he views to have been incorporated into the works of Arthur Conan Doyle, Zane Grey, Jack London, Robert Louis Stevenson, Mark Twain, and even the made-for-TV movie The Avenging Angel (1995). The portrayal at the end of the 20th century, in works by writers from Tom Clancy to Tony Kushner, is described by Austin as being of people who are "hyperobedient, patriotic, conservative, and, in all probability, sexually repressed". He argues that although the portrayal has changed, its relation to mainstream society has not. In both cases, the portrayal of Mormons and Mormonism is highly distinct from the mainstream, he argues, with the 19th century portrayal being in stark contrast to the Victorian values of the time, and the late-20th century portrayal being ironically that of a "Victorian misfit in a promiscuous society". He argues that the role of Mormons and Mormonism in popular writing is "to establish a foil for the [mainstream] values supported in the text".

After a lengthy analysis of Mormon stereotypes in popular fiction, Austin draws the following conclusions:

- To the extent that popular literature is able to reflect popular sentiment, Mormons are not as well perceived in the larger American culture as most people would like to believe.
- Most of these negative images have been fixed since the 19th century.
- These stereotypes should not be confused with genuine political critique.
- By studying the way that Mormons are portrayed in popular genre fiction insight can be gained into the way that Mormonism functions as a category in American culture.

=== LGBTQ Latter Day Saint people in media ===
LGBT Mormon characters and themes have been featured in many films, plays, and pieces of literature, with some examples listed below.

- Films: Latter Days, G.B.F., and The Falls trilogy
- Documentaries: Believer, Mormon No More, 8: The Mormon Proposition, Same-Sex Attracted, My Husband's Not Gay, Transmormon, and Church and State
- TV series: Room 104, and The Catch
- Stage productions: Book of Mormon musical, Angels in America, 8, 14, Facing East, Confessions of a Mormon Boy, Bash: Latter-Day Plays, and Missa Solemnis or The Play About Henry
- Books: Advise and Consent

== In the 19th and 20th centuries ==
In addition to the works listed in the Overview, 19th and 20th-century literary and film portrayals of Mormons include:

=== Paint Your Wagon ===
- Paint Your Wagon (musical) (1951–1952) and its film adaptation Paint Your Wagon (film) (1969) include depictions of a Mormon elder auctioning off a polygamist wife.

=== Orgazmo ===
Orgazmo (1997) is an American satirical sex comedy film about a young Mormon who gets roped into making a pornographic movie while on a church mission in Los Angeles.

== In the 21st century ==
In the 21st century, positive portrayals of Mormons in popular media are still perceived by Mormons as rare; most portrayals are viewed as "usually just polygamy jokes for a cheap laugh, or the 'hip' thing nowadays—gay Mormon missionaries." Some examples of portrayals of LDS Church members in popular media are listed below.

=== Films ===
==== "New York Doll" ====
New York Doll an (2005) American documentary, details the history of both the New York Dolls and one of its members, Arthur "Killer" Kane. The film narrates the history of the band from its formation in 1972, through its drug problems and the deaths of several of its members. The central focus of the film, however, is Arthur's life after conversion to The Church of Jesus Christ of Latter-day Saints after struggles with alcoholism, drug abuse, an attempt at suicide, and a beating with a baseball bat.

==== Believer ====
Believer is an American documentary that examines the intersection between LGBT people and The Church of Jesus Christ of Latter-day Saints (LDS Church) through the eyes of Dan Reynolds of Imagine Dragons.

=== On Broadway ===
==== Angels in America: A Gay Fantasia on National Themes ====
In May 1991, Tony Kushner's complex, often metaphorical, and at times symbolic examination of AIDS and homosexuality in America in the 1980s, opened on Broadway entitled Angels in America: A Gay Fantasia on National Themes. The play has several storylines, some of which occasionally intersect. One of the featured storylines is that of, "Joe, a young Mormon lawyer, who has taken on the right-wing potentate and monster Roy Cohn as a mentor. Two gay men, neither willing to admit it (though Cohn has started to die of AIDS-related causes). Joe strikes up a friendship with gay Louis, and soon they are lovers; but though opposites may attract, they're still opposites. Says Louis: 'I can't believe I spent three weeks in bed with a Mormon.' After a drunken Joe calls his mother Hannah to say he's gay, she sells her Salt Lake City home and heads east to save him, while working as a volunteer in the Mormon Visitors' Center. Joe finally ends his affair by punching Louis during a fight." The work won numerous awards, including the Pulitzer Prize for Drama, the Tony Award for Best Play, and the Drama Desk Award for Outstanding Play. The play was later created as a 2003 American HBO miniseries, by the same name. The miniseries starred actors, Al Pacino, Meryl Streep, Patrick Wilson, Mary-Louise Parker, and Emma Thompson.

==== The Book of Mormon musical ====
In March 2011, a religious satire musical opened on Broadway entitled The Book of Mormon. Conceived by Trey Parker, Matt Stone, and Robert Lopez, the play tells the story of two young Mormon missionaries sent to a remote village in northern Uganda, where a brutal warlord is threatening the local population. Naive and optimistic, the two missionaries try to share their scriptures—which only one of them knows very well—but have trouble connecting with the locals, who are worried about famine, poverty, and AIDS. The Guardian reported the play was "not a problem" for the LDS Church because they were, "made of sterner stuff".

=== Television ===
==== Big Love ====
The HBO show Big Love stars Bill Paxton as Bill Henrickson, a modern-day polygamist who lives in suburban Salt Lake City with his three wives and seven children. Reviewer Maureen Ryan notes that the show makes it clear the Henricksons are "no longer active members of the Mormon Church," although other commentators have simply described the Henricksons as a "Mormon family" and left it to others to draw the distinction. The show has caused controversy, with Mormons and LDS Church leaders reacting to what they perceive as being a veiled stereotype. The LDS Church released an official statement saying:

The Church has long been concerned about the continued illegal practice of polygamy, and, in particular, about reports of child and wife abuse emanating from polygamous communities today. It will be regrettable if this program, by making polygamy the subject of entertainment, minimizes the seriousness of the problem. Placing the series in Salt Lake City, the international headquarters of The Church of Jesus Christ of Latter-day Saints, is enough to blur the line between the modern Church and the program's subject matter, and to reinforce old and long-outdated stereotypes. Big Love, like so much other television programming, is essentially lazy and indulgent entertainment that does nothing for our society and will never nourish great minds.

HBO defended its show, asserting that its portrayal of the characters as outside of the LDS Church and continually having to hide their status from other people actually helps to educate non-Mormons about Mormonism, with Carolyn Strauss, president of HBO Entertainment, saying:

It is interesting how many people are ignorant about the Mormon church and think that the Mormon church actually does condone polygamy. So in an odd way, the show is sort of beneficial in drawing that distinction.

The show again hit a sensitive spot when, in 2009, it recreated a temple ceremony that members of the church consider to be sacred. The creators deemed it "a very important part of the story" and made it clear that they were going to air the episode as planned after apologizing for offending anyone. The church's response to the news about the ceremony stated that as an institution, they would not call for a boycott. Also, it stated that despite assurances three years ago from HBO and the creators of Big Love that the show was not about Mormons, Mormon themes and increasingly unsympathetic characters were being woven into the show.

==== The Catch ====
In a brief scene in the 2017 show The Catch a pair of male missionaries exit a bedroom getting dressed and kiss a man and a woman, and the man thanks them for giving him a copy of The Book of Mormon.

==== Cold Case ====
The portrayal of Mormons in Cold Case has also drawn criticism from Chris Hicks for being disrespectful. He has stated that the program is an example of the unequal treatment of Mormons, stating that where insane people of other religions are portrayed in television drama, pains are taken to point out as part of the plot that they are "non-practicing", yet no such pains are taken when it comes to Mormons. As a result, the faith is seen as directly related to the insanity of one character with the implication being that all Mormons are strange people. He also expressed concerns that the temple garments of Mormons did not receive the same sympathetic dramatic treatment or respect as do the sacred symbols of other religions.

==== Dexter ====
In season 6, episode 10 of the popular series Dexter, there is a reference to Mormonism connecting it to a radicalized end of days killer. The entire season focuses on religious symbols. In this episode, Angel Batista notices a bookcase full of fictional covers of the suspect Dr. Gellar's books dealing with the end of days. Among them is the third volume of the early Mormon historical fiction series The Work and the Glory, subtitled "Truth Will Prevail".

==== Mrs Brown's Boys ====
Irish hit series, Mrs. Brown's Boys features an episode about religion in which the Mormon missionaries turn up at her house and discuss religion. She mistakes them for undertakers, and holds them "hostage" for a couple of hours.

==== Psych ====
In Season 6, Episode 9 of Psych, girls sporting Brigham Young University (BYU) shirts are seen entering a bar. This caused controversy because students at BYU, owned by the LDS Church, do not drink alcohol.

==== South Park ====
Commentators have been surprised by the comparatively positive portrayal of Latter-day Saints in South Park. Mormon commentators have described it as "unexpectedly, our best treatment". In South Park, despite the fact that Mormon characters are "generally pollyannas with bike helmets and missionary tags", and an entire episode, "All About Mormons", is devoted to lampooning Joseph Smith and the founding of the religion, the portrayal is considered to be generally positive. In the episode "Super Best Friends", Smith is portrayed positively, appearing in a Super Friends parody involving other religious figures who are allied in the fight against David Blaine. In the episode "Probably", it is only the Mormons who "got it right" and who go to heaven after death and all adherents of other religions go to hell, though this "reversal of fortune" is likely just a literary device for giving debates of religious salvation a humorously ironic twist, rather than a meaningful endorsement of Mormonism. Mormon characters in the series are the only ones who commentators view to be "consistently compassionate, or even courteous".

==== Hell on Wheels ====
Hell on Wheels seasons 3 and 4 prominently feature Mormons as both antagonists and secondary characters. Hell on Wheels follows the building of the Transcontinental railroad, much of which was built through Mormon territory. Brigham Young (portrayed by Gregg Henry) also appears in multiple episodes throughout the third, fourth, and fifth seasons.

==== Messiah ====
In the Netflix thriller Messiah, the US President, John Young (Dermot Mulroney), is a Latter-day Saint. al-Masih (Mehdi Dehbi), a messianic figure claiming to be the Messiah, cites the LDS belief in continuous revelation to attempt to convince the president to withdrawal US troops from around the world, claiming that it will bring about world peace. al-Masih also quotes the Doctrine and Covenants.

"Let me ask you this. Do you call yourself a Latter-day Saint?... Do you believe in God?...these are the latter days?... Do you believe God would go silent, that he would abandon you? Or do you believe he still speaks to humanity?... He's speaking to you now. — —al-Masih (Mehdi Dehbi) to President John Young (Dermot Mulroney)

==== Heretic ====
In the 2024 film Heretic, two sister missionaries (played by Chloe East and Sophie Thatcher, both of whom were raised in Mormonism) knock on the door of Hugh Grant's character, Mr. Reed, in hopes of converting him to Mormonsism. After inviting the missionaries in, Reed debates them on their religious beliefs, subsequently becoming increasingly violent, including locking them in the basement and killing one of them. Following the film's release, the LDS Church released a statement condemning the film's portrayal of violence against women. A number of former Latter-day Saints praised the film as a realistic and nuanced portrayal of missionaries.

=== Videogames ===
==== Fallout ====
In Fallout, a video game series set in post-nuclear war America, Mormons are portrayed as one of the last pre-existing religions to survive the apocalypse (with the majority of religions featured in the series being fictitious). One of the biggest and most powerful Mormon controlled towns is New Canaan, built on the ruins of Ogden, Utah. Mormons are featured heavily in Fallout: New Vegas expansion "Honest Hearts", wherein their missionaries are spreading the religion to tribals in Zion National Park and teaching them to defend themselves against neighboring tribes and Caesars Legion, a totalitarian slaver society co-founded by Joshua Graham, one of the Mormon missionaries now turned against Caesar.

== See also ==
- LDS cinema
- Media bias
- Mormonism and Nicene Christianity
- Mountain Meadows massacre and the media
- Public relations of The Church of Jesus Christ of Latter-day Saints
- Portrayal of Mormons in comics
