= Gatecrasher (comics) =

Gatecrasher, in comics, may refer to:

- Gatecrasher (Marvel Comics), a Marvel Comics character and leader of Technet
- Gatecrasher (Black Bull Entertainment), the first title from Black Bull Entertainment

== See also ==
- Gatecrasher (disambiguation)
