= Xena: Warrior Princess (comics) =

American comic book series

Xena
- Cover of Xena: Warrior Princess 0 (Oct 1997)

Character information
- First appearance: Hercules: The Legendary Journeys #3 (August 1996)

In-story information
- Full name: Xena

Publication information
- Publisher: Topps Comics; Dark Horse Comics; Dynamite Entertainment
- Schedule: Monthly
- Formats: Original material for the series has been published as a set of ongoing series and limited series.
- Genre: Action/adventureFantasy; Based on TV; Mythology
- Publication date: October 1997 – 2019
- Number of issues: 55
- Main character(s): Xena, Gabrielle

Reprints
- Collected editions
- The Warrior Way of Death: ISBN 1-56971-452-5
- Xena: Contest of Pantheons: ISBN 1-933305-35-5

Xena: Warrior Princess is a series of comic books based on the television series of the same name. Topps Comics and Dark Horse Comics created a series of comics tying into the property. In 2007, Dynamite Entertainment acquired the rights to the series.

== Publication history ==
Topps Comics published the first Xena series of comics, titled Xena: Warrior Princess. Xena's character was originally introduced in the 1996 Topps Comics series Hercules: The Legendary Journeys, issues #3, #4, and #5. These were followed by the Xena: Warrior Princess comics released in a limited series format, with the vast majority being three-issue series, in 1997 and 1998.

Dark Horse acquired the license in 1999.

Dynamite Entertainment began new stories in 2007.

There have been a number of crossovers with other properties within the companies, including three mini-series with Army of Darkness: "Why Not?", "What, Again?", and "Forever and a Day".

All publishers used cover rations involving photo covers, with stills from the television series, and drawn/inked/colored art covers.

== Publishers ==
=== Topps Comics ===
Many of the comics were released with multiple covers: one photo cover and one cover with a comic book artist's rendering. These Topps comics introduced Xena's character:

- Hercules: The Legendary Journeys (1996, #3/5)
- Xena: Warrior Princess: Year One (1997)
- Xena: Warrior Princess (1997, 3 issues)
- Xena: Warrior Princess/Joxer: Warrior Prince (1997/1998, 3 issues)
- Xena: Warrior Princess and the Dragon's Teeth (1997/1998, 3 issues)
- Xena: Warrior Princess vs. Callisto (1998, 3 issues)
- Xena: Warrior Princess: The Orpheus Trilogy (1998, 3 issues)
- Xena: Warrior Princess – Bloodline (1998, 2 issues)
- Xena: Warrior Princess and the Original Olympics (1998, 3 issues)
- The Marriage of Hercules and Xena (1998)
- Xena: Warrior Princess and the Wrath of Hera Vol. 1 (1998, 2 issues)

=== Fan Art - Battle On ===
A series of webcomic strips by Jeanette Atwood in the late 1990s, which were a comedic take on the circumstances, relationships, and situations involving Xena and Gabrielle.

While not officially recognized, the material is considered by some to be "comedy gold" and years later remembered fondly by fans of the strip and Xena.

=== Dark Horse Comics ===
Dark Horse's Xena series ran for 14 issues from 1999 to 2000; writers involved included John Wagner and Ian Edginton. Comics featuring Xena were also run in Dark Horse Presents Annual 1999, Dark Horse Jr., and 2000, Girls Rule!. The series was incompletely collected into a series of three trade paperbacks, and later received a full release by Dynamite Entertainment.

=== Dynamite Entertainment ===
Dynamite started publishing Xena comics in 2006 with a four issue mini-series and an annual titled Xena. It was written by John Layman with art by Fabiano Neves. In May 2007 Dynamite and Layman launched another four issue mini-series subtitled Dark Xena, set some time after Xena, with art by Noah Salonga.

In April 2016, a third series of six issues began, written by Catwoman writer Genevieve Valentine, with art by Ariel Mendel. Dynamite started a new monthly Xena: Warrior Princess series in February 2018 which ran for ten issues with writing by Meredith Finch and then Erica Schultz, followed by another six issue series written by Vita Ayala in 2019.

Dynamite also published the two four issue crossovers with Army of Darkness, Why Not? (2008) and What, Again? (2009), as well as the six issue crossover Forever... And a Day (2016).

== Collected editions ==
=== Topps Comics ===
- Xena: Warrior Princess, collects Xena: Warrior Princess #1–2 and #0 with extra material from The Official Xena: Warrior Princess Magazine

=== Dark Horse Comics ===
The first 10 issues have been collected into trade paperbacks (TPB):

- Xena: Warrior Princess:
  - The Warrior Way of Death, by John Wagner, with pencils by Joyce Chin, Clint Hilinski, Mike Deodato and Ivan Reis and inks by Walden Wong, Mike Deodato, Grant Nelson, TPB, collects Xena #1–3, 2000, ISBN 1-56971-452-5
  - Slave, by John Wagner, with pencils by Joyce Chin and Mike Deodato and inks by Clint Hilinski, Fabiano Neves and Walden Wong, TPB, collects Xena #4–6, 2000, ISBN 1-56971-471-1
  - Blood and Shadows, by John Wagner, with pencils by Davide Fabbri and Mike Deodato and inks by Mark Heike, Neil Nelson, TPB, collects Xena #7–10, 2001, ISBN 1-56971-521-1

=== Dynamite Comics ===
- Xena, Warrior Princess: Classic Years Omnibus, collects the Dark Horse Xena: Warrior Princess #1–14, Dark Horse Presents: Dark Horse Jr. Annual 1999, and Dark Horse Presents: Girls Rule! Annual 2000, 2017, ISBN 978-1-5241-0330-9
- Xena: Contest of Pantheons, by John Layman (writer) and Fabiano Neves (artist), TPB collects Xena v2 #1–4, 2007, ISBN 1-933305-35-5
- Xena: Dark Xena, by John Layman (writer) and Noah Salonga (artist), TPB collects Dark Xena #1–4, 2007, ISBN 1-933305-61-4
- Xena: Warrior Princess Omnibus Volume One, collects Xena v2 #1–4, Dark Xena #1–4, and "Strange Visitor" from Xena Annual #1, 2017, ISBN 978-1-5241-0251-7
- Xena: Warrior Princess – All Roads, collects Xena: Warrior Princess v3 #1–6, 2017, ISBN 978-1-5241-0160-2
- Xena: Warrior Princess – Volume 1: Penance, collects Xena: Warrior Princess v3 #1–5, 2018, ISBN 978-1-5241-0734-5
- Xena: Warrior Princess – Volume 2: Mindgames, collects Xena: Warrior Princess v3 #5–10, 2019, ISBN 978-1-5241-1155-7
- Xena: Warrior Princess – Road Warrior, collects Xena: Warrior Princess v4 #1–6, 2019, ISBN 978-1-5241-1290-5

John Layman's first Army of Darkness crossover was also collected.

- Xena: Warrior Princess/Army of Darkness vol. 1: Why Not?, TPB collects Battered and Bruced #1–4, 2009, ISBN 1-60690-008-0
- Xena vs. Army of Darkness Volume 2: What... Again?!, TPB collects #1-4, 2009, ISBN 9781606900321
- Army of Darkness / Xena Omnibus, TPB collects Battered and Bruced #1–4, Volume 2 #1-4, Army of Darkness/Xena: Warrior Princess: Forever and a Day, 2020, ISBN 9781524115074

== See also ==
- List of comics based on television programs
