= Rocket Girl (comics) =

Comic book series

Publication information
- Publisher: Image Comics
- Schedule: Monthly
- Publication date: October 2013 – October 2017
- No. of issues: 10

Creative team
- Created by: Brandon Montclare; Amy Reeder
- Written by: Brandon Montclare
- Artist: Amy Reeder

Collected editions
- Vol 01: Times Squared: ISBN 9781632150554
- Vol 02: Only the Good...: ISBN 9781534303256

Rocket Girl is a 2013 science fiction comic book series created by writer Brandon Montclare and artist Amy Reeder. It was published by Image Comics and ran for 10 issues.

== Publication history ==
The series debuted on October 9, 2013. While the first three issues shipped roughly monthly the title was plagued by delays, with a three month gap between #3 and #4, nearly a year between #5 and #6, seven months between #6 and #7 then nearly two years before #8. Part of the reason for the delays was the creative team's commitment to Marvel's Moon Girl and Devil Dinosaur. The last three issues however were shipped monthly, ending with #10 in October 2017 As with the pair's previous collaboration, Halloween Eve, the comic was partly supported by a Kickstarter campaign, with an exclusive colouring book among the rewards.

Amy Reeder cited Ghostbusters, Beat Street, Law & Order, Miami Vice, Akira, Blade Runner and Back to the Future Part II as among the influences on her art for the series.

== Synopsis ==
=== Vol 01: Times Squared ===
In 1986 at Quintum Mechanics scientist Professor Sharma activates the Q-Engine, which promptly explodes. Stepping out of the debris is Dayoung Johansson, a 15-year old officer of the New York Teen Police Department from 2013 who has arrived to arrest Sharma's team for crimes against time. Her mission is approved by NYTPD commissioner Gomez after she receives a tip that Quintum Mechanics, a tech giant in the New York of 2013, has been tampering with the timestream.

In 1986 Dayoung uses her flight pack to respond to NYPD emergency bands, capturing a gunman. Officers try to arrest her but she escapes and is taken in by Annie Mendez and Ryder Storm, the real brains behind the Q-Engine . Annie takes Dayoung, who she nicknames "Rocket Girl", back to Quintum Mechanics but en route the young officer tackles an armed robber holding up a bodega. While she is successful she is then arrested by Sergeant Ciccione of the NYPD. He turns her flight pack over to Sharma, but Dayoung is able to escape custody and return to the lab. She angrily accuses Annie of planning to reverse engineer her flight pack, which the scientist denies before they come under attack from Quintum Mechanics troops sent from 2013. While Dayoung draws them off Annie heads to the lab, where she is furious to find Sharma rebuilding the Q-Engine. However Ryder persuades them this might be the only way to undo the damage caused by the future Quintum Mechanics. Dayoung is able to disable both of the troops in the subway but crashes out in Grand Central Station - where the appreciative crowd smuggles her away from Ciccione. Dunn, an NYPD officer sent to investigate the chaos in the subway, is stunned a surviving enforcer is his future self. Annie meanwhile overloads the Q-Engine and is fired by Sharma and arrested by Ciccione. Dayoung rescues her en route to the police station, and both face an uncertain future.

Parallel to this in 2013 Gomez and Dayoung's partner Leshawn O'Patrick investigate the mysterious board of Quintum Mechanics. Among the corporation's innovations was replacing the NYPD with the NYTPD. The board have just completed reverse engineering the Q-Engine - which they plan to send back in time to their 1986 incarnation, creating a paradox that will ensure their position. Gomez meanwhile attempts to raid Quintum Mechanics with the full NYTPD. The board responds by withdrawing the force's charter and a struggle breaks out before the city is plunged into a blackout by the board.

=== Vol 02: Only the Good... ===
Dayoung and Annie continue to lie low in 1986, though the former still slips away to discreetly fight crime. Deciding the city needs Rocket Girl she decides to suit up, only to find her gear is missing. Annie has taken it to Quintum Mechanics where Sharma is again trying to rebuild the Q-Engine. Ciccione has staked out the lab and moves in to arrest them but Dayoung is able to escape in her suit. She then saves Mister T and Ed Koch from a hostage situation at Radio City and a hold-up at an arcade, each time evading Ciccione. Dayoung is also being tracked by Dunn, who has salvaged weaponry from the Quintum vehicles along with his partner Phil Tweed. Ciccione attempts to bust them but gets shot, and passes on the information to Dayoung before he dies. She recruits Annie, Ryder and their colleagues Gene and Chaz to help them destroy all the data held at Quintum. Dunn and Tweed close in on the group and Dayoung sets off to meet them. Tweed is injured and tells her of the plan both Dunns have made - to take the technology from Quintum before it is destroyed. Dayoung arrives in time to save her friends, leaving Dunn catatonic. Despite the failure of another attempt to end Quintum, Dayoung is unbowed.

In 2013 Gomez meanwhile locates Dayoung's dismissed previous partner, Natasha Tallchief, who agrees to help the NYTPD take on Quintum. When they get inside they find that the leak was the board's virtual assistant Joshua, Dayoung's journey into the past being part of Quintum's plan. Both the NYTPD and Dayoung realise that the board are future versions of Annie, Ryder, Gene and Chaz, corrupted by the power the Q-Engine technology has given them. The 2013 Annie claims they are stuck in a cycle and sending back Dayoung was necessary to ensure the future of New York. In 1986 Dayoung is shot by the future Dunn, and Annie kills him in turn. Dayoung's death and final words are enough to convince Annie to finally destroy the Q-Engine, ending the cycle.

== Reception ==
Jamie Wilson rated the first issue 7/10 in a review for Big Comic Page, praising the art and moderately criticising the pace. Reviewing the first volume for World Comic Book Review, Tom Kelly gave the series a negative review, criticising the characters and the internal consistency of the storyline while NPR's Etelka Lehoczky was another to praise Reeder's art, noting "DaYoung is strong and graceful without any pneumatic body parts thrusting off the page." Ahead of the second trade's publication, Villain Media praised Amy Reeder's "eyecatching" art.

In 2015 Digital Spy listed Dayoung Johansson as one of the 9 female comic characters they wanted to see in a movie, describing the series as "pure, brazen and wonderfully realised B movie fare presented with skill and flair." CBR listed the title as one of the 10 Image Comics properties best suited to adaptation in 2022

== Collected editions ==
The series has been collected in two in trade paperbacks by Image Comics.

Title	ISBN	Release date	Issues
Rocket Girl Vol 01: Times Squared	9781632150554	9 Jul 2014	Rocket Girl #1-5
Rocket Girl Vol 02: Only the Good...	9781534303256	6 Dec 2017	Rocket Girl #6-10
