= Gatecrasher (disambiguation) =

Gatecrasher is a dance music event formerly held at the venue Gatecrasher 1 in Sheffield, England.

Gatecrasher may also refer to:

- Gatecrasher (person), a person who attends an invite-only event without invitation
- Gatecrasher (Marvel Comics), an extraterrestrial supervillain in the Marvel Universe
- Gatecrasher (role-playing game), a 1996 science fantasy adventure game
