= Chris Sotomayor =

American colorist and cover artist

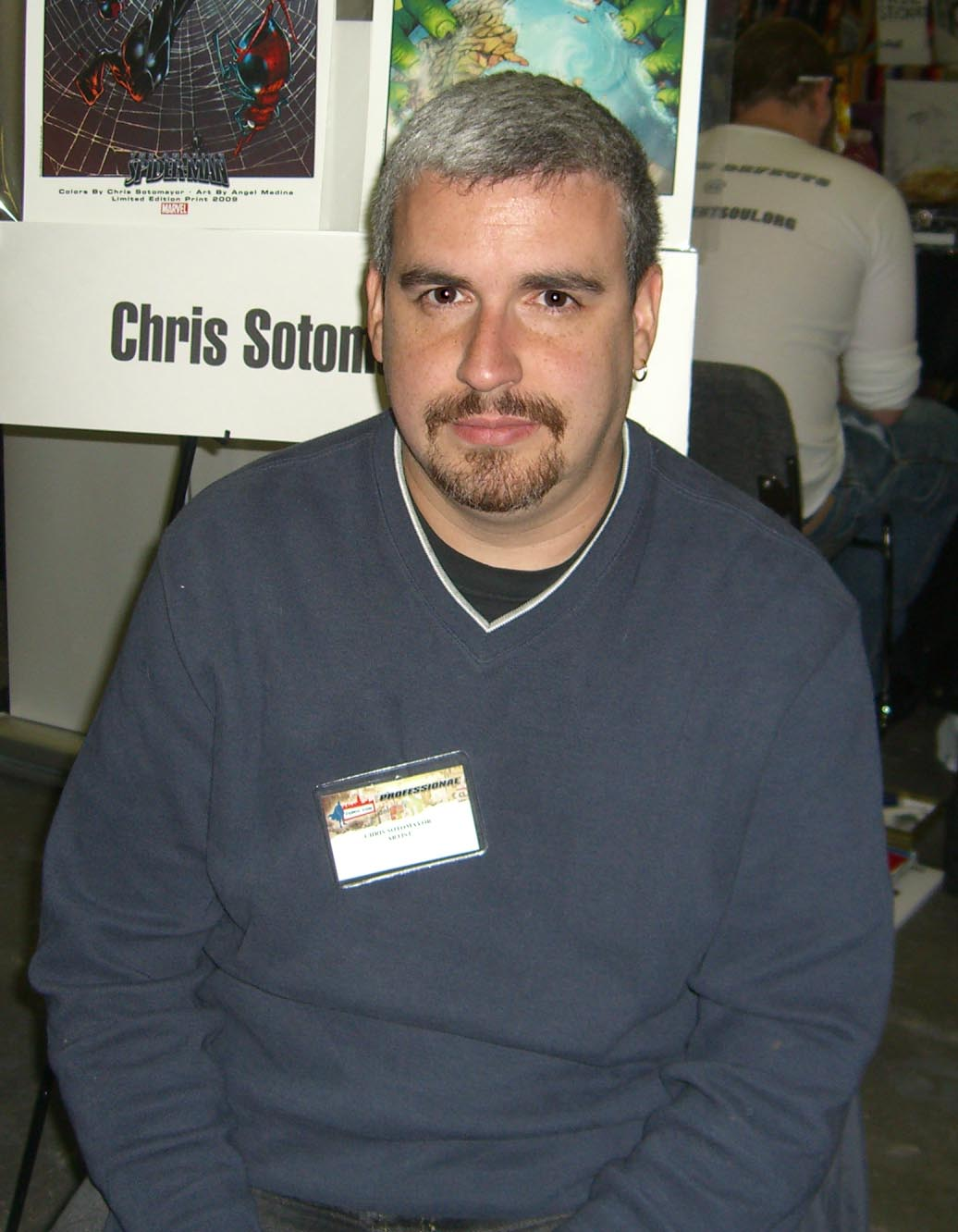
- Sotomayor at the Big Apple Convention in Manhattan, October 17, 2009
- Born: January 27, 1973 (age 53)
- Areas: Colorist, cover artist
- Pseudonym: Soto
- Notable works: Captain Marvel, Avengers, Incredible Hulk, Supreme Power, and Marvel Adventures Fantastic Four

Chris Sotomayor is an American colorist and cover artist. His work includes titles such as Captain Marvel, Avengers, Incredible Hulk, Captain America, Ms. Marvel, Deadpool, Supreme Power, and Marvel Adventures Fantastic Four.

== Bibliography ==
- Incredible Hulk #109 (Oct 2007)
- Ms. Marvel #20 (Dec 2007)
