= Fool's Gold (comics) =

English-language manga by Amy Reeder

- Cover of Fool's Gold vol. 1 (2006), art by Amy Reeder Hadley
- Genre: Romantic comedy
- Author: Amy Reeder Hadley
- Publisher: (Canada) (United States) Tokyopop
- Other publishers: (Hungary) Delta Vision (Finland) Pauna Media Group
- Original run: 2006 – Present
- Volumes: 2

Fool's Gold is an original English-language manga published by Tokyopop. It is written and illustrated by Amy Reeder. The first of a planned three volumes was released on July 11, 2006.

There are currently no plans for the third, and final, volume to be printed.

== Plot ==
Penny is a sophomore who starts a girls-only club whose mission is to help girls find love in gentlemen, rather than the school's jerks. At the club meeting, which are disguised as geology discussions, girls vote on which boys to decree "pyrites." The word becomes slang for a boy that seems good, but is ultimately cheap. If a boy is declared a pyrite, the girls throw darts into a doll, similar to voodoo. This is a vow to not date the boy. Girls also call to attention boys that are not jerks.

The club completely changes the high school hierarchy. Girls begin to avoid jocks and date nerds. Penny finds herself as a sort of "queen bee" the other girls look up to. The new arrangements are shaken when Penny finds herself falling for a pyrite and Hannah shows a boy the club's flyer.

== Characters ==
Penny
A 15-year-old girl who designs clothes with her aunt, Nicole. She is confident and likable, but she considers Katie her only friend. Penny regards her looks as art, not necessarily the means of attracting boys or outdoing other girls. Her mother died from pneumonia.

Nicole
Penny's childish, 26-year-old aunt. Nicole is a fashion designer who runs a costume shop. Her relationship with Penny could best be described as sisterly.

Steve
Penny's father. He is an ER doctor who thinks fashion design is a frivolous occupation and wants his daughter to focus on studies more. Penny finds it hard to meet his expectations.

Katie
A sixteen-year-old who is much less fashion conscious than Penny. She does not gossip, and is honest. Unlike Penny, she has had boyfriends. Katie's relationships were the springboard for the founding of the club. Katie has to move in volume one, but she and Penny keep in touch. Katie is Penny's closest confidante.

Blake
A rich sixteen-year-old whose parents moved into Colorado's mountains. He is a perfectionist, particularly when it comes to grammar. He goes around town at night with a stencil and spray paints signs, correcting grammar. His biography on Tokyopop's website describes him as "borderline OCD" and a "nerd," albeit handsome. He does not realize that his desire to perfect people around him makes him seem conceited and mean.

Hannah
An outgoing, vain sixteen-year-old. She rarely sees her parents except when she has a performance in something. She is the best student in her class, has been in fifteen commercials, and models. Unlike Penny, she is fixated on designer clothes. She feels Penny is stealing the attention from her.

Orion
A fifteen-year-old environmentalist who tries to organize his classmates into planting trees and picking up trash. His parents are hippies, and his hair is long enough to reach his shoulders and cover his eyes. He is particularly knowledgeable when it comes to birds; he can identify any song or appearance. He is usually very shy, only speaking to organize environmental clean-ups. He starts dating Penny, and he lets her cut his hair. They have their first kiss with each other. Jealousy starts to set in when Penny starts to have less time for him because of her club and when she starts hanging out more with Blake.

== Release ==
The series is also licensed in Finland by Pauna Media Group,
