= Amy Reeder =

American comic artist

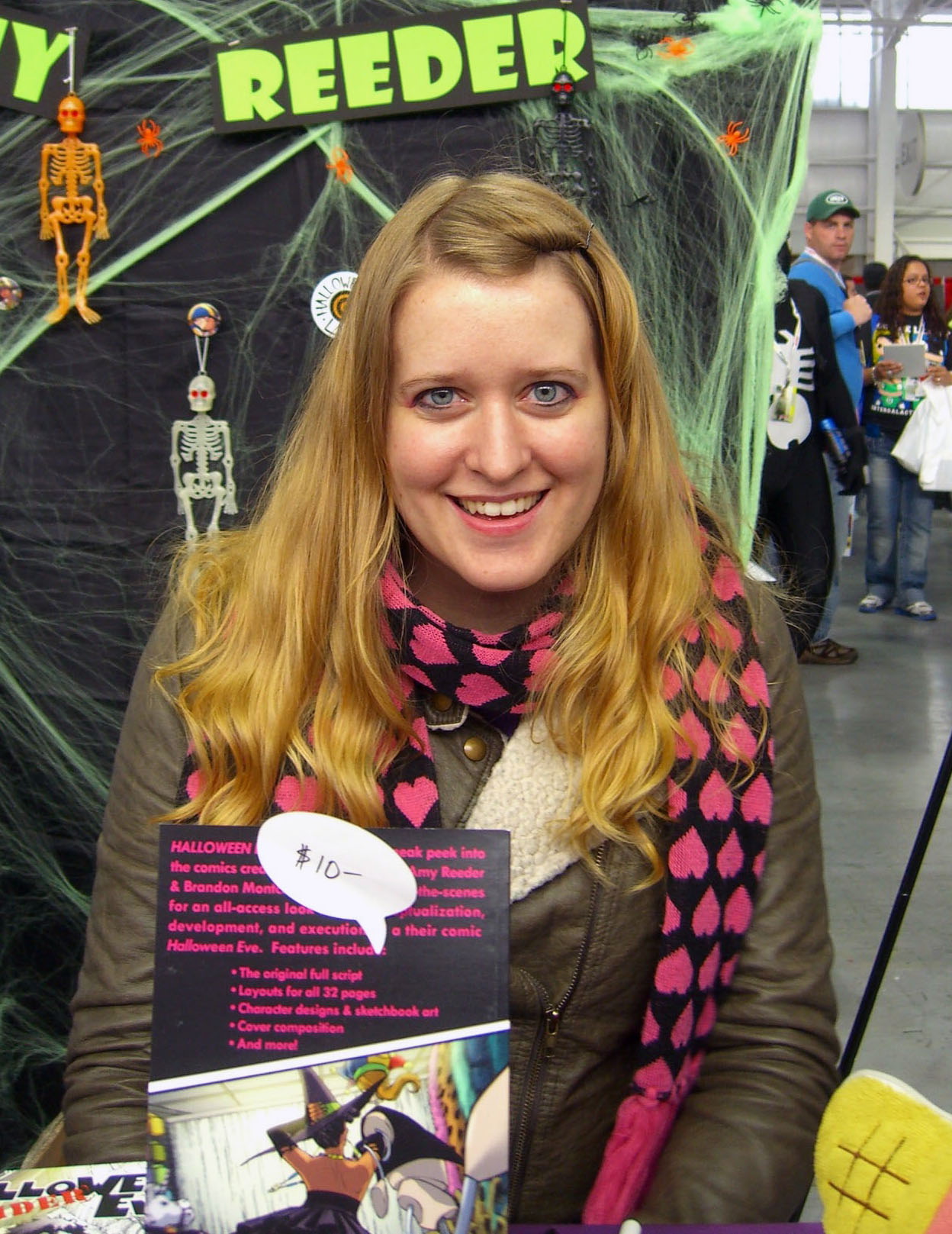
- Reeder at the 2012 New York Comic Con
- Born: Amy Reeder; August 25, 1980 (age 46) Denver, Colorado, U.S.
- Areas: Writer, Penciller, Inker
- Notable works: Fool's Gold; Madame Xanadu; Batwoman; Moon Girl And Devil Dinosaur

Amy Reeder (born August 25, 1980), formerly known as Amy Reeder Hadley, is an American comic book artist and writer known for her work on titles such as Fool's Gold, Madame Xanadu, Batwoman, and Moon Girl And Devil Dinosaur.

== Early life ==
Amy Reeder was born August 25, 1980. She is originally from Denver, Colorado and obtained a Bachelor of Science in Social Science Teaching.

== Career ==
Amy Reeder was first discovered through the fourth of Tokyopop's Rising Stars of Manga competitions and later wrote and illustrated the OEL manga Fool's Gold.

Reeder became the lead artist on the Madame Xanadu series from DC Comics' Vertigo imprint, with writer Matt Wagner. In a 2007 interview, she credited editor Brandon Montclare with helping her get her start in the comics industry. In 2010, DC announced that she would take over alternate art duties for the Batwoman series with J. H. Williams III, in addition to providing variant covers to that title and Supergirl, the latter of which she began with issue 55. She then left the Batwoman book due to "creative differences" in the middle of the next story arc. Reeder moved to Image Comics and created Rocket Girl with writer Brandon Montclare. In 2015, she and Montclare began co-writing Moon Girl And Devil Dinosaur for Marvel Comics. She wrote and drew a six-issue Amethyst limited series in 2020.

== Technique and materials ==
In addition to pencils and an electric eraser, Reeder employs, for her hand-colored work, Copic Multiliners and Copic Markers. Reeder is left-handed, and when illustrating a cover, she begins the bottom right of the drawing surface and works her way to the top left, in order to avoid smears. She also employs a drawing tablet for her digital work. Computer programs that she uses include Adobe Photoshop, Corel Painter, and ComicWorks.

== Personal life ==
Reeder enjoys writing music, singing and sewing. She resides in the Greenwich Village neighborhood in Manhattan.

== Awards ==
=== Nominations ===
- 2009 Eisner Award for Best New Series (with Wagner and Friend, for Madame Xanadu)
- 2009 Eisner Award for Best Penciller/Inker or Penciller/Inker Team (with Friend, for Madame Xanadu)
- 2009 Eisner Award for Best Cover Artist (for Madame Xanadu)

== Bibliography ==
- Fool's Gold (script and art), Tokyopop, July 2006
- Madame Xanadu #1–10, 16–18, 21–23, 29 (pencils/inks in #1–2, pencils only in others), script by Matt Wagner; inks by Richard Friend, ongoing series, Vertigo, August 2008–January 2011
- "Madame Xanadu in: Captive Audience" (pencils), script by Matt Wagner, in House of Mystery: Halloween Annual 1, Vertigo, December 2009
- Supergirl vol. 5 #55–61, 63, 66, Annual #2 (covers only), ongoing series, DC Comics, October 2010–September 2011
- Batwoman #0, 6–8 (pencils), script by J. H. Williams III and W. Haden Blackman; inks by Rob Hunter and Richard Friend, ongoing series, DC Comics, January 2011, April–June 2012
- Halloween Eve #1 (pencils and inks), script by Brandon Montclare, one-shot, Image Comics, October 2012
- Ghosts vol. 2 #1 (pencils and inks), script by Cecil Castellucci, one-shot, DC Comics, December 2012
- Rocket Girl #1–10 (pencils and inks), script by Brandon Montclare, limited series, Image Comics, October 2013–May 2014
- Moon Girl And Devil Dinosaur #1–19 script by Reeder and Brandon Montclare, art by Natacha Bustos, ongoing series, Marvel Comics, January 2016–July 2017
- Amethyst #1–6, script by Reeder, limited series, DC Comics, April 2020–February 2021

Preceded by n/a	Madame Xanadu artist 2008–2010	Succeeded by Marley Zarcone
Preceded by n/a	Batwoman artist (with J. H. Williams III); 2011–2012	Succeeded by Trevor McCarthy
