= Jett Atwood =

American animator and cartoonist

Jeanette "Jett" Atwood is an American animator and cartoonist currently living in Utah. A graduate of classical animation at Sheridan College, Jett has worked on numerous video games and short films as a storyboard artist, animator, and writer. Ms. Atwood has contributed animation to Smart Bomb Interactive titles such as Pac-Man World Rally (8/2006) and Snoopy vs. the Red Baron (2006), in which she was also the writer. Atwood is a successful cartoonist with numerous works, both online web comics and in print.

She is the creator of Red Sparrow, detailing the trials of a rookie superhero, the Battlestar Galactica parody Frakkin' Toasters and the Xena parody Battle On. Some of her strips from Battle On have been reprinted and featured in the books Lucy Lawless & Renee O'Connor: Warrior Stars of Xena and How Xena Changed Our Lives, both by Nikki Stafford.

Atwood is a regular contributor to Sunstone Magazine.

In 2005 her comic Puzzles was collected in the Eisner Award-nominated anthology, 24 Hour Comics Day Highlights 2005. It was her first 24-hour comic. For the 2006 24 Hour Comic Day, Jett created a sequel, Loose Threads. It revisits the characters approximately a year and a half after the events of Puzzles (that being the amount of time between the competition.) A year afterward, the final chapter, Word Games, was completed as part of the 2007 24 Hour Comic Challenge.

Jett Atwood collaborated on a comic book series, iPlates, with writer Stephen Carter. In August 2012, iPlates Volume 1 was published and received largely positive reviews on various blogs. The book details the epic adventures of the main character Zeniff as he attempts to defend his city from an invading army, and is based on stories in the Book of Mormon. Volume 2 (ISBN 1503202224) was released following a successful crowdfunding campaign.

In 2016 Atwood illustrated a book in the For Beginners series, Mormonism for Beginners (ISBN 1939994527), also written by Carter. Patrick Q. Mason, chair of Mormon studies at Claremont Graduate University, praised Atwood's "clever illustrations."
