= Brigham Young and the Mountain Meadows Massacre =

1857 incident in Utah

In 1857, at the time of the Mountain Meadows Massacre, Brigham Young, was serving as President of the Church of Jesus Christ of Latter-day Saints (LDS Church) and as Governor of Utah Territory. He was replaced as governor the following year by Alfred Cumming. Evidence as to whether or not Young ordered the attack on the migrant column is conflicted. Historians still debate the autonomy and precise roles of local Cedar City LDS Church officials in ordering the massacre and Young's concealing of evidence in its aftermath. Young's use of inflammatory and violent language in response to a federal expedition to the territory (known as the Utah War) added to the tense atmosphere at the time of the attack. After the massacre, Young stated in public forums that God had taken vengeance on the Baker–Fancher party. It is unclear whether Young held this view because of a possible belief that this specific group posed a threat to colonists or that they were responsible for past crimes against Mormons. According to historian William P. MacKinnon, "After the war, Buchanan implied that face-to-face communications with Brigham Young might have averted the Utah War, and Young argued that a north–south telegraph line in Utah could have prevented the Mountain Meadows Massacre."

== Young's theology ==
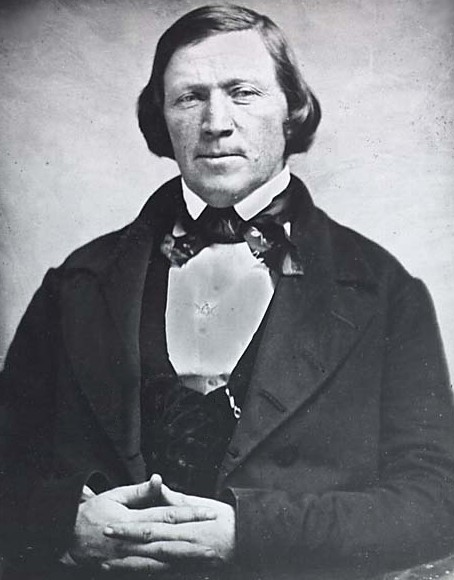
Historians debate the role of Brigham Young in the massacre. Young was theocratic leader of the Utah Territory at the time of the massacre.

The Mountain Meadows Massacre victimized several groups of emigrants from the northwestern Arkansas region who had started their treks to California in early 1857, joining along the way and becoming known as the Baker–Fancher party. For the decade prior the emigrants' arrival, Utah Territory had existed essentially as a theocracy led by Brigham Young. As part of Young's vision of a pre-millennial "Kingdom of God," Young established colonies along the California and Old Spanish Trails, where Mormon officials governed as leaders of church, state, and military. Two of the southernmost establishments were Parowan and Cedar City, led respectively by stake presidents William H. Dame and Isaac C. Haight. Haight and Dame were also the senior regional military leaders of the Mormon militia. During the period just before the massacre, known as the Mormon Reformation, Mormon teachings were dramatic and strident. The religion had undergone a period of intense conflict with non-Mormons in the American midwest, and faithful Mormons made solemn oaths to pray for vengeance upon those who killed the "prophets" including founder Joseph Smith, and more recently apostle Parley P. Pratt, who was murdered in April 1857 while traveling as a missionary in Arkansas.

== Young's belated message to Isaac C. Haight, acting commander of the Iron County Brigade ==
On September 8, 1857, Captain Stewart Van Vliet, of the US Army Quartermaster Corps, arrived in Salt Lake City. Van Vliet's mission was to inform Young that the US troops then approaching Utah did not intend to attack the Mormons, but intended to establish an army base near Salt Lake City and to request Young's cooperation in procuring supplies for the army. Young informed Van Vliet that he was skeptical that the army's intentions were peaceful and that the Mormons intended to resist occupation.

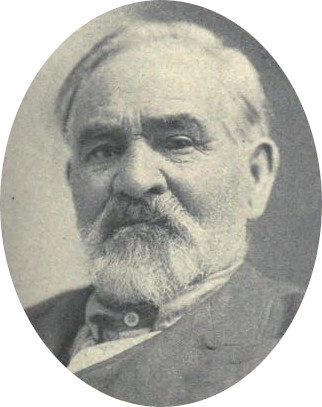
James Haslam, messenger who brought news of the emigrant party from Cedar City and rode back with Brigham Young's instructions. The siege and massacre took place while he was en route.

On September 10, 1857, James Holt Haslam arrived in Salt Lake City, after experiencing long delays during his nearly 300-mile journey, to deliver a message to Young from the acting commander of the Iron County Brigade, Isaac C. Haight. This letter has yet to be found, but accounts say that it asked Young what, if anything, should be done with the Baker–Fancher party camped at nearby Mountain Meadows. After delivering the letter to Young, Haslam was told to rest for a few hours then return to pick up the reply. After his rest, Haslam picked up the reply from Young and was instructed to return to Cedar City with the letter quickly and not to "spare horseflesh."

Young's message of reply to Haight, dated September 10, 1857, read:

In regard to emigration trains passing through our settlements, we must not interfere with them until they are first notified to keep away. You must not meddle with them. The Indians we expect will do as they please but you should try and preserve good feelings with them. There are no other trains going south that I know of[.] [I]f those who are there will leave let them go in peace.

However, by the time that the express rider delivered Young's letter to Haight, the massacre at Mountain Meadows had already taken place. According to trial testimony given later by Haslam, when Haight read Young's words, he sobbed like a child and could manage only the words, "Too late, too late."

Historians debate whether the Haight letter absolves Young of any complicity. Mormon historian Juanita Brooks believes that the letter demonstrates that Young "did not order the massacre, and would have prevented it if he could." Brooks writes, "While Brigham Young and other church authorities did not specifically order the massacre, they did preach sermons and set up social conditions that made it possible." Brooks has argued the massacre was an overreaction by Mormon militia forces which resulted in the death of settlers and the tarnishing of the Church's reputation.

In Blood of the Prophets, Mormon historian William Bagley echoes David White's conclusion that the letter does not absolve Young of any wrongdoing. Bagley notes that Young often started his letters with broad generalizations with little meaning and then conceal the main message in one or two terse sentences in the middle of the text. In this case, the "real message" would have been that the Indians should be left to "do as they please." In such a framework, the message to "not interfere" would be subordinate to the main message: let nothing stand in the way of the Mormon-Paiute alliance.

== Young's investigation ==
Young first heard about the massacre from John D. Lee, one of the participants. Several weeks after the massacre, September 29, 1857, Lee briefed Young in Salt Lake City. (Brigham Young was mistaken when he later testified that the meeting took place "some two of three months after the massacre" Young 1875.) Decades later, Young's son, who was 13 in 1857, said that he was in the office during that meeting and that he remembered Lee blaming the massacre on the Native Americans. According to Lee, he informed Young that the Mormons were responsible. However, Young later testified that he cut Lee off when he started to describe the massacre because he could not bear to hear the details.

Some time after Lee's meeting with Young, Jacob Hamblin said that he had heard a detailed description of the massacre and Mormon involvement from Lee and that Hamblin had reported it to Young and George A. Smith soon after the massacre. Hamblin said he was told by Young and Smith to keep quiet, but that "as soon as we can get a court of justice, we will ferret this thing out."

When Young sent his report on the massacre to the Commissioner of Indian Affairs in 1858, he said that it was the work of Native Americans.

== Lee's suggestion of a conspiracy ==
During the 1870s Lee, Dame, Philip Klingensmith, Ellott Willden, and George Adair, Jr. were indicted and arrested; warrants were obtained to pursue the arrests of four others (Haight, John Higbee, William C. Stewart, and Samuel Jukes) who had successfully gone into hiding. Klingensmith escaped prosecution by agreeing to testify against the others. In 1870, Young excommunicated some of the participants, including Haight and Lee, from the LDS Church. The U.S. posted bounties of $500 each for the capture of Haight, Higbee, and Stewart, and prosecutors chose not to pursue their cases against Dame, Willden, and Adair.

At Lee's sentencing, as required by Utah Territory statute, he was given the option of being hung, shot, or beheaded, and he chose to be shot. Lee was executed by firing squad at Mountain Meadows on March 23, 1877. Young believed that Lee's punishment was just but not a sufficient blood atonement, given the enormity of the crime, to allow Lee entrance into the celestial kingdom. Prior to his execution, Lee claimed that he was a scapegoat for others involved:

I have always believed, since that day, that General George A. Smith was then visiting Southern Utah to prepare the people for the work of exterminating Captain Fancher's train of emigrants, and I now believe that he was sent for that purpose by the direct command of Brigham Young. The knowledge of how George A. Smith felt towards the emigrants, and his telling me that he had a long talk with Haight on the subject, made me certain that it was the wish of the Church authorities, that Fancher and his train should be wiped out, and knowing all this, I did not doubt then, and I do not doubt it now, either, that Haight was acting by full authority from the Church leaders, and that the orders he gave to me were just the orders that he had been directed to give, when he ordered me to raise the Indians and have them attack the emigrants.
