= Will Bagley =

American historian (1950–2021)

William Grant Bagley (May 27, 1950 – September 28, 2021) was a historian specializing in the history of the Western United States and the American Old West. Bagley wrote about the fur trade, overland emigration, American Indians, military history, frontier violence, railroads, mining, and Utah and the Mormons.

== Biography ==
William Grant Bagley was born to Lawrence Miles Bagley and Margene Bailey Bagley on May 27, 1950, in Salt Lake City, Utah. His ancestors came from England, Wales, Ireland, Scotland, Sweden and Germany. He was a descendant of the fifth Governor of the Colony of Connecticut, John Webster. His paternal great-grandfather was a Mormon pioneer from New Brunswick, Canada. From the age of nine he was raised in Oceanside, California, where his father was a long-serving mayor in the 1980s. His younger brother Pat Bagley became the notable Salt Lake Tribune editorial cartoonist and they are the uncles of professional surfer Dusty Payne. Bagley attended Brigham Young University in 1967–68, and then he transferred to University of California, Santa Cruz (UCSC), where he obtained his B.A. in History in 1971. At Santa Cruz Bagley studied writing with Page Stegner and history with John Dizikes. He graduated from UCSC between Richard White and Patricia Limerick, two of the leading lights of the "New Western History." While at UCSC he received the California State Scholar and President's Scholar awards. He considered an integral part of his education a trip he took in 1969, on a homemade raft built of framing lumber and barrels, down the Mississippi River from Rock Island, Illinois to New Orleans. After graduation he spent three years in North Carolina studying the local Bluegrass music and culture, and playing in bands.

After college, Bagley worked as a laborer, carpenter, cabinet maker, and country musician for more than a decade. In 1979 he founded Groundhog Records to release his long-playing record, "The Legend of Jesse James." In 1982 he abandoned music and hard labor to take a writing position at Evans & Sutherland, a pioneering computer graphics firm. He worked in various high-tech ventures until 1995, when he started his career as a professional historian. He wrote more than twenty books. In 2008 historian David Roberts dubbed him the "sharpest of all thorns in the side of the Mormon historical establishment."

Although he was raised as a member of The Church of Jesus Christ of Latter-Day Saints (LDS Church), Bagley discontinued membership as an adult. He publicly stated that he "never believed the theology since [he] was old enough to think about it." However, he was friends with believers and considered himself a "heritage Mormon," valuing his pioneer lineage.

In September 2014, the Utah State Historical Society granted Bagley its most prestigious honor as a Fellow, joining "the ranks of such luminaries as Dale Morgan, Wallace Stegner, Juanita Brooks, and Leonard Arrington." Western Writers of America gave Bagley its 2019 Owen Wister Award for Lifetime Contributions to Western Literature in 2019. He said it was "an expression of affection from my WWA friends that is appreciated and humbling, for it calls to mind the words 'I am not worthy!'"

Bagley lived and worked in Salt Lake City, Utah, until his death in 2021 at age 71.

== Publications ==
Bagley published extensively over the years and was still active at the time of his death. He was the author and editor of twenty books and of many articles and reviews in professional journals, such as the Western Historical Quarterly, Utah Historical Quarterly, Overland Journal, The Journal of Mormon History, and Montana The Magazine of Western History. His column, "History Matters", appeared every Sunday for four years (2000–2004) in The Salt Lake Tribune.

== Editorial work ==
He served as editor of News from the Plains, the newsletter of the Oregon-California Trails Association, for two years. Continuing its hundred-year tradition of letting the people of the West recount their own history, in 1997 the Arthur H. Clark Company launched a new historical series, Kingdom in the West: The Mormons and the American Frontier. Bagley was editor of this projected 16-volume series. The series presents essential source-documents that look at the West through Mormon eyes and the Mormons through Western eyes. Published volumes describe the Mexican–American War, the conquest of California and the gold rush, the Brigham Young pioneer party of 1847, European visitors to "Zion," Mormon polygamy, the Utah War, and the Mountain Meadows Massacre. Fifteen volumes have appeared, most recently Richard L. Saunders' Dale Morgan on the Mormons: Collected Works Part 2, 1949-1971 and William P. MacKinnon's At Sword's Point, Part 2: A Documentary History of the Utah War, 1858-1859.

Other significant volumes include Michael W. Homer's On the Way to Somewhere Else: European Sojourners in the Mormon West; B. Carmon Hardy's Doing the Works of Abraham: Mormon Polygamy, Its Origin, Practice, and Demise; Bagley and David L. Bigler's Innocent Blood: Essential Narratives of the Mountain Meadows Massacre; and Playing with Shadows: Voices of Dissent in the Mormon West, which Bagley edited with Polly Aird and Jeff Nichols.

== Activity ==
As a member of "Speakers Bureaus", Will Bagley personally spoke many times in public. He gave academic papers at the annual conventions of the Western History Association, the Mormon History Association, Sunstone Magazine, the Oregon-California Trails Association, the Communal Studies Association, and the Center for Studies on New Religions. Bagley was a research associate at Yale University's Beinecke Library in 2000 and was the library's Archibald Hanna Jr. Fellow in American history in 2009. During the 2008 academic year, he and author Stephen Trimble served as Wallace Stegner Centennial Fellows at the University of Utah's Tanner Humanities Center. He worked as a historical consultant for National Geographic magazine, the National Park Service, the Wyoming State Historic Preservation Office, the "Nevada Humanities Council or Committee" (i.e., Nevada Humanities, a Nevada 501(c)(3) nonprofit organization, affiliate of the National Endowment for the Humanities), and for more than a dozen documentary films including A&E Television's Mountain Meadows Massacre and The Mormon Rebellion, and PBS's, The Mormons. He also worked on historical interpretive design for the Bureau of Land Management. An academic public health panel selected a local historian, Will Bagley, to speak on “The Woman's Face of Medicine in Frontier Utah”. Historian Bagley, "whose great-great-grandparents lost seven children in three weeks to whooping cough", discussed Utah's medical history and women who "dealt courageously with diphtheria epidemics of 1864, 1872, 1891, 1900, and 1947." In lock step with pioneer women in the fight against communicable disease, Bagley reviewed a historically based novel by Amy C. Wadsworth who researched her gg-grandfather Bailey's Mormon polygamy and 1878 loss of seven children to diphtheria: “... Resolution touched me as a historian of Mormonism because it spoke truth to the most enduring problems of our past.” Both authors have Bailey ancestry.

== Leadership ==
Will Bagley was a former member of the Board of Directors of the Utah Rivers Council, Westerners International, the Oregon-California Trails Association. the Friends of the Marriott Library at the University of Utah and the Utah Westerners. He established Prairie Dog Press in 1991 to publish A Road from El Dorado. The press eventually expanded into a consulting business that has handled book design and typesetting, publishing, historical research, and contract writing. The press has worked with the National Park Service, the Bureau of Land Management, the Marriott Library, the History Channel, and PBS.

== Blood of the Prophets ==
Bagley's book Blood of the Prophets deals with the Mountain Meadows massacre and won numerous awards, including a Spur from Western Writers of America and best-book awards from the Denver Public Library and the Western History Association. The New York Review of Books described the study as "an exhaustive, meticulously documented, highly readable history that captures the events and atmosphere that gave rise to the massacre, as well as its long, tortuous aftermath. Bagley has taken great care in negotiating the minefield presented by what remains of the historical record."

According to Robert M. Utley, "[e]ver since 1857, the Mormon Church has vehemently exempted itself and Brigham Young from any complicity in this crime against humanity. Church-approved histories embrace this interpretation when they mention it at all. The official church historians and custodians of the massive church archives have carefully avoided the issue. Parts of the archives have been 'lost,' restricted, sanitized, and even manufactured. Mormon historians who probe beyond the prescribed limits face isolation at best, excommunication at worst. ... Such is the prospect for Will Bagley. ... Will Bagley has made a major contribution to western American history. Already, the church counterattack has begun. ... He is likely to take some painful personal hits, but his scholarship will withstand the professedly scholarly hits."

== Work in progress ==
Before his death, Bagley was engaged in his most ambitious project, a projected four-volume study of overland trails and western expansion "Overland West: The Story of the Oregon and California Trails." Two volumes are now available.

The first installment, So Rugged and Mountainous: Blazing the Trails to Oregon and California, 1812–1848, appeared in 2010. It won several awards, and The Atlantic selected it as its Editor's Choice in September 2011.

With Golden Visions Bright Before Them: Trails to the Mining West, the second volume, appeared in 2012."As usual, Bagley delivers hard truths in shimmering prose, lifting the veil of romance that surrounds so much of the American West," The Salt Lake Tribune commented shortly after its release. "It's no secret that those who packed up their life's belongings for a new shot at life on the frontier suffered and struggled, but Bagley reveals it all through meticulous research that gives it depth and meaning."

Based on his professional experience in the computer business, Bagley wrote a history of LexisNexis with the company's first general counsel. If the book were successful, he planned to write a trilogy about the computer revolution, "The Machine of Time: Chronicles of the Computer Age," which he jokingly called his "Digit Iliad."

== Honors ==
- 1991 Evans Manuscript Prize.
- Wagon Award 1993. Highest award for service to the Utah Crossroads Chapter of the Oregon-California Trails Association (OCTA).
- 1997 Steven F. Christensen Best Documentary Award from the Mormon History Association.
- 1997 T. Edgar Lyon Award for Best Article of the Year from the Mormon History Association.
- 1998 First Place, Non-Fiction Book, and Publication Prize, Utah Arts Council Original Writing Competition.
- 1999 National Certificate of Appreciation for special efforts in historic preservation, Oregon-California Trails Association.
- 2000 Steven F. Christensen Best Documentary Award from the Mormon History Association.
- 2001 Utah Military History Award from Utah State Historical Society.
- 2002 For the book Blood of the Prophets. Utah Arts Council's Original Writing Competition Publication Prize, the Western Writers of America's Spur Award, the Denver Public Library's Caroline Bancroft History Prize, Westerners International's Best Book Award, the John Whitmer Historical Association's Smith-Petit Best Book Award, and the Western History Association's John W. Caughey Prize for the year's most distinguished book on the history of the American West.
- 2007 Utah Arts Council Original Writing Competition, Second Place, Biography, Always a Cowboy: Judge Wilson McCarthy and the Rescue of the Denver & Rio Grande Western Railroad
- 2008 Utah Arts Council Original Writing Competition, Second Place, Novel, River
- 2008 Wallace Stegner Centennial Fellowship from the Tanner Humanities Center at the University of Utah.
- 2009 Archibald Hanna Jr. Fellowship in American History, Beinecke Rare Book and Manuscript Library at Yale University.
- 2010 Merrill Mattes Award for Excellence in Writing, The Oregon-California Trails Association, with Rick Grunder, for "'I Could Hardly Hold the Pen': Phebe Ann Wooley Davis's Hard Road to Utah and Back, 1864–1865." Overland Journal 27:3 (Fall 2009).
- Choice Magazine's Outstanding Academic Titles of 2010, So Rugged and Mountainous: Blazing the Trails to Oregon and California, 1840–1848.
- 2011 Western Heritage Award (The Wrangler), for So Rugged and Mountainous: Blazing the Trails to Oregon and California, 1840–1848.
- The John Whitmer Historical Association's Smith-Pettit Best Book Award in Latter Day Saint History, 2011, for David L. Bigler and Will Bagley, The Mormon Rebellion: America's First Civil War, 1857–1858
- 2012 Spur, Best Western Nonfiction Historical, Western Writers of America for The Mormon Rebellion: America's First Civil War, 1857–1858
- Utah State Historical Society, Amy Allen Price Military History Award, 2012, for David L. Bigler and Will Bagley, The Mormon Rebellion: America's First Civil War, 1857–1858
- Utah State Historical Society, Smith-Pettit Best Documentary History, for Jeffrey Nichols, Polly Aird, and Will Bagley, Playing with Shadows: Voices of Dissent in the Mormon West
- 2013 Spur, Best Western Nonfiction Historical, Western Writers of America for With Golden Visions Bright Before Them: Trails to the Mining West, 1849–1852
- 2013, Members of the Western Writers of America pick Blood of the Prophets as the sixth best Nonfiction book of the last 60 years.
- 2013 Hall of Fame Inductee for Arts: William Bagley, Class of 1967. Hall of Fame Winner. Recognizing distinguished alumni from Oceanside High School. Oceanside High School Foundation & Alumni Association.
- 2015, South Pass: Gateway to a Continent Westerners International, Co-founders “Best Book” Award, 2014; Utah State Historical Society, Francis Armstrong Madsen Best Utah History Book, 2015; Best Western Historical Nonfiction, Spur Finalist
- 2017, Best Western Short Nonfiction, Spur Finalist for "Touching History: A Grandson's Memories of Felix Marion Jones and the Massacre at Mountain Meadows, Utah Historical Quarterly
- 2018 Greg Franzwa Award. Lifetime Contributions to Overland Trail History, Oregon-California Trails Association.
- 2019 Owen Wister Award for Lifetime Contributions to Western Literature from Western Writers of America

== List of books by Will Bagley ==
- Editor, A Road From El Dorado: The 1848 Trail Journal of Ephraim Green. Salt Lake City: Prairie Dog Press, 01 JAN 1991. ISBN 096278043X.A Road From El Dorado: The 1848 Trail Journal of Ephraim Green.
- Editor, Frontiersman: Abner Blackburn's Narrative. Salt Lake City: University of Utah Press, 1992. ISBN 0-87480-401-9.
- Roderic Korns and Dale L. Morgan, eds., West from Fort Bridger: The Pioneering of Immigrant Trails across Utah, 1846–1850, revised and updated by Will Bagley and Harold Schindler. Logan: Utah State University Press, 1994. ISBN 0-87421-350-9.
- Pat Bagley and Will Bagley, This is the Place: A Crossroads of Utah's Past. Carson City, Nevada: Buckaroo Books, 1996. A children's book exploring Utah history. ISBN 1-885628-25-0.
- Editor, The Pioneer Camp of the Saints: The 1846 and 1847 Mormon Trail Journals of Thomas Bullock (Spokane, Washington: The Arthur H. Clark Company, 1997). ISBN 978-0-87062-276-2
- Bagley, Will, Scoundrel's Tale: The Samuel Brannan Papers (Arthur H. Clark Company, February 1999) ISBN 978-0-87062-287-8
- Editor, with David L. Bigler, Army of Israel: Mormon Battalion Narratives Spokane, Washington: The Arthur H. Clark Company, 2000. ISBN 978-0-87062-297-7
- Bagley, Will, ed. "A Bright, Rising Star": A Brief Life and a Letter of James Ferguson, Sergeant Major, Mormon Battalion; Adjutant General, Nauvoo Legion. Spokane, Washington: The Arthur H. Clark Company, 2000.
- Bagley, Will. Blood of the Prophets: Brigham Young and the Massacre at Mountain Meadows. Norman: University of Oklahoma Press, 2002. Paperback ISBN 978-0-8061-3639-4
- Bagley, Will. Always a Cowboy: Judge Wilson McCarthy and the Rescue of the Denver & Rio Grande Western Railroad. Logan: Utah State University Press, 2008. ISBN 0-87421-716-4.
- Editor, with David L. Bigler, Innocent Blood: Essential Narratives of the Mountain Meadows Massacre Norman, Oklahoma: Arthur Clark Co, 2008. Hardcover ISBN 978-0-87062-362-2
- Bagley, Will. So Rugged and Mountainous: Blazing the Trails to Oregon and California. 1812–1848. Volume I of the Overland West: The Story of the Oregon and California Trials" series. Norman: The University of Oklahoma, 2010. ISBN 978-0-8061-4103-9
- Bagley, Will, with David L. Bigler. The Mormon Rebellion: America's First Civil War, 1857–1858. Norman: The University of Oklahoma, 2011. Hardcover ISBN 978-0-8061-4135-0. Paperback ISBN 978-0-8061-4315-6
- Editor, with Polly Aird and Jeffrey Nichols, Playing with Shadows: Voices of Dissent in the Mormon West Norman, Oklahoma: Arthur Clark Co, 2011. ISBN 978-0-87062-380-6
- Bagley, Will. With Golden Visions Bright Before Them: Trails to the Mining West, 1849–1852. Volume II of the Overland West: The Story of the Oregon and California Trials" series. Norman: The University of Oklahoma, 2012. ISBN 978-0-8061-4284-5
- Bagley, Will. '"South Pass: Gateway to a Continent." Norman, Okla: University of Oklahoma Press, 2014. ISBN 978-0-8061-4442-9
- Bagley, Will. '"Across the Plains, Mountains, and Deserts: A Bibliography of the Oregon-California Trail, 1812–1912." Salt Lake City: The Prairie Dog Press for the National Park Service, 2014.
- "The Whites Want Every Thing: Native Voices from the Mormon West," Norman, Oklahoma: The Arthur H. Clark Co., 2019. Volume XVI of Kingdom in the West: The Mormons and the American Frontier. This ends the series.
- "River Fever: Adventures on the Mississippi, 1969-1972." Salt Lake City: Signature Books, 2019. It took fifty years for Bagley to complete and publish this book, but it's now in print.
