= The Mountain Meadows Massacre (book) =

Book by Juanita Brooks

- First edition
- Author: Juanita Brooks
- Language: English
- Subject: Mountain Meadows massacre
- Publisher: University of Oklahoma Press
- Publication date: 1950 (1st Edition)
- Publication place: United States
- Media type: Print (Hardcover) & (Paperback)

The Mountain Meadows Massacre (1950) by Juanita Brooks was the first definitive study of the Mountain Meadows Massacre.

Juanita Brooks, a Mormon historian trained in historical methods, was discouraged from studying the incident, and she suffered some ostracism from fellow Mormons after its publication. Her work was acclaimed by historians, however, leading to her recognition as an exemplary historian of the American West and Mormonism. Her account of the massacre was eventually accepted by the Mormon leadership.

== Summary ==
The Mountain Meadows Massacre was the first work to fully document Mormon involvement in the massacre. In the book, Brooks demonstrated convincingly that the Mormon militia was responsible for the massacre, and that John D. Lee, the only militiaman executed, was effectively a scapegoat. She writes, "The church leaders decided to sacrifice Lee only when they could see that it would be impossible to acquit him without assuming a part of the responsibility themselves".

The work cleared Brigham Young of any direct involvement, but did blame him for his incendiary rhetoric. Brooks writes, "While Brigham Young and other church authorities did not specifically order the massacre, they did preach sermons and set up social conditions that made it possible." In Brooks' unflinching narrative, she painted the Massacre as an overreaction by the Mormon militia forces, one that was a tragedy for all sides, resulting in the death of settlers and the tarnishing of the name of the Church of Jesus Christ of Latter-day Saints.

On the role of her own grandfather Dudley Leavitt, Brooks seemed ambivalent. "We can only wonder as to Dudley's relation to the Massacre," Brooks wrote of him.

== Reception ==
Much to the consternation of some, Brooks called Young "an accessory after the fact," a charge that rankled church leaders. "What raised the wrath of loyal Mormons was the massive evidence she presented that Young's cover-up of the crime made him an accessory after the fact, and that he stage-managed the sacrifice of John D. Lee", writes historian Will Bagley in his Blood of the Prophets: Brigham Young and the Massacre at Mountain Meadows. "High-ranking LDS church officials especially resented her descriptions of actions that made them appear to be authoritarian bureaucrats obsessed with suppressing the truth."

Ultimately, as historian Wallace Stegner and other Brooks allies had predicted, Brooks's scrupulously researched book proved a boon to the LDS church through her careful limning of the challenges facing the church in its earliest days, as well as showing the toll the Massacre took on church members themselves. According to Jon Krakauer, Brooks's book, "is an extraordinary work of history, the seminal portrait of Mormondom under Brigham Young" and "In a very discernible sense, every book about the Mormon experience in nineteenth-century Utah published after 1950 is a response to Brooks's work."

"The book was understated but unrelenting," noted three Brigham Young University historians who authored Mormon History. "Brooks' honest examination of a topic many considered a taboo made The Mountain Meadows Massacre, like Brodie's book [No Man Knows My History (1945)], a milestone. Although its research and scholarly perspectives now seem dated, the book helped create a new climate of openness in Mormon studies."

After Brooks's work was published to critical acclaim, the modest former Utah schoolteacher, a graduate of New York's Columbia University, campaigned for a proper memorial to those killed. She was joined in her call for the monument by another descendant of Dudley Leavitt, businessman Dixie Leavitt, father of Utah politician Mike Leavitt, the former Secretary of Health and Human Services and once the state's governor.
