= Harold Schindler =

American historian (1929–1998)

- Born: Harold Moroni Schindler; December 6, 1929; Chicago, Illinois, U.S.
- Died: December 28, 1998 (aged 69); Salt Lake City, Utah, U.S.
- Occupations: Journalist, historian
- Spouse: Benita Nixdorf Schindler (m. 1956)
- Children: 3
- Parent(s): Moroni Helaman Nephi Schindler; Carolina Margaretta Strickstrock

Harold Moroni "Hal" Schindler (December 6, 1929 – December 28, 1998) was an American journalist and historian, known for his articles and books on the American west. Early in his career he also scripted episodes of the television series Death Valley Days and Gunsmoke. He is best known for his 1966 biography of 19th-century Latter-day Saint Orrin Porter Rockwell.

== Biography ==
Schindler was born in Chicago, Illinois to Moroni Helaman Nephi Schindler and Carolina Margaretta Strickstrock, who were German immigrants. Shortly afterward they moved to New York City, until 1940 when they moved to Salt Lake City, Utah. He married Benita "Bonnie" Nixdorf Schindler in 1956 and they had three children. He was a member of the Church of Jesus Christ of Latter-day Saints (LDS Church).

Schindler had a fifty-year journalism career with The Salt Lake Tribune. Starting as a copyboy in 1945, he rose through the ranks as a police reporter, humor writer, and spent 27 years as a television columnist. He was the editor of the Sunday Arts section and magazine. He also regularly covered Utah history and current events, producing articles in which he chronicled Utah's history leading to statehood. He used pioneer journals to create a series on the 150th anniversary of the Mormon pioneers' arrival in the Great Salt Lake Valley.

Schindler died of a heart attack in Salt Lake City on December 28, 1998.

== History and publications ==
Schindler's biography, Orrin Porter Rockwell: Man of God, Son of Thunder, is considered a definitive work on the Mormon stalwart and controversial lawman. Published in 1966 by the University of Utah Press, the biography has been reprinted in multiple editions to become its publisher's best-selling book ever. The book won an Award of Merit from the American Association for State and Local History.

Schindler produced an updated edition of West From Fort Bridger, an account of Western trails predating the Mormon exodus, with Utah historian Will Bagley. This edition revised and updated the work of the late Western historians J. Roderic Korns and Dale Morgan.

Schindler died while researching and writing a book on the Utah War.

== Publications ==
- In Another Time: Sketches of Utah History, Utah State University Press, 1998, ISBN 0-87421-242-1, ISBN 978-0-87421-242-6.
- Orrin Porter Rockwell: Man of God, Son of Thunder. University of Utah Press, 1966: Paperback, 1993. ISBN 0-87480-440-X
- Roderic Korns and Dale L. Morgan, eds., West from Fort Bridger: The Pioneering of Immigrant Trails across Utah, 1846–1850, revised and updated by Will Bagley and Harold Schindler, Logan: Utah State University Press, 1994.
