= Edward Bunker (Mormon) =

- Born: August 1, 1822; Atkinson, Maine, United States
- Died: November 17, 1901 (aged 79); Colonia Morelos, Sonora, Mexico
- Occupations: Pioneer, community founder
- Parent(s): Silas Bunker; Hannah Berry Bunker

Edward Bunker (August 1, 1822 – November 17, 1901) was a Mormon pioneer and community founder of Bunkerville, Nevada.

== Early life ==
Bunker was born in Atkinson, Maine, the youngest of Silas and Hannah Berry Bunker's nine children. As a teenager in the fall of 1841, he struck out on his own with his brother-in-law John Berry to Wisconsin "to see the country."

== Conversion to The Church of Jesus Christ of Latter Day Saints ==
Bunker did not make it to Wisconsin that winter. Because the rivers and lakes were frozen by the time they reached Ohio, he and John decided to visit a friend in Kirtland, Ohio. There, they met Martin Harris.

John and Bunker both read the Book of Mormon and Parley P. Pratt's A Voice of Warning. John eventually went to see members of his family in Pittsburgh, while Bunker remained in nearby Cleveland, attending meetings of the Church of Jesus Christ of Latter-day Saints (LDS Church) and being baptized in April 1845.

In the spring, Bunker and John finally made it to Wisconsin, but they soon left for Nauvoo, Illinois, with a letter of introduction to apostle George A. Smith.

== Nauvoo and Iowa ==
Bunker arrived in Nauvoo nearly a year after the death of Joseph Smith, at which time the Latter Day Saints were busily preparing to abandon Nauvoo. He worked briefly across the river in Montrose, Iowa, where he met Emily Abbott. They were married in Nauvoo in February 1846, just before the pioneers began their first long trek across Iowa.

Bunker and Emily soon left Nauvoo and traveled halfway across Iowa, helping to found the settlement at Garden Grove. He and a friend built a one-room log cabin and moved their wives into it. Bunker then went to Missouri with the intention of earning enough money to buy a team, a wagon, and supplies for the journey.

== Mormon Battalion ==
While he was in Missouri, Bunker heard about the call for volunteers to form the Mormon Battalion. He returned to Garden Grove and was one of the first to volunteer.

The Battalion marched to Santa Fe, Tucson, San Diego, and finally to Los Angeles, where Bunker finished the six months he had left in his tour of duty. He was discharged in July 1847.

Bunker then traveled north with other Battalion members to Sutter's Mill, where gold was discovered, and then to Salt Lake City, arriving on October 16, 1847. They stayed only briefly, and then set out for Winter Quarters, Nebraska to rejoin their families.

They had a very difficult journey, having left so late in the season. The Platte River was frozen, and they were reduced to eating rawhide saddles and a mule that fell through the ice before they reached Winter Quarters on December 18. Bunker spent the night with some friends, not realizing that Emily and their son had moved from Garden Grove to Winter Quarters and were nearby.

== Mormon pioneer ==
Bunker moved his family to Missouri to earn money for an outfit, and then to Mosquito Creek in Iowa, where he raised corn. He bought a team and wagon for his family, and with his mother-in-law and her two small sons, they emigrated in 1849. They settled in Ogden, Utah Territory, and he served on the first Weber Stake High Council of the LDS Church and Ogden's first city council.

When plural marriage began to be lived openly in 1852, Bunker took a second wife, Sarah Ann Browning Lang, a widow with two daughters.

Bunker was called on a mission to England in 1852, and he presided over the Bristol, Sheffield, Bradford, Lincolnshire, and Scotland conferences of the LDS Church.

On the way home from his mission, Bunker led a handcart company to the Salt Lake Valley in 1856, arriving just before the early winter set in that trapped the Martin and Willie handcart companies in Wyoming.

Bunker returned to Ogden, serving as a bishop there for several years. In April 1861, he married a third wife, 14-year-old Scottish immigrant Mary McQuarrie.

Bunker pioneered again in Santa Clara, Utah. This was one of the most difficult settlements because the pioneers were repeatedly washed out by floods of the Virgin River and the Santa Clara River. They also had to deal with extremes of heat and drought. He served as the bishop in Santa Clara for 12 years.

Bunker, on his own initiative but with permission from Brigham Young, moved his large polygamous family 25 miles southwest to Bunkerville after the settlers in Santa Clara had failed to live the communitarian United Order. The residents of Bunkerville, so named by Brigham Young, shared the work and the fruits of their work, with all land being held in common.

In 1892, Bunker was called before an LDS Church high council in St. George to discuss his public opposition to the Adam–God doctrine. After submitting his arguments to the council (and eventually, the President of the Church), he was told that his teachings were incorrect and that he should stop creating contention in the Mormon community. Despite this period of defiance, by 1900, he had been ordained a patriarch in the church.

In October 1901, at the age of 79, Bunker went to help found the Mormon colony at Colonia Morelos, Sonora, Mexico. He died there on November 17, 1901.
