= Blood of the Prophets =

2002 book by Will Bagley

Blood of the Prophets: Brigham Young and the Massacre at Mountain Meadows
- Author: Will Bagley
- Language: English
- Subject: Mountain Meadows massacre
- Genre: Non-fiction
- Publisher: University of Oklahoma Press
- Publication date: September 2002
- Publication place: United States
- Media type: Print (Hardcover)
- Pages: 544
- ISBN: 0-8061-3426-7

Blood of the Prophets: Brigham Young and the Massacre at Mountain Meadows (2002) by Will Bagley is a history of the Mountain Meadows massacre. The work updated Juanita Brooks' seminal history The Mountain Meadows Massacre, and remains one of the definitive works on the topic.

== Awards and praise ==
- Spur Award, Western Writers of America
- Caughey Book Prize, Western History Association
- Caroline Bancroft History Prize, Denver Public Library
- Co-Founders Best Book Award, Westerners International.
- 2003 Best Book Award, John Whitmer Historical Association

Brigham D. Madsen, a fellow Utah historian, wrote: “While the word ‘definitive’ is often overused, this account of the killings merits that distinction. Bagley’s book ranks as a Mormon historical classic.”, Western Historical Quarterly.

The New York Review of Books praised the work as “an exhaustive, meticulously documented, highly readable history that captures the events and atmosphere that gave rise to the massacre, as well as its long, tortuous aftermath. Bagley has taken great care in negotiating the minefield presented by what remains of the historical record.”

== Criticism ==
The book has received strong criticism from Mormon groups. The Foundation for Ancient Research and Mormon Studies at Brigham Young University criticized Bagley's conclusion that Brigham Young ordered the massacre. For example, FARMS alleges that Bagley misused a quote, written by Dimick B. Huntington, in which the Piedes Indians told Brigham Young they were "afraid to fight the Americans & so would raise grain" during the Utah War. Bagley replaced the word "grain" with "allies" as an interpolation, so as to read "afraid to fight the Americans & so would raise allies", and published this revision in Blood of the Prophets. It has also been claimed that some of Bagley's more controversial conclusions can only be reached by using a flawed timeline of events.

Some Mormon historians feel that, since Will Bagley was hired by California businessman Frank James Singer to "rewrite the story of the Mountain Meadows Massacre," this may have influenced his interpretation of the facts, a charge Bagley denies.

== Editions ==
- 2002: Norman, University of Oklahoma Press.
