= Ira Hatch =

American Mormon missionary

Ira Hatch (August 5, 1835 – September 30, 1909) was an American Mormon missionary. He spoke 13 languages and spent most of his life working with the Native Americans of Southern Utah, New Mexico, and Arizona. One of Hatch's wives was Miraboots, also known as Sarah Dyson, who was a Paiute. He was one of the founding fathers of Ramah, New Mexico.

Hatch was the son of Ira Sterns Hatch who had joined the Church of Jesus Christ of Latter Day Saints in Kirtland, Ohio. Hatch was born in Farmersville, Cattaraugus County, New York.

Hatch was among the first missionaries sent to proselytize in the Southern Indian Mission in 1854. In 1858, Hatch was among the missionaries sent to work with the Native Americans along the Muddy River in Nevada. That year Hatch was also among the first Mormon missionaries to the Hopi. In 1862, Hatch was involved in another mission to the Hopi. He was one of three missionaries left behind when Jacob Hamblin led the rest of the missionaries north.

In 1866, during Utah's Black Hawk War Hatch led a group that visited the Shebits and Kiabab bands of Indians.

On one occasion, Hatch was serving a mission among the Mojave people with Dudley Leavitt. The Mojave were going to kill Hatch and Leavitt, but Hatch offered a prayer for the people's hearts to be softened and they let Hatch and Leavitt go. As recounted in the autobiography of Jacob Hamblin.

Hatch was later among those who served as a missionary among the Navajo, basing his efforts out of Ramah, New Mexico. In 1871 Hatch served as Erastus Snow's interpreter during a visit to the Navajo.

Blaine Yorgason has written To Soar with the Eagle (1993) a novel based on the story of Ira Hatch and Maraboot.
