= Charles Kelly (historian) =

American historian (1889–1971)

- Born: February 3, 1889; Cedar Springs, Michigan, U.S.
- Died: April 19, 1971 (aged 82)
- Education: Valparaiso University
- Occupation: Historian
- Spouse: Harriett Greener
- Parent(s): Alfred Kelly; Flora Lepard

Charles Kelly (February 3, 1889 – April 19, 1971) was an American historian of the American west whose work focused on activities in the western salt desert of Utah and Nevada during the pioneer period (Bagley, p. vii). Kelly also served as the first superintendent of Capitol Reef National Monument (now Capitol Reef National Park) in Southern Utah. Kelly was named an Honorary Life Member of the Utah State Historical Society in 1960. In 1969 he received an Award of Merit from the American Association of State and Local History.

Kelly was considered a careful rather than a brilliant writer, and his works have been more critically addressed and reevaluated in recent years. He loved western history, especially as it touched Utah, Having seen all that country again I am satisfied to live in Utah, as I believe there is more of interest to see around here than any other place in the world. . . . (Journal of Charles Kelly, Charles Kelly Papers, 1918–1971, Utah State Historical Society, entry dated 24 July 1929)

== Biography ==
Born in Cedar Springs, Michigan, on February 3, 1889, the son of itinerant Baptist preacher Alfred Kelly and Flora Lepard, Kelly grew up in many areas of the United States. By 1910 Kelly had left his wandering family and enrolled at Valparaiso University, an independent Lutheran university in Indiana for three years, but did not complete a course due to lack of funds. Kelly served in the United States army during World War I. As he had learned as a child to set the type used to print religious tracts, he worked as a printer in several cities, and then settled in Salt Lake City, Utah. He played the violin and cornet and initially sought a musical career. But Kelly eventually returned to the printing business and became a partner in the Western Printing Company until 1940. Shortly after his arrival in Salt Lake, he married Harriett Greener. They had no children.

Kelly attributed his personal efforts as a painter, and his friendship with the western artist Charles M. Russell, as a source of his interest in western history. Kelly wrote of a 1929 experience:

Prowling the desert for subject material I accidentally stumbled onto the old Donner Trail on the Salt Desert. No one here knew anything about it; so I began doing some research, out of curiosity, and found that historical research--especially in this section--was much more fascinating that either of the other two hobbies. (Pony Express Courier, June, 1937, p. 2)

In 1940 Kelly sold his interest in the printing business and took an unpaid position as sole caretaker of Capitol Reef. The timber and adobe house near Fruita, Utah, which came with the position, provided Kelly and his wife a home while he researched and wrote. Kelly produced many articles for journals and periodicals, conducted research for projects by other historians, and engaged in a voluminous correspondence with others working in western history, including Dale Morgan and J. Roderic Korns.

Kelly's position safeguarding Capitol Reef extended into a twenty-year-long second career when, in 1950, he received a civil service appointment as the Monument's first superintendent. During the 1950s Kelly was deeply troubled when NPS management acceded to demands of the U.S. Atomic Energy Commission that Capitol Reef National Monument be opened to uranium prospecting. He felt that the decision had been a mistake and destructive of the long term national interest. Ultimately, however, there was not enough ore within the monument to be worth mining. With the transfer of Park Ranger Grant Clark from Zion National Park in 1958, Kelly finally received additional permanent help to protect the monument and enforce regulations. The year Clark arrived, fifty-six thousand visitors came to the park.

Kelly retired in 1959 to Salt Lake City, where he lived until his death in 1971. Harriett Greener Kelly died in 1974.

== Personal philosophy ==
While insightful and dynamic as a historian, Kelly was generally regarded as a difficult personality. He was highly critical of those who championed industrial development in the west, including Utah's Governor George D. Clyde, and vigorously defended the preservation of scenic areas in Utah and the intermountain west.

Kelly's early political positions can be viewed as extreme. During the early 1920s, he briefly held a position with the Ku Klux Klan in Salt Lake and wrote about his anti-Semitic views. He was emphatically unreligious and attacked religion in writing. He blamed this a trait on his father's example:

If I were convinced that I possessed an immortal soul; if I had positive proof of the existence of heaven and hell, and if I were given a choice of abode after leaving this earthly sphere; I would ten thousand times rather spend eternity in an atmosphere of flaming sulphur and brimstone in company with honest sinners than to twang a harp, wear a crown and walk the golden streets of paradise with father and those other religious hypocrites who made life for us a hell on earth. (Autobiography, p. 221, held in Charles Kelly Papers, 1918-1971, Utah State Historical Society)

On a personal level Kelly was considered kind and generous and had a number of loyal friends, but was often described as a misanthrope. In a brief autobiographical piece for Pony Express Courier, he wrote about himself:

I belong to no organizations of any kind whatever, never go out socially, not interested in politics, and hate radios. I really ought to move to California, but if I did the Mormons would say they ran me out of Utah--so I stay just to spite them. (Pony Express Courier, June, 1937)

== Publications ==
- Salt Desert Trails (1930) (OCLC 4994041)
- Holy Murder: The Story of Porter Rockwell (1934) (OCLC 1832387)
- Old Greenwood, The Story of Caleb Greenwood, Trapper, Pathfinder and Early Pioneer of the West. (1936) (OCLC 4971446)
- Miles Goodyear, First Citizen of Utah, Trapper, Trader and California Pioneer (1937) OCLC 13851907
- The Outlaw Trail: A History of Butch Cassidy and his Wild Bunch (1938) (OCLC 1810708)

Kelly also edited several period journals for publication, including that of Mormon pioneer John D. Lee (1938), and wrote articles and book reviews related to Western history. He famously posed for a picture thumbing his nose at the Mormon monument to the Mountain Meadows Massacre, claiming that Lee was a scapegoat and that higher-ups were responsible.
