= Bunkerville, Nevada =

Unincorporated town in the State of Nevada, United States

- Census-designated place
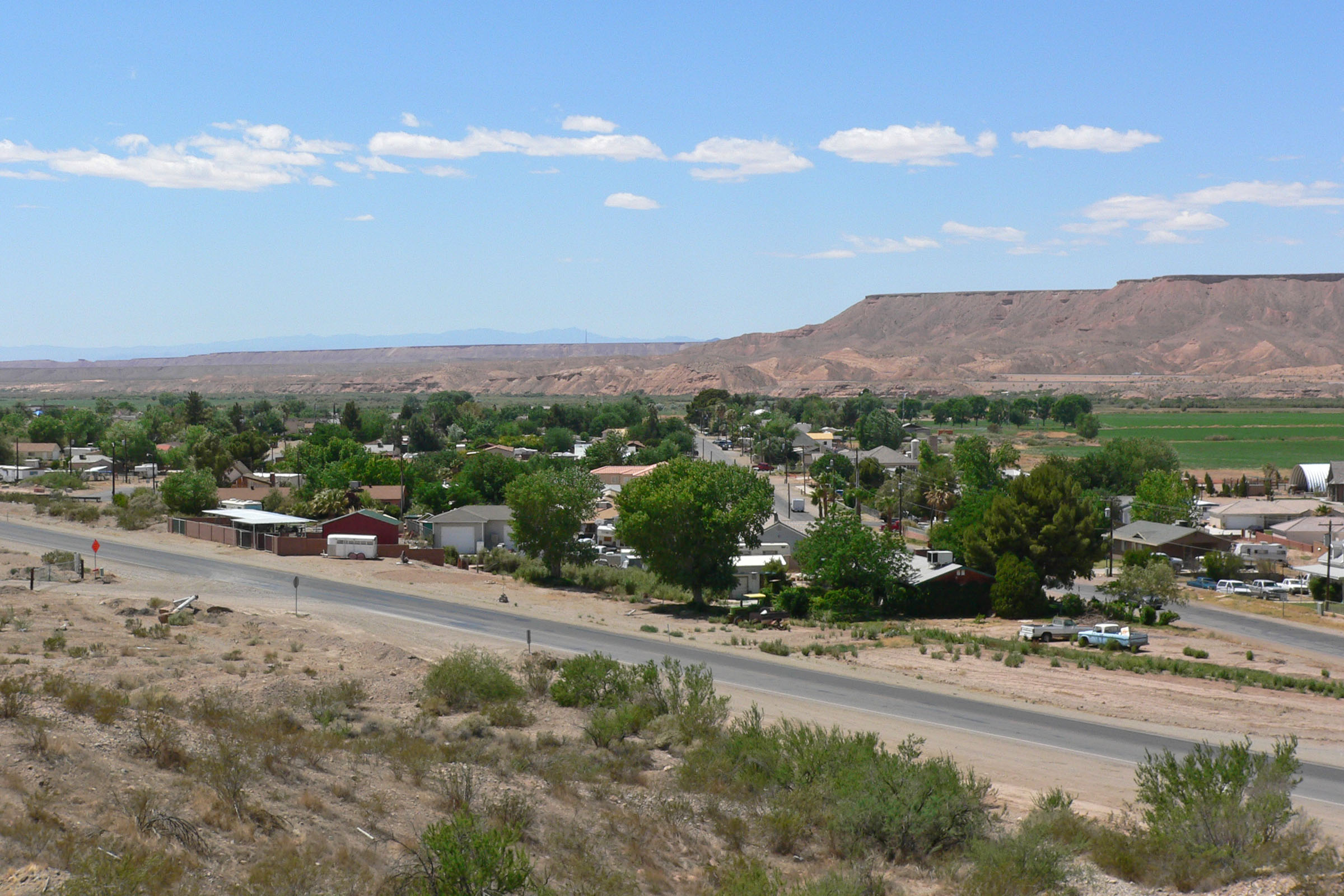

- Location of Bunkerville in Clark County, Nevada

- Location in the United States
- Coordinates: 36°45′55″N 114°8′11″W
- Country: United States
- State: Nevada
- County: Clark
- Settled: 1877
- Founder: Edward Bunker

Area
  - Total: 10.91 sq mi (28.25 km^{2})
  - Land: 10.33 sq mi (26.75 km^{2})
  - Water: 0.58 sq mi (1.50 km^{2})
- Elevation: 1,532 ft (467 m)

Population (2020)
  - Total: 1,069
  - Density: 103.5/sq mi (39.96/km^{2})
- Time zone: UTC-8 (PST)
  - Summer (DST): UTC-7 (PDT)
- ZIP code: 89007
- Area codes: 702 and 725
- FIPS code: 32-08100
- GNIS feature ID: 0845390
- Website: Bunkerville Town Advisory Board Homepage

Bunkerville is an unincorporated town and census-designated place in Clark County, Nevada, United States. The population was 1,069 at the 2020 census.

== Geography ==
According to the United States Census Bureau, the census-designated place of Bunkerville (which may not coincide exactly with the town boundaries) has a total area of 43.3 square miles (112.1 km^{2}), of which 42.8 square miles (110.8 km^{2}) is land and 0.50 square miles (1.3 km^{2}), or 1.12%, is water.

=== Climate ===
Bunkerville has a hot desert climate (Köppen: BWh), with cool winters and very hot summers.

Climate data for Bunkerville, Nevada, 1991–2020 normals, extremes 1979–present
| Month | Jan | Feb | Mar | Apr | May | Jun | Jul | Aug | Sep | Oct | Nov | Dec | Year |
|---|---|---|---|---|---|---|---|---|---|---|---|---|---|
| Record high °F (°C) | 78 (26) | 90 (32) | 100 (38) | 100 (38) | 112 (44) | 122 (50) | 122 (50) | 118 (48) | 115 (46) | 107 (42) | 95 (35) | 76 (24) | 122 (50) |
| Mean daily maximum °F (°C) | 59.8 (15.4) | 64.8 (18.2) | 72.9 (22.7) | 80.6 (27.0) | 90.4 (32.4) | 101.2 (38.4) | 106.2 (41.2) | 104.5 (40.3) | 97.0 (36.1) | 83.7 (28.7) | 68.9 (20.5) | 58.7 (14.8) | 82.4 (28.0) |
| Daily mean °F (°C) | 45.0 (7.2) | 49.7 (9.8) | 56.2 (13.4) | 63.2 (17.3) | 72.9 (22.7) | 81.9 (27.7) | 88.6 (31.4) | 87.4 (30.8) | 78.4 (25.8) | 65.7 (18.7) | 52.6 (11.4) | 43.9 (6.6) | 65.5 (18.6) |
| Mean daily minimum °F (°C) | 30.2 (−1.0) | 34.7 (1.5) | 39.6 (4.2) | 45.9 (7.7) | 55.4 (13.0) | 62.6 (17.0) | 70.9 (21.6) | 70.2 (21.2) | 59.8 (15.4) | 47.7 (8.7) | 36.3 (2.4) | 29.0 (−1.7) | 48.5 (9.2) |
| Record low °F (°C) | 11 (−12) | 11 (−12) | 20 (−7) | 23 (−5) | 31 (−1) | 41 (5) | 44 (7) | 42 (6) | 26 (−3) | 20 (−7) | 12 (−11) | 11 (−12) | 11 (−12) |
| Average precipitation inches (mm) | 0.80 (20) | 0.86 (22) | 0.62 (16) | 0.30 (7.6) | 0.13 (3.3) | 0.13 (3.3) | 0.29 (7.4) | 0.69 (18) | 0.35 (8.9) | 0.61 (15) | 0.51 (13) | 0.64 (16) | 5.93 (151) |
| Average precipitation days (≥ 0.01 in) | 3.1 | 3.8 | 2.7 | 1.7 | 0.7 | 0.4 | 1.3 | 2.0 | 1.2 | 2.2 | 1.7 | 2.1 | 22.9 |
Source: NOAA

== History ==
Bunkerville was settled in 1877 by Mormon pioneers from Utah. It is named after Edward Bunker, who was already a seasoned pioneer settler before he came to Bunkerville, having pioneered the settlement at Santa Clara, Utah.

Bunker, on his own initiative but with permission from Brigham Young, moved his large polygamous family 25 miles (40 km) southwest to Bunkerville after the settlers in Santa Clara had failed to live the communitarian United Order. The residents of Bunkerville, so named by Brigham Young, established a new communal effort, sharing the work and the fruits of their work, with all land being held in common. The communal experiment ended in 1880.

According to the Federal Writers' Project, Bunkerville had 287 inhabitants in 1941.

In the 1950s, Bunkerville was downwind of nuclear test sites, which caused a spike in childhood leukemia and other cancers in the region. Residents recall playing in nuclear fallout as if it were snow, and report a lasting mistrust of the government.

In the spring of 2014, Bunkerville was the scene of the Bundy standoff, an armed confrontation between protesters and law enforcement over the non-payment of the grazing fees by Cliven Bundy, a local rancher.

== Demographics ==
Historical population
| Census | Pop. | Note | %± |
|---|---|---|---|
| 2000 | 1,014 | | — |
| 2010 | 1,303 | | 28.5% |
| 2020 | 1,069 | | −18.0% |
U.S. Decennial Census

Bunkerville CDP, Nevada – Racial composition Note: the US Census treats Hispanic/Latino as an ethnic category. This table excludes Latinos from the racial categories and assigns them to a separate category. Hispanics/Latinos may be of any race.
| Race (NH = Non-Hispanic) | % 2020 | % 2010 | % 2000 | Pop 2020 | Pop 2010 | Pop 2000 |
|---|---|---|---|---|---|---|
| White alone (NH) | 67.3% | 69.3% | 69.9% | 719 | 903 | 709 |
| Black alone (NH) | 0.7% | 0.8% | 0.7% | 8 | 11 | 7 |
| American Indian alone (NH) | 0% | 0.1% | 0% | 0 | 1 | 0 |
| Asian alone (NH) | 0.6% | 0.2% | 1.9% | 6 | 2 | 19 |
| Pacific Islander alone (NH) | 0% | 0.8% | 0.6% | 0 | 11 | 6 |
| Other race alone (NH) | 0% | 0% | 0% | 0 | 0 | 0 |
| Multiracial (NH) | 5.1% | 1.6% | 2.1% | 54 | 21 | 21 |
| Hispanic/Latino (any race) | 26.4% | 27.2% | 24.9% | 282 | 354 | 252 |

The most reported ancestries in 2020 were English (25.5%), Mexican (22.9%), German (5.4%), Irish (5.1%), Scottish (2.8%), Italian (2.5%), and Swedish (2.2%).

As of the census of 2000, there were 1,014 people, 258 households, and 222 families residing in the CDP. The population density was 23.6 inhabitants per square mile (9.1/km^{2}). There were 277 housing units at an average density of 6.4 per square mile (2.5/km^{2}). The racial makeup of the CDP was 75.15% White, 0.69% African American, 1.87% Asian, 0.59% Pacific Islander, 15.68% from other races, and 6.02% from two or more races. Hispanic or Latino of any race were 24.85% of the population.

There were 258 households, out of which 54.7% had children under the age of 18 living with them, 72.9% were married couples living together, 10.5% had a female householder with no husband present, and 13.6% were non-families. 11.6% of all households were made up of individuals, and 5.8% had someone living alone who was 65 years of age or older. The average household size was 3.93 and the average family size was 4.27.

In the CDP, the population was spread out, with 41.9% under the age of 18, 9.5% from 18 to 24, 26.5% from 25 to 44, 15.8% from 45 to 64, and 6.3% who were 65 years of age or older. The median age was 24 years. For every 100 females, there were 99.2 males. For every 100 females age 18 and over, there were 99.7 males.

The median income for a household in the CDP was $45,076, and the median income for a family was $46,098. Males had a median income of $27,153 versus $20,878 for females. The per capita income for the CDP was $16,820. About 3.6% of families and 7.9% of the population were below the poverty line, including 13.4% of those under age 18 and 8.9% of those age 65 or over.

== Education ==
Bunkerville has a public library, a branch of the Las Vegas-Clark County Library District.

== Notable people ==
- Juanita Brooks (1898–1989), born in Bunkerville; Mormon writer, editor, historian, descendant of Bunkerville pioneer Dudley Leavitt
- Ammon Bundy (born 1975), son of Cliven Bundy and leader of the 2016 occupation of the Malheur National Wildlife Refuge
- Cliven Bundy (born 1946), cattle rancher involved in the Bundy standoff
- Edward Bunker (1822–1901), Mormon pioneer for whom Bunkerville is named
- Dixie L. Leavitt (1929–2026), Utah state legislator and businessman, lived in Bunkerville

== See also ==
- List of census-designated places in Nevada
