= Dudley Leavitt (Mormon pioneer) =

American Mormon leader (1830–1908)

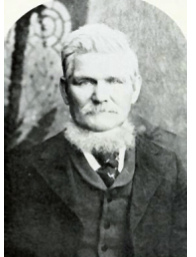
- Leavitt c. 1880

Personal details
- Born: August 31, 1830; Hatley, Quebec
- Died: October 15, 1908 (aged 78); Bunkerville, Nevada
- Occupation: Patriarch

Dudley Leavitt (August 31, 1830 – October 15, 1908) was an early patriarch of the Church of Jesus Christ of Latter-day Saints (LDS Church), a Mormon pioneer and an early settler in southern Utah.

== Biography ==
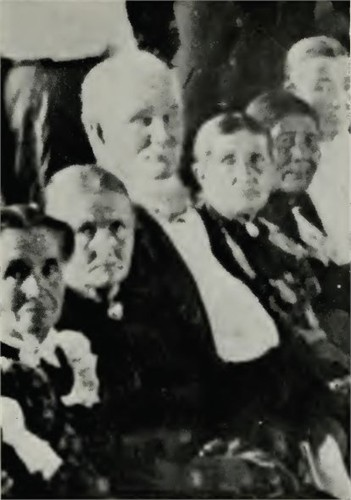
Leavitt and his wives, circa 1880.

Leavitt was born in Hatley, Quebec, Canada on August 31, 1830. Although born in Canada, he came from a long line of early New Englanders. He was named for his ancestor Thomas Dudley, the founder of Cambridge, Massachusetts, and second colonial governor of Massachusetts. His ancestor John Leavitt, an early Massachusetts Puritan, was deacon of Old Ship Church in Hingham, Massachusetts, when it was built in the 17th century.

Leavitt crossed the Great Plains on the Mormon trail as a young man. He was a member of the 1850 Milo Andrus Company, which left the outfitting post at Kanesville, Iowa (present day Council Bluffs) on June 3 and arrived in Salt Lake Valley on August 30, 1850. He is credited as one of the founders of settlements in Washington County, Utah.

While Leavitt is cited in Jon Krakauer's bestseller, Under the Banner of Heaven, as a participant in the Mountain Meadows massacre of 1857, Leavitt is said to have never discussed the massacre, except to have remarked later in life, "I thank God that these old hands have never been stained by human blood." His granddaughter Juanita Brooks later investigated the Massacre, writing the seminal The Mountain Meadows Massacre. On the role of her grandfather, Brooks seemed ambivalent. "We can only wonder as to Dudley's relation to the Massacre," Brooks wrote of him. Brooks also devoted a book to her ancestor entitled On the Ragged Edge: The Life and Times of Dudley Leavitt.

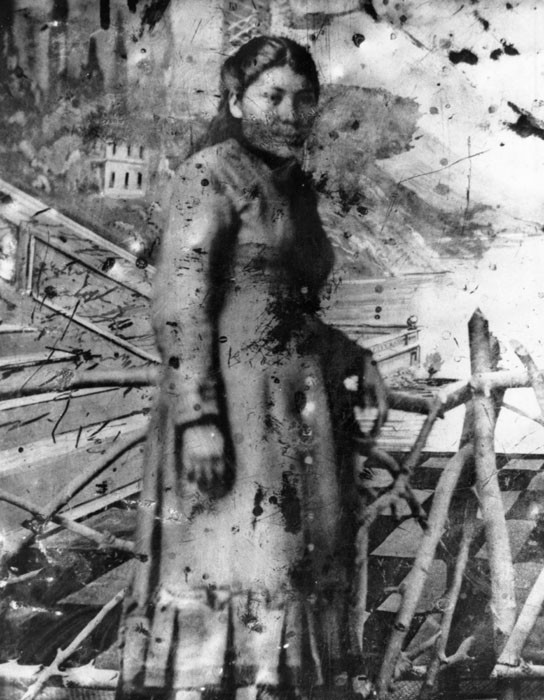
Native American Jeanette Smith married Leavitt in 1860.

Later in his life, Leavitt became pivotal in dealing with the Indian tribes of southern Utah on behalf of the Mormon settlers. He was credited by Brooks for having intervened with the Indians in Southern Utah, preventing an attack on non-Mormon settlers. Leavitt married several wives and spent a decade hiding from federal officers seeking to apprehend polygamists. One of his wives Jeanette Smith was native American.

Leavitt died in Bunkerville, Nevada, near Mesquite, on October 15, 1908. Although polygamy had been outlawed, he never abandoned his several families, according to historians.

== Notable descendants ==
- Juanita Brooks
- Mike Leavitt
- Cliven Bundy

== See also ==
- Ira Hatch
