= Dale Morgan =

American historian

Lowell Dale Morgan (December 18, 1914 – March 30, 1971), generally cited as Dale Morgan or Dale L. Morgan, was an American historian, accomplished researcher, biographer, editor, and critic. He specialized in material on Utah history, Mormon history, the American fur trade, and overland trails. His work is known both for its comprehensive research and accuracy and for the fluid imagery of his prose.

Morgan was forced by post-lingual deafness as an early teen to communicate by letters throughout his professional life. This effort created a written network for scholars interested in Western American themes. Vast stores of correspondence indicate his willingness to help another writer or scholar, to provide information on sources and materials, or offer advice on projects. Many emerging scholars, particularly those out of the academic mainstream, considered him a mentor. As a result, Morgan stood in the center of a scholarly group of literary figures of the 1930s through 1960s involved in history and biography of the American West. These individuals included Juanita Brooks, Fawn Brodie, Bernard DeVoto, Charles Kelly, J. Roderic Korns, A. Russell Mortensen, William Mulder, and Harold Schindler.

== Early life ==
Morgan was born in Salt Lake City, Utah in 1914 and spent his childhood and young adulthood in the city. He was the oldest of the four children of James Lowell Morgan and Emily Holmes. His father, James Morgan died of appendicitis when Dale Morgan was only five years old. To raise her children, Emily Morgan returned to college to upgrade her normal certificate to a college degree and worked until her retirement as an elementary school teacher.

A promising and intelligent youth, Morgan contracted meningitis in August 1929. The disease left him with a total loss of hearing. Emily Morgan kept him home from school for an entire year, hoping that some hearing would return. Deafness cut off his ability to relate to people around him. The once popular, social, and athletic boy became socially introverted, devoting much of his time to reading and study. Morgan recalled that he had not yet reconciled himself to his deafness by the time he returned to school. In 1951, in a letter to Marguerite Sinclair Reusser, he wrote that a minor family crisis in March 1931 led to a hysterical outburst. During this emotional time, Morgan finally confided in his mother the difficulties and fears he had faced over the loss of his hearing. "I began to face the future instead of wasting myself in bitter regret over a past that was beyond my reach. That was the beginning of my adjustment to the fact that my hearing was gone and would probably never return." At this time, he began a lifelong pattern of writing, producing thousands of careful transcriptions, personal letters, and books in his field.

Morgan learned and became quite competent in lip reading, but was never comfortable with the inaccuracy and ambiguity of the method. His friends noted that he could speak quite clearly but typically chose not to do so unless among people he knew well. Deafness gave him no way to regulate his voice and his conversation was locked in a high-pitched monotone. Instead he typically turned to communicating in writing, carrying on personal conversations with the use of note cards, the backs of letters, scratch paper, and other handy paper. Archivist and historiographer Gary Topping noted that "...because Morgan’s deafness shifted his communication with the external world entirely to the written world, his world became a literary world, and the long hours of practice with the written world turned him into a virtuosos of English prose in the same way that musical practice produces virtuosity."^{:118} As an adult his publication manuscripts exhibit heavy revisions and editing, while his letters flow through his manual typewriters and onto paper as seemingly seamless compositions, almost without typographic error.

The advent of the Depression, and Morgan's deafness, reduced his ability to find employment after graduation from high school. However, an admiring English teacher found college funds for him in a vocational rehabilitation program. From 1933 to 1937, Morgan studied commercial art at the University of Utah, taking advantage of known talents and a personal interest in drawing and graphic layout. However, he found his personal interests drawn to literary studies and writing. He was a contributor to the student newspaper, the Daily Chronicle, and added to his writing experience by contributing creative work to The Pen, the student literary publication. At college he developed a close association with other students who would be recognized for history and literature. These included future historian Helen Zeese (later Papanikolas), and Ray Benedict West Jr. Two important relationships were formed with Daily Chronicle editor Richard Scowcroft and faculty advisor Wallace Stegner. Both men became novelists and operated the respected writing programme at Stanford University.

== Career as historian ==
In 1937, with the country still in the Depression, Morgan was unable to find a position in commercial art and occupied spare time as an occasional book reviewer for a city newspaper, the Salt Lake Tribune. In August 1938, again helped by a tip and recommendation from a friend, Morgan capitalized on his career as a reviewer to join the Utah Historical Records Survey as a part-time editor and publicist. Within a short time his ability to remember and associate facts brought him into a front-row position writing for the HRS. By 1940 he was transferred to the Utah Writers' Project to complete the state guidebook. Later he became director of the state branch of the Federal Writers Project.

In these New Deal relief programs, Morgan honed his skills in research and organization. He acquired a deep understanding of primary source material and information retrieval from his work in the library of the Church of Jesus Christ of Latter-day Saints. Within months, he was a major figure in the survey of state and county records, organizing much of the work and completing the writing of surveys done for state and county archives. By 1940 he was overseeing both programs, and by 1942 had supervised the production of histories of Ogden and Provo as well as acting as a primary writer of The WPA Guide To Utah. His work was well received by his superiors in the east and by local historians. Also in 1940, Morgan published the first substantive historical study of the Provisional State of Deseret in the Utah Historical Quarterly, analyzing primary documents dealing with the State of Deseret, including the constitution and early ordinances of the state, with a lengthy editorial introduction explaining their context. He also was involved in other writing projects, including the state contribution to a history of grazing in the western U.S. During this time he began exchanging correspondence with two women who would become well-respected writers, Juanita Brooks and Fawn M. Brodie. Morgan contributed substantively to the work of each as a mentor, critic, and advocate.

In 1942, unable to serve in the armed forces, Morgan moved to Washington, D.C., and worked in the central office of a war-time regulatory agency, the Office of Price Administration. While there, his free time was spent using the relatively new National Archives and the Library of Congress, combing through federal records, reading methodically through hundreds of American newspapers and printed materials. This work netted him large files of typed transcriptions on Mormons, trans-Mississippi Native Americans, the activities of fur traders of the 1820s through 1840s, and exploration. Working in these institutions, Morgan standardized and honed his skill as a researcher.

Morgan had arrived in Washington, D.C., with the idea of eventually producing an authoritative history of early Mormonism. In 1945 he was awarded a post-service Guggenheim Foundation research grant, which he activated in 1947. He left Washington, D.C., and continued his research in New York and New England as well as along the Mormon Trail through Ohio, Missouri, and Illinois, and into California. In late 1947, again in Utah and desperately needing paying work, Morgan agreed to edit the Utah Historical Quarterly, publishing the journals of the John Wesley Powell expeditions of 1869-72 between 1947 and 1949. Of necessity Morgan acted as an independent historian between 1947 and 1952. During these years, he narrowed his focus to an intended three-volume history of Mormonism, but maintained his interest in the American fur trade and exploration. After leaving Utah again for Washington, D.C., in 1949 and the cancellation of his Mormon-book contract in 1952, Morgan turned to other aspects of the American West and produced several authoritative books on the West still regarded as definitive, including Jedediah Smith and the Opening of the West (1953), and three bibliographies of Mormon sects.

Morgan was retained by the University of California's Bancroft Library director George P. Hammond as a researcher for the Hopi-Navajo land claim lawsuit in 1953. In 1954 an appointment as an editor and research assistant at the Bancroft ended Morgan's precarious but productive years as an independent writer and pulled him to the West Coast. In California, his work and attention was drawn more fully into overland trail and California history. During his tenure at Bancroft he wrote or edited some forty books including the edited collection of documents in Overland in 1846 (1963) and The West of William H. Ashley (1964), as well as producing well received articles and reviews. He was named a Fellow of the Utah State Historical Society in 1960 and received the Henry Raup Wagner Award in 1961. Morgan received a second Guggenheim fellowship in 1970 to support research toward a history of the American fur trade, which he never began. Morgan died of cancer in 1971 at the age of fifty-six.

Later researchers have benefited from Dale Morgan's painstaking scholarship, extensive collection of correspondence, and reams of transcripts. He was the moving force behind the first unified catalogue of works about Mormonism, which he proposed to the Utah State Historical Society in 1951. Using Morgan's list, which had been re-typed and supplemented as a card file, Brigham Young University librarian Chad J. Flake completed and published A Mormon Bibliography, 1830–1930 (1978), with an introduction written by Morgan. Now in a second edition, it remains an indispensable reference work for scholars looking at Mormon history or sociology. Morgan's papers are at the Bancroft Library; most of his research library now forms part of the holdings of L. Tom Perry Special Collections at Brigham Young University.

The Utah State Historical Society has established the annual "Dale L. Morgan Award," presented to the author of the best scholarly article published in the Utah Historical Quarterly.

== Skills, viewpoint, and criticism ==
Morgan was a great-grandson of Orson Pratt, an apostle of the Church of Jesus Christ of Latter-day Saints (LDS Church), and Morgan's family actively participated in church activities. His sudden deafness, however, caused him to drift from the LDS faith, and he did not affiliate with any religious organization as an adult. Morgan has been described by others as a "thorough going atheist." He was profoundly affected by the soft positivism of 1930s social psychology and took a stance for historicism. Having rejected any religious motive as impossible, Morgan insisted that his work in western history and Mormonism present a completely-objective, exclusively-naturalistic viewpoint on religious matters, and he encouraged other Utah and western historians to follow his example. In 1943, writing to S. A. Burgess, a historian of the Reorganized Church of Jesus Christ of Latter Day Saints (now Community of Christ), Morgan said that his "viewpoint about Mormon history is that of the sociologist, the psychologist, the political, economic, and social historian." Historian of the Latter Day Saint movement Jan Shipps credits Morgan, along with three other notable historians (Bernard DeVoto, Fawn McKay Brodie, and Juanita Brooks), with establishing a basis for the new historiography of Mormonism through significant Mormon-related works in the 1940s and 1950s.

Morgan's intellectual experience in the federal WPA programs had both advantages and disadvantages for him as a historian. The independent nature of the programs encouraged his critical judgment and work ethic, forced him to work with a variety of people, and exposed him to a wide training ground on source development and research. However, it did not lead him to consider the larger meaning of the facts that he gathered or to understand the philosophy and theory of history, as taught in an academic setting. In fact, during the trials of his career, he became quite antagonistic to academic requirements. In response to a negative academic review of a work by his friend DeVoto, he wrote that "the term ‘history’ had better be redefined to mean, ’a species of writing produced by or enroute to a Ph.D.’ I have had enough troubles trying to break a path alongside this main-traveled road to know something of the snobberies at work here, and the ways in which the academic world and even the world of learning are geared to these attitudes."

According to Topping, this lack of perspective and understanding led Morgan to believe "that historical facts contain their own meaning, and that the historian’s intellect ought to be active only in internal and external criticism, establishing the authenticity and credibility of sources, yet passive when it came to establishing the larger significance …" As a result, Morgan "fell short of the interpretive potential of (his) sources...asserting that the facts would somehow convey their own meaning without any help from him...." However the same focus on fact, coupled to a spectacular memory for detail, allowed him to produce work of breathtaking detail and scope within the field. His strength and greatest contribution was as a documentary, rather than synthetic, historian.

== Symposium on Morgan ==
In August 1985, Sunstone offered a segment on Dale Morgan and Mormon History as part of their annual symposium in Salt Lake City, Utah. Historian William Mulder, a friend of Morgan, presented the segment.

== Selected publications ==
- The State of Deseret (1940)
- Utah: A Guide to the State (1941)
- The Humboldt: Highroad of the West (1943)
- The Great Salt Lake (1947)
- Jedediah Smith and the Opening of the West (1953)
- Overland in 1846: Diaries and Letters of the California-Oregon Trail (1963)
- The West of William H. Ashley (1964)

=== With other writers and editors ===
- West from Fort Bridger: The Pioneering of the Immigrant Trails across Utah, 1846–1850 original diaries and journals edited and with introductions by J. Roderic Korns and Dale L. Morgan; originally published 1951. Revised and updated by Will Bagley and Harold Schindler. Publisher: Logan, Utah: Utah State University Press, 1994. ISBN 0-87421-178-6.
- Shoshonean Peoples and the Overland Trails: Frontiers of the Utah Superintendency of Indian Affairs ed. Richard L. Saunders. Publisher: Logan, Utah: Utah State University Press, 2007. ISBN 978-0-87421-651-6
- The Rocky Mountain Journals of William Marshall Anderson, with Eleanor T. Harris, (1967) ISBN 978-0-8032-5910-2
