= J. Roderic Korns =

American historian

J Roderic "Rod" Korns (July 24, 1890 – July 2, 1949) was a 20th-century editor, researcher and historian of the American west. He is best known for West from Fort Bridger: The Pioneering of the Immigrant Trails Across Utah 1846–1850, completed with the assistance of historiographer and author Dale L. Morgan. Korns is considered a productive collector of historic sources and an avid historian of western trails.

Korns participated in and was featured in a round of correspondence between historians and researchers associated with the American west. In a 1946 letter to Bernard DeVoto, Korn's friend and collaborator Dale L. Morgan related a story told by Korns.

…A year or so ago I was conducting with Rod Korns a long-distance argument on some question or other relating to Western history, and in the course of the argument we arrived at a point where certain evidences were in dispute. I would not allow them the status of "facts," and Rod with his usual combativeness assured me that that was precisely what they were, facts, brother, facts. So then he told me a story. Once upon a time he had gone duck-hunting with a friend, and in the dawn's early light a duck and a mudhen flew overhead. Both men blasted away with their shotguns, and the two birds fell into the water. "I'll retrieve them," Rod's friend said, and he clambered out of the boat and went sloshing away through the mud and muck, the while Rod glowed in contemplation of this high altruism. So a few minutes later the friend came back to the boat, the duck in one hand and the mudhen in the other, and he tossed the latter into Rod's lap. "Here's your mudhen, Rod," he said graciously.

Now, Rod said, he had been hunting ducks for a good many years, and was a pretty fair shot. Moreover, he'd gotten a clear crack at the duck. So, said he to me now, when you shoot at a fact, you bring down a duck, every time! But when I blast away, it's a mudhen. "Nuts to you," said J. Roderic Korns. Dale Morgan Correspondence, to Bernard DeVoto, January 1946

Korns’ posthumous 1951 volume " West from Fort Bridger: The Pioneering of the Immigrant Trails Across Utah 1846-1850", first appeared as Volume XIX of the "Utah Historical Quarterly". The classic history of the opening of western trails includes primary documents relating immigrant trails including the Hastings Cutoff and the Golden Pass Road into the Salt Lake Valley, with analysis and commentary. Immigrants personal accounts, compiled from original diaries, journals, maps, and letters, recount a half-decade of historic pioneer treks. After Korns' death, Morgan went forward with the author's original plans for organization and publication. Despite his own significant research and editorial contributions, Morgan ascribed primary authorship to his late friend. The work was awarded the American Association for State and Local History's Award of Merit. Salt desert historian Charles Kelly pronounced the volume "one of the most important contributions to Utah history ever assembled" (Bagley, p. viii). Originally produced in a limited edition, the book has been reprinted several times. A 1994 revised version includes excerpts from primary sources which had not yet been discovered or were unavailable to the original researchers.

Korns was the son of William Henry Korns and Roberta Stalcup and attended the University of Utah in Salt Lake City, Utah. He married Sara Beck Marrill, granddaughter of the prominent pioneer miner John Beck of the Bullion-Beck Mine in Juab County, Utah, on January 30, 1917. The couple had two sons.

== Publications ==
- West from Fort Bridger: the pioneering of the Immigrant Trails across Utah, 1846-1850 original diaries and journals edited and with introductions by J. Roderic Korns and Dale L. Morgan; revised and updated by Will Bagley and Harold Schindler. Publisher: Logan, Utah: Utah State University Press, 1994. ISBN 0-87421-178-6.
