= Juanita Brooks =

American historian (1898–1989)

- Born: January 15, 1898; Bunkerville, Nevada, United States
- Died: August 26, 1989 (aged 91); St. George, Utah, United States
- Education: Brigham Young University (BA); Columbia University (MA)
- Occupations: Historian, author
- Spouse(s): Leonard Ernest Pulsipher, Sr. (m. 1919; died 1921) William Brooks (m. 1933; died 1970)
- Writing career
- Notable work: The Mountain Meadows Massacre (1950)

Juanita Pulsipher Brooks (January 15, 1898 – August 26, 1989) was an American historian and author, specializing in the American West and Mormon history. Her most notable contribution was her book related to the Mountain Meadows Massacre, to which her grandfather Dudley Leavitt was sometimes linked, and which caused tension between her and the church authorities. She also made significant archival contributions in the form of collected pioneer diaries documenting early Mormon history in the Dixie, Utah area.

== Biography ==
=== Early life ===
Juanita Leone Leavitt was born to Henry Leavitt and Mary Hafen in Bunkerville, Nevada and raised there. Her grandparents on both sides were polygamists; her paternal grandfather, Dudley Leavitt, being one of the primary founders of Bunkerville. From a young age she developed an interest in history when, "her brilliant, sensitive, and imaginative mind was saturated from childhood in Mormon lore." She was often employed as a grade school teacher in nearby Southern Utah. In 1919 she married Ernest Pulsipher, who died of lymphoma a little more than a year later, leaving her with an infant son, Leonard Ernest Pulsipher. After his death, she resumed her job as a teacher, and then received her bachelor's degree from BYU. Her first published work was a poem titled "Sunrise from the Top of Mount Timp," which appeared in the LDS periodical Improvement Era in 1926.

=== Academia and family life ===
After her bachelors degree, she settled in St. George, Utah, and became an instructor of English and Dean of Women from 1925–1933 at the LDS-backed Dixie Junior College. While on a sabbatical from Dixie College from 1928–1929, she obtained a master's degree from Columbia University.

In 1933, the state of Utah discontinued funding for parochial Mormon post-secondary education. She resigned from the college after the program was cut and, in the same year, married a widower named Will Brooks. She became stepmother to his four sons, Walter, Bob, Grant, and Clair. Within five years the couple added a daughter, Willa Nita, and three sons to their family. Juanita Brooks had affectionate relationships with all of her children, including her step-sons, describing her family as "compound-complex". She would sometimes complain that she lacked time to write because of her family, but she also stated that her loved ones were essential to her happiness. Her children spoke highly of their mother at her funeral, telling stories of her nurturing character.

Her calling as a historian and writer was frequently at odds with her position as a believing Mormon woman. As a woman, she was expected to and, indeed, desired to devote her life to homemaking and motherhood. Her passion for research and writing was very unorthodox for her situation. As she wrote in an article for the Mormon studies journal, Dialogue, in regards to her writing, she "did not talk about it and did not work on it while they were around". She then described how she would always keep a basket of ironing work nearby, so that if a neighbor dropped by, she could cover her typewriter and appear to be doing housework.

=== Tension with the LDS Church ===
Despite her feelings of loyalty to and love for the Church of Jesus Christ of Latter-day Saints, Brooks anticipated excommunication upon the publication of The Mountain Meadows Massacre book. She greatly hoped for some sort of acknowledgement on behalf of general authorities, but she received none. In fact, such notable church authorities as Stephen L. Richards, LeGrand Richards, and Harold B. Lee discouraged Brooks from pursuing her study of the Mountain Meadows Massacre and questioned her motives and research. No disciplinary action was taken against Brooks by the church, but an atmosphere of disgrace descended upon her and her protective husband. For a time, she was ostracized from both her local congregation and Church officials for her investigations on such touchy subjects, and she was no longer published within official LDS Church periodicals. While she would state her opinion openly, she often felt conflicted and guilty in her choice to oppose church leaders. She was confronted with two conflicting forces: the good name of the Church and her own faith on the one hand, and history she believed to be true on the other. In Brooks' letters to general authorities who criticized her, she affirmed her intentions. She famously stated that "This study is not designed either to smear or to clear any individual; its purpose is to present the truth. I feel sure that nothing but the truth can be good enough for the church to which I belong."

Brooks has often been compared to Fawn Brodie, another Mormon historian who wrote No Man Knows My History, a similarly notorious biography of Joseph Smith. In fact, the two became good friends through their mutual connection of Dale Morgan, and frequently corresponded and assisted each other with scholarly work. Although Brodie was excommunicated for her book and Brooks was not, both were labeled as "dissenters".

=== Accomplishments and death ===
Brooks was known as a very humble woman, who, in spite of her numerous recognitions, awards, honors, and academic postings, downplayed her intelligence and achievements. Brooks served on the board of trustees for the Utah State Historical Society for twenty-four years. She received honorary degrees from Utah State University, Southern Utah State College, and the University of Utah. She was also awarded the Distinguished Service Award of the Utah Academy of Arts, Sciences, and Letters in 1958. In 1975, she was awarded an honorary membership in Phi Beta Kappa at the University of Utah and a writing award from Dixie College and the Southern Heritage Writers' Guild. From her home in Salt Lake City, Utah, she kept up close relationships to her children and her ailing mother, Mary, who died in 1980. Around 1976, she began a slow and debilitating mental and physical decline, which stifled her continuing research and hopes of publication. Brooks died in 1989 from Alzheimer's disease, leaving her lifelong autobiographical project unfinished. In honor of Juanita Brooks, a scholarship endowment was established at Utah Tech University, formerly Dixie State College, as well as an annual lecture series.

== Books and scholarly work ==
=== Pioneer diary archiving ===
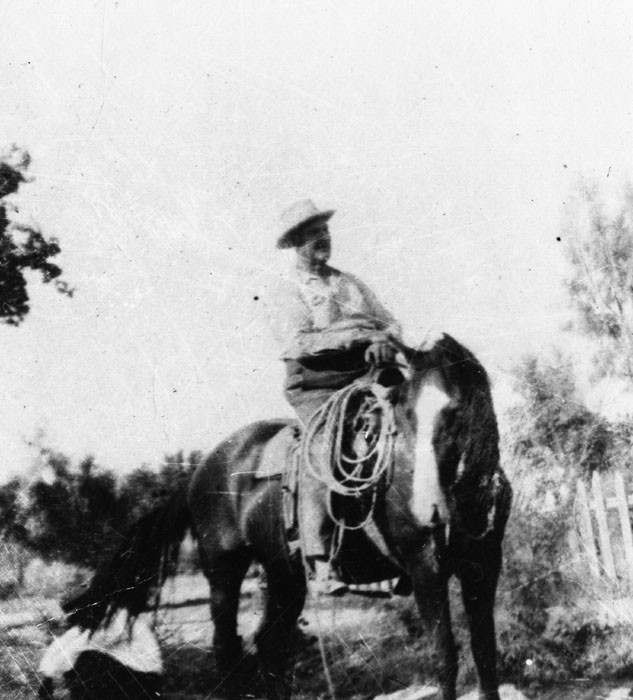
Dudley Leavitt, grandfather of Juanita (Leavitt) Brooks, photographed riding his horse 'Flax'

Brooks' interest in pioneer diaries came from the stories she had been told about the Mountain Meadows Massacre from family members and friends as she was growing up and later began collecting diaries from the area during the time period so that she could gather more information about the events that occurred. Brooks assisted Nels Anderson, while the latter was a graduate student at Columbia doing field work in sociology in Southern Utah, by researching the experiences of Brooks' grandfather Dudley Leavitt. In 1934, while Anderson was on the U.S. National Labor Relations Board, he facilitated Brooks' assignment to start and manage a branch of the Emergency Relief Administration in southern Utah. Brooks fulfilled this objective by paying individuals to transcribe local pioneer's diaries. Brooks continued to devote herself to unearthing diaries and records of early settlers and organizing a Utah library of Mormons; and, in 1947, she joined the Board of the Utah Historical Society. The diary-collecting project was started under the Works Progress Administration during the Depression of the 1930s, and its transcripts were eventually cataloged at the Library of Congress.

This work brought her into contact with Dale Morgan, who was the supervisor for the Utah Writer's Project under the Works Progress Administration. She continued this work for the Huntington Library as a field fellow in the 1940s. These diaries were preserved for others' use due to Juanita's diligent pursuit and copying.

=== Quicksand and Cactus: A Memoir of the Southern Mormon Frontier ===
Per the encouragement of Dale Morgan, Brooks' colleague in the Works Project Administration, Juanita began writing her autobiography, Quicksand and Cactus in which she describes her childhood and early adulthood through a mix of first and third point narrative. She began the manuscript in 1944 and attempted to get published multiple times through 1949 before temporarily abandoning the project to focus on the publication of The Mountain Meadows Massacre. During her revisions of the script, she took advice from Morgan to concentrate on the chapters on her childhood, as the chapters on her later life showed little enthusiasm from editors. Discouraged by rejections from publication firms, she also chose to fictionalize herself in the later versions of the script, substituting for herself a fictional character, Sal, a revision that has been subject to much controversy in the authenticity of her recount. Brooks defended her revision in a letter to D. L. Chambers stating, "While I can see that it may lose something in authenticity, I hope that it may gain in vitality. I had felt that, to justify the book, the subject of an autobiography should have achieved distinction in some field, while a good story may just be a good story."

Brooks revisited the book in 1970 after returning to Salt Lake City after the death of her husband Will Brooks. The next five years were painstaking to finish the book as Brooks found it challenging to stick to it for long periods of time, and her memory began to falter in regards to her first marriage and early widowhood. In 1977, her children moved her back to St. George and boxed the manuscripts, essentially marking the end of her writing career. The rest of the publication was left up to Trudy McMurrin, Brooks' assigned developmental editor at the University of Utah Press. McMurrin pieced together chapters and ideas, but due to a lack of dates and unity in style and themes and despite her best efforts, she deemed the work unfit to publish. Juanita's son Karl Brooks took the matter into his own hands and hired Richard Howe to prepare and publish the work. Howe consulted McMurrin, studied Juanita's correspondence with Morgan, and evaluated consistencies among the paper and typewriters used by Brooks to logically order chapters for its final publication. Thus, the autobiography is unfinished by Juanita herself, a tribute to an unfinished quality of Brooks' living personality.

=== The Mountain Meadows Massacre ===
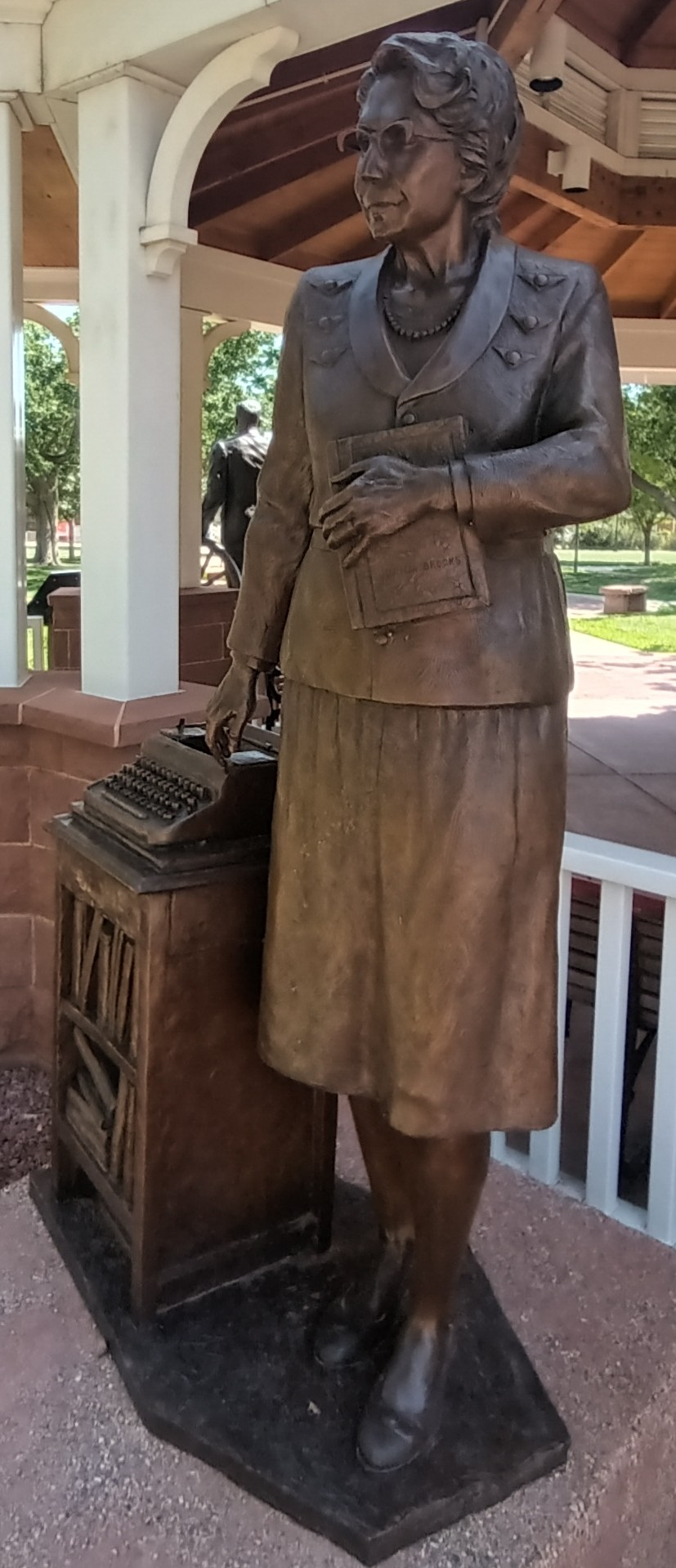
Statue of Brooks in St. George Utah.

Brooks' study of diaries and other personal journals enlivened her historiography, and her subsequent works reflected her scrutiny of such sources. Brooks went on to write numerous historical articles as well as a variety of family narratives including a biography of her pioneer grandfather Dudley Leavitt and a biography of her sheriff husband, Uncle Will Tells His Story. Brooks' notable books on Mormon history include The Mountain Meadows Massacre (1950) and John D. Lee: Zealot, Pioneer Builder, Scapegoat (1961). She also edited Hosea Stout's diaries. Brooks' book on the Mountain Meadows Massacre broke new ground. It was the first comprehensive account of the incident using modern historical methods. Juanita would write after the kids were in bed, often starting at 11:00 pm or midnight, and working for a few hours, then sleep but still get up with the family in the morning to get them all off to school and work. She would write while they were away by keeping her ironing handy; when someone would come over she would cover the typewriter with ironing and then iron until the visitor left. She seemed to have a great deal of ironing, and never seemed to get it finished. This inspired Laurel Thatcher Ulrich, a famous historian and professor: "For a young Mormon mother struggling to define an intellectual life, it was great to know that a renowned historian had once hid her typewriter under the ironing. Juanita Brooks' example taught me that housewives could be thinkers, too."

Brooks' interest in the Mountain Meadows Massacre "gave unity to her life very much like the unity a plot gives a novel." For the topic, she received a grant from the Rockefeller Foundation that helped her to further her research on the Mountain Meadows Massacre and other topics.

While living near the area in Southern Utah where the massacre occurred, Brooks investigated the events thoroughly but found no evidence of direct involvement by Brigham Young. However, she did charge Young with obstructing the investigation and with provoking the attack through his incendiary rhetoric, calling him "an accessory after the fact." Brooks suggested that Young became so fearful of federal invasion that he created a hothouse atmosphere where the militia saw threats everywhere.

Despite her notoriety within the church, The Mountain Meadows Massacre received resounding critical acclaim.

== Publications ==
- A Mormon Chronicle: The Diaries of John D. Lee. Robert Glass Cleland, editor, and Juanita Brooks, editor. Huntington Library Press, reissue June 2004 (Paperback, 868pp), 3 Volumes in 1 book. ISBN 0-87328-178-0. First published in 1955.
- Dudley Leavitt,: Pioneer to Southern Utah. Self-published, St. George, Utah. January 1942.
- Emma Lee. Utah State University Press, Logan, Utah, 7th Printing 1984. ISBN 0-87421-121-2. First published in 1975.
- Frontier tales; true stories of real people. Western Text Society, Special publication – 1972.
- History of the Jews in Utah and Idaho 1853–1950. Salt Lake City, Utah, Western Epics, June 1973. ISBN 9780914740124.
- Jacob Hamblin, Mormon apostle to the Indians. reissue 1980.
- John Doyle Lee: Zealot, Pioneer Builder, Scapegoat. Utah State University Press, Logan, Utah, reissue November 1992 (paperback, 404 pp). ISBN 0-87421-162-X. First published in 1961.
- Lore of faith & folly. Cheney, Thomas Edward, Austin E. Fife, and Juanita Brooks, eds. Bay Country Publishing Corp, 1971.
- The Mountain Meadows Massacre; University of Oklahoma Press (Tdr) reissue May 1991; (softcover, 318 pages). ISBN 0-8061-2318-4. First published in 1950.
- On the ragged edge: The life and times of Dudley Leavitt. Salt Lake City, Utah, Utah State Historical Society, 1973.
- Quicksand and cactus: A memoir of the southern Mormon frontier. Logan, Utah, Utah State University Press, reissue 1982.
- On the Mormon Frontier: The Diary of Hosea Stout, edited by Juanita Brooks. First edition 1964. Published by University of Utah Press. Republished in 1974 by University of Utah Press, Salt Lake City, Utah. (Juanita's daughter-in-law was the great granddaughter of Hosea Stout).
- Uncle Will Tells His Story, published by Taggart & Company, Salt Lake City, Utah. 249 pages. Only 2,500 copies were printed. (Uncle Will is the biography of her husband, written as though he was telling her stories of his life. According to Ken Sanders Rare Books in Salt Lake City, Utah, Juanita Brooks was the first-place winner of the Utah State Institute of Fine Arts Creative Writing Competition for autobiography in 1969).
- The Christmas Tree, published by Peregrine Smith Inc., One small edition, 1972 Hardcover, Jaunita and sister, Charity, manage to wrest a Christmas "tree" from the treeless Nevada desert where they live.
