= Liahona (magazine) =

Religious magazine

- Frequency: Monthly
- Publisher: The Church of Jesus Christ of Latter-day Saints
- First issue: May 1995
- Country: United States
- Language: English and 50 other languages

Liahona (formerly Tambuli in the English-language version) is an official magazine of the Church of Jesus Christ of Latter-day Saints. It is named after the word Liahona from the Book of Mormon. The magazine began publication in 1977.

Prior to 2021, the magazine consisted of articles for children, youth, and adults, all of which were published concurrently in the church's English-language Ensign, New Era, and Friend magazines. Until the April 1995 edition, the English-language version of the magazine was called Tambuli; other language versions of the magazine had different titles. Since 1999, all the languages have adopted some form of the title "Liahona."

== Editors ==
- Dean L. Larsen (1977–78)
- James E. Faust (1979)
- M. Russell Ballard (1980–84)
- Carlos E. Asay (1985–86)
- Hugh W. Pinnock (1987–89)
- Joe J. Christensen (1994–95)
- Jack H. Goaslind (1996–98)
- Marlin K. Jensen (1999–2000)
- Dennis B. Neuenschwander (2001–04)
- Jay E. Jensen (2005–08)
- Spencer J. Condie (2008–10)
- Paul B. Pieper (2010–12)
- Craig A. Cardon (2012–15)
- Joseph W. Sitati (2015–17)
- Hugo E. Martinez (2017–18)
- Randy D. Funk (2018–22)
- Randall K. Bennett (2022-25)
- Robert M. Daines (2025- )

== Change in scope ==
In 2020, the church announced that the English-language Ensign magazine would be discontinued and would be replaced with Liahona. Since Liahona will thus be the church magazine for adults, the content formerly found in Liahona for children and youth will instead be found in The Friend and the new magazine For the Strength of Youth, respectively.

== Previous publications of similar title ==
The Liahona was a weekly newspaper edited by Nephi Anderson published in Independence, Missouri, in 1907. It was collapsed with The Elders' Journal (published in Atlanta, Georgia) into Liahona, the Elders' Journal (based in Independence) which ran from 1907 to 1942. Both focused on the news and doctrine of the church, with relevant reprints.

== See also ==
- List of Latter Day Saint periodicals
