= H. Burke Peterson =

Mormon leader (1923–2013)

Emeritus General Authority
- October 2, 1993 – April 14, 2013
- Called by: Ezra Taft Benson

First Quorum of the Seventy
- April 6, 1985 – October 2, 1993
- Called by: Spencer W. Kimball
- End reason: Granted general authority emeritus status

First Counselor in the Presiding Bishopric
- April 6, 1972 – April 6, 1985
- Called by: Victor L. Brown
- End reason: Honorable release of Victor L. Brown and his counselors

Personal details
- Born: Harold Burke Peterson; September 19, 1923; Salt Lake City, Utah, United States
- Died: April 14, 2013 (aged 89); Bountiful, Utah, United States

Harold Burke Peterson (September 19, 1923 – April 14, 2013) was a general authority of the Church of Jesus Christ of Latter-day Saints (LDS Church) from 1972 until his death. He was a counselor to the presiding bishop and a member of the First Quorum of the Seventy. He became an emeritus general authority in 1993.

Peterson was born in Salt Lake City, Utah and was raised in Phoenix, Arizona, where he became an Eagle Scout. Beginning in 1940, Peterson attended Phoenix College, and in 1942 he joined the United States Navy. He completed a civil engineering course of study at the University of Oklahoma and became a Seabee, working on projects in the Pacific Ocean theater of World War II.

After the war, he earned a bachelor's degree from the University of Arizona and taught at the Utah State Agricultural College (now Utah State University) while he earned his master's degree there. After graduating, he worked in Phoenix with the United States Department of Agriculture. In 1955, he and two other Latter-day Saints founded a civil engineering firm.

In 1947 Peterson married Brookie Cardon in the Mesa Arizona Temple. They eventually had five daughters.

Prior to his call as a general authority, Peterson served in the LDS Church as a bishop and stake president in Phoenix; then later as a regional representative for the Phoenix, Mesa, and Tempe regions. On 6 April 1972, Peterson was appointed as first counselor to Victor L. Brown, the church's presiding bishop. Peterson acted in this capacity until 1985, when Brown was succeeded by Robert D. Hales.

When he was released from the presiding bishopric, Peterson became a member of the church's First Quorum of the Seventy. He served as president of the Jordan River Utah Temple from 1985 to 1987. Peterson continued his responsibilities as a general authority until he was granted emeritus status in October 1993.

Peterson died at his home in Bountiful, Utah, four months after his wife died.

== Publications ==
- H. Burke Peterson, "Setting the Example in the Home", Ensign, July 1972.
- ——, "Harmony in the Home", Ensign, January 1973.
- ——, "Adversity and Prayer", Ensign, January 1974.
- ——, "Return Trip Ticket Home", New Era, April 1974.
- ——, "Mother, Catch the Vision of Your Call", Ensign, May 1974.
- ——, "The Role of the Teacher", New Era, May 1974.
- ——, "Friend to Friend: The Miracle of Prayer", Friend, June 1974.
- ——, "Help for Parents", Ensign, May 1975.
- ——, "The Welfare Production-Distribution Department", Ensign, November 1975.
- ——, "The Church Employment System", Ensign, May 1976.
- ——, "Priesthood—Authority and Power", Ensign, May 1976.
- ——, "Acquiring and Managing Production Projects", Ensign, November 1976.
- ——, "The Greatest Experience", Ensign, February 1977.
- ——, "The Daily Portion of Love", Ensign, May 1977.
- ——, "The Father's Duty to Foster the Welfare of His Family", Ensign, November 1977.
- ——, "Attending to Personal and Family Preparedness", Ensign, November 1978.
- ——, "Your Life Has a Purpose", New Era, May 1979.
- ——, "Purify Our Minds and Spirits", Ensign, November 1980.
- ——, "Our Responsibility to Care for Our Own", Ensign, May 1981.
- ——, "Prayer—Try Again", Ensign, June 1981.
- ——, "The Ministry of the Aaronic Priesthood Holder", Ensign, November 1981.
- ——, "Prepare the Heart of Your Son", Ensign, November 1982.
- ——, "Removing the Poison of an Unforgiving Spirit", Ensign, November 1983.
- ——, "Clean Thoughts, Pure Lives", Ensign, September 1984.
- ——, "Selflessness: A Pattern for Happiness", Ensign, May 1985.
- —— (1986). A Glimpse of Glory (Salt Lake City, Utah: Bookcraft) ISBN 0-88494-590-1.
- ——, "Unrighteous Dominion", Ensign, July 1989.
- ——, "'Touch Not the Evil Gift, nor the Unclean Thing'", Ensign, November 1993.

== Bibliography ==
- Peggy Fletcher Stack, "Longtime LDS leader H. Burke Peterson dies at 89", The Salt Lake Tribune, 2013-04-17.
- Joseph Walker, "Elder H. Burke Peterson, emeritus LDS general authority, dies at 89", Deseret News, 2013-04-17.
- Norman R. Bowen, "Bishop H. Burke Peterson," Ensign, July 1972, p. 16

The Church of Jesus Christ of Latter-day Saints titles
Preceded by Robert L. Simpson	First Counselor in the Presiding Bishopric; April 6, 1972 – April 6, 1985	Succeeded by Henry B. Eyring
