= Parmley =

Parmley may refer to:

- Ian Parmley (born 1989), American baseball player
- LaVern W. Parmley (1900–1980), the fifth general president of the Primary of The Church of Jesus Christ of Latter-day Saints
- Thomas J. Parmley (1897–1997), physics professor at the University of Utah
- William W. Parmley (born 1936), general authority of The Church of Jesus Christ of Latter-day Saints since 2003
