= I Am a Child of God =

Hymn of the Church of Jesus Christ of Latter-day Saints

"I Am a Child of God" is a hymn of the Church of Jesus Christ of Latter-day Saints (LDS Church) for all the members, but more often sung by children. The lyrics were written in 1957 by Naomi W. Randall and set to music by Mildred Tanner Pettit. The song has been translated into over 90 languages. The phrase "I Am a Child of God" is also used in the LDS Church as a declaration of a basic teaching of the church.

== Composition ==
Naomi W. Randall, lyricist

Randall composed the first three verses of "I Am a Child of God" at the request of the general board of the Primary Association, of which she was a member. The board wanted a song that could teach children about LDS Church teachings on the nature of a child's relationship with God. Randall described how she composed the song:

I got down on my knees and prayed aloud, pleading that our Heavenly Father would let me know the right words.

Around 2:00 a.m., I awakened and began to think again about the song. Words came to my mind. … I immediately got up and began to write the words down as they had come to me. Three verses and a chorus were soon formed.

I gratefully surveyed the work, drank of the message of the words, and returned to my bedroom where I knelt before my Father in Heaven to say "Thank you!"

Randall mailed the lyrics to her friend Mildred T. Pettit in California, who wrote the accompanying music.

== Word change ==
The song was first performed at a stake Primary conference in 1957. Several years later, apostle Spencer W. Kimball asked the Primary general board if the phrase "Teach me all that I must know / To live with him someday" could be changed to "Teach me all that I must do / To live with him someday". As Kimball later explained, "To know isn't enough. The devils know and tremble; the devils know everything. We have to do something." Randall accepted the change.

== Publication and additional verse ==
The song was first published in the LDS Church's 1969 Sing with Me, a songbook for children. In 1978, Randall composed a fourth verse to the song. However, when the song was added to the LDS Church's 1985 hymnal, the decision was made to not include the fourth verse because it was considered by the Church Correlation Committee to be "not officially part of the song". When a new church songbook for children was produced in 1989, the fourth verse was included.

"I Am a Child of God" is hymn number 301 in the church's 1985 hymnal and on page 2 in the Children's Songbook.

== Use and popularity ==
"I Am a Child of God" is one of the 45 hymns that the church publishes in its basic curriculum sources that are used in areas of the world where the church is new or underdeveloped. Thus, it is often one of the first hymns that new Latter-day Saints receive and learn. The song has been translated into over 90 languages and has been the subject of numerous musical adaptations by choirs and other musicians. "I Am a Child of God" is a common phrase used in curriculum, magazines, sermons, and children's clothing, jewelry and novelties as a means of teaching a basic LDS doctrine in simple language.

In February 2007, the LDS Church celebrated the 50th anniversary of the writing of "I Am a Child of God".

== Copyright ==
The copyright to "I Am a Child of God" is owned by Intellectual Reserve, Inc., a corporation established by the LDS Church to hold its intellectual property. Intellectual Reserve allows copying or downloading of the music and lyrics of the song for incidental, noncommercial church, or noncommercial home uses. In the United States, the phrase "I Am a Child of God" is not trademarked and may be used by anyone for commercial purposes.

== See also ==
- Choose the right
- "The Family: A Proclamation to the World"
