= Janice Kapp Perry =

American songwriter (born 1938)

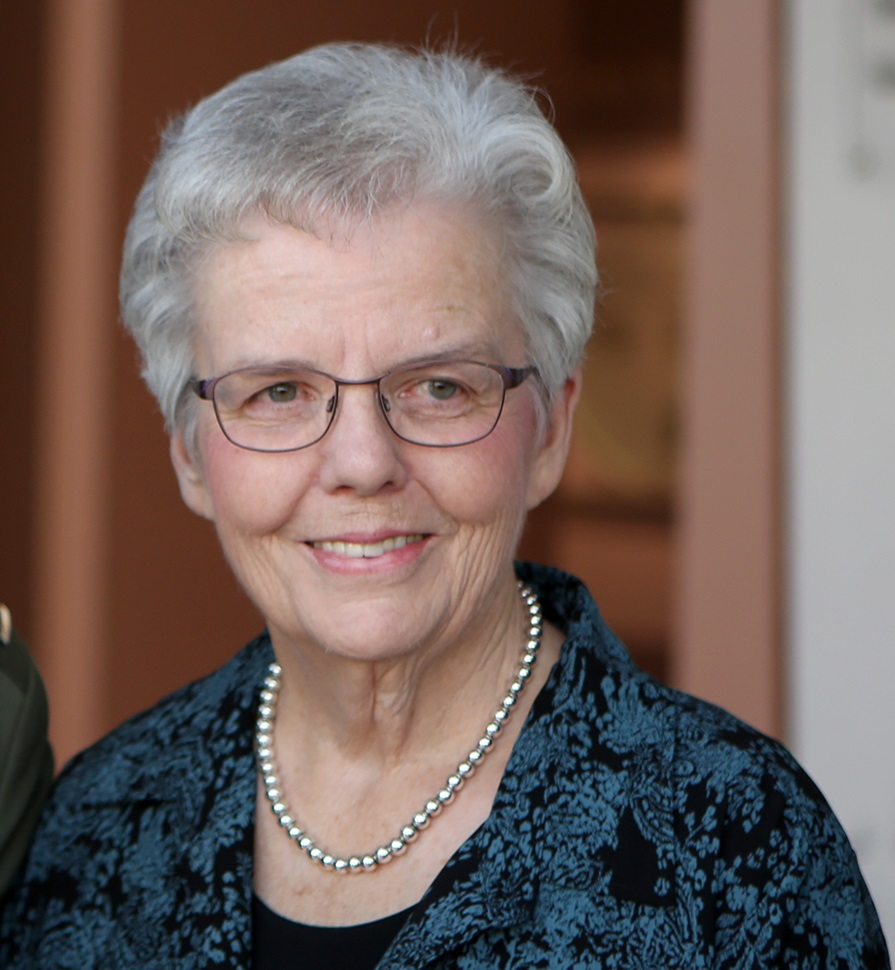
Janice Kapp Perry in 2019

Janice Kapp Perry (born October 1, 1938) is an American composer, songwriter, and author. As a member of the Church of Jesus Christ of Latter-day Saints (LDS Church), she has written over 3,000 songs, some of which appeared in the church's official hymnal, and in the Children's Songbook. Some of her most well-known songs include "I Love to See the Temple" and "A Child's Prayer."

Perry has also composed albums in Spanish, Portuguese, Chinese, Japanese, and Korean.

== Early life ==
Perry was born on October 1, 1938, in Ogden, Utah but spent her childhood on a farm in Vale, Oregon. She grew up in a very musical family. Her mother, Ruth, played the piano and wrote musicals for the children to perform in the community. Her father, Jacob, learned to play the drums to accompany his wife in a family band. After her father died, Perry played the drums in his place. The children in the family also performed in a quartet. In high school, she was in the band, playing snare drum and tympani. She also wrote her very first song, entitled "I Walked in God's Garden." Though music was an important part of her childhood, Perry spent most of her time playing sports. She loved volleyball, basketball and even football. She especially loved softball.

Perry attended Brigham Young University (BYU), where she studied music composition and theory. While there, she played in BYU's concert band, orchestra and sang in the choir.

== Compositions ==
At the age of thirty-eight, Perry broke one of her ankles during one of her basketball games. Her television broke at the same time. With the extra time the incidents afforded her, she was assigned by her ward to compose music for their ward road show. She entered church song writing competitions and wrote new songs for her local church community.

Perry experimented with many styles at the beginning of her career, writing pop music that she sent on demo tapes to Nashville and Los Angeles. Not finding success with pop music, she began writing more contemporary gospel music. Her first church song was written in 1976, entitled "I'll Follow Jesus." She sent the sheet music to local bookstores and partnered with LDS musician Merrill Jenson to produce more music. Perry released her first album Where is Heaven in 1978. Two years later, she created a traveling musical called "It's a Miracle" which was performed in 239 different locations. She and her husband founded Prime Recordings, a music production business.

Perry started her career writing her own melodies and words. Later on, she also wrote music to accompany words written by others. She created melodies to the words of Emily H. Woodmansee, Gordon B. Hinckley, and many others. She has also collaborated with Orrin Hatch to create six albums of songs. In 2001, their song "Heal our Land" was performed at the National Prayer Breakfast and again in 2005 for the presidential inauguration of George W. Bush. In early 2008, Perry set LDS Church president Gordon B. Hinckley's poem, "What is this Thing Called Death," to music after one of her nieces died. It was sung by the Mormon Tabernacle Choir at Hinckley's funeral.

Perry is a prolific composer. She has written nearly 3,000 songs, which she compiled into more than 108 albums. She has also written eight cantatas, two of which have been performed in the Salt Lake Tabernacle, and a number of musicals. She is a member of the Utah Composers Guild, and has traveled all over the world to perform her work, including to Japan and Taiwan.

=== "A Child's Prayer" ===
During Perry's career, a mysterious pain left one of her hands paralyzed. As doctors were not able to find a solution, it became especially difficult to play the piano and compose music. Despite this, she continued to write songs, learning to compose them in her head instead. In a moment of particular despair over her hand, Perry wrote a song entitled "Lord Are You There?" which she later reworked and simplified to become her beloved "A Child's Prayer." There was some controversy with the song, as the church's correlation committee believed the lyrics should include formal prayer language, such as "thee" and "thou," but Perry argued that a child would not use those words when praying. The song ultimately remained the same.

== Performances ==
Her work has been performed by many people and in many places. This includes Brooks & Dunn, the Mormon Tabernacle Choir, and Gladys Knight. Her music has also appeared on television programs like Robert Schuller's program Hour of Power and The Oprah Winfrey Show on their episode following the attacks on 9/11. Pianist Marvin Goldstein also produced albums where he covers Perry's songs.

== Personal life ==
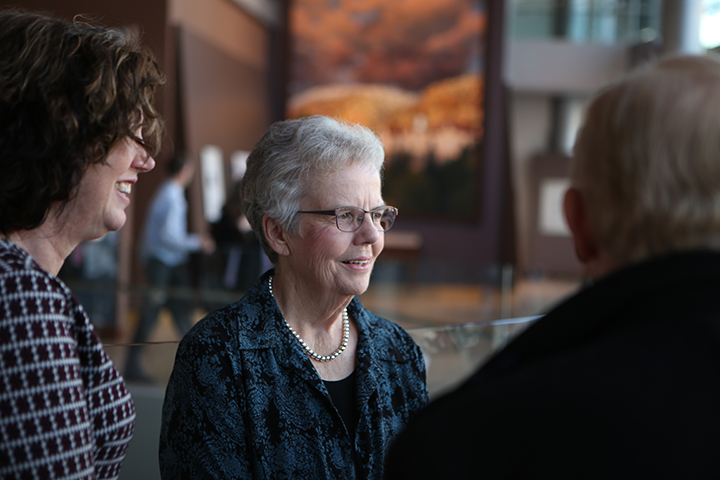
Janice Kapp Perry, center, in 2019

Perry met her husband, Doug, in a music class they both attended at BYU. On September 26, 1958, just before she turned twenty, they were married in the Logan Utah Temple. They had five children together and fostered many other children. Doug died in July 2018.

While raising her family, Perry joined and created community softball leagues, leading them to win many tournaments. She also enjoyed volleyball, racquetball and basketball. She sang in church and local community choirs, and was selected to sing with the Mormon Tabernacle Choir. She sang first alto as a member of the choir from 1993 to 1999. Soon after, she and her husband served as missionaries in Chile. When they left their mission, the couple had organized four choirs composed of local church members and young missionaries also assigned there.

She currently resides in Provo, Utah.

== Awards and documentaries ==
In 1994, Perry was honored with the Exemplary Woman Award from Ricks College (now BYU–Idaho). In 1997, she was awarded the BYU Alumni Distinguished Service Award. In 1998, she was awarded the National George Washington Medal of Honor from the Freedoms Foundation at Valley Forge for the album she wrote with Orrin Hatch. In 1999, Perry won two awards: the Exceptional Merit Award from the LDS Booksellers Association, and the Heritage Award from the Utah/California Women. In 2001, the Faith Centered Music Association honored Perry with their Lifetime Achievement Award.

In LDS Living's list of the 100 greatest LDS songs of all time, Perry's "A Child's Prayer" topped the list at #1. Other songs of hers made the list as well. "We'll Bring the World His Truth" stood at #8, "No Ordinary Man" at #13, "Love is Spoken Here" at #19, "In the Hollow of Thy Hand" at #21, "I Love to See the Temple" at #22, "His Image in Your Countenance" at #24, and "I Walk By Faith" at #27.

In 2000, Perry wrote a book about the stories behind her songs entitled Songs From My Heart. There was also a documentary made about her entitled Janice Kapp Perry: A Life of Service and Song, which premiered in 2009.

In April 2020, BYU awarded her an honorary degree, a doctor of Christian service in music.

== Selected discography ==
- Where is Heaven (1978)
- In the Hollow of Thy Hand (1980)
- We'll Bring the World His Truth (1982)
- The Things of Eternity (1982)
- I'm Trying to Be Like Jesus (1982)
- With All My Heart (1983)
- A Time to Share (1986)
- Su Luz en Mi (1986)
- There Will Be Light (1988)
- The Church of Jesus Christ (1989)
- Scripture Scouts: Musical Adventures in the New Testament (1992)
- Scripture Scouts: Musical Adventures with the Articles of Faith (1992)
- A Song of the Heart (1998)
- 70 Favorite Children's Songs (1998)
- When a Prophet Speaks (2000)
- Janice Kapp Perry's Celtic Variations (2002)
- Los Clásicos de Janice Kapp Perry Vol. 1, 2 (2004)
- Canta Mi Corazón (2004)
- A Woman's Heart (2009)
- Let's Sing About Latter-Day Prophets (2009)
- Por Meios Pequenos e Simples (2009)
- When Love Leads the Way: 11 Songs in Japanese (2009)
- Sua Luz Em Mim (2009)
- Let Me Be A Light: 11 Songs in Japanese (2009)
- In the Arms of His Love (2009)
- A Gift of Love (2009)
- Soft Sounds for a Soothing Sunday, Vol. 1,2,3,& 4 (2010)
- He Brought Me Light (2010)
- The Book of Mormon Has Come Forth (2011)
- Soft Sounds for a Soothing Sunday, Vol. V, VI (2011)
- Beloved Double Melodies of Janice Kapp Perry (2011)
- As A Child of God (2012)
- Soft Sounds for a Soothing Sunday, Vol. VII, VIII (2012)
- Soft Sounds for a Soothing Sunday, Vol. IX, X (2013)
- Merry Christmas to You (2013)
- Christmas Magic All Around (2013)
- My Faith in Jesus Leads Me On (2013)
- Soft Sounds for a Soothing Sunday, Vol XII, XIII (2014)
- Book of Mormon Heroes (2017)
