= Adele C. Howells =

American Mormon leader (1886–1951)

4th General President of the Primary
- 1943 – April 14, 1951
- Called by: Heber J. Grant
- Predecessor: May Green Hinckley
- Successor: LaVern W. Parmley
- Reason: Death of Hinckley

First Counselor in the general presidency of the Primary
- 1940 – 1943
- Called by: May Green Hinckley
- Predecessor: Isabelle S. Ross
- Successor: LaVern W. Parmley

Personal details
- Born: Adele Morris Cannon; January 11, 1886; Salt Lake City, Utah Territory, U.S.
- Died: April 14, 1951 (aged 65); Salt Lake City, Utah, U.S.
- Resting place: Forest Lawn Memorial Park; 34.125°N 118.252°W
- Notable works: Editor of The Children's Friend
- Spouse(s): David P. Howells
- Parents: George M. Cannon; Adelaide Morris

Adele Morris Cannon Howells (January 11, 1886 – April 14, 1951) was the fourth Primary general president of the Church of Jesus Christ of Latter-day Saints (LDS Church) from 1943 until her death of rheumatic heart disease. She contributed to The Children's Friend magazine, as well as the fundraising for the Children's Primary Hospital in Salt Lake City, Utah.

== Early life ==
Adele Morris Cannon was born in Salt Lake City, Utah Territory, to George Mousley Cannon and Marian Adelaide Morris. She was the oldest of nine children, and her father was the first president of the Utah State Senate. As a child, Cannon suffered from rheumatic fever. She enjoyed reading in her spare time and horseback riding. Cannon attended schools in Salt Lake City and graduated from the LDS High School and Business College in 1903. She attended the University of Utah and studied physical education and graduated with a bachelor's degree in 1909.

Cannon was married to David P. Howells on March 13, 1913. After their marriage, the couple left for San Francisco, California, where David attended law school. The couple never conceived any biological children, but adopted three: Paul, Frances, and Barbara.

== Career ==
After graduation, Howells began teaching English and physical education in Oakley, Idaho. She stayed for a year, and then returned to Salt Lake City to teach physical education at LDS Business College. She also taught at the Deseret Gym and was employed at the Salt Lake City recreation department.

In 1913, an article on playground movement that Howells wrote was published in the Young Woman's Journal. For some time, Howells served as the secretary to her husband. He had formed a company that purchased and distributed American silent movies throughout Europe and countries around the world. The couple traveled extensively, although they had residency in New York City. She and her husband lived for two years in Australia, and also lived in Paris, France and London. Howells purchased many items from around the world including candelabras and rugs that decorated her home throughout the years. She was a foreign correspondent for the New York Morning Telegram while her family was abroad. During this time, Howells also wrote articles for the Deseret News; her column was titled "News from New York." David sold the film company in 1921, and the couple moved to Los Angeles.

Howells's husband was called as bishop of their LDS Church ward in 1925. In 1936, Howells wrote articles for the Improvement Era which reflected her experience as the wife of a bishop. She was also involved in the church and was the president of Relief Society at the stake level. The couple also contributed significantly to the construction of the Los Angeles Temple, and they bought property next to the temple site so that they could live close by, although they never lived to see its completion in 1956. They were good friends of Heber J. Grant and his wife.

== Church contributions ==
David suddenly died in 1939. After his death, Howells became first counselor to Primary General President May Green Hinckley in 1940 and moved back to Utah to fulfill this responsibility. Her first assignment as a counselor was to work as editor on The Children's Friend, a magazine for children. It became an instrument to teach children about church principles, while also display the artistic talents and developments of the Primary. Howells was responsible for adding new columns to the magazine, including "Be Kind to Animals." She made the magazine more readable for children, including coloring pages and cut outs, as well as printing the pages on heavier paper to make it more durable.

When Hinckley unexpectedly died in 1943, Howells was chosen by Grant, who was the church's president, as Hinckley's successor. Howells served for nine years, until her death from rheumatic fever in Salt Lake City in 1951. She was succeeded by LaVern W. Parmley, who had served as her first counselor.

The official seal of the Primary, created by Howells and adopted in 1940.

While serving as president, Howells attended a number of child education conferences. She helped restructure the Primary's curriculum and helped create the Children's Friend of the Air, a radio program broadcast for children. The radio segment was only 15 minutes and began in June 1946. Children submitted poetry to be read on the air, and were asked to talk on the air about their hobbies and interests. In 1948, Howells contributed to a television program called Junior Council. The show was broadcast weekly, and involved children answering questions from a studio audience. However, it later shifted its focus to highlight DIY projects for children. Howells also helped the Primary children collect and donate money for the This is the Place Monument in the park its housed in.

During her tenure as Primary president and editor of The Children's Friend, Howells commissioned a series of paintings by Arnold Friberg depicting scenes from the Book of Mormon in 1950. Since there was not enough in the magazine's budget to cover the cost of an artist and the church did not supply the funding, Howells funded the project herself by selling her own land. The first painting appeared in The Children's Friend in January 1953. Twelve more paintings were featured in the magazine during the next 8 years. In 1953, these paintings received the best magazine insert award from the National Offset-Lithography Competition. These Book of Mormon paintings have been used throughout church curriculum.

Howells was devoted to helping children develop artistic skills while learning about spiritual topics. In 1951, she was involved with the publishing of a The Children Sing, a songbook for Primary children. As Primary president, Howells served as the president of the board of trustees of the Primary Children's Hospital. She helped raise money for the construction of a new hospital through her "buy a brick" campaign. Contributors could donate a dime that would go to the purchase a brick of the hospital. They raised over $20,000. This amount of money bought 203,303 bricks and mortar for the new building. In 1949, ground was broken for the hospital. It was finished 9 months after Howells's death.

== Other contributions ==
Howells established scholarship funds at Brigham Young University and the University of Utah teacher training schools. She was known for giving to needy families. Howells became a member of the Salt Lake City Hall of Fame in 1948.

The Church of Jesus Christ of Latter-day Saints titles
Preceded by May Green Hinckley	President of the Primary; 1943–1951	Succeeded by LaVern W. Parmley
Preceded by Isabelle S. Ross	First Counselor in the general presidency of the Primary; 1940–1943	Succeeded by LaVern W. Parmley
