= Asunción Paraguay Temple =

Temple of the LDS church

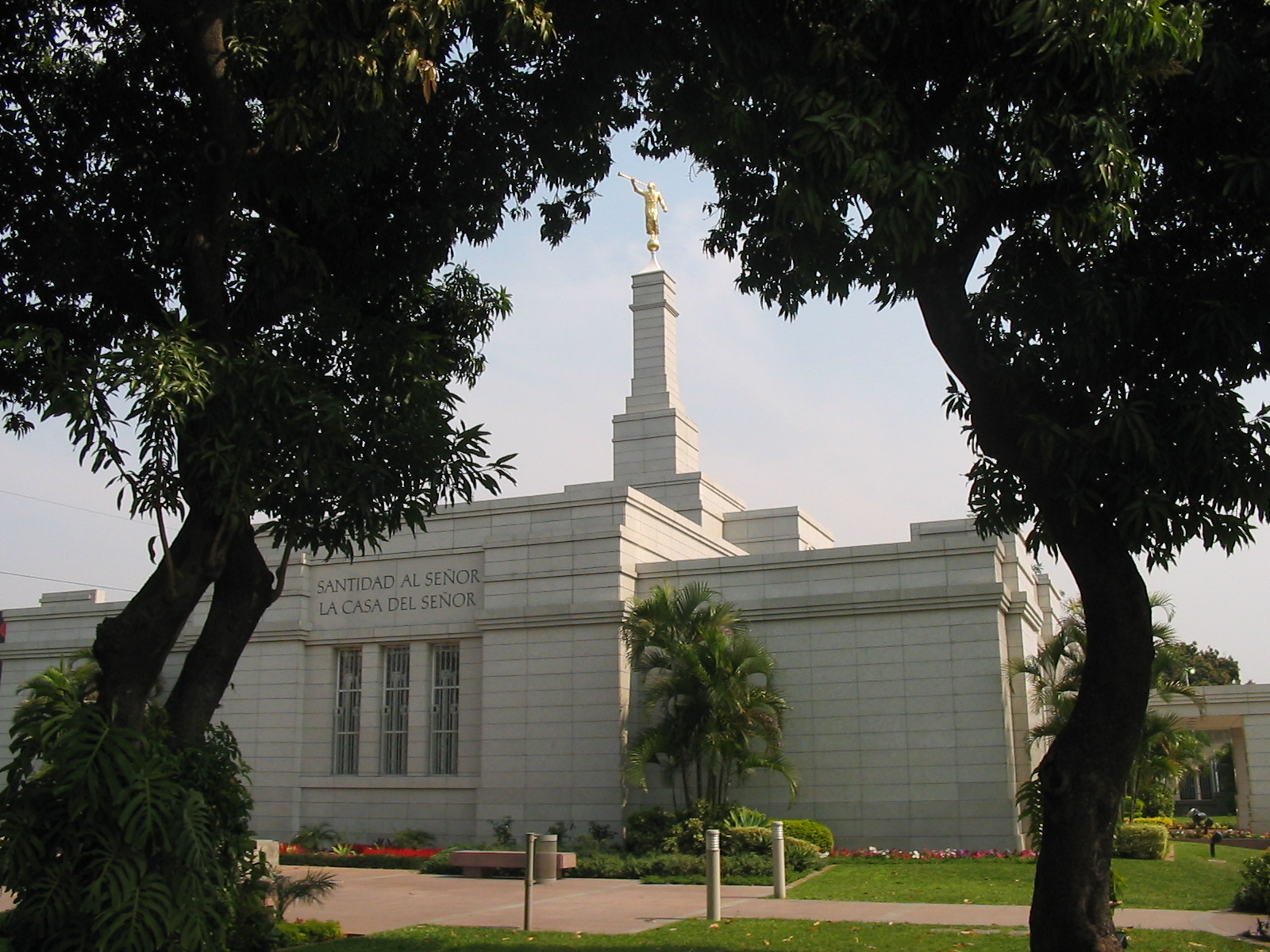
- Interactive map of Asunción Paraguay Temple
- Number: 112
- Dedication: 19 May 2002, by Gordon B. Hinckley
- Site: 1.13 acres (0.46 ha)
- Floor area: 11,906 ft^{2} (1,106.1 m^{2})
- Height: 71 ft (22 m)
- Official website • News & images

Church chronology
← Campinas Brazil Temple	Asunción Paraguay Temple	→ Nauvoo Illinois Temple

Additional information
- Announced: 2 April 2000, by Gordon B. Hinckley
- Groundbreaking: 3 February 2001, by Jay E. Jensen
- Open house: 4–11 May 2002; 12–19 October 2019
- Rededicated: 3 November 2019, by D. Todd Christofferson
- Current president: Alcides Yolanda Colmán
- Designed by: Eduardo Signorelli
- Location: Asunción, Paraguay
- Coordinates: 25°17′16.49759″S 57°36′10.32839″W
- Exterior finish: Light gray Asa Branca Brazilian granite
- Design: Classic modern, single-spire design
- Baptistries: 1
- Ordinance rooms: 2 (two-stage progressive)
- Sealing rooms: 2

The Asunción Paraguay Temple is a temple of the Church of Jesus Christ of Latter-day Saints, located in Asunción, Paraguay. It was the first temple built in Paraguay and was constructed on the site of the first Latter-day Saint chapel in the country, which was completed in 1964. The temple was announced by church president Gordon B. Hinckley during the April 2000 general conference. It was dedicated on May 19, 2002. With its dedication, every Spanish-speaking country in South America had an operating temple.

The temple closed for renovations in October 2017 and was rededicated by D. Todd Christofferson of the Quorum of the Twelve Apostles on November 3, 2019. The temple is on a 7-acre plot and has exterior walls of white-gray Asa Branca Brazilian granite, along with a single spire that has a statue of the angel Moroni on its top. The interior includes representation of the Lapacho tree flower, Paraguay's national tree and flower.

== History ==
=== Announcement and construction ===
The intent to construct the temple was announced by church president Gordon B. Hinckley, along with five others, during the April 2000 general conference. A groundbreaking ceremony took place on February 3, 2001, and was presided over by Jay E. Jensen, a member of the Seventy and president of the church's South America South Area.

The temple was built on the site of the first Latter-day Saint chapel constructed in Paraguay, which was completed in 1964. When construction of the temple was completed, a public open house was held from May 4–11, 2002, with approximately 22,480 visitors touring the temple, including the first lady of Paraguay.

=== Dedication ===
Hinckley dedicated the temple on May 19, 2002, with four sessions held. He was accompanied by James E. Faust, second counselor in the First Presidency. With its dedication, every Spanish-speaking country in South America had an operating temple.

=== Renovation and rededication ===
In April 2017, the First Presidency announced that the temple would close in October of that year for renovations. Following the renovations, another public open house was held from October 12–19, 2019, with approximately 20,000 visitors attending. D. Todd Christofferson of the Quorum of the Twelve Apostles rededicated the temple on November 3, 2019. This was the first temple rededication done by Christofferson, who previously served as a young missionary in part of the temple’s district. At the time of rededication, there were nearly 95,000 church members in Paraguay.

In 2020, like all the church's others, the Asunción Paraguay Temple was closed for a time in response to the COVID-19 pandemic.

== Design and architecture ==
The temple is on a 7-acre (including the meetinghouse) plot. The exterior has white gray Asa Branca Brazilian granite. The building has a single spire with a statue of the angel Moroni on its top. The temple has two ordinance rooms, two sealing rooms, and a baptistry.

The temple was constructed on the same site as the first chapel the church built in the country. That original meetinghouse was razed to make room for the temple. The interior of the temple was designed using a Lapacho tree flower motif, the Paraguay National Tree and Flower, and is seen throughout the design, including lighting, coloring and paint, art glass, and stone.

== Temple leadership and admittance ==
The church's temples are directed by a temple president and matron, each typically serving for a term of three years. The president and matron oversee the administration of temple operations and provide guidance and training for both temple patrons and staff. John J. Whetten was the first president, with Louise J. Whetten serving as matron.. As of 2025, Alcides E. Martinez is the president, with Yolanda E. Colmán serving as matron.

=== Admittance ===
On July 15, 2021, the church announced the public open house that was held from October 12 through October 19, 2019, excluding Sundays. Like all the church's temples, it is not used for Sunday worship services. To members of the church, temples are regarded as sacred houses of the Lord. Once dedicated, only church members with a current temple recommend can enter for worship.

== See also ==

Temples in and near Argentina
= Operating
= Under construction
= Announced
= Temporarily Closed

- Comparison of temples of The Church of Jesus Christ of Latter-day Saints
- List of temples of The Church of Jesus Christ of Latter-day Saints
- List of temples of The Church of Jesus Christ of Latter-day Saints by geographic region
- Temple architecture (Latter-day Saints)
- The Church of Jesus Christ of Latter-day Saints in Paraguay
