= Doyle L. Green =

American magazine editor (1915–1975)

Doyle LeRoy Green (1915 – November 23, 1975) was editor of the Improvement Era and later of the Ensign, New Era, and Friend magazines for the Church of Jesus Christ of Latter-day Saints (LDS Church).

== Biography ==
From 1936 to 1939, Green served as a missionary for the LDS Church in Tahiti.

Green joined the staff of the Improvement Era in 1947 as assistant managing editor. He worked with apostles Spencer W. Kimball and Howard W. Hunter in formulating the new church magazine plan in 1970. Green also wrote several books. His most notable work was Meet the Mormons, which he authored with Randall L. Green.

Green has been credited with popularizing the paintings of Carl Heinrich Bloch in the Latter-day Saint imagination, as in, for instance, his usage of Bloch's art in a book about the life of Jesus published by Deseret Books entitled He That Liveth (1958). Green said that:

"[Bloch's] fascination with detail, his powerful use of light and shadow, his dramatic animation and heroic vision, his accurate draftsmanship and the all but perfect structural qualities of his figures, combined with the skillful use of vivid color, give a highly realistic quality to his paintings. His buildings, trees and shrubs, clothing, general terrain, and even walls and rocks create a remarkably accurate impression of the Holy Land area Carl Heinrich Bloch tell a story of the Savior that can be understood by all. It is hoped that they will bring much inspiration, joy, and homes and classrooms throughout the Church."

The paintings' "utility for Church publications" eventually led to a visit by church representatives in 1990 to officials of the Frederiksborg Museum, where these paintings are housed, in order to request permission to make re-photographed copies (which was granted).

Up until 1972, Green was director of all publications for the LDS Church. He served on the General Board of the Young Men's Mutual Improvement Association. From 1972 until his death, he also served in the church as a patriarch.

After many old church publications, including Improvement Era, ceased publication in 1970, Green took part as an editor in the church's new magazine entitled Ensign. While the transition away from these long-standing periodicals was sad for many, Green made optimistic public remarks about the Ensign, saying that it would become "the best religious magazine for adults published anywhere in the world." Green holds the distinction of having been the only non-general authority editor of the Ensign, New Era, and Friend magazines.

After Green died in 1975, he was succeeded in the role of overseeing the magazines by Dean L. Larsen.

== Sources ==
- Jay M. Todd, "Director of Church Magazines Dies", Ensign, January 1976
- Jay M. Todd, "A Status Report on Church Magazines", Ensign, February 1976
- Jay M. Todd, "Improvement Era", Encyclopedia of Mormonism (1992)
