= The Instructor (LDS Church) =

- January 1969 edition
- Frequency: Monthly
- Publisher: Deseret Sunday School Union
- First issue: 1930
- Final issue: December 1970
- Country: United States
- Based in: Salt Lake City, Utah
- Language: English

The Instructor was an official periodical of the Church of Jesus Christ of Latter-day Saints (LDS Church) between 1930 and 1970, during which time it was the official organ of the LDS Church's Sunday School organization.

== History ==
The Instructor began publication in 1930, when the church's Sunday School ceased publication of The Juvenile Instructor, its official publication since 1901. Like its predecessor, The Instructor was targeted primarily at the LDS Church's youth and young adult membership. The first editor of the periodical was George D. Pyper, a member of the general superintendency of the Deseret Sunday School Union.

With the implementation of the Priesthood Correlation Program, The Instructor ceased publication in 1970. Although the Sunday School did not replace it with an official publication, in 1971 the LDS Church began publishing the New Era for youth and the Ensign for adults.

== See also ==
- List of Latter Day Saint periodicals
