= Steven E. Snow =

American religious leader

Emeritus General Authority
- October 5, 2019

First Quorum of the Seventy
- March 31, 2001 – October 5, 2019
- Called by: Gordon B. Hinckley
- End reason: Granted general authority emeritus status

Presidency of the Seventy
- August 1, 2007 – January 20, 2012
- Called by: Gordon B. Hinckley
- End reason: Released to become Church Historian and Recorder

Personal details
- Born: Steven Erastus Snow; November 23, 1949 (age 75); St. George, Utah, United States
- Spouse(s): Phyllis Squire (m. 1971; died 2024)
- Children: 4

Steven Erastus Snow (born November 23, 1949) has been a general authority of the Church of Jesus Christ of Latter-day Saints (LDS Church) since 2001. He served as the Church Historian and Recorder from 2012 until 2019.

Snow was born in St. George, Utah into a Latter-day Saint family. Snow has an accounting degree from the Jon M. Huntsman School of Business at Utah State University and a Juris Doctor from Brigham Young University. He has been a deputy county attorney for Washington County, Utah, president and a senior partner in the Snow Nuffer law firm. He served as president of his local school board, chairman of the Utah State Board of Regents, and chairman of the Western States Commission of Higher Education.

On July 26, 2012, he was appointed by U.S. President Barack Obama as a member of the President's Council for Faith-Based and Neighborhood Partnerships. Membership on the council is generally a one-year appointment, though members may serve longer and are eligible for reappointment, as they serve at the pleasure of the President.

== LDS Church service ==
As a young man, he served as a missionary for the LDS Church in West Germany. Prior to his call as a general authority, Snow was a bishop, stake president, and president of the church's California San Fernando Mission. In 1999, he became an area seventy in the church's Utah South Area.

Snow became a general authority and a member of the First Quorum of the Seventy in April 2001. He began service as a member of the seven-man Presidency of the Seventy on August 1, 2007. In that capacity, Snow was responsible for overseeing the work of the church in the North America Central Area and later the three areas in Utah.

=== Church Historian and Recorder ===
In January 2012, Snow was announced to replace Marlin K. Jensen, as Church Historian and Recorder. To effect a smooth transition, Snow was released from the Presidency of the Seventy on January 20, 2012, in order to begin working immediately with Jensen. Snow replaced Jensen in August 2012 and Jensen was designated an emeritus general authority in October 2012. Snow continued to serve as Church Historian and Recorder until August 2019, at which point, he was replaced in that assignment by LeGrand R. Curtis Jr.

Snow was instrumental in updating the Priesthood Restoration Site that was dedicated by Russell M. Nelson on September 19, 2015. He was also credited with the introduction of the planned four-volume narrative history of the LDS Church called, Saints.

In 2017, Snow confirmed the $35 million purchase of the printer’s manuscript of the Book of Mormon from the Community of Christ. Snow explained the importance, "The printer’s manuscript is the earliest surviving copy of about 72 percent of the Book of Mormon text, as only about 28 percent of the earlier dictation copy survived decades of storage in a cornerstone in Nauvoo."

He was designated as an emeritus general authority in October 2019.

== Personal life ==
Snow married Phyllis Squire in June 1971. They are the parents of four sons. Snow's great-great-great grandfather is 19th century church apostle Erastus Snow.

== See also ==
- "Three Called to Serve in Presidency of the Seventy," Ensign, August 2007, pp. 76–77.
- "Elder Steven E. Snow of the Seventy," Ensign, May 2001, p. 105
