= David Boone (disambiguation) =

David Boone (1951–2005) was an American-born former Canadian Football League player.

David Boone or Boon may also refer to:

- David F. Boone, American professor and Mormon historian
- David Sheldon Boone (born 1952), American-born Soviet spy
- David Boon (born 1960), Australian cricketer
