= Naomi W. Randall =

Latter-day Saint songwriter and author (1908–2001)

First Counselor in the general presidency of the Primary
- 1970 – 1974
- Called by: LaVern W. Parmley
- Predecessor: Lucile C. Reading
- Successor: Sara B. Paulsen

Personal details
- Born: Naomi Harriet Ward; October 5, 1908; North Ogden, Utah, United States
- Died: May 17, 2001 (aged 92); La Mesa, California, United States
- Cause of death: "advanced age"
- Resting place: Ben Lomond Cemetery; 41.313°N 111.965°W
- Known For: Wrote lyrics to "I Am a Child of God"
- Spouse(s): Earl A. Randall
- Parents: Lorenzo and Mary Ward

Naomi Harriet Ward Randall (October 5, 1908 – May 17, 2001) was a Latter-day Saint songwriter and author and a leader in the Primary of the Church of Jesus Christ of Latter-day Saints (LDS Church). In 1957, Randall wrote the lyrics to "I Am a Child of God", an LDS Church hymn that was originally written as a song for children.

Randall served as a member of the general board of the Primary Association for 27 years. As a member of the board, she was asked to write a song for children that would teach them the LDS Church beliefs on the nature of a child's relationship with God. The result was "I Am a Child of God", which has been published in over 90 languages. Randall also wrote the lyrics to "When Faith Endures", which is hymn #128 in the LDS Church hymnal.

Randall was a frequent contributor to The Children's Friend and was the chair of the Primary committee that created the CTR ring. From 1970 and 1974, Randall was the first counselor to LaVern W. Parmley in the general presidency of the Primary.

On October 13, 1998, Randall was awarded a Presidential Citation by Brigham Young University president Merrill J. Bateman for her lifelong service to the children of the LDS Church.

Naomi Harriet Ward was born in North Ogden, Utah. She was married to Earl A. Randall and was the mother of one child. Naomi Randall died due to advanced age in La Mesa, California.

== Notes ==
The Church of Jesus Christ of Latter-day Saints titles
Preceded by Lucile C. Reading	First Counselor in the general presidency of the Primary; 1970 — 1974	Succeeded by Sara B. Paulsen
