= The Church of Jesus Christ of Latter-day Saints in Paraguay =

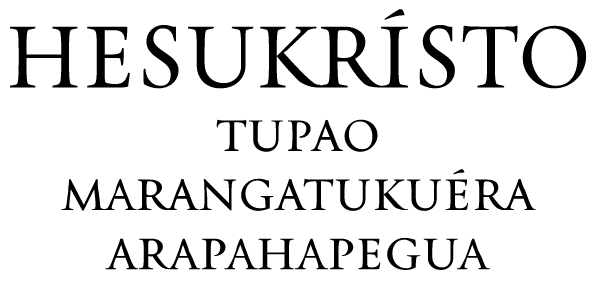
- (Logo in Guarani)

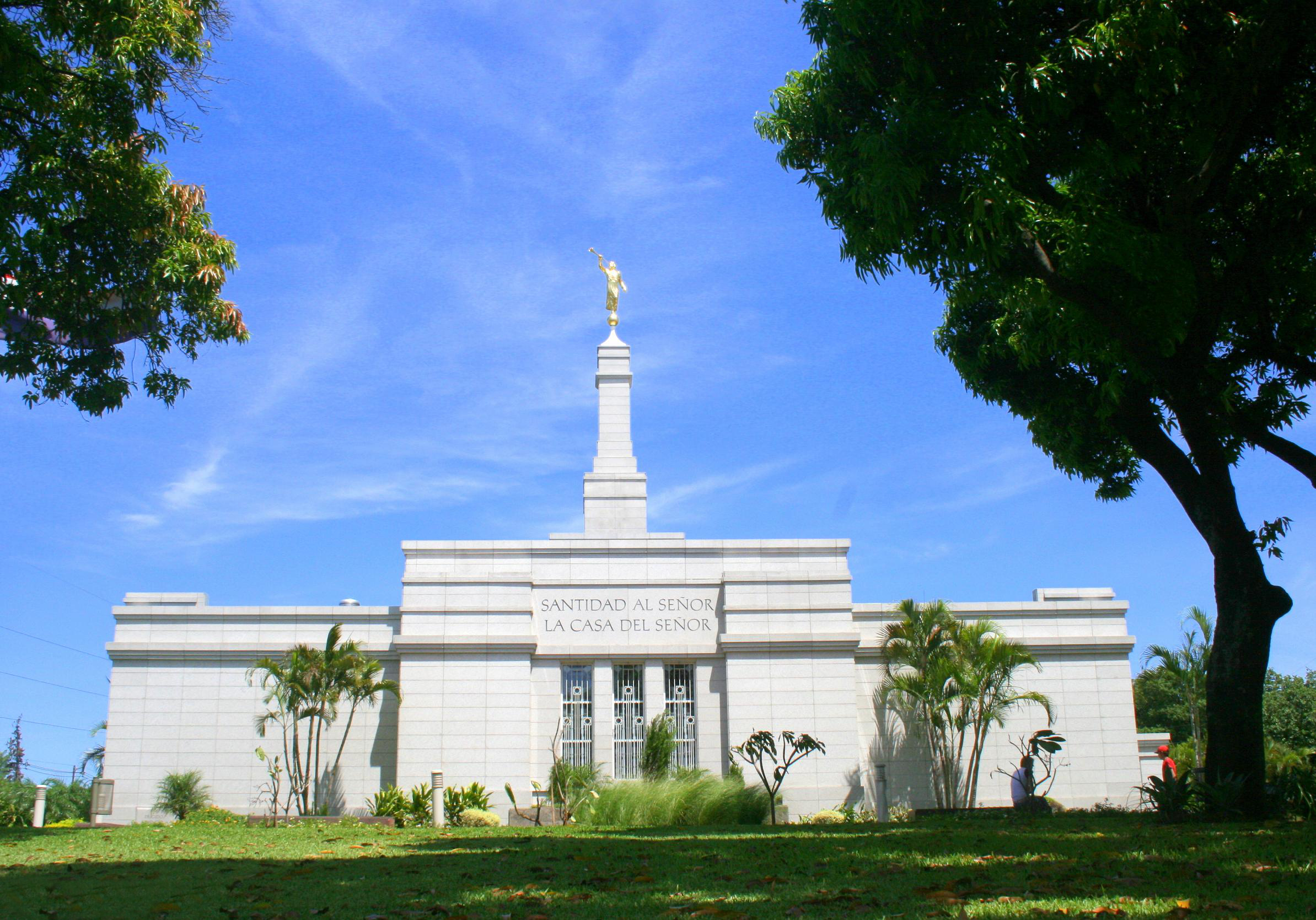
- The Asunción Paraguay Temple
- Area: South America South
- Members: 106,345 (2025)
- Stakes: 11
- Districts: 9
- Wards: 63
- Branches: 72
- Total congregations: 135
- Missions: 3
- Temples: 1 operating
- FamilySearch Centers: 31

The Church of Jesus Christ of Latter-day Saints in Paraguay refers to the Church of Jesus Christ of Latter-day Saints (LDS Church) and its members in Paraguay. The first branch was established in 1948. Since then, the LDS Church in Paraguay has grown to more than 100,000 members in 135 congregations.

== History ==
Membership in Paraguay
Year	Membership
1950	5
1960	132
1970	670
1979	2,984
1989*	11,000
1999	44,632
2009	74,802
2019	96,114
2025	106,345
*Membership was published as an estimate. Source: Wendall J. Ashton; Jim M. Wall, Deseret News, various years, Church Almanac Country Information: Paraguay

=== Pre-Paraguayan Missions ===
The LDS Church was organized in 1830 and is a missionary church. Its first missionary took place a month after their initial organization. The first example of a foreign LDS Church in 1837 was in Great Britain, missions were sent across the world by 1854. The Pacific Isles in 1844, France in 1849, Asia and Australia in 1851, and South Africa in 1853.

Though the Mormon faith was always intended to be spread to the whole world, it was not preached in South America until 1925, though there had been an earlier, unsuccessful mission in 1851. Due to language barriers and insufficient funds the 1851 missionaries returned home. Between 1851 and 1925 no other attempts to preach were made.

=== Paraguayan Missions ===
The first LDS Church member to visit Paraguay was Frederick S. Williams, in 1939 who was working as a missionary in Argentina. The first member was baptized in August 1948 and the first official congregation was organised that same year. The LDS Church has grown significantly since then; when the church first appeared in Paraguay there were 5 members, this number has since grown to over 100,000 or roughly 1.4% of the population.

In 2020, the LDS Church temporarily canceled services and other public gatherings in response to the spread of the coronavirus pandemic which resumed online and/or in person, depending on the congregation.

== Stakes and Districts ==
As of July 2026, Paraguay had the following stakes:

Stake	Organized	Mission
Asunción Paraguay Stake	25 Feb 1979	Paraguay Asunción South
Asuncion Paraguay North Stake	22 Nov 1992	Paraguay Asunción North
Boquerón Paraguay District	2 Oct 1981	Paraguay Asunción North
Caacupé Paraguay District	2 Oct 1981	Paraguay Asunción East
Caaguazú Paraguay District	9 May 1995	Paraguay Asunción East
Capiatá Paraguay Stake	31 Oct 2004	Paraguay Asunción East
Ciudad del Este Paraguay Stake	2 Jun 1996	Paraguay Asunción East
Concepción Paraguay District	2 Oct 1981	Paraguay Asunción North
Encarnacion Paraguay District	2 Oct 1981	Paraguay Asunción South
Fernando de la Mora Paraguay Stake	1 Jun 1980	Paraguay Asunción South
Fernando de la Mora Paraguay South Stake	15 Jun 1997	Paraguay Asunción South
La Paloma Paraguay District	4 Apr 1994	Paraguay Asunción East
Limpio Paraguay Stake	27 Feb 2005	Paraguay Asunción North
Luque Paraguay Stake	11 Feb 2001	Paraguay Asunción North
Luque Paraguay South Stake	22 Oct 2006	Paraguay Asunción North
Ñemby Paraguay Stake	24 Jul 2005	Paraguay Asunción South
Paraguarí Paraguay District	20 Nov 1994	Paraguay Asunción South
Pedro Juan Caballero Paraguay District	3 Mar 1994	Paraguay Asunción North
Pilar Paraguay District	6 Jun 1997	Paraguay Asunción South
San Lorenzo Paraguay Stake	20 Nov 1994	Paraguay Asunción East

== Missions ==
Mission	Organized
Paraguay Asunción	1 Jul 1977
Paraguay Asunción North	1 Jul 1998
Paraguay Asunción South	1 Jul 2026

== Temples ==
=== Asunción Paraguay Temple ===
112. Asunción Paraguay Temple; Official website; News & images	
Location: Announced: Groundbreaking: Dedicated: Rededicated: Size: Style:	Asunción, Paraguay; 2 April 2000 by Gordon B. Hinckley; 3 February 2001 by Jay E. Jensen; 19 May 2002 by Gordon B. Hinckley; 3 November 2019 by D. Todd Christofferson; 11,906 sq ft (1,106.1 m^{2}) on a 1.13-acre (0.46 ha) site Classic modern, single-spire design - designed by Eduardo Signorelli

== See also ==
- Religion in Paraguay
