= Marlin K. Jensen =

American attorney (born 1942)

First Quorum of the Seventy
- April 1, 1989 – October 6, 2012
- End reason: Designated an emeritus general authority

Presidency of the Seventy
- August 15, 1998 – August 15, 2001
- End reason: Honorably released

Emeritus General Authority
- October 6, 2012

Personal details
- Born: Marlin Keith Jensen; May 18, 1942 (age 84); Huntsville, Utah, U.S.
- Education: Brigham Young University (BS); University of Utah (JD)
- Spouse(s): Kathleen Bushnell
- Children: 8

Marlin Keith Jensen (born May 18, 1942) is an American attorney who has been a general authority of the Church of Jesus Christ of Latter-day Saints (LDS Church) since 1989. He served as the official Church Historian and Recorder of the church from 2005 to 2012. He was the 19th man to hold that calling since it was established in 1830. Jensen was made an emeritus general authority in the October 2012 general conference.

== Early life and education ==
Jensen was born in Huntsville, Utah. At 19, he served as a missionary for the LDS Church in West Germany. After returning home in 1964, he earned a Bachelor of Science degree in German from Brigham Young University. He earned a Juris Doctor from the University of Utah College of Law in 1970, graduating first in his class.

== Career ==
At the age of 28, he served as bishop of his ward in Huntsville, as had both his father and grandfather. He later served as president of the Huntsville Utah Stake. In 1987 he became a regional representative for the Kaysville Utah and Layton Utah regions.

Professionally, Jensen practiced law in private practice in Ogden, Utah, specializing in business and estate planning. This supported his real passion for living a farming lifestyle. His family operates a ranching enterprise called Jensens' Middle Fork Ranch, in which he is a partner.

In August 2012, Utah Governor Gary Herbert nominated Jensen to serve on the Utah State Board of Regents, which oversees the state's colleges and universities.

=== General authority ===
In 1989, Jensen became a member of the First Quorum of the Seventy at the age of 46. In 1993, he was made assistant executive director of the church's Priesthood Department, later becoming executive director until 2001. From 1993 to 1995, while a general authority, Jensen served as president of the church's New York Rochester Mission. In 1995, Jensen became a member of the church's Public Affairs Committee. From 1996 to 1998 he was executive director of the Church Historical Department. He served in the First Quorum of the Seventy until 1998, when he became a member of the Presidency of the Seventy, and in 2000 he also became the general president of the church's Sunday School. Jensen served in these positions until 2001. In 2004, he replaced D. Todd Christofferson as executive director of the Family and Church History Department, a position he held previously when it was just the Historical Department. In 2005, he became the first Church Historian and Recorder to serve since 1997. He served in this capacity until 2012 and was designated an emeritus general authority in October 2012.

Jensen is one of the few general authorities of the LDS Church who self-identifies as a member of the Democratic Party.

==== Area presidencies ====
Jensen has served in various area presidency positions. As a new Seventy in 1989, he was counselor to John K. Carmack, president of the Utah Central Area. From 1990 to 1992, Jensen served as president of the Utah North Area. He later served first as a counselor, then as president, of the North America Northeast Area. He was president of the Europe Central Area from 2001 to 2003.

==== Church Historian ====
Jensen was Church Historian and Recorder from 2005 to 2012, and executive director of the Church History Department from 2004 to 2012. In these roles and as a church official, Jensen has spoken at General Conference, BYU Women's Conference (1998), BYU Family History and Genealogy Conference (2006), Northern Utah Family History Conference (2006), Yale's American Society of Church History (2007), and the Mormon History Association Conference (2005 and 2007). Jensen has also notably attended various conferences, including the Library of Congress' Worlds of Joseph Smith Symposium (2005) and UVSC's Mormon Studies Conference (2008).

Not a trained historian or academic, Jensen brought a passion to his work; reading widely, gathering scholars, and implementing changes. Observers reported that his contributions "helped transform the Utah-based faith's approach to its history," and saw the church's history department "truly come of age." Terryl Givens said of his legacy, "Marlin Jensen has done more to further the cause of Mormon history than any person of the current generation."

Several major developments occurred during Jensen's leadership over the Church History Department.

- Joseph Smith Papers Project: In 2001, the LDS Church and BYU created the Joseph Smith Papers Project, intended to revise and expand on the longtime work of Dean C. Jessee to collect and publish all known writings of Joseph Smith. Under Jensen, the project expanded into a 30-some volume, multi-year effort endorsed by the National Historical Publications and Records Commission of the National Archives. In 2005, Jensen said this was "the single most significant historical project of our generation".
- Church History Library: Plans were finalized in 2005 to build a new 250,000-square-foot (23,000 m^{2}), 5 floor building near Temple Square to house the church archives and history department staff. It was opened to the general public in June 2009.
- Researchers return to archives: From 1980–1982, the church moved the History Division of the Historical Department to Provo, Utah, to become the Joseph Fielding Smith Institute for Church History at BYU. In late 2004, discussions began about returning researchers to the LDS Archives to increase pace and reduce costs in the Joseph Smith Papers Project. In June 2005, the Joseph Fielding Smith Institute was closed and the staff moved back to the Church Office Building, and in 2009 relocated again to the new Church History Library.
- Church Historian's Press: On February 25, 2008, a new imprint called the Church Historian's Press was announced as the long-awaited publisher for the Joseph Smith Papers. Jensen mentioned the press could be used to publish George Q. Cannon's journals or other documentary works, and perhaps someday narrative histories and biographies that make use of the Church Archives.
- Separate department: On March 12, 2008, the Family and Church History Department was divided into the Family History Department and the Church History Department.
- New Assistant Church Historian called: On March 12, 2008, when the Church History Department was formed, Richard Turley was called as the first Assistant Church Historian since Davis Bitton was released in 1982.
- Mountain Meadows: At the 2007 sesquicentennial of the Mountain Meadows massacre, descendants of the victims petitioned the LDS Church to secure landmark status for its holdings at the Mountain Meadows site. On March 28, 2008, Jensen addressed these families and said the LDS Church would seek National Historic Landmark designation for these properties, which was granted in 2011. He worked to strengthen relationships with the victims' descendants and encouraged publication of a new "no-holds-barred" history, coauthored by Jensen's Assistant, Richard Turley.
- Technological modernization: Thousands of the LDS Church's historical documents were mass digitized and made freely available online, including the Joseph Smith Papers. Historian Jan Shipps called this "a change that is so epochal it would be very hard to turn it back." In addition to developing a new church-wide system for digitally collecting and managing records, the Church History Library's searchable catalog was made available online. A five-year plan was developed for using technology to preserve and share LDS history.
- International history: The Church History Department decentralized its collecting of international church history. Church Historians were called for individual Areas and countries, and oral histories were to be gathered from mission presidents and area presidents when they were released. Before this time, little had been done to gather international church history. Jensen saw this project as "one of the significant accomplishments in this period of time."
- Historical professionalism: Jensen worked to make the Church History Department authoritative and trusted within the LDS Church, as well as by "historians who write from different points of view". Jensen strained to make archive materials more publicly available and to set the tone of "unflinching honesty ... for a whole new generation of LDS academics." He attended academic conferences and was the first LDS general authority at the Mormon History Association annual meeting.

In January 2012, it was announced that, after a transition period, Steven E. Snow would replace Jensen as the Church Historian and Recorder later in the year. Snow succeeded Jensen on August 1, 2012. On October 6, 2012, Jensen was then released from the First Quorum of the Seventy and designated as an emeritus general authority at the LDS Church's semi-annual general conference. LDS Church practice is to release Seventies from service following their 70th birthdays, which Jensen had observed in May of that year.

== Major statements ==
Jensen at times addressed the press or public as a church representative. He often acted as a peacemaker, attempting to bring understanding or empathy to divisive issues. While not always official church positions, his statements illustrated his candid views as a leader within the LDS Church.

=== Political parties ===
On April 22, 1998, Jensen was sent by the First Presidency to give an interview with the Salt Lake Tribune in reaction to a 1998 First Presidency statement and to explicitly state that someone could be a devout Mormon and a member of the Democratic Party. He lamented the decline of the Utah Democratic Party, and regretted that the Republican Party might be seen as the "church party". He felt that good Latter-day Saints will have conflicts with either party's platform, from which they must selectively pick and choose.

Coming from a church official on assignment from the First Presidency, the comments surprised many prominent Utah politicians and Latter-day Saints.

=== The Mormons (PBS) ===
Jensen featured prominently in the 2007 PBS documentary The Mormons. His March 7, 2006 interview probed a variety of subjects, including some controversial topics.

- Doubt: Jensen described questioning his religion while in philosophy classes where he had to "test [his] belief against ... other theories." This led him to reinforce his faith through deeper study.
- Correlation: "We are really trying to take account of cultural differences and to not feel that this Utah influence or even the American influence has to be worldwide."
- Folklore of the priesthood ban: Jensen recalled his attempts to have the church repudiate the rationale some use to explain the priesthood ban.
- Historical truth claims: "I think we take it very literally. We don't deconstruct and feel that what we have is the figment of language or our imagination, or that there is some middle ground. I know that is very polarizing. In a sense, I think the hardest public relations sell we have to make is that this is the only true church."
- Homosexuality: Jensen said the gospel allows either heterosexuality or celibacy. He empathized with celibate gay members, since the church cannot offer them hope of eventually finding love in this life as it can with single heterosexuals.
- Faith-promoting history: Jensen questioned whether the Church Historian should only focus on reinforcing faith, or if he should also focus on "objective" histories.
- Excommunicable doctrines: Jensen mentioned that members may receive disciplinary action in supporting gay marriage or opposing Book of Mormon divinity, if they are "openly vocal" and "malign the leadership in the church for not adopting that position."

=== Illegal immigrants ===
On February 13, 2008, Jensen urged the Utah State Legislature to show compassion in considering laws that would affect undocumented immigrants. Several bills were under debate to block undocumented access to jobs and public benefits, such as in-state tuition and driving privilege cards. On behalf of the First Presidency at Westminster College's Interfaith Dialogue on Immigration, Jensen said lawmakers should "take a step back" since this "deal[s] with God's children" and "a more humane approach is warranted".

=== Historical openness ===
In a February 25, 2008 press release about the new Church Historian's Press publishing the Joseph Smith Papers, Jensen offered instruction on how to approach church history. He asked for LDS historians to "not be in an apologetic mode, but to be as open, candid and fair about our own history as we can". They should foster a culture of mutual openness with the general historical community. Jensen observed, "greater dialogue coming about, less suspicion and a greater openness that is coming to pass".

=== FLDS polygamy ===
On May 5, 2008, Jensen officially responded to Timothy Egan's New York Times op-ed piece which claimed that FLDS polygamy "is a look back at some of the behavior of Mormonism's founding fathers". Jensen strongly disagreed and pointed out that by 19th-century norms a 15-year-old bride was not unusual nor considered abused and the "common-law marriage age for women was 12". Plural marriages were "not controlled by the authority of one individual" and "the consent of individual women was always honored in any marriage proposal". In addition, many 19th-century polygamous wives were well-educated, politically active professionals.

=== Gay marriage ===
On September 19, 2010, members of the Oakland, California stake were invited to share with Jensen their experiences and troubles over the LDS Church's involvement in the Proposition 8 campaign to ban gay marriage in California. After several recounted their painful experiences, Jensen responded with empathy and a personal apology, saying, "To the full extent of my capacity, I say that I am sorry .... I know that many very good people have been deeply hurt, and I know that the Lord expects better of us."

=== Modern apostasy ===
At the invitation of Utah State University professor Philip Barlow, Jensen held a "Q&A" with a Mormon Studies student group on November 11, 2011. Jensen was asked whether church leaders knew members were discovering problems with LDS Church history online, and what to do for those who may be affected or "who are already leaving in droves". Jensen responded that top church leaders "realize that, maybe, since Kirtland we've never had a period of, I'll call it apostasy, like we're having right now, largely over these issues." He said a new church initiative would give answers to troubling questions, and such issues should be discussed more openly with the new internet-savvy generation. A student recorded these remarks and circulated them online, and Reuters picked them up in a "Special Report". Jensen later clarified that critics were overstating his remarks, saying "To say we are experiencing some Titanic-like wave of apostasy is inaccurate."

== Personal life ==
Jensen married Kathleen Bushnell on June 9, 1967, in the Salt Lake Temple. They have eight children.

== Publications ==
=== Articles ===
- Jensen, Marlin K.; Sandra Stallings Jenkins (June 1990). "Friend to Friend". The Friend: 6.
- —— (November 18, 1990). "Follow the Gospel Plan". (Fireside address). Provo, Utah: J. Reuben Clark Law School, Brigham Young University.
- —— (1993). "Loving with the Spirit and with the Understanding". Devotional and Fireside Speeches, 1992-93. pp. 91–99. Archived from the original on 2006-09-01.
- —— (October 1994). "A Union of Love and Understanding". Ensign: 46–51.
- —— (1996). "Living After the Manner of Happiness". Speeches (Brigham Young University) 1995-96. pp. 29–37. Archived from the original on 2006-09-01.
- —— (1997). "Martin Harris". Heroes of the Restoration. Salt Lake City: Bookcraft. ISBN 1-57008-291-X.
- —— (Fall 1997). "Where Art Thou?: Answering God's Interrogatories" (PDF). Clark Memorandum. Provo, Utah: J. Reuben Clark Law Society: 2–7.
- —— (1998). "Gospel Doctrines—Anchors to Our Souls". BYU Women's Conference.
- —— (1999). "Upon These We Bestow More Abundant Honor". In Ronald W. Walker; Doris R. Dant (eds.). Nearly Everything Imaginable: The Everyday Life of Utah's Mormon Pioneers. Provo: BYU Studies, Joseph Fielding Smith Institute for Latter-day Saint History. pp. 3–26.
- —— (August 1999). "How to Be Happy". New Era: 4–7.
- —— (2000). "May the Kingdom of God Go Forth". 29th Sperry Symposium: Out of Obscurity. Salt Lake City: Deseret Book. pp. 1–15.
- —— (June 2001). "Making a Mighty Change". New Era: 4–7.
- ——; Melvin Leavitt (June 2006). "Friend to Friend: My Brother Gary". The Friend: 8–9.
- —— (Spring 2008). "Church History: Past, Present and Future". Journal of Mormon History. 34 (2). Mormon History Association: 20–42.
- —— (October 2008). "Gospel Doctrines: Anchors to Our Souls". Ensign: 58–61.
- —— (July 2009). "The Joseph Smith Papers: The Manuscript Revelation Books". Ensign: 46–51.
- —— (2009). "Those Who Are Different". Religious Educator. 10 (2). Religious Studies Center, Brigham Young University: 15–18.
- —— (2010). "Making a Case for Church History". In Steven C. Harper; Richard E. Turley, Jr. (eds.). Preserving the History of the Latter-day Saints. Provo: Religious Studies Center, BYU. pp. 1–18.
- —— (Fall 2011). "The Rest of the Story: Latter-day Saint Relations with Utah's Native Americans" (PDF). Mormon Historical Studies. 12 (2): 17–25.
- —— (Spring 2013). "Minding the House of Church History: Reflections of a Church Historian at the End of His Time". Journal of Mormon History. 39 (2): 78–90. doi:10.2307/24243896. JSTOR 24243896. S2CID 254479653.

=== General Conference addresses ===
- —— (November 1989). "An Eye Single to the Glory of God". Ensign: 27–28.
- —— (May 1994). "The Power of a Good Life". Ensign: 47–49.
- —— (May 1999). "Friendship: A Gospel Principle". Ensign: 64–65.
- —— (May 2001). "To Walk Humbly with Thy God". Ensign: 9–11.
- —— (May 2007). "Remember and Perish Not". Ensign: 36–38.

=== Interviews ===
- Jensen, Marlin K. (May 1993). "A Conversation on Preparing Ourselves for the Temple". Ensign.
- ——; John K. Carmack (June 1997). "Conversation: Church Museum Strengthens Members and Visitors". Ensign: 77–78.
- ——; Harrie, Dan (August 1998). "'To Have a Robust, Multi-Party System': Transcript of Salt Lake Tribune Interview with Elder Marlin K. Jensen" (PDF). Sunstone. 21 (3): 82–87.
- ——; Christensen, Tom (August 13, 2005). "Historian from Huntsville". Ogden Standard-Examiner: 4E–5E.
- ——; Boone, David F. (2007). "A Historian by Yearning: A Conversation with Elder Marlin K. Jensen". Religious Educator. 8 (3). Religious Studies Center: 1–13.
- —— (December 2007). "There Shall Be a Record Kept among You". Ensign: 28–33.
- ——; Sheri L. Dew (December 24, 2012). "Conversations: Elder Marlin K. Jensen". Mormon Channel.
