= Arnold Friberg =

American illustrator and painter (1913–2010)

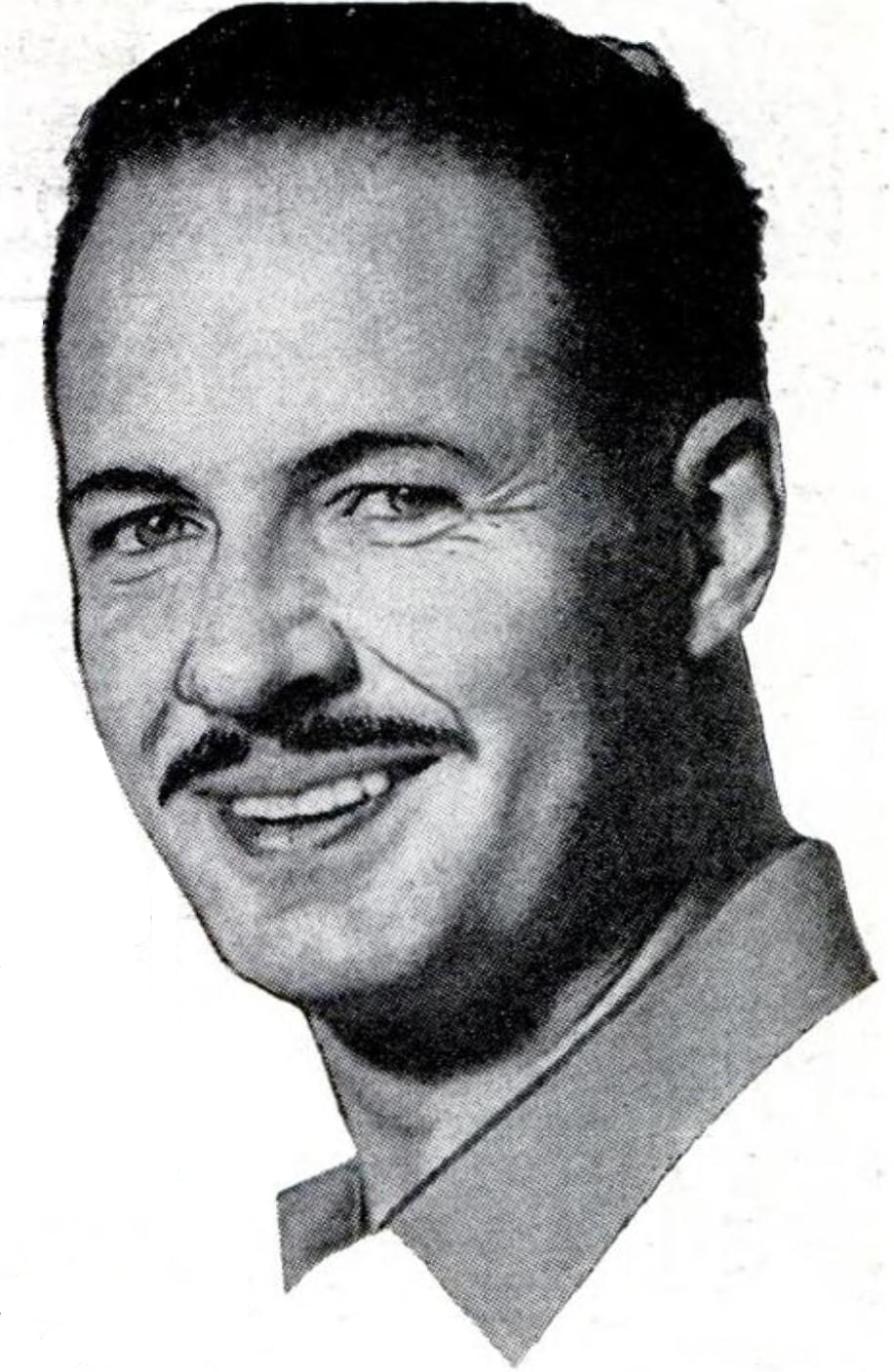
- Friberg c. 1949
- Born: December 21, 1913; Winnetka, Illinois, U.S.
- Died: July 1, 2010 (aged 96); Salt Lake City, Utah, U.S.
- Known for: Oil painting
- Notable work: The Prayer at Valley Forge

The Prayer at Valley Forge, representative Friberg painting.

Arnold Friberg (December 21, 1913 – July 1, 2010) was an American illustrator and painter of religious and patriotic works. One example is his 1975 painting The Prayer at Valley Forge, a depiction of George Washington praying at Valley Forge. He is also known for his 15 "pre-visualization" paintings for the Cecil B. DeMille film The Ten Commandments which were used to promote the film worldwide and for which he received an Academy Award nomination.

Friberg was appointed a lifetime member of the Royal Society of Arts. He also painted a series of scenes from the Book of Mormon for Adele Cannon Howells, the Primary President of the Church of Jesus Christ of Latter-day Saints.

== Life and career ==
=== Early life and education ===
Friberg was born to a Swedish father and a Norwegian mother. His family moved to Arizona when he was three years old, and he began drawing cartoons by the time he was seven. When he was seven, Friberg's parents joined the Church of Jesus Christ of Latter-day Saints. Friberg was baptized a member of the LDS Church at age eight.

While in high school, Friberg learned by meeting with the artists at The Arizona Republic, and earned money by creating signs for local businesses while being apprenticed to a local sign painter.

After graduating from high school, Friberg attended the Chicago Academy of Fine Arts, working for various local printers doing commercial art while attending school and for several years afterward. This included calendar work for the Northwest Paper Company, for whom he created paintings of Mounties. Friberg has created more than 200 paintings depicting Mounties, and he is the only American made an honorary member of the Royal Canadian Mounted Police (RCMP). In 1940, Friberg moved to New York City and studied with Norman Rockwell under the artist Harvey Dunn at the Grand Central School of Art.

With the outbreak of World War II Friberg left the Grand Central School of Art and joined the United States Army serving in the 86th Infantry Division. He had an offer of the rank of captain to draw recruitment posters for the United States Army Air Corps but chose instead to go to the front. He did, however, use his art skills in combat to draw maps.

=== Move to Utah ===
Shortly after the end of the war and setting up shop in San Francisco, Friberg married Hedve Baxter. He made it big creating a series of paintings depicting Western scenes for a calendar company in 1948. Friberg moved to Utah in 1950 in order to begin teaching commercial art at the University of Utah. This was partly due to having become friends with Avard Fairbanks on a previous visit to Salt Lake City and also a result of doctors recommending that Hedve move to a drier climate for her health.

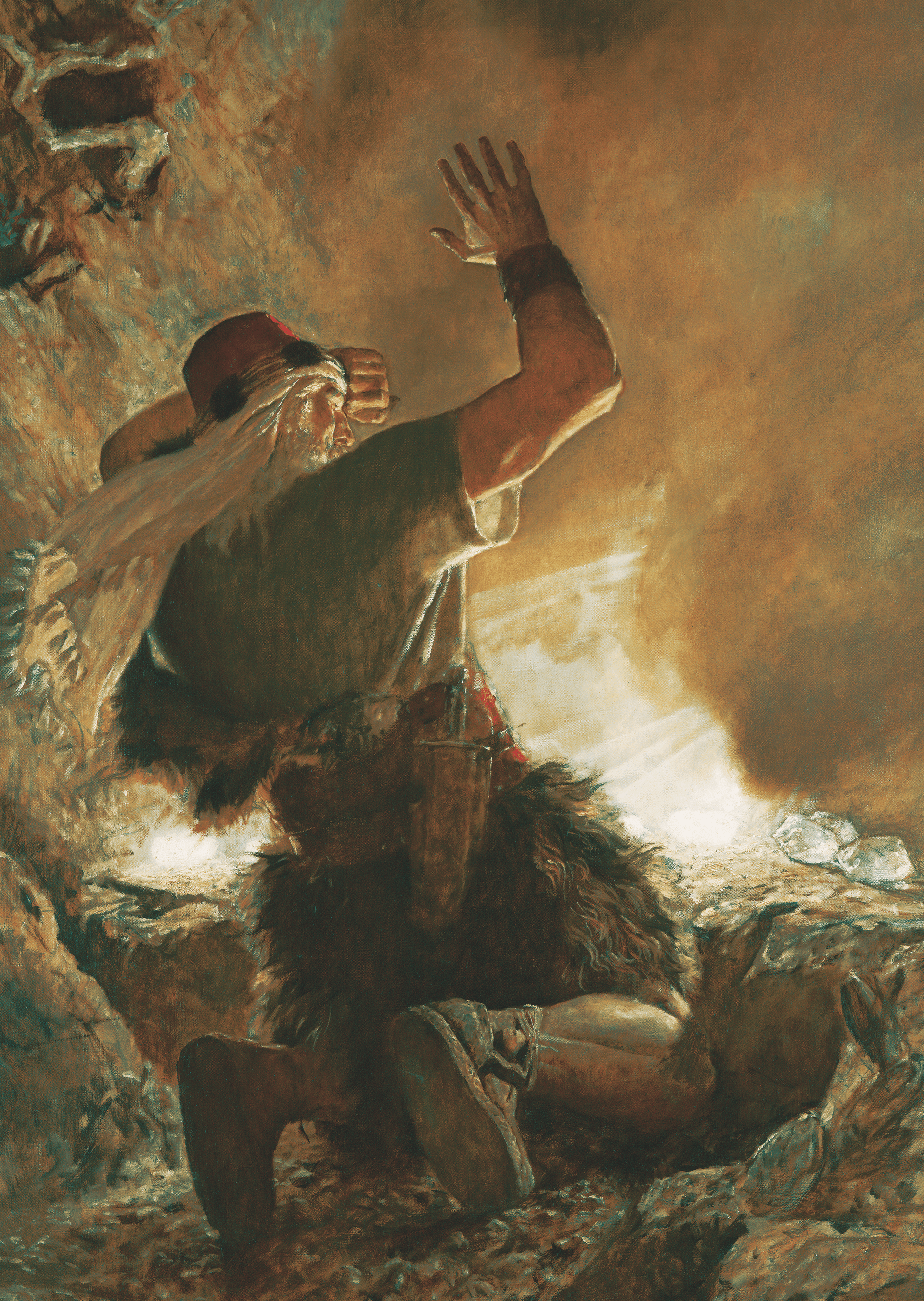
The Brother of Jared Sees The Finger of The Lord, a Friberg painting commissioned by Howells for The Children's Friend

When the Fribergs arrived in Utah, Arnold was asked to commemorate a centennial event by recreating on canvas the first pioneer Sunday school taught by Richard Ballantyne. Delighted with the painting, Adele Cannon Howells, the Primary President of the Church of Jesus Christ of Latter-day Saints wanted to commission Friberg to create twelve paintings depicting the Book of Mormon for The Primary's published magazine called The Children's Friend. Financing for taking on such a project was an obstacle as there was not enough in the budget of the magazine to cover the cost of an artist, nor would the church supply any funding. Therefore, Howells funded the project herself by selling her own land.

At the time, reproductions and special editions were printed and sold, however no one knew these paintings would have so much impact that the Church would decide to put them in all copies of the Book of Mormon. They also caught the eye of Hollywood scouts searching for an artist for Cecil B. DeMille's epic motion picture The Ten Commandments. DeMille was shown some of Friberg's paintings by a publisher friend and hired him. Starting in 1953, Friberg spent three years in Hollywood as DeMille's chief artist and designer working on the previsualization paintings for The Ten Commandments. Friberg's paintings included costume design for the main characters, for which he received a nomination for an Academy Award.

In 1968, Friberg was commissioned by Chevrolet to create a series of paintings showing the greatest moments in college football, including The First Game, played in New Brunswick, New Jersey on November 6, 1869, between Rutgers College and the visiting College of New Jersey, for use in their 1969 advertising campaign. After extensive research on the location during winter and the equipment and gear used by Revolutionary War soldiers, Friberg created his 1975 painting The Prayer at Valley Forge. This depicts George Washington praying while the Continental Army winters at Valley Forge in Pennsylvania during 1777 and 1778. In 1977, he was commissioned to create a series of saloon paintings for the Golden Nugget in Las Vegas, Nevada.

Due to his previous work with the RCMP, Friberg was commissioned to paint the Prince of Wales and his horse Centennial (great-grandson of Man o' War). This led to an additional commission in 1990 to paint a portrait of Queen Elizabeth II, also with Centennial. Both portraits were painted at Buckingham Palace.

Friberg died on July 1, 2010, at the age of 96, while recovering from hip replacement surgery in a Salt Lake City care center.

== Partial list of works ==
Listed alphabetically by title.

Title	Year	Commissioned by	Notes
Abinadi Before the King Noah	1952–1955	Adele C. Howells	The Children's Friend
Alma baptizes in the waters of Mormon	1952–1955	Adele C. Howells	The Children's Friend
Ammon Defends the Flocks	1952–1955	Adele C. Howells	The Children's Friend
The Building of the City	1953	Cecil B. DeMille	Ten Commandments
The Risen Lord	1952–1955	Adele C. Howells	The Children's Friend
The Consecration of Joshua	1953	Cecil B. DeMille	Ten Commandments
Dinner Companions			Western
Death of the Firstborn of Egypt	1953	Cecil B. DeMille	Ten Commandments
At the End of the Day	1994		Native American
The Finding of the Infant Moses	1953	Cecil B. DeMille	Ten Commandments
The Fight at Jethro's Well	1953	Cecil B. DeMille	Ten Commandments
The Finger of the Lord	1952–1955	Adele C. Howells	The Children's Friend
The First Game	1968	Chevrolet	1869 New Jersey vs. Rutgers football game, first college football game ever played
The First Passover	1953	Cecil B. DeMille	Ten Commandments
Following the Star			
Gentleman's Foursome			Western
The Giving of the Law	1953	Cecil B. DeMille	Ten Commandments
The Great Exodus Begins	1953	Cecil B. DeMille	Ten Commandments
Her Hero	1989		Native American
Heritage of the Lord			
His First Ride			Western
H.R.H. Prince Charles with his great horse "Centennial"	1978	The British Royal Family	Buckingham Palace
Into New Country	2006		Native American
Into The Valley	1995		Native American
Knute Rockne at Notre Dame	1968	Chevrolet	College football
Lehi and his people arrive in the Promised Land	1952–1955	Adele C. Howells	The Children's Friend
The Liahona	1952–1955	Adele C. Howells	The Children's Friend
The Light and the Law	1953	Cecil B. DeMille	Ten Commandments
The Light of Christ			
Long Trail West			Western
Maintaining the Right			R.C.M.P
Mind If I Join You, Gentlemen?			Western
Moses Before Pharaoh	1953	Cecil B. DeMille	Ten Commandments
Mormon Bids Farewell to a Once Great Nation	1952–1955	Adele Cannon Howells	The Children's Friend
Moses and the Burning Bush	1953	Cecil B. DeMille	Ten Commandments
Moses and Sephora	1953	Cecil B. DeMille	Ten Commandments
Nephi Subdues His Rebellious Brothers	1952–1955	Adele Cannon Howells	The Children's Friend
The Night Christ Was Born			
O.J. Simpson Breaks For Daylight	1968	Chevrolet	College football – 1967 USC vs. UCLA
Parley in the Forest			Native American, Western
The Parting of the Red Sea	1953	Cecil B. DeMille	Ten Commandments
The Passing Game	1968	Chevrolet	College football – Alabama vs. Tennessee, 1934
Peace Be Still			
The Pillar of Fire	1953	Cecil B. DeMille	Ten Commandments
The Prayer at Valley Forge	1975		George Washington at Valley Forge
Puffing Billy			R.C.M.P.
Queen Elizabeth II and "Centennial"	1990	The British Royal Family	Buckingham Palace
The Risen Lord			
Samuel the Lamanite on the Wall	1952–1955	Adele Cannon Howells	The Children's Friend
Shepherds in the Field			
Tales of the Force			R.C.M.P.
Thunder Wagon			Western
Title of Liberty	1952–1955	Adele Cannon Howells	The Children's Friend
Trail Ends at the Sea			R.C.M.P.
Trouble for Butterfield			Native American, Western
Two Thousand Young Warriors	1952–1955	Adele Cannon Howells	The Children's Friend
Uncertain Odds			Western
The Wagon Wedge			Western
Waters of Manitou			Native American
When the Land Was His			Native American
Winners and Losers			Western
Winter at Valley Forge			George Washington at Valley Forge
Word of the Lord	1953	Cecil B. DeMille	Ten Commandments
The Worship of the Golden Calf	1953	Cecil B. DeMille	Ten Commandments
Yielding the Right of Way			Western

== See also ==
- Mormon art
