= May Green Hinckley =

American Mormon leader

3rd General President of the Primary
- 1940 – May 2, 1943
- Called by: Heber J. Grant
- Predecessor: May Anderson
- Successor: Adele C. Howells

Personal details
- Born: May Green; May 1, 1881; Brampton, Derbyshire, UK
- Died: May 2, 1943 (aged 62); Salt Lake City, Utah, US
- Resting place: Wasatch Lawn Memorial Park; 40.698°N 111.842°W
- Spouse(s): Bryant S. Hinckley
- Children: stepmother of Gordon B. Hinckley
- Parents: William Green; Lucy Marsden

May Green Hinckley (May 1, 1881 – May 2, 1943) was the third Primary general president of the Church of Jesus Christ of Latter-day Saints (LDS Church) from 1940 until her death. She was the stepmother of Gordon B. Hinckley, fifteenth president of the LDS Church.

== Biography ==
Green was born in Brampton, Derbyshire, England. Her mother had joined the LDS Church three years before Green's birth, but her father never joined. She emigrated to the United States with her mother and some of her siblings in 1889. Green was baptized into the LDS Church in 1891, and was by then living in Salt Lake City.

Green was raised in the church's Salt Lake 5th Ward. Early on she was a teacher in both the Sunday School and the Young Women Mutual Improvement Association (YWMIA). She served as a missionary for the church in the Central States Mission from 1907 to 1909.

After studying booking and accounting, Green began work as business manager for a Salt Lake medical clinic.

In 1920, Green was made president of the YLMIA of the Granite Stake in Salt Lake City. She served in this position for the next 12 years, and oversaw the initial establishment of the Gleaner program.

In 1932, at the age of 50, Green married Bryant S. Hinckley, whose wife, Ada, had died in 1930. At the time, five of Hinckley's 13 children were still living at home. At that time, Green was president of the stake YWMIA. One of the children, Gordon B. Hinckley, later recalled that he and the other children were upset by their father's decision to remarry, but they eventually came to accept their stepmother: "I don't know that it was easy for her to step into our family, but she did it well. We all respected her. We all loved her". In 1935, when Bryant Hinckley became president of the Northern States Mission based in Chicago, May Hinckley went with him and presided over the Primary Association, YWMIA, and Relief Society within the mission.

In 1940, May Hinckley was asked by church president Heber J. Grant to succeed May Anderson and become the third general president of the church's Primary Association. In her 3 1/2-year tenure, Hinckley introduced a revised curriculum, added a scripture-reading program for leaders and teachers, established a formal scriptural theme for Primary, and selected the official Primary logo, motto and colors.

Hinckley formed a committee that created lessons for use by Primaries in missions (as opposed to stakes). With energy rationing as a result of World War II, she oversaw the creation of more home-based Primary programs.

Hinckley was the editor of The Children's Friend while she was the Primary General President. Her term ended when she unexpectedly died of pneumonia in Salt Lake City, Utah, the day after her 62nd birthday. She was succeeded by Adele C. Howells, her first counselor.

== See also ==
- LaVern W. Parmley: second counselor to Hinckley

== Notes ==
The Church of Jesus Christ of Latter-day Saints titles
Preceded by May Anderson	President of the Primary; 1940 – May 2, 1943	Succeeded by Adele C. Howells
