= Ensign (LDS magazine) =

Mormon magazine (1971–2020)

- Frequency: Monthly
- Publisher: The Church of Jesus Christ of Latter-day Saints
- First issue: January 1971
- Final issue: December 2020
- Country: United States
- Language: English
- Website: Ensign
- ISSN: 0013-8606

The Ensign of The Church of Jesus Christ of Latter-day Saints, commonly shortened to Ensign (/ˈɛnsaɪn/ EN-syne), was an official periodical of the Church of Jesus Christ of Latter-day Saints (LDS Church) from 1971 to 2020. The magazine was first issued in January 1971, along with the correlated New Era (for youth) and the Friend (for children). Each of these magazines replaced the older church publications The Improvement Era, Relief Society Magazine, The Instructor, and the Millennial Star. Unlike some of its predecessors, the Ensign contained no advertisements.

As an official church publication, the Ensign contained faith-promoting and proselytizing information, stories, sermons, and writings of church leaders.

For many years, the May and November editions of the Ensign provided reports of the proceedings of the church's annual and semi-annual general conferences. These issues contain the full sermons and business of the conferences, as well as a current photographic list of the church's general authorities and general officers.

The text of every issue of the magazine is available on the church's web site. Each issue since January 2001 is also available in PDF format.

In April 2018, the magazine discontinued its First Presidency message, an article traditionally found at the front of the magazine written by a member of the church's First Presidency. This message was traditionally used by home teachers for a lesson as they visited their assigned families. This change coincided with the church's revamping of the home teaching program into ministering.

In August 2020, the LDS Church announced that the Ensign would cease publication at the end of 2020 and would be replaced by the English-language version of Liahona. The final issue was dated December 2020.

== Editors ==
The magazine's editors included the following, with all those beginning with Dean L. Larsen being general authority seventies:

- Doyle L. Green (1971–1975)
- Dean L. Larsen (1977–1978)
- James E. Faust (1979)
- M. Russell Ballard (1980–1984)
- Carlos E. Asay (1985–1986)
- Joseph B. Wirthlin (1986)
- Hugh W. Pinnock (1987–1989)
- Rex D. Pinegar (1990–1994)
- Joe J. Christensen (1994–1995)
- Jack H. Goaslind (1996–1998)
- Marlin K. Jensen (1999–2000)
- Dennis B. Neuenschwander (2001–2004)
- Jay E. Jensen (2005–2008)
- Spencer J. Condie (2008–2010)
- Paul B. Pieper (2010–2012)
- Craig A. Cardon (2012–2015)
- Joseph W. Sitati (2015–2017)
- Hugo E. Martinez (2017–2018)
- Randy D. Funk (2018–2020)

== See also ==
- List of Latter Day Saint periodicals
- Herald (Community of Christ)
