= LaVern W. Parmley =

5th General President of the Primary
- 1951 – 1974
- Predecessor: Adele C. Howells
- Successor: Naomi M. Shumway

First Counselor in the general presidency of the Primary
- 1943 – 1951
- Called by: Adele C. Howells
- Predecessor: Adele C. Howells
- Successor: Arta M. Hale

Second Counselor in the general presidency of the Primary
- 1942 – 1943
- Called by: May Green Hinckley
- Predecessor: Janet M. Thompson
- Successor: Dessie G. Boyle

Personal details
- Born: LaVern Watts; January 1, 1900; Murray, Utah, United States
- Died: January 27, 1980 (aged 79–80); Salt Lake City, Utah, United States
- Resting place: Salt Lake City Cemetery; 40.777°N 111.858°W
- Occupation: Physics professor
- Employer: University of Utah
- Notable works: Editor of The Children's Friend and The Friend
- Spouse(s): Thomas J. Parmley
- Children: 3
- Awards: Silver Buffalo

LaVern Watts Parmley (January 1, 1900 – January 27, 1980) was the fifth general president of the Primary of the Church of Jesus Christ of Latter-day Saints (LDS Church). Parmley was the first woman to be awarded the Silver Buffalo Award from the Boy Scouts of America.

LaVern Watts was born in Murray, Utah. She married Thomas J. Parmley, a physics professor at the University of Utah.

In 1942, Parmley was asked to become the second counselor to May Green Hinckley in the general presidency of the Primary. She served in this capacity until Hinckley's death the following year. When first counselor Adele C. Howells succeeded Hinckley, Parmley was asked to be her first counselor, and she remained in this position until 1951, when Howells was released and Parmley was selected to succeed her as the fifth general president of the Primary. Parmley served as Primary president until she was succeeded by Naomi M. Shumway in 1974; in total, she served 23 years as president and 32 years as a member of the presidency.

During Parmley's tenure, Scouting was integrated into the Primary program for boys ages eight through eleven. The Primary curriculum was also revised and became more centered on teaching doctrines of the LDS Church. "I Am a Child of God", written by Naomi W. Randall and Mildred T. Pettit, was introduced to Primary in 1957 and CTR rings were introduced in 1970.

From 1951 until 1970, Parmley was the final editor of The Children's Friend. Parmley oversaw its phase-out and the launch of the church's new magazine for children, The Friend.

Parmley was the first woman to sit on a national Scout committee in the United States and in 1976 became the first female recipient of the Boy Scouts of America's Silver Buffalo Award.

Parmley died in Salt Lake City, Utah, and was buried in the Salt Lake City Cemetery. In 2003, one of her sons, William W. Parmley, became a member of the Second Quorum of the Seventy, a general authority of the LDS Church.

== See also ==
- List of recipients of the Silver Buffalo Award

The Church of Jesus Christ of Latter-day Saints titles
Preceded by Adele C. Howells	President of the Primary; 1951 – 1974	Succeeded by Naomi M. Shumway
Preceded by Adele C. Howells	First Counselor in the general presidency of the Primary; 1943 – 1951	Succeeded by Arta M. Hale
Preceded by Janet M. Thompson	Second Counselor in the general presidency of the Primary; 1942 – 1943	Succeeded by Dessie G. Boyle
