= Ardyth Kennelly =

American novelist

- Kennelly in 1994
- Born: April 15, 1912; Glenada, Oregon, United States
- Died: January 19, 2005 (aged 92); Vancouver, Washington, United States
- Occupation: Novelist

Ardyth Matilda Kennelly (April 15, 1912 – January 19, 2005) was an American novelist, with five novels published between 1949 and 1956 and two published posthumously, in 2014 and 2026. Kennelly was born in Glenada, Oregon, and briefly lived in Salt Lake City, before moving back to Albany, Oregon. She attended Albany High School, where she graduated in 1929. After high school, she attended Oregon State College for three years, but she did not graduate. Before her career as a novelist, Kennelly wrote stories for The Manuscript while she attended Oregon State College, the Improvement Era, and pulp magazines. Kennelly wrote five novels that were published during her lifetime: The Peaceable Kingdom; The Spur; Good Morning, Young Lady; Up Home; and Marry Me, Carry Me. Two novels, Variation West and Millionaire Housekeeping, were published posthumously, as were two memoirs: Bodies Adjacent, and New York on $5 a Day. Kennelly developed a second career as a collage and mixed media construction artist. Her work was featured in two exhibits, in 1996 and 2000. Kennelly moved to Vancouver, Washington, late in life to be with her sister, where she died at the age of 92.

== Life ==
Kennelly's parents were James Daniel Kennelly, from an Irish Catholic family, and Lulu "Lula" Amanda Olsen, from a Norwegian-Swedish Mormon family; both were born in Utah. Ardyth was born in Glenada, Oregon, on April 15, 1912. The family soon moved to North Albany, Oregon, where Lula's brother George Rudolph Olsen and his family lived; but when Ardyth was about three, the Kennellys—now with another daughter, Marion, born April 12, 1915—moved back to Salt Lake City, Utah. James was killed in an accident on the job in April 1921; Lula and her daughters then moved into Salt Lake City's Constitution Building, where her mother, Anna Matilda Johnson Olsen, lived and had her chiropractic office. The Kennellys moved back to North Albany in 1922, and in May of the following year, Lula married a widowed neighbor, Hiram Parker.

Kennelly graduated from Albany High School in 1929 and attended Oregon State College for three years, though she did not graduate. A number of her stories and poems were published in the campus literary magazine, The Manuscript. She moved to Portland in 1935 and worked for a time on the WPA Federal Writers' Project.

Kennelly married Howard Scott Gibbs, a friend from Albany, in 1935; they divorced in January 1940, and in October of that year she married Egon V. Ullman, an ENT physician who had emigrated from Vienna, Austria. Because of the war, Kennelly moved to Salt Lake City and various East Coast postings with Ullman, who had enlisted as a medical officer in the U.S. Air Force. She was widowed in 1962. Except for brief periods spent in New York City (1963–64) and a farmhouse near Monmouth, Oregon (1969–72), she lived in downtown Portland for the next 40 years.

Toward the end of her life, Kennelly moved to Vancouver to be near her sister and died there on January 19, 2005, at the age of 92.

== Improvement Era (1930–1936) ==
Except for about two dozen poems published in a local newspaper in 1927–28 (under the initials A. M. K.), Kennelly began her career at the age of 18 with the publication of three poems in the Improvement Era, a publication of the Church of Jesus Christ of Latter-day Saints, in 1930. Between September of that year and January 1936, she published 28 poems and five short stories in the LDS periodical. Although the majority of this work is considered sentimental and focused on love and romance, sub-themes appear as well, hinting at the insight into mature love, motherhood, death, and the restorative workings of faith and nature (including human nature) that are expressed in The Peaceable Kingdom.

Kennelly's Improvement Era poetry is about romantic love. Her stories typically end happily, but are varied in theme. How Lovely Youth focuses exclusively on young love; it concerns a young man returning from his two-year church missionary work. Some Beautiful Way is about motherhood and step-motherhood, and the convergence of the internal realities of a little girl and her stepmother. And Afterward Came Spring is about death and a crisis of faith.

Fire and Song is, in the words of its author, "a story of Faith". However, she states, "I'm nineteen. I tell you because I want you to understand if this tremendous theme is handled clumsily and a little—too breathlessly."

Another Kennelly story, That Day Was Grand, 1935, is told from the point of view of a young schoolgirl who idolizes a woman whom she considers the epitome of female beauty and perfection, possessing that ineffable quality of "cool". In the story, Kennelly reveals the character Rose's egotism, unattractive lifestyle and taste, slovenliness, shallow values and poor judgment, and her likely fate should she continue to walk the path she has chosen. Rose is not evil by any means, but she is dangerous to herself and dangerous to young Laurel through the influence she could exert if not for the watchfulness and wisdom of Laurel's mother and grandmother. Rose's character is revealed through Laurel's words and the words of others as Laurel reports them.

== Novelist (1949–2005) ==
Kennelly's first novel, The Peaceable Kingdom, was based on stories from the life of her maternal grandmother; it was published in 1949 and was a Literary Guild selection for December of that year. Mary A. Drayton adapted The Peaceable Kingdom into a comedic stage production in 1952. The Spur (1951) is a fictionalized treatment of the last days of John Wilkes Booth. The Spur went to television via the Philco Television Playhouse in October 1951. Good Morning, Young Lady (also a Literary Guild selection, in 1953) is a fictional coming of age novel but includes anecdotes based on the life of Butch Cassidy. Up Home (1955) is a sequel to The Peaceable Kingdom, and Marry Me, Carry Me (1956) is based partly on the early years of Kennelly's mother's marriage. The author's final novel, Variation West, was published posthumously, in November 2014. Like The Peaceable Kingdom and Up Home, it begins with stories of domestic life under polygamy in nineteenth-century Salt Lake City, but this novel follows its main characters and their descendants into the 1960s.

In her memoir Bodies Adjacent, published in 2023, Kennelly wrote about her life with her husband Egon V. Ullman; in the middle of the memoir, she placed the journal he kept on and off from 1947 to 1956. Her second memoir, New York on $5 a Day, was published in 2024 and describes her 1963–64 sojourn in that city. Her short novel Millionaire Housekeeping, written probably around 1970 and published in 2026, follows a young woman as she rises from dining-hall maid to superintending housekeeper in a millionaire's household in early-twentieth-century New York City.

At her death in 2005, Kennelly also left some unpublished poetry and shorter writings, as well as a manuscript "History of the World."

=== Late career ===
Late in life, Kennelly developed a second career as an artist, specializing in collages and mixed media constructions. She had two exhibits. The first was at the Elizabeth Leach Gallery in 1996, and the second in 2000 at the Mark Woolley Gallery in Portland.

== Publications & works ==
=== Art ===
- Collages/mixed media installations, Mark Woolley Gallery, 2000
- Elizabeth Leach Gallery, 1996

=== Memoirs ===
- New York on $5 a Day – Sunnycroft Books, 2024
- Bodies Adjacent: Ardyth's Memoir & Egon's Journal – Sunnycroft Books, 2023

=== Novels ===
- Millionaire Housekeeping - Sunnycroft Books, 2026
- Variation West – Sunnycroft Books, 2014
- Marry Me, Carry Me – Houghton Mifflin Co., 1956
- Up Home – Houghton Mifflin Co., 1955
- Good Morning, Young Lady – Houghton Mifflin Co., 1953
- The Spur – Julian Messner, New York, 1951
- The Peaceable Kingdom – Houghton Mifflin Co., 1949

=== Short stories ===
- "That Day Was Grand" – Improvement Era, v. 38 no. 5, May 1935
- "Some Beautiful Way" – Improvement Era, v. 37 no. 2, Feb. 1934
- "She Learned About Love" – All-Story Love Stories, May 5, 1934
- "How Lovely Youth" – Improvement Era, v. 36 no. 10, Aug. 1933
- "Fire and Song" – Improvement Era, v. 35 no. 12, Oct. 1932
- "And Afterward Came Spring" – Improvement Era, v. 35 no. 6, Apr. 1932

=== Poems ===
- "Last Christmas—" – Street & Smith's Love Story Magazine, Dec. 21, 1940
- "Festive" – All-Story Love Tales, Mar. 11, 1939
- "For Spice" – All-Story Love Tales, Nov. 12, 1938
- "Your Gifts I Would Return" – All-Story Love Tales, Feb. 19, 1938
- "My Love Is Here For Tea" – All-Story Love Stories, Jan. 30, 1937
- "There's No Telling" – All-Story Love Stories, May 30, 1936
- "Now That, At Night" – All-Story Love Stories, Mar. 28, 1936
- "Song About Love" – All-Story Love Stories, Mar. 7, 1936
- "On A Restless Night" – Improvement Era, v. 39 no. 1, Jan. 1936
- "On A Long Day" – Improvement Era, v. 39 no. 12, Dec. 1935
- "There Wasn't Much" – Improvement Era, v. 38 no. 10, Oct. 1935
- "Last Straw" – Improvement Era, v. 38 no. 7, Jul. 1935
- "The New Dress" – All-Story Love Stories, Sep. 22, 1934
- "Beyond Belief" – Improvement Era, v. 37 no. 9, Sep. 1934
- "This Moment" – Street & Smith's Love Story Magazine, Aug. 25, 1934
- "Date Tonight" – Improvement Era, v. 37 no. 8, Aug. 1934
- "For the Dark Stranger" – Improvement Era, v. 37 no. 7, Jul. 1934
- "These Things" – Improvement Era, v. 37 no. 6, Jun. 1934
- "End of It" – All-Story Love Stories, May 5, 1934
- "Bride" – All-Story Love Stories, Mar. 24, 1934
- "Memorandum" – Improvement Era, v. 37 no. 2, Feb. 1934
- "Inside Story" – Improvement Era, v. 37 no. 2, Feb. 1934
- "Women Are Dumb" – All-Story Love Stories, Dec. 16, 1933
- "Tune of Hurt" – All-Story Love Stories, Dec. 16, 1933
- "Sixteen Sings" (set of 10 poems) – Improvement Era, v. 36 no. 6, Apr. 1933
- "I Want Peace" – Improvement Era, v. 37 no. 5, Mar. 1933
- "Reincarnated" – Improvement Era, v. 35 no. 9, Jul. 1932
- "Conversation On A Still Afternoon" – Improvement Era, v. 35 no. 6, Apr. 1932
- "The Color of Yesterday" – Improvement Era, v. 35 no. 5, Mar. 1932
- "Cross-Stitch" – Improvement Era, v. 34 no. 9, Jul. 1931
- "Song to Your Coming" – Improvement Era, v. 34 no. 7, May 1931
- "The Party" – Improvement Era, v. 34 no. 2, Dec. 1930
- "Wish" – Improvement Era, v. 33 no. 12, Oct. 1930
- "Shower" – Improvement Era, v. 33 no. 11, Sep. 1930
