= New Era (magazine) =

Official magazine of the LDS Church (1971–2020)

- Frequency: Monthly
- Publisher: The Church of Jesus Christ of Latter-day Saints
- First issue: January 1971
- Final issue: December 2020
- Country: USA
- Based in: Salt Lake City, Utah
- Language: English

The New Era was an official magazine of the Church of Jesus Christ of Latter-day Saints (LDS Church) from 1971 to 2020. First published in January 1971 along with the Ensign and the Friend, the New Era's intended audience was the church's youth. The magazine replaced the similarly themed The Improvement Era, a periodical published from 1897 to 1970.

In its first issue, the editor of the New Era explained the rationale for its creation, stating:

By direction of the First Presidency, the New Era is the publication arm of the Church to the unmarried persons of the kingdom—those from twelve up to marriage. It will reflect those qualities that have given rise to the Lord's confidence in youth: sincerity, authenticity, intellectual stimulation, and inspiration.

== Regular features ==
The New Era regularly included articles written by general authorities of the LDS Church on gospel topics, as well as articles contributed by other church members on topics such as preparing for marriage, media and entertainment, and the family. Poems, artwork, tips for coping with life's challenges, and true stories of inspiration, are also commonplace. Other regular features included questions and answers (a question for the youth (e.g., "How can I know I've truly been forgiven after I've repented?") and readers' responses), and the New Era poster (or MormonAd).

== Replacement ==
In August 2020, the LDS Church announced that the New Era would cease publication in at the end of 2020 and would be replaced by a new magazine named For the Strength of Youth. The final issue was dated December 2020.

== Editors ==
- Doyle L. Green (1971–75)
- Dean L. Larsen (1977–78)
- James E. Faust (1979)
- M. Russell Ballard (1980–84)
- Carlos E. Asay (1985–86)
- Hugh W. Pinnock (1987–89)
- Rex D. Pinegar (1990–94)
- Joe J. Christensen (1994–95)
- Jack H. Goaslind (1996–98)
- Marlin K. Jensen (1999–2000)
- Dennis B. Neuenschwander (2001–04)
- Jay E. Jensen (2005–08)
- Spencer J. Condie (2008–10)
- Paul B. Pieper (2010–12)
- Craig A. Cardon (2012–15)
- Joseph W. Sitati (2015–17)
- Hugo E. Martinez (2017–18)
- Randy D. Funk (2018–22)
- Randall K. Bennett (2022–present)

== See also ==
- Liahona (magazine)
- List of Latter Day Saint periodicals
- Young Men (organization)
- Young Women (organization)
