= Choose the right =

Motto used by The Church of Jesus Christ of Latter-day Saints

'Choose the Right' shield

"Choose the right" is a saying or motto among members of the Church of Jesus Christ of Latter-day Saints (LDS Church) that is taught to children and used by members of the church as a reminder to make choices that will help an individual to live righteously. The phrase is taken from an LDS hymn "Choose the Right" by Joseph L. Townsend and Henry A. Tuckett.

== History ==
The letters CTR, a reference to this phrase, are incorporated into a shield logo designed by Joel Holbrook Izatt Margery Cannon and Lurene Wilkinson who were Primary General Board members in the 1960s. In 1970, a church committee headed by Naomi W. Randall recommended that the shield be incorporated into official church material. Since then, both the phrase and symbol have been used in religious educational materials for LDS youth of Primary age. The symbol is also used in LDS culture by members of all ages, both as a reminder of the motto, as well as an indicator of religious affiliation. The CTR initials, displayed on the shield and in other forms, can be seen mainly on CTR rings as well as other types of jewelry, tee shirts, bookmarks and stationery.

According to the US Patent and Trademark Office, the LDS Church's stylized "CTR" abbreviation and shield with the CTR symbol are trademarked for use on finger ring jewelry by Intellectual Reserve, Inc. The phrase "Choose the Right", however, is not trademarked in the United States and may be used by anyone for commercial purposes.

== CTR ring ==
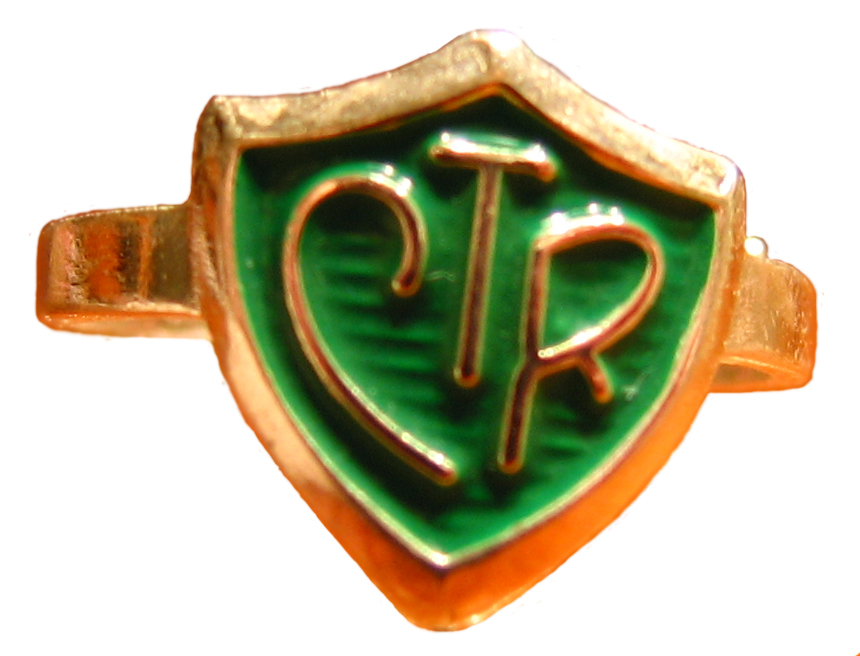
A CTR ring, showing the escutcheon design

A ring with the letters "CTR" on is often worn by members of the LDS Church as a reminder of the "Choose the Right" motto, and as a symbol of their religious affiliation.

CTR rings were introduced at the same time as the CTR shield in 1970 by Primary general president LaVern W. Parmley after being recommended by a committee chaired by Naomi W. Randall. In connection with the children's Sunday School program, each LDS child in this age group is given an adjustable ring with a green escutcheon bearing the letters "CTR" in silver.

Over the years CTR rings have become popular with both children and adults in the LDS Church. They are now available in a variety of designs in over 30 languages.

== See also ==
- Christian ichthys symbol
- What would Jesus do? (WWJD)
