= Ministering =

Home-based religious education in the Church of Jesus Christ of Latter-day Saints

Ministering is the term for Christian service given to fellow congregants—known as ward members—within the Church of Jesus Christ of Latter-day Saints (LDS Church). Before April 1, 2018, a somewhat similar program within the church was termed "home teaching", "block teaching", or "ward teaching" when performed by male priesthood holders and "visiting teaching," when performed by female members of the church's Relief Society. The previous dual home- and visiting-teaching programs were designed to allow families to be provided spiritual instruction in their own homes in addition to weekly church services. The present joint program deemphasizes teaching, replacing it with prayerful consideration given to the needs of one's assigned congregants, finding ways to serve and engage in fellowship with them.

In areas with few church members, the local units are called branches rather than wards. The ministering program operates within these branches in a like manner to the wards.

== History ==
=== Home Teaching and Visiting Teaching programs ===
Home teaching had been introduced to the church by Harold B. Lee, as part of the priesthood correlation effort. The program took effect on January 1, 1964. It replaced the ward teachers, who had previously had similar responsibilities.

The mandate of the correlation committee was to simplify the curriculum of the church, but Lee used it to implement wider changes. Just three days before Lee made his general conference address announcing the home teaching program, Henry D. Moyle objected to the change during a first presidency meeting on the grounds that the correlation committee was overstepping its bounds and taking responsibility away from the presiding bishop who supervised the ward teaching program. Even though Church President David O. McKay probably agreed with Moyle on this issue, he did not intercede to stop Lee.

In May 1963, a home teaching committee was formed with the purpose of visiting stakes and promoting the home teaching program. The committee was chaired by Marion G. Romney. Thomas S. Monson was asked to be a member of the committee five months before his call as an apostle.

=== Ministering program ===
During the church's April 2018 general conference, church president Russell M. Nelson announced the retirement of home teaching and visiting teaching and its replacement with "a newer, holier approach" called ministering.

== Ministering assignments and responsibilities ==
A ward's elders quorum's leadership assigns priesthood-holding companionships to entire household families to be served. Often youth, who are members of the teachers or priests quorums, are assigned as a junior companion to a member of the elders quorum.

The ward Relief Society leadership also assigns its members to companionships. These companionships, which may include youth from the ward's Young Women organization as junior companions, serve the needs of women and young women members of a family assigned them.

Sometimes the quorum and Relief Society leaders collaborate in order to create a companionship which consists of a Melchizedek priesthood holder and his wife. All assignments are approved by the bishop or the branch president.

With the approval of a mission president, full-time missionaries of the LDS Church may assist church members with these visits.

== See also ==
- Bishop's storehouse
- LDS Humanitarian Services
- Priesthood blessing
