= Children's Songbook =

- Language: English
- Publisher: The Church of Jesus Christ of Latter-day Saints
- Publication date: 1989
- Publication place: United States
- Pages: 314
- ISBN: 0875798632

The Children's Songbook of The Church of Jesus Christ of Latter-day Saints is the official songbook for children in the Church of Jesus Christ of Latter-day Saints (LDS Church). It was first published in English in 1989. These songs are for the Primary, which is an organization in the LDS Church for children between the ages of 18 months and 12 years old, who learn about the teachings of Jesus Christ.

The Children's Songbook replaced Sing with Me, which was published in 1969. The songs in the Songbook help young children learn to live righteously and keep God's commandments. The book is simplified in comparison to the LDS Hymn Book. The songs are designed to be easy for children to learn.

The contents are divided so that different sections refer to various gospel topics for children. Some of the topics include prayer, reverence, gratitude, Jesus' mission, the importance of family and the home, love for God, the good feelings you can get when you live righteously, as well as a few activity songs and some songs on the beauty of nature. There is also some prelude music for playing before Sacrament meetings or in the home.

Although the songs are intended primarily for children, adults in the LDS Church also utilize songs in the book for other purposes. The Tabernacle Choir at Temple Square has sung several of these songs from time to time in their weekly Sunday broadcast of Music and the Spoken Word. Some of the songs that appear in the Songbook also appear in the church's hymnal. Most songs that appear in either book can be sung in sacrament meeting as part of a musical program or musical number after the sacrament is delivered. There are some songs that also have been written for use in sacrament meeting that don't appear in either book, but are approved for use.

One of the songs has American Sign Language (ASL) pictures that teaches how to use sign language for the words of the song. Additionally, the LDS Church's website contains ASL videos for about 45 songs from the Children's Songbook. There are 268 songs in the songbook.

A few new Primary songs have been adopted by the LDS Church since Children's Songbook was published. Children in Primary sing the new songs, but a revised Songbook has not been published. Two new songs have been written in 2008 and 2009. Their lyrics reinforce the roles that fathers and mothers play, and teaches that children can also contribute to the family and grow up and become fathers and mothers.

On June 18, 2018, the church announced revisions the hymnbook and the Children's Songbook in an effort to reflect the needs of church members around the world. The new children’s songbook will offer the same hymns and songs in all languages.

== See also ==
- Janice Kapp Perry
