= The Juvenile Instructor =

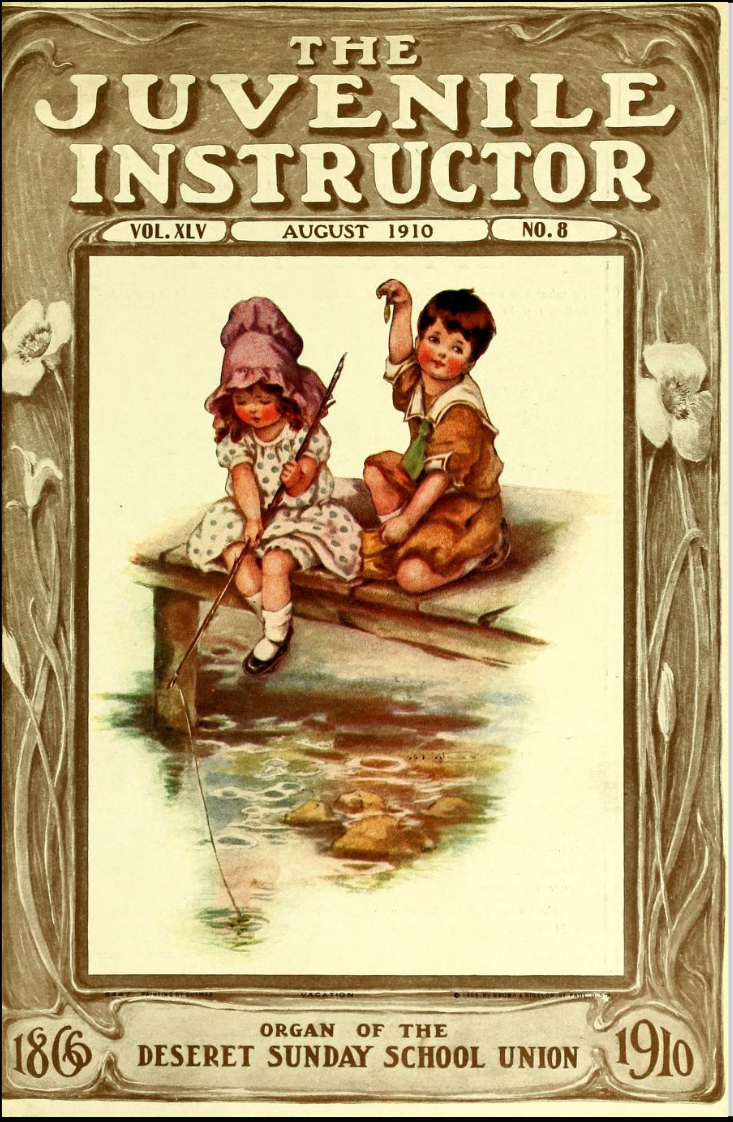
Cover of the August 1910 Juvenile Instructor

The Juvenile Instructor was a magazine for members of the Church of Jesus Christ of Latter-day Saints (LDS Church). It began publication in 1866 as a private publication, but by the late 1860s served as the de facto publication of the LDS Church's Deseret Sunday School Union organization. It was an official periodical of the LDS Church from 1901 to 1929, after which the church replaced it with The Instructor.

== History ==
The Juvenile Instructor was issued monthly and was initially targeted toward the children and youth members of the LDS Church. It consisted of catechisms on the Bible, Book of Mormon, and Doctrine and Covenants; musical compositions; illustrations; stories; editorial teachings; and other aids to gospel instruction. It was the first magazine for children published in the United States west of the Mississippi River.

For much of its history, The Juvenile Instructor was owned by the Cannon family. Its first editor was George Q. Cannon, an LDS Church apostle. Cannon and his family continued to publish the magazine privately until January 1, 1901, when the Deseret Sunday School Union purchased the magazine and continued its publication. From 1901 to 1929, the magazine was considered the official publication of the church's Sunday School.

From 1881 to 1890, George Reynolds was an assistant editor of The Juvenile Instructor. In 1882, he wrote a series of popular articles in the magazine about Joseph Smith and the translation of the Book of Mormon.

== See also ==
- List of Latter Day Saint periodicals
