= Improvement Era =

Official magazine of the LDS Church

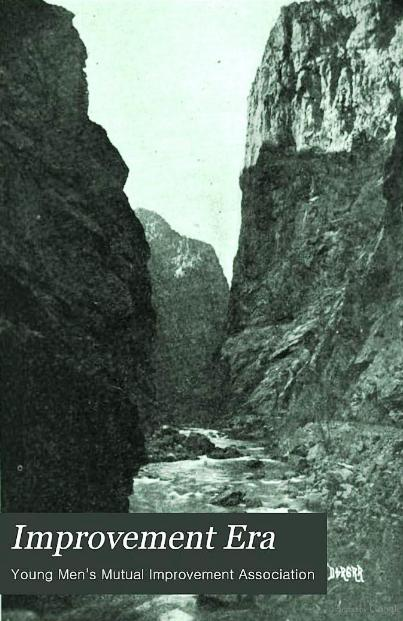
- A scan of the April 1966 cover of the Improvement Era, volume 12
- Frequency: Monthly
- Publisher: The Church of Jesus Christ of Latter-day Saints
- Founded: 1897
- Final issue: December 1970
- Country: United States
- Language: English

The Improvement Era (often shortened to The Era) was an official magazine of the Church of Jesus Christ of Latter-day Saints (LDS Church) between 1897 and 1970.

== History ==
The Improvement Era was first published in 1897 as a replacement to the unofficial magazine, The Contributor. Over the years, it was the official publishing organ for a variety of organizations within the Church of Jesus Christ of Latter-day Saints, including the Seventies, the Young Men's Mutual Improvement Association, the Young Ladies' Mutual Improvement Association, priesthood quorums, church schools, the Church Music Committee, and the Home Teaching Committee. In the July 1960 issue, an insert targeted toward the teenagers of the church was included. Entitled "The Era of Youth," it continued to be included in the Improvement Era until 1970, when it became the basis for the New Era.

With the implementation of the Priesthood Correlation Program in 1970, the Improvement Era ceased publication and was replaced by the New Era and the Ensign.

Editors of the Improvement Era included Joseph F. Smith, Heber J. Grant, George Albert Smith, David O. McKay, Joseph Fielding Smith, John A. Widtsoe, Richard L. Evans, B. H. Roberts, Edward H. Anderson, Hugh J. Cannon, Harrison R. Merrill, and Doyle L. Green.

== Notable articles ==
The February 1968 issue included the first publication of images of the Joseph Smith Papyri, in sepia tone.

== See also ==
- Elaine A. Cannon
- Ardyth Kennelly
- Young Woman's Journal
- List of Latter Day Saint periodicals
