= William W. Parmley =

American cardiologist and LDS leader (1936–2026)

Second Quorum of the Seventy
- April 5, 2003 – October 3, 2009
- Called by: Gordon B. Hinckley
- End reason: Honorably released

Personal details
- Born: William Watts Parmley; January 22, 1936; Salt Lake City, Utah, U.S.
- Died: May 23, 2026 (aged 90)

William Watts Parmley (January 22, 1936 – May 23, 2026) was an American general authority of the Church of Jesus Christ of Latter-day Saints (LDS Church) from 2003 to 2009. Prior to becoming a general authority, Parmley had served as the chief of cardiology at the University of California, San Francisco and did studies primarily relating to cardiovascular pharmacology.

== Early life and education ==
Parmley was born in Salt Lake City, Utah, on January 22, 1936, to Thomas J. Parmley and his wife, LaVern W. Parmley. From 1957 to 1958 he served as an LDS missionary in the Northwestern States Mission based in Portland, Oregon. Parmley received a bachelor's degree in physics from Harvard University, an M.D. from Johns Hopkins Medical School, and internal medicine training from Johns Hopkins Medical School and Peter Bent Brigham Hospital.

== Career ==
Parmley was involved in several studies involving heart muscle issues. He wrote the 1996 text entitled Cardiology. He also served as the editor-in-chief of the Journal of the American College of Cardiology and as president of the American College of Cardiology. Parmley also co-authored with Stanton Glantz several papers on the health effects of passive smoking that were covered by the news media. He retired from the University of California, San Francisco in 2003, after which he became active in a campaign to eradicate measles.

He became a member of the LDS Church's Second Quorum of the Seventy in April 2003. Prior to his call as a general authority, Parmley served previously in the church as a bishop, stake president, and area seventy. As a general authority, Parmley served in the presidency of the church's Africa Southeast Area.

From 2009 to 2012, Parmley was president of the Sacramento California Temple.

== Personal life and death ==
Parmley was married to Shanna Lee Nielsen and they were the parents of four children. He died on May 23, 2026, at the age of 90.
