= Thomas J. Parmley =

American physicist (1897-1997)

- Born: November 2, 1897; Scofield, Utah, U. S.
- Died: September 15, 1997 (aged 99); Salt Lake City, Utah, U. S.
- Education: University of Utah; Cornell University
- Occupations: Physicist, professor
- Spouse: LaVern Watts (m. 1923; died 1980)
- Children: 3, including William

Thomas Jennison Parmley (November 2, 1897 – September 15, 1997) was an American physics professor at the University of Utah and chairman of the physics department from 1957 to 1963.

== Biography ==
Parmley was born in Scofield, Utah to William and Mary Veal Parmley. His father was killed in the Scofield Mine disaster in that town in 1900. In 1921, he received his bachelor's degree from the University of Utah where he was a founding member of the Sigma Pi fraternity chapter. While still being an undergraduate, he worked as a chemist for the U.S. Smeltering Company. In 1923 he married LaVern W. Parmley who served as general president of the Primary of the Church of Jesus Christ of Latter-day Saints (LDS Church). He then earned his Ph.D. from Cornell University in 1927. Prior to joining the faculty of the University of Utah, Parmley was involved in cyclotron research at the University of California, Berkeley. While there he was the lead author of the paper The Radioactives of some high-mass isotopes of Cobalt.

Parmley was involved with the Atomic Energy Commission and the National Bureau of Standards. He was a member of the American Institute of Physics.

One of the main physics lecture halls at the University of Utah is named after him as is a scholarship.

In 1996 he was named the university's Centennial Professor.

Parmley's son William was a cardiologist and a leader in the LDS Church.
