= Priesthood Correlation Program =

In the Church of Jesus Christ of Latter-day Saints (LDS Church), the Priesthood Correlation Program (also called the Correlation Program or simply Correlation) began in 1908 as a program to reform the instruction manuals and curriculum of the different organizations of the church. Its scope quickly widened, and Correlation came to affect almost every aspect of the church, including doctrines, organizations, finances, and ordinances. A significant consequence was to centralize decision-making power in the priesthood, particularly the Quorum of the Twelve Apostles. More recently, the function of the correlation department has shifted to planning and approving church publications and curriculum, and keeping unorthodox information, doctrines, and other undesired concepts from being introduced or revived.

== Background and history ==
In the LDS Church, all organizations and activities are intended to complement the church's mission and are considered subject to the priesthood, helping to complete its responsibilities.

Before the correlation movement, the church's various organizations and programs, including the Relief Society, Primary, Sunday School, welfare program, genealogy programs, and the Young Men and Young Women organizations, were largely under the direction of the stake or ward, and curriculum could vary from ward to ward. Formal organization of a Correlation Committee occurred in 1908. Starting in 1944, the Church Publications Committee approved the content and wording of the lesson materials from each of the auxiliaries, ensuring that everything published conformed to official church doctrine.

By the early 1960s, the rapid growth of the church had created administrative difficulties that needed to be addressed. Marion G. Romney gave an example of a 14-year-old boy who was invited to four swimming parties in the same week, each organized by an independent church organization. David O. McKay charged the General Priesthood Committee, led by Harold B. Lee, to form committees "to correlate the instruction and curriculum of all priesthood and auxiliary organizations of the church." Under Lee, correlation quickly took on a much wider scope than just the church curriculum. For example, to bring priesthood correlation to the local level, Priesthood Home Teaching was introduced, replacing the role formerly occupied by ward teachers. Family Home Evening was also introduced. Other innovations included the calling of regional representatives, a uniform annual report from each ward starting in 1967, and further centralization and standardization of tithing in 1970. The Sunday School underwent a reorganization as well.

The changes made by Lee brought the auxiliary organizations more directly under the control of the Quorum of the Twelve Apostles. Privately, McKay had concerns about the overreach of church correlation, referring to it as the "Super Priesthood Committee". McKay's counselors, Hugh B. Brown and N. Eldon Tanner, were worried about the correlation committee taking decision-making power away from the church's First Presidency. However, no action was taken by McKay to change the way that Lee was running correlation.

In 1970, the process of correlation resulted in the discontinuation of the Relief Society Magazine and the Improvement Era in favor of the correlated Ensign magazine for adults and the New Era for youth. The Millennial Star, a publication for British members, and The Instructor, a Sunday School publication, were also discontinued at this time.

The present Priesthood Correlation Department was created by the direction of the First Presidency in 1972 and originally named the Internal Communications Department.

== Doctrines and structure ==
Between the 1920s and early 1960s, there was an increase in printed material available to LDS Church members, much of which contained opinions or quotes of church leaders that contradicted the evolving official positions and doctrines of the church. Additionally, historical documents surfaced, were made available, or printed from early members' diaries, which did not support the official church history. To counter this, the Correlation Committee, under the direction of the First Presidency, began to print materials and other curriculum to clarify and standardize what the church hierarchy considered to be official doctrine and history.

Another result is the block program, which standardized Sunday as the official day to hold most public church meetings. Prior to the 1980s, meetings were held throughout the week. For example, in a local ward, the Relief Society may have met on Monday mornings, Primary and choir practice on Tuesday, Young Women and Young Men on Thursday, ward activities and events on Friday, and service projects on Saturday. Because of the church's focus on families, the Correlation Committee recommended a three-hour block of meetings on Sunday that would include a sacrament meeting, Sunday School, priesthood and Relief Society meetings, and Primary, Young Men, and Young Women classes. This would allow families to spend more time together and for parents and children to be more involved with their communities.

Additionally, due to a more centralized structure, local building funds and ward budgets were centralized by the church, easing the contributions of local members for such funds and allowing for a more equitable distribution of funds. Before this, church areas with more wealthy members tended to have better-funded buildings and activities than poorer areas.

== Results and curriculum ==
Because of the correlation program, the church generally operates the same in structure, practice, and doctrine globally. For example, members in Germany, Kenya, and Utah all generally study the same lessons and attend the same type of meetings in any given week. According to Carlos E. Asay, who served as an executive director of the Church Curriculum Department, employees use planning charts to ensure that important gospel topics are properly covered and taught at regular intervals.

Currently, there are two curriculum tracks for members: one for areas where the church is fully established in wards and stakes, and another for areas where the church is growing and smaller in number. The doctrines taught are the same; however, the emphasis on principles, church structure, and church culture is more emphasized in fledgling areas, while emphasis in established areas focuses more on the application of the principles taught.

== See also ==
- History of the Church of Jesus Christ of Latter-day Saints
- Strengthening Church Members Committee
- Women and the Church of Jesus Christ of Latter-day Saints
