= David F. Boone =

American historian

David F. Boone is an American professor of Church History and Doctrine at Brigham Young University (BYU). He largely specializes in the history of the Church of Jesus Christ of Latter-day Saints (LDS Church) in the Southern and Southwestern United States.

== Biography ==
Boone was born in Jacksonville, Florida. He also grew up there as a member of the LDS Church. He was a Mormon missionary in Southern California, and then went to study at BYU. He received his M.A. in western American history in 1981 and his Doctorate in Educational Leadership, with emphasis in LDS Church education.

Boone is married to the former Mary Farnsworth, and they have eight children.

== Publications ==
Among other writings Boone has written on Zion's Camp. He was also a major contributor to the Encyclopedia of Latter-day Saint History. He has also written an article on the LDS Church in Britain during World War II.

== Sources ==
- BYU faculty page
