= The Friend (LDS magazine) =

American LDS Church children's magazine

- The Friend in March 2007
- Editor: Randy D. Funk
- Frequency: Monthly
- Publisher: The Church of Jesus Christ of Latter-day Saints
- First issue: The Children's Friend: 1902; The Friend: January 1971
- Country: United States
- Language: English
- ISSN: 0009-4102

The Friend, formerly titled The Children's Friend, is a monthly children's magazine published by the Church of Jesus Christ of Latter-day Saints (LDS Church). It is aimed at those of Primary age, approximately ages 3 through 11. It includes messages from church leaders, stories, crafts, recipes, and artwork and poetry submitted by readers.

== History ==
=== Origin ===
Some have traced the precedent for The Friend to George Q. Cannon's establishment of The Juvenile Instructor as a "first-class child's paper" in January 1866. Over time though this periodical shifted to being under the organization of the Deseret Sunday School Union and became more aimed at teachers than children.

The church's Primary organization was formed in 1878. In 1890, the Free Public School Act was passed by the Utah Territorial, establishing schools in the territory. Funded by taxpayers, LDS Church doctrine could not be taught in the public schools, which concerned the Primary General President, Louie B. Felt, who said, "If there was a time when it was important to attend to the spiritual education of our children, it is now when so many of our little ones attend the district school, where religion is forbidden to be taught." May Anderson, secretary to the Primary General Presidency, first suggested the idea for a periodical for children in 1893. The Children's Friend was ultimately under control of the Primary organization.

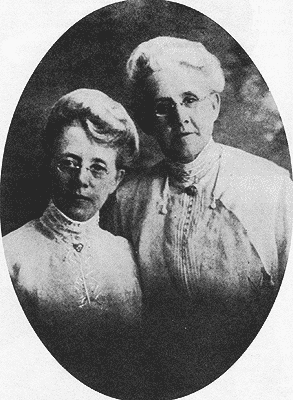
Louie Felt (right), offered her home as collateral for the printing of The Children's Friend, and her companion May Anderson (left), was the magazine's first editor.

=== The Children's Friend ===
By 1896, the Primary General Presidency began lobbying for its own publication, making several appeals to the First Presidency, but were denied because, "it was too great an undertaking." In 1899, the Primary general board published The Primary Helper, a booklet that sold for 15 cents, but it was unsuccessful and only ran for one volume. In 1901, the First Presidency approved publishing a magazine they called The Children's Friend, with the stipulation that the LDS Church would not provide any financial assistance, and if it failed the church would not pay the debts.

The men in the printing office discouraged Felt and Anderson from printing the magazine, one of them stating, "Don't do it. Don't do it. Magazines run by women always fail. Take my advice and drop the idea." In November 1901, an office building was secured and Anderson became the first editor. Felt put up her home as collateral, and May Anderson quit her job to work full time on Primary. The magazine was first published in January 1902, and was financially stable. In the first issue, Felt wrote, "With feelings of intense joy, deep devotion and profound gratitude we introduce this little book. Hope and fear alternately plead for supremacy and we humbly ask that you will exercise charity and assist us by your faith and prayers."

The initial print run was 2,000, with it increased to 4,000 the following year. By 1906, after improvements to the magazine and sales representatives created in each ward, circulation increased to 20,000. In 1924, the magazine changed to a larger size, with two colors in the cover, and included picture and serial stories. In the 1940s, center pages featured cut-out crafts for children, and lessons for children were eliminated. By 1970, circulation was at 170,000. The Primary General President often doubled as editor of The Children's Friend.

=== The Friend ===
The Children's Friend changed its title to The Friend at the end of 1970. The Friend has been published since January 1971. The First Presidency and Quorum of the Twelve Apostles of the LDS Church began to oversee the magazine that year. Contents included "illustrated stories, quotes and messages from church general authorities, recipes, games, activities, suggestions for Family Home Evening, gospel art, and so on." This change also made The Friend an official vehicle for communication of the church to its members.

Gordon B. Hinckley, then a member of the Quorum of the Twelve, explained in an article in the December Improvement Era some of the reasoning behind the name change. He wrote, "The name of the magazine will ... simply be the Friend, dropping the word Children's, because when some youngsters get to be ten and eleven years of age, they think they are no longer children. But they still need a Friend".

In 2012, the magazine's contents were described by the Deseret News: "The Friend magazine has incorporated scriptures throughout the magazine. Each article is based on a scripture, includes different stories about Jesus and a poster is found each month titled 'Bright Ideas' that has an easy scripture for children to memorize." The Salt Lake Tribune criticized a 2013 article about the mothers of LDS Church presidents published in The Friend for not including the names of the mothers. In 2015, its circulation was estimated to be 275,000. That same year, the magazine ran an initiative where children sent in paper cutouts of their hands with an act of service they performed written on them; over 30,000 of these "helping hands" were received from children worldwide.

In 2016, the magazine's article "Savannah the Engineer," about a young girl who enters a battery-powered-car-designing contest, was viewed by one LDS feminist as one of several instances of increasing gender equality in LDS Church-affiliated organizations.

As part of a panel at the UNICEF Humanitarian Action for Children in December 2019, Joy D. Jones mentioned that The Friend would publish articles for children about "safe health practice, including hand washing, mosquito nets, removal of standing water, immunizations, exercise, and nutrition" the following year. In August 2020, the church announced that beginning in January 2021, The Friend would change from being published only in English to being published in a total of 23 languages every month, with another 24 language editions published bimonthly.

== Editors ==
=== Editors of The Children's Friend ===
- May Anderson (1902–40)
- May Green Hinckley (1940–43)
- Adele C. Howells (1943–51)
- LaVern W. Parmley (1951–70)

=== Editors of The Friend ===
Since 1977, the editor of The Friend has been a general authority of the LDS Church.

- Doyle L. Green (1971–75)
- Dean L. Larsen (1977–78)
- James E. Faust (1979)
- M. Russell Ballard (1980–84)
- Carlos E. Asay (1985–86)
- Hugh W. Pinnock (1987–89)
- Rex D. Pinegar (1994)
- Joe J. Christensen (1994–95)
- Jack H. Goaslind (1996–98)
- Marlin K. Jensen (1999–2000)
- Dennis B. Neuenschwander (2001–04)
- Jay E. Jensen (2005–08)
- Spencer J. Condie (2008–10)
- Paul B. Pieper (2010–12)
- Craig A. Cardon (2012–15)
- Joseph W. Sitati (2015–17)
- Hugo E. Martinez (2017–18)
- Randy D. Funk (2018–22)
- Randall K. Bennett (2022- )

== See also ==
- List of Latter Day Saint periodicals
