= Dean L. Larsen =

Mormon leader

First Quorum of the Seventy
- October 1, 1976 – October 4, 1997
- Called by: Spencer W. Kimball
- End reason: Designated as an emeritus general authority

Presidency of the Seventy
- February 22, 1980 – August 15, 1993
- Called by: Spencer W. Kimball
- End reason: Honorably released

Emeritus General Authority
- October 4, 1997 – October 28, 2019
- Called by: Gordon B. Hinckley

Personal details
- Born: Dean LeRoy Larsen; May 24, 1927; Hyrum, Utah, United States
- Died: October 28, 2019 (aged 92); Provo, Utah, United States

Dean LeRoy Larsen (May 24, 1927 – October 28, 2019) was a general authority of the Church of Jesus Christ of Latter-day Saints (LDS Church) from 1976 until his death. He was the eighteenth Church Historian and Recorder from 1985 to 1997.

Larsen was born in Hyrum, Utah. After briefly serving in the United States Navy at the end of the Second World War, Larson attended the University of Utah and Utah State University, graduating from Utah State with a degree in English and Spanish.

In 1962, Larsen was appointed the secretary of the LDS Church Indian Committee. He taught for one year at the Institute of Religion at the University of Utah and then was asked to become president of the church's Texas South Mission. Upon completing this three-year assignment, Larsen taught at the Institute of Religion in Ogden, Utah. In the LDS Church, Larsen has served as a bishop and regional representative. In 1976, Larsen became the editor of all church magazines.

Later in 1976, he became a general authority and member of the First Quorum of the Seventy, where he served until being designated an emeritus general authority in 1997. From 1980 to 1993, Larsen was a member of the Presidency of the Seventy; he was the senior member of the presidency from 1986 to 1993. He also served a term as Church Historian and Recorder, succeeding G. Homer Durham. After he was released in 1997, the office of Church Historian remained vacant until Marlin K. Jensen was called in 2005.

From 1998 to 2001, Larsen was the president of the church's Provo Utah Temple.

Larsen married Geneal Johnson and they became the parents of six children. Larsen died at his home in Provo, Utah on October 28, 2019, at age 92.

== See also ==
- "Elder Dean L. Larsen of the First Quorum of Seventy," Ensign, November 1976, pp. 136–37
