= Jay E. Jensen =

American Mormon leader (born 1942)

Presidency of the Seventy
- August 1, 2008 – August 1, 2012
- Called by: Thomas S. Monson
- End reason: Honorably released

First Quorum of the Seventy
- April 1, 1995 – October 6, 2012
- Called by: Gordon B. Hinckley
- End reason: Granted emeritus status

Second Quorum of the Seventy
- June 6, 1992 – April 1, 1995
- Called by: Ezra Taft Benson
- End reason: Transferred to First Quorum of the Seventy

Emeritus General Authority
- October 6, 2012
- Called by: Thomas S. Monson

Personal details
- Born: Jay Edwin Jensen; February 5, 1942 (age 83); Payson, Utah, United States
- Spouse(s): Lona Lee Child
- Children: 6

Jay Edwin Jensen (born February 5, 1942) has been a general authority of the Church of Jesus Christ of Latter-day Saints (LDS Church) since 1992. He served as a member of the church's Presidency of the Seventy from 2008 to 2012. Jensen was designated an emeritus general authority in the October 2012 general conference.

== Biography ==
Jensen was born in Payson, Utah, and raised in Mapleton, Utah. From 1961 to 1963, Jensen served as an LDS Church missionary in the Spanish-American Mission, concentrating on teaching the gospel to Spanish-speakers in the southwestern United States. On the November 1, 1963, Jensen married Lona Lee Child in the Manti Temple and they are the parents of six children.

Jensen graduated with bachelor's degree in Spanish and History, a master's degree in LDS Church History and Doctrine, and a doctoral degrees in Education, all from Brigham Young University (BYU).

Jensen spent his professional career as a full-time LDS Church employee. He was the director of scripture coordination for the church's Curriculum Department at the time of his call as a general authority. He previously worked for the Church Educational System as a seminary teacher and director of curriculum. Jensen was also the director of training for the church's Missionary Department for a period of time.

Jensen has served in the LDS Church as a bishop, branch president, counselor in the Missionary Training Center presidency, and as president of the church's Colombia Cali Mission from 1975 to 1978.

Jensen was called to the Second Quorum of the Seventy in 1992 and transferred to the First Quorum of the Seventy in 1995. As a general authority, he has served in a number of area presidencies in Central and South America, as well as geographical areas covering parts of the United States and Canada. In 2004, Jensen and Lynn A. Mickelsen, also of the Seventy, were appointed to supervise the formation and publication of a Spanish-language LDS edition of the Bible. Jensen became a member of the Presidency of the Seventy on August 1, 2008. In 2011, Jensen spoke at BYU to Evergreen International, "a same-sex voice of faithful LDS members," and spoke on finding peace by focusing on Jesus Christ.

Jensen was released from the Presidency of the Seventy on August 1, 2012, and designated as an emeritus general authority during that October's general conference. From 2013 to 2016 Jensen served as president of the church's Cochabamba Bolivia Temple.

== See also ==
- "Elder Jay E. Jensen Of the Seventy," Ensign, August 1992, p. 78
- Julie A. Dockstader, "Spiritual foundation set early in life", Church News, August 8, 1992
