= Josephine Richards West =

American suffragist

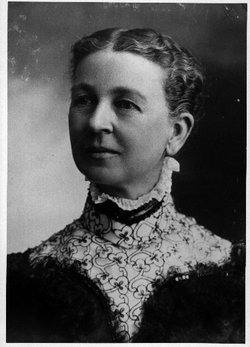

Second Counselor in the general presidency of the Primary
- 1895 – 1905
- Called by: Louie B. Felt
- Predecessor: Clara C. M. Cannon
- Successor: Clara W. Beebe

Personal details
- Born: Josephine Richards; May 25, 1853; Salt Lake City, Utah Territory, United States
- Died: April 23, 1933 (aged 79); Logan, Utah, United States
- Cause of death: pneumonia
- Resting place: Ogden City Cemetery; 41.233°N 111.962°W
- Spouse(s): Joseph A. West
- Children: 7, including Franklin L. West
- Parents: Franklin D. Richards; Jane Snyder

Josephine Richards West (May 25, 1853 – April 23, 1933) was a leader in the Church of Jesus Christ of Latter-day Saints (LDS Church) and was a suffragist from Utah Territory.

Josephine Richards was born in Salt Lake City, Utah Territory, to Franklin D. Richards and Jane Snyder. In 1873 she married Joseph A. West; they resided in Ogden, Utah.

Richards was a member of the general board of the Primary Association of the LDS Church from 1893 until her death. In 1896, she succeeded Clara C. M. Cannon as second counselor to Louie B. Felt in the general presidency of the Primary. West served in this capacity until 1905, when she was succeeded by Clara W. Beebe.

West was a suffragist and twice served as a delegate from Utah Territory to women's suffrage conferences in Washington, D.C.

West was the mother of Franklin L. West, a leader and educator in the LDS Church.

West died of pneumonia at Logan, Utah and is buried in the Ogden City Cemetery.

The Church of Jesus Christ of Latter-day Saints titles
| Preceded by Clara C. M. Cannon | Second Counselor in the general presidency of the Primary; 1896 – 1905 | Succeeded by Clara W. Beebe |
