= Frederick J. Pack =

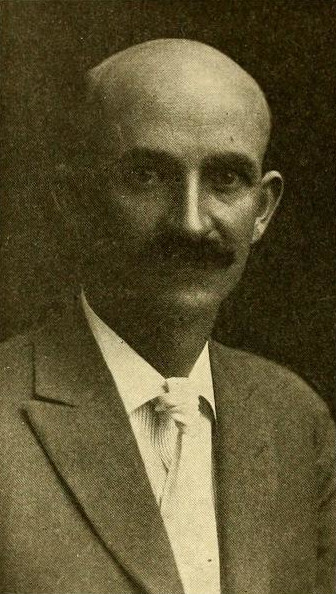
- Born: February 2, 1875; Bountiful, Utah
- Died: December 2, 1938 (aged 63); Salt Lake City, Utah
- Known for: University of Utah geology professor, Sunday School leader in the LDS Church

Frederick James Pack (February 2, 1875 – December 2, 1938) was a professor of geology at the University of Utah and Brigham Young College and a writer on the deleterious effects of tobacco on human health. Pack was also a leader in the Church of Jesus Christ of Latter-day Saints (LDS Church), serving as the chairman of the Gospel Doctrine Committee of the church.

== Early life ==
Pack was born at Bountiful, Utah Territory, to John Pack (who had first come to Utah in 1847 in Brigham Young's advance company) and Mary Jane Walker. Early on he attended LDS College in Salt Lake City.

== Professional life ==
Pack attended the University of Utah, where he obtained a degree in mining engineering in 1904. By 1906, he had completed masters and Ph.D. degrees in geology at Columbia University in New York City. In 1906 and 1907, he was a professor of geology and mineralogy at Brigham Young College in Logan. In 1907, he became the Deseret Professor of Geology at the University of Utah, a position he held until his death.

In 1918, Pack published Tobacco and Human Efficiency, which has been described as the most "comprehensive or conscientious summation of the case to discourage cigarette use" that had been produced by that date. However, Pack's work on tobacco has been criticized as being tainted with "suppositions" and "moral bias" arising from his status as a Latter-day Saint who believed that avoiding tobacco was a commandment from God.

In his later professional life, Pack created a travel company called Utah Intelligence Tours, which specialized in tours of areas in Utah and the Western United States that are of particular geological or paleontological interest.

Pack's personal and professional papers are held by the J. Willard Marriott Library at the University of Utah in Salt Lake City.

== Church life ==
Pack was a devout member of the LDS Church. In 1892, he became an elder of the church. In 1896, apostle Francis M. Lyman ordained him a seventy and in 1897 apostle John W. Taylor ordained him a high priest. Pack and his wife Sadie served as LDS Church missionaries in the Colorado Mission of the church in 1896 to 1898. While on this mission, Pack presided over the Pueblo Conference and later the Colorado Springs Conference.

From 1911 to 1916 Pack was the Sunday School Superintendent in the Liberty Stake in Salt Lake City. From 1920 to 1930 he was a member of the high council in the same stake. In 1920, Pack became a member of the Deseret Sunday School Union General Board.

In 1932, Pack delivered a series of 28 weekly radio lectures entitled, "The Breadth of Mormonism".

During the last years of his life, Pack was the chair of the Gospel Doctrine Committee of the LDS Church. He was a frequent contributor to church magazines, with many of his writings focusing on the scientific justifications for the Word of Wisdom.

=== Coca-cola and the Word of Wisdom ===
In 1918, Pack published an article in the church's Improvement Era entitled "Should Latter-Day Saints Drink Coca-Cola?" In the article, Pack reasoned that because Coca-Cola contained caffeine, which is also present in tea and coffee, Latter-day Saints should abstain from Coca-Cola in the same way that they abstain from tea and coffee. Since this time, some Latter-day Saints have believed that drinking Coca-Cola or other caffeinated beverages amounts to a violation of the Word of Wisdom.

== Family ==
Pack married Sadie Grant on November 25, 1896. Sadie Grant Pack was the first counselor to May Anderson in the general presidency of the Primary from 1925 to 1929. The Packs were the parents of four children. His brother Ward E. Pack served in the Utah Territory Legislature.

== Publications ==
=== Books ===
- Frederick J. Pack (1927). Intelligence tours Through Utah's Geological Wonders (Salt Lake City: Intelligence Tours, Inc.)
- —— (1924). Science and Belief in God: A Discussion of Certain Phases of Science and their Bearing upon Belief in the Supreme Being (Salt Lake City: Deseret News) (republished in 2007 by Kessinger Publishing, ISBN 1-4325-6857-4)
- —— (1918). Tobacco and Human Efficiency (Salt Lake City: Deseret News)

=== Periodical articles (incomplete) ===
- Frederick J. Pack, "The Breaking of Law—An Instance", Improvement Era 18:2 (Dec. 1914)
- ——, "The Creation of the Earth: Part I", Improvement Era 13:11 (Sep. 1910)
- ——, "The Creation of the Earth: Part II", Improvement Era 14:3 (Jan. 1911)
- —— and George D. Pyper, "Did Lehi Land in Chile", The Instructor 73:4 (1938) p. 160
- ——, "How the Impending Tobacco Crusade Can be Avoided", Improvement Era 24:3 (Jan. 1921)
- ——, "The Modern Denial of Jesus Christ", Improvement Era 29:5 (Mar. 1926)
- ——, "An Offshoot of the Spalding Argument", Improvement Era 16:8 (May 1913)
- ——, "An Open Question to Dr. Spalding", Improvement Era 16:7 (May 1913)
- ——, "Should Latter-Day Saints Drink Coca-Cola?", Improvement Era 21:5 (Mar. 1918)
- ——, "The Spalding Argument", Improvement Era 16:4 (Feb. 1913)
