= Clara C. M. Cannon =

American Mormon pioneer (1839–1926)

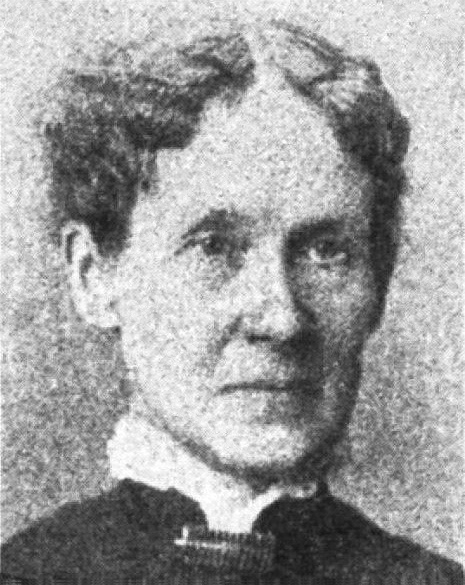

Second Counselor in the general presidency of the Primary
- June 19, 1880 – 1895
- Called by: Louie B. Felt
- Successor: Josephine R. West

Personal details
- Born: Clara Moses; April 21, 1839; Westfield, Massachusetts, United States
- Died: August 21, 1926 (aged 87); Centerville, Utah, United States
- Cause of death: Esophageal cancer
- Resting place: Salt Lake City Cemetery; 40.777°N 111.858°W
- Spouse(s): William H. Mason; Angus M. Cannon
- Children: 5 (2 with Mason, 3 with Cannon)
- Parents: Ambrose T. Moses; Lydia Ensign

Clarissa Cordelia ("Clara") Moses Cannon (April 21, 1839 – August 21, 1926) was a Mormon pioneer and a member of the first-ever general presidency of the Primary organization of the Church of Jesus Christ of Latter-day Saints (LDS Church). She was the second counselor to general president Louie B. Felt from 1880 to 1895.

Clara Moses was born in Westfield, Massachusetts. In 1846 she took the six-month journey on the ship Brooklyn from New York City to San Francisco via Cape Horn and the Sandwich Islands. Instead of traveling on to Utah Territory, she settled in San Francisco. In 1859, she married William H. Mason; they had two children. William Mason died in 1868.

Clara moved to Salt Lake City and in 1875 she became a plural wife of Angus M. Cannon, who would later be prosecuted for unlawful cohabitation under the Edmunds Act; the case of Cannon v. United States eventually went to the United States Supreme Court. Clara and Angus Cannon had three children together. Prior to her service in the general Primary presidency, Clara Cannon was a counselor in the presidencies of the Primary and Relief Society in the Salt Lake Stake of the LDS Church. When Louie B. Felt became the first general presidency of the Primary, Matilda M. Barratt and Cannon were selected as Felt's counselors. Cannon was a counselor until 1895; the next year she was succeeded in the position by Josephine R. West.

== Death ==
Clara Moses Cannon died of throat cancer in Centerville, Utah, aged 87 and was interred in Salt Lake City Cemetery.

== Notes ==
The Church of Jesus Christ of Latter-day Saints titles
First	Second Counselor in the general presidency of the Primary; 1880 — 1895	Succeeded by Josephine R. West
