= Lillie T. Freeze =

American Mormon leader (1855–1937)

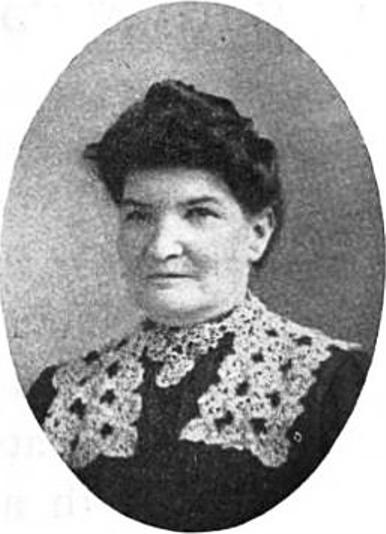

First Counselor in the general presidency of the Primary
- 1888 – 1905
- Called by: Louie B. Felt
- Predecessor: Matilda M. Barratt
- Successor: May Anderson

Personal details
- Born: Lelia Tuckett; March 26, 1855; Salt Lake City, Utah Territory, United States
- Died: March 23, 1937 (aged 81); Salt Lake City, Utah, United States
- Resting place: Salt Lake City Cemetery; 40.777°N 111.858°W
- Alma mater: Morgan Commercial College
- Spouse(s): James P. Freeze
- Children: 4
- Parents: Henry Tuckett; Mercy Westwood

Lelia ("Lillie") Tuckett Freeze (March 26, 1855 – March 23, 1937) was a leader in the Primary and Young Women organizations of the Church of Jesus Christ of Latter-day Saints (LDS Church).

Lelia Tuckett was born in Salt Lake City, Utah Territory to Mormon parents. She attended Morgan Commercial College, a business school in Salt Lake City established by John Hamilton Morgan. In 1875 she married James Perry Freeze. Freeze was a leader in a Salt Lake City ward's branch of the Young Ladies Mutual Improvement Association (YLMIA). In this capacity, she was invited to speak at the Salt Lake Tabernacle on April 6, 1880, at a celebration of the 50th anniversary of the LDS Church's founding.

In 1880, Lillie Freeze was one of the founding members of the LDS Church's Primary Association. Freeze was appointed as the first secretary of the general presidency, which was composed of Louie B. Felt, Matilda M. Barratt, and Clara C. M. Cannon. Freeze was secretary until 1888, when she replaced Barratt as first counselor in the general presidency of the Primary. Freeze was Felt's first counselor until 1905, when she was released and succeeded by May Anderson.

From 1889 to 1906, Freeze was also a member of the general board of the YLMIA. Freeze wrote extensively for LDS Church publications and published works in the Deseret News, the Children's Friend, the Women's Exponent, the Improvement Era, and the Young Woman's Journal. At a conference of the YLMIA in Box Elder County, Utah Territory, Freeze stated that Joseph Smith had prophesied that "the time would come that none but the women of the Latter-day Saints would be willing to bear children."

Freeze was the mother of two sons and two daughters. She died at Salt Lake City and was buried at the Salt Lake City Cemetery.

== Notes ==
The Church of Jesus Christ of Latter-day Saints titles
Preceded by Matilda M. Barratt	First Counselor in the general presidency of the Primary; 1888 — 1905	Succeeded by May Anderson
