= Edna Thomas =

Edna Thomas may refer to:

- Edna Harker Thomas (1881–1942), leader in the Church of Jesus Christ of Latter-day Saints
- Edna Lewis Thomas (1885–1974), American actress
- Edna Thomas (footballer) (active in 2010), Papua New Guinean footballer and manager
- Edna Thomas (singer), singer and recording artist who performed Negro spirituals
