= Sadie Pack =

Sadie Pack may refer to:

- Sadie Grant Pack, a member of the Church of Jesus Christ of Latter-day Saints
- Sarah Martha "Sadie" Emison Pack, namesake of Sadieville, Kentucky
