= Franklin L. West =

American educator (1885–1966)

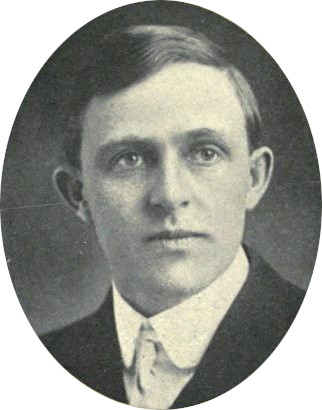
- Born: February 1, 1885; Ogden, Utah
- Died: October 21, 1966 (aged 81)
- Occupation: Physics professor
- Known for: Commissioner of Church Educational System, Church of Jesus Christ of Latter-day Saints

Franklin Lorenzo Richards West (February 1, 1885 – October 21, 1966) was an American educator and a leader in the Church of Jesus Christ of Latter-day Saints (LDS Church).

West was born and raised in Ogden, Utah Territory, to Joseph A. West and Josephine Richards. He earned a B.S. from the Utah Agricultural College in 1904 and a Ph.D from the University of Chicago in 1911. West was a professor of physics at the Utah Agricultural College, which is today Utah State University. For 28 years he was the dean of faculty at the school.

From 1935 to 1937, West was the second assistant to Albert E. Bowen, the head of the LDS Church's Young Men's Mutual Improvement Association. In 1936, he became the eighth Commissioner of Church Education, a position he held until he retired in 1953.

West was the author of five books, including three manuals for the Church Educational System and a biography of his maternal grandfather, LDS Church apostle Franklin D. Richards. West was also the grandson of Chauncey W. West, a Mormon pioneer and prominent leader of the LDS Church in Weber County, Utah for whom he also wrote a biography. West, also a descendant of LDS Church apostle Lorenzo Snow, was named Franklin Lorenzo, in honor of his family heritage.

West was married to Gladys Spencer, August 19, 1904 a granddaughter of Brigham Young and a member of the prominent Thatcher Young family of Logan, Utah. Children: Gladys Virginia and Marjorie West. They later divorced and, West married Violet Madsen, February 12, 1920 of Ogden, Utah. After Violet Madsen's death, he married Mrs. Sarah Frances Nelson Malmborg who survived him.
