= Chauncey W. West =

American Mormon bishop (1827–1870)

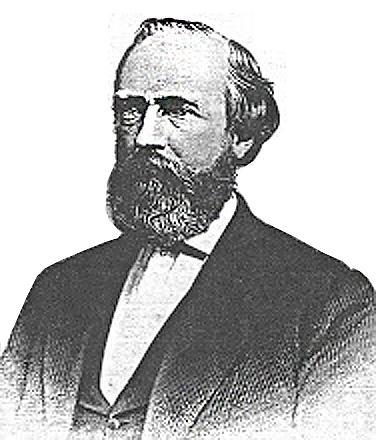
- Bishop C.W. West c1865
- Born: February 6, 1827; Venango, Pennsylvania
- Died: January 9, 1870 (aged 42); San Francisco, California

Chauncey Walker West (February 6, 1827 – January 9, 1870) was a Mormon pioneer and was a leader of the Church of Jesus Christ of Latter-day Saints (LDS Church) in Utah Territory. He was among the church's first missionaries to preach in Sri Lanka.

West was born in Venango (possibly in the town of Pleasantville), Crawford County, Pennsylvania. He and his family joined the LDS Church when he was 16. In 1844, he moved with his parents to Nauvoo, Illinois to join the gathering of Latter Day Saints. In 1846, West's company of Mormon pioneers left Nauvoo for Winter Quarters, Nebraska. There were three parts of the migration from Nauvoo to Winter Quarters that year. The first was the "winter exodus" from March to June. The second was the "spring exodus", and the finally the "fall exodus". West and his family were almost certainly part of the winter or spring exodus groups. The following year, in June 1847, he joined the Hunter/Horne Company on their journey to the Salt Lake Valley, arriving on September 29, 1847. Prior to his final journey to the Salt Lake Valley, both of West's parents died during the winter of 1846–1847 at Winter Quarters (Florence), Nebraska. West, now married and the father of one, traveled westward with his wife, Mary, his infant child, Margaret, and younger sister, Adelia Marie. His older brother, Ira, followed them a year later to Utah Territory.

In 1852, West was sent on an LDS Church mission to Asia. West preached in India, Ceylon, and Hong Kong. With his companion, Benjamin F. Dewey, West was the first LDS missionary to preach in Sri Lanka (Ceylon).

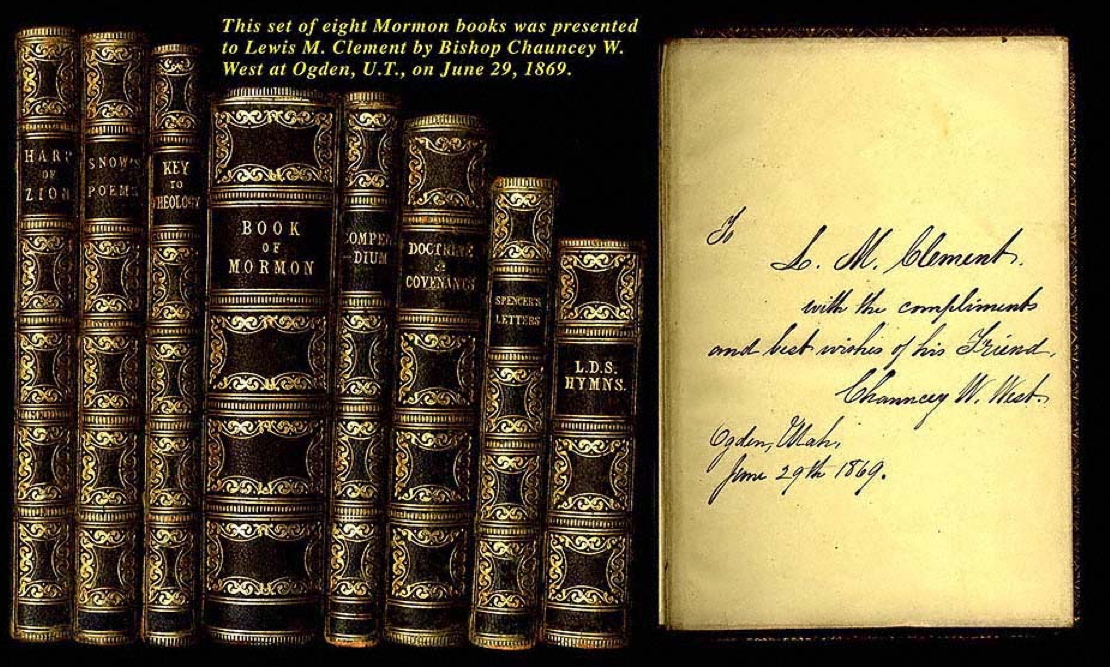
1852 British edition of the Book of Mormon and seven other LDS books presented by C.W. West to L.M. Clement of the CPRR at Ogden in 1869.

When he returned to Utah Territory in 1855, West was appointed the presiding bishop of Weber County, Utah Territory and moved to Ogden. In 1856, he was elected to the House of Representatives in the Utah Territorial Legislative Assembly, where he served until 1862 and again from 1864 to 1869. The break in his legislative service was due to being called on another mission, this time to preside over the church in Europe, where many converts during this period were emigrating to Utah.

West was involved in coordinating the employment of Latter-day Saints in the construction of the first transcontinental railroad for Central Pacific in Utah Territory. On May 10, 1869, he was present as a representative of the LDS Church at the driving of the "Last Spike" at Promontory Summit, Utah.

West practiced plural marriage and had nine wives and 35 children.

West suffered from lung disease, possibly in consequence of his years working on the railroad. In 1869, he went to California in hope of improving his health, but ultimately died in San Francisco early the following year. His body was returned to Ogden where he is buried.

The city of Farr West, Utah, was named to honor West's contributions to Weber County, Utah.

== See also ==
- Elam Luddington

== Sources ==
- Franklin L. West (1965). Chauncey W. West: Pioneer—Churchman. (Salt Lake City, Utah)
