= Farr West, Utah =

City in Utah, United States

- City
- Location in Weber County and the state of Utah
- Coordinates: 41°18′06″N 112°01′54″W
- Country: United States
- State: Utah
- County: Weber
- Settled: 1858
- Incorporated: 1981
- Founder: Joseph Taylor
- Named for: Lorin Farr and Chauncey W. West and a nod to Far West, Missouri

Area
  - Total: 5.92 sq mi (15.33 km^{2})
  - Land: 5.92 sq mi (15.33 km^{2})
  - Water: 0 sq mi (0.00 km^{2})
- Elevation: 4,252 ft (1,296 m)

Population (2020)
  - Total: 7,691
  - Estimate (2019): 7,385
  - Density: 1,247.4/sq mi (481.62/km^{2})
- Time zone: UTC-7 (Mountain (MST))
  - Summer (DST): UTC-6 (MDT)
- ZIP code: 84404
- Area codes: 385, 801
- FIPS code: 49-24850
- GNIS feature ID: 2410489
- Website: farrwestcity.gov

Farr West is a city on the northern edge of Weber County, Utah. The population was 7,691 at the 2020 census, up from 5,928 at the 2010 census. It is part of the Ogden–Clearfield metropolitan area. As of January 2026, the mayor is David Bolos.

== Geography ==
According to the United States Census Bureau, the city has a total area of 5.8 square miles (15.1 km^{2}), all land.

Farr West is bordered by Plain City to the west, Willard to the north, Pleasant View to the northeast, Harrisville to the east, and Marriott-Slaterville to the south.

== History ==
The city was named after Lorin Farr and Chauncey W. West, who was the son-in-law of Abraham Hoagland. The name echoes "Far West", an important early Mormon settlement in frontier Missouri. The city was led by Mayor Jimmie Papageorge.

In 2014, Wahlquist Junior High was rebuilt and moved to another location in Farr West. There is now an elementary in the northern part of Farr West named Silver Ridge Elementary, which was erected in 2020.

== Demographics ==
Historical population
Census	Pop.	Note	%±
1980	1,451		—
1990	2,178		50.1%
2000	3,094		42.1%
2010	5,928		91.6%
2020	7,691		29.7%
2023 (est.)	8,021		4.3%
U.S. Decennial Census

=== 2020 census ===
As of the 2020 census, Farr West had a population of 7,691. The median age was 36.5 years. 31.8% of residents were under the age of 18 and 12.3% of residents were 65 years of age or older. For every 100 females there were 100.0 males, and for every 100 females age 18 and over there were 95.9 males age 18 and over.

100.0% of residents lived in urban areas, while 0.0% lived in rural areas.

There were 2,371 households in Farr West, of which 44.3% had children under the age of 18 living in them. Of all households, 75.8% were married-couple households, 8.6% were households with a male householder and no spouse or partner present, and 13.4% were households with a female householder and no spouse or partner present. About 15.1% of all households were made up of individuals and 8.1% had someone living alone who was 65 years of age or older.

There were 2,433 housing units, of which 2.5% were vacant. The homeowner vacancy rate was 1.3% and the rental vacancy rate was 7.1%.

=== 2000 census ===
As of the 2000 census, there were 3,094 people, 1,034 households, and 822 families residing in the city. The population density was 530.0 people per square mile (204.6/km^{2}). There were 1,088 housing units at an average density of 186.4 per square mile (71.9/km^{2}). The racial makeup of the city was 97.09% White, 0.23% African American, 0.39% Native American, 0.58% Asian, 0.87% from other races, and 0.84% from two or more races. Hispanic or Latino of any race were 2.78% of the population.

There were 1,034 households, out of which 40.3% had children under 18 living with them, 70.3% were married couples living together, 6.7% had a female householder with no husband present, and 20.5% were non-families. 19.2% of all households were made up of individuals, and 10.5% had someone living alone who was 65 years of age or older. The average household size was 2.99, and the average family size was 3.46.

In the city, the population was spread out, with 31.7% under 18, 9.0% from 18 to 24, 24.0% from 25 to 44, 20.8% from 45 to 64, and 14.5% who were 65 years of age or older. The median age was 36 years. For every 100 females, there were 93.7 males. For every 100 females aged 18 and over, there were 89.9 males.

The median income for a household in the city was $41,618, and the median income for a family was $48,276. Males had a median income of $43,094 versus $25,871 for females. The per capita income for the city was $17,411. About 2.0% of families and 2.5% of the population were below the poverty line, including none of those under age 18 and 7.8% of those aged 65 or over.

== Politics ==
Farr West is located in Utah's 1st congressional district. In the 118th United States Congress, Blake Moore (R-Salt Lake City) represents the district

== See also ==
- List of cities and towns in Utah
