= Elbert D. Thomas =

American politician

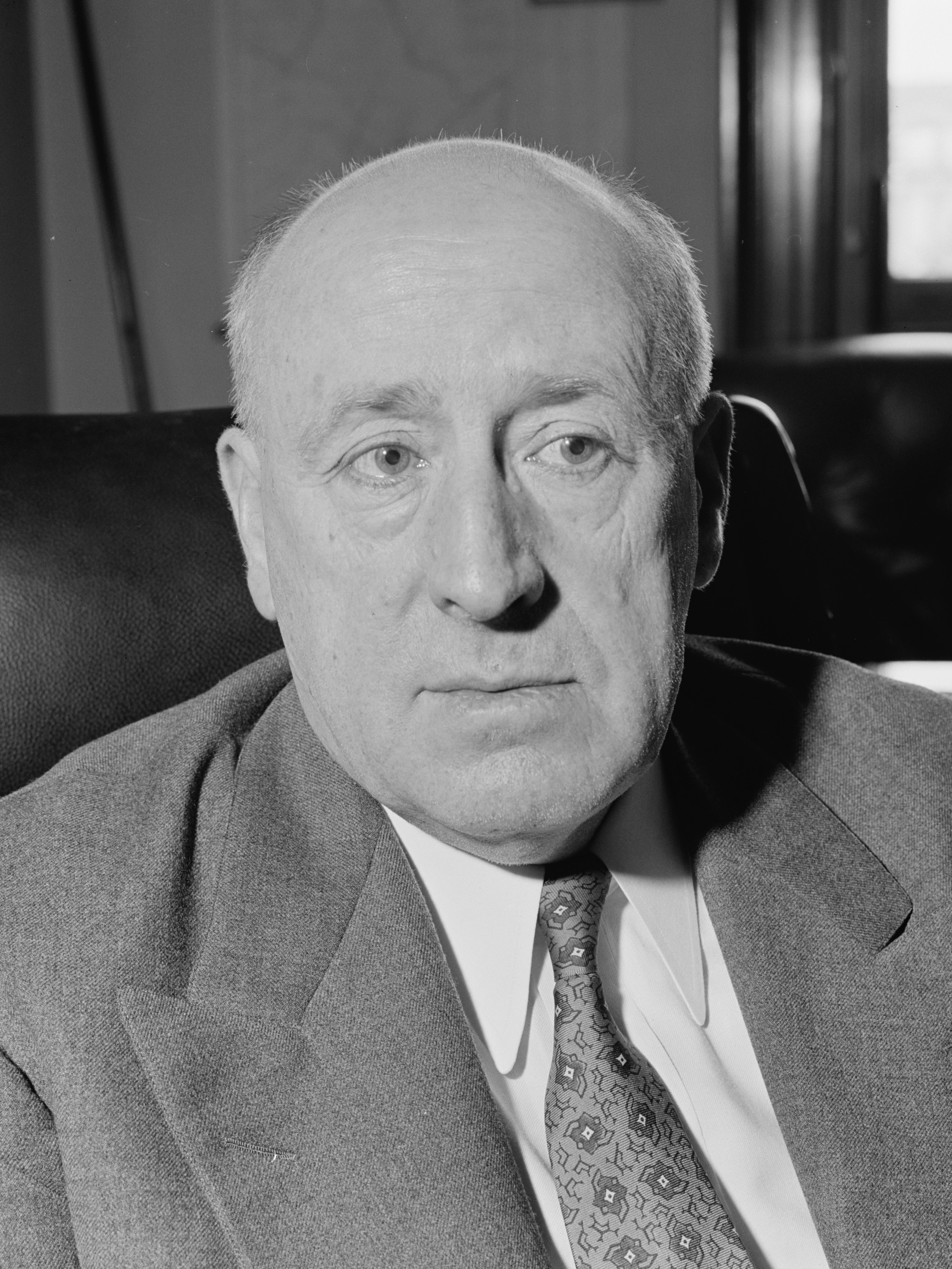
- Thomas in 1940

United States Senator from Utah
- In office March 4, 1933 – January 3, 1951
- Preceded by: Reed Smoot
- Succeeded by: Wallace F. Bennett

4th High Commissioner of the Trust Territory of the Pacific Islands
- In office January 6, 1951 – February 11, 1953
- Preceded by: Arthur W. Radford
- Succeeded by: Frank E. Midkiff

Personal details
- Born: Elbert Duncan Thomas; June 17, 1883 Salt Lake City, Utah Territory, U.S.
- Died: February 11, 1953 (aged 69) Honolulu, Hawaii Territory, U.S.
- Resting place: Salt Lake City Cemetery; 40°46′37.92″N 111°51′28.8″W
- Party: Democratic
- Spouses: Edna Harker (m. 1907; died 1942); Ethel Evans (m. 1946)
- Children: 3
- Education: University of Utah; University of California, Berkeley

Military service
- Allegiance: United States
- Branch/service: United States Army (Reserves); Utah National Guard

Elbert Duncan Thomas (June 17, 1883 – February 11, 1953) was a Democratic Party politician from Utah. He represented Utah in the United States Senate from 1933 until 1951. He served as the Chair of the Senate Education Committee, and is the last Democrat to serve as Utah's Class 3 senator.

== Biography ==
Thomas was born in Salt Lake City, Utah Territory, on June 17, 1883, to Caroline Stockdale and Richard Kendall Thomas. He was the tenth of thirteen children. His parents loved the arts, especially the theater. They built the first Children's Playhouse west of the Mississippi River in a barn on their property, which they named the Barnacle. Elbert was involved in many plays held for the public in the Barnacle. His father was involved in local government and held conventions and political rallies at the Barnacle. His family later moved to a home across from what is now the Conference Center of the Church of Jesus Christ of Latter-day Saints (LDS Church). This home is listed on the National Register of Historic Places. While an undergraduate student at the University of Utah, Thomas helped found the Amici Fidissimi Society in 1902. The AF Society was a men's fraternal organization which later affiliated with Phi Delta Theta fraternity, an international college fraternity, in 1914, becoming the Utah Alpha chapter of the Fraternity. Elbert was the first initiate into Phi Delta Theta at the University of Utah.

Thomas married Edna Harker on June 25, 1907, in the Salt Lake Temple and they had three daughters together. Edna died in 1942, and Elbert later married Ethel Evans in 1946 in the Salt Lake Temple.

== Church service ==
Thomas served a mission to Japan for the LDS Church with his first wife, from 1907 to 1912. He was one of the first LDS missionaries sent to Japan, and his first daughter, Chiyo, was born there. Elbert developed a deep love for the Japanese people and learned to speak Japanese fluently. He was the author of Sukui No Michi, the Japanese translation of the Mormon tract Way of Salvation. For part of his five-year mission, Thomas was the president of the Japanese Mission. On his return from Japan, he became a Professor of Political Science and History at the University of Utah (where he had received his BA in 1906). He taught Latin, Greek, and Japanese culture, as well as being a political science and history professor and eventually an administrator on the Board of Regents at the University of Utah for many years.

== Political office ==
Thomas was first elected to the Senate as a Democrat in 1932, defeating Republican Reed Smoot. He served on the Committee on Education and Labor (of which he was the Chairman), the Committee on Military Affairs, the Mines and Mining Committee, and the Committee on Labor and Public Welfare.

In April 1943, a confidential analysis of the Senate Foreign Relations Committee by British scholar Isaiah Berlin for the British Foreign Office characterized Thomas as:

a Mormon ex-missionary, whose work was mostly done in the Far East. He speaks Japanese fluently, and his attitudes towards post-war problems is coloured principally by his Far Eastern views which are summed up in his statement that "the days of the white man's domination are over and the British Empire is almost certain to be dissolved in that part of the world." He is an out and out internationalist and interventionist, who has voted with the Administration on all foreign measures. He is essentially a free trader but, nevertheless, occasionally votes with the Farm Bloc which is powerful in the agricultural State which he represents. He is an ardent champion of the Jewish army scheme.

Thomas was among twelve nominated at the 1944 Democratic National Convention to serve as Franklin D. Roosevelt's running mate in the presidential election that year. He served three terms before being defeated for reelection by Wallace F. Bennett in 1950. In 1951, he was appointed High Commissioner over the Trust Territory of the Pacific Islands. Elbert died in Honolulu, Hawaii Territory, on February 11, 1953. He was buried in the Thomas family plot in the Salt Lake City Cemetery.

== Legacy ==
The Gibbs-Thomas House, in Salt Lake City, which was Thomas's sole residence in Utah, was listed on the National Register of Historic Places in 1984 in large part to recognize his association.

Party political offices
Preceded by Ashby Snow	Democratic nominee for U.S. Senator from Utah (Class 3); 1932, 1938, 1944, 1950	Succeeded by Alonzo F. Hopkin
U.S. Senate
Preceded by Reed Smoot	U.S. senator (Class 3) from Utah; 1933–1951; Served alongside: William H. King, Abe Murdock, Arthur V. Watkins	Succeeded by Wallace F. Bennett
