= Clara W. Beebe =

American Mormon leader (1868–1927)

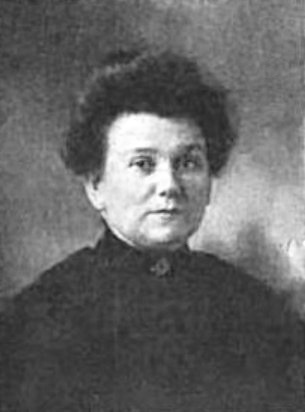

Second Counselor in the general presidency of the Primary
- 1906 – 1925
- Called by: Louie B. Felt
- Predecessor: Josephine R. West
- Successor: Isabelle S. Ross

Personal details
- Born: Clara M. Woodruff; July 23, 1868; Salt Lake City, Utah Territory, United States
- Died: December 29, 1927 (aged 59); Salt Lake City, Utah, United States
- Cause of death: appendicitis
- Resting place: Salt Lake City Cemetery; 40.777°N 111.858°W
- Residence: July 23, 1868 – December 29, 1927
- Alma mater: University of Deseret
- Spouse(s): Ovando C. Beebe
- Children: 8
- Parents: Wilford Woodruff; Emma Smith

Clara Martishia Woodruff Beebe (July 23, 1868 – December 29, 1927) was the second counselor in the general presidency of the Primary of the Church of Jesus Christ of Latter-day Saints (LDS Church) from 1905 to 1925.

Clara M. Woodruff was born in Salt Lake City, Utah Territory. She was the daughter of Wilford Woodruff and one of his plural wives, Emma Smith Woodruff. Clara married Ovando C. Beebe, with whom she had eight children.

Clara Beebe attended the University of Deseret. She had served in leadership positions of ward and stake primaries before being called to the Primary General Board in 1904. In 1905, she was asked by the general president of the primary, Louie B. Felt, to replace Josephine R. West as her second counselor. Beebe served in this capacity until the presidency was dissolved in 1925 when Felt stepped down due to ill health. From this time until her death, Beebe again was a member of the General Board of the Primary.

As a member of the general presidency, Beebe oversaw the performance of baptisms for the dead by Primary-age children.

Beebe died in Salt Lake City at age 59 as a result of appendicitis.

== Notes ==
The Church of Jesus Christ of Latter-day Saints titles
Preceded by Josephine R. West	Second Counselor in the general presidency of the Primary; 1906 — 1925	Succeeded by Isabelle S. Ross
