= Isabelle S. Ross =

Member of the general presidency of the Primary organization

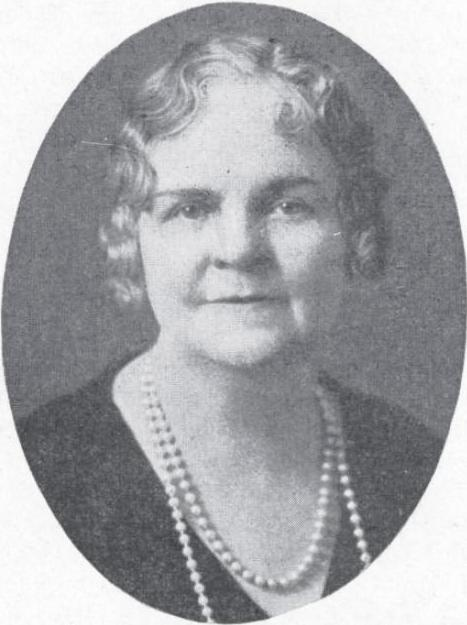
- Ross (ca. 1936)

First Counselor in the general presidency of the Primary
- September 11, 1929 – 1939
- Called by: May Anderson
- Predecessor: Sadie Grant Pack
- Successor: Adele C. Howells

Second Councilor in the general presidency of the Primary
- 1925 – September 11, 1929
- Called by: May Anderson
- Predecessor: Clara W. Beebe
- Successor: Edna H. Thomas

Personal details
- Born: Isabelle Salmon; November 1, 1867; Perry, Utah Territory, United States
- Died: December 28, 1947 (aged 80); Salt Lake City, Utah, United States
- Cause of death: Coronary heart disease
- Resting place: Salt Lake City Cemetery; 40.777°N 111.858°W
- Alma mater: University of Utah
- Occupation: Director of Physical Education
- Employer: Brigham young College; School for the deaf and blind at Ogden, Utah
- Spouse(s): Charles J. Ross
- Parents: William Weir Salmon; Margaret Hay Hunter

Isabelle Salmon Ross (November 1, 1867 – December 28, 1947) was a member of the general presidency of the Primary organization of the Church of Jesus Christ of Latter-day Saints from 1925 to 1939.

Isabelle Salmon was born in Perry, Utah Territory to William Weir Salmon and Margaret Hay Hunter. She was trained as a schoolteacher at the University of Utah and Harvard University. She taught in the public school system in Salt Lake City and at Brigham Young College and the Utah State School for the Deaf and the Blind in Ogden. In 1897, she married Charles James Ross in the Salt Lake Temple; Charles Ross was from Ogden and was a member of the general board of the Deseret Sunday School Union.

In 1925, when May Anderson became the general president of the Primary, Isabelle Ross was selected as her second counselor. Ross acted in this capacity until 1929, when Ross became Anderson's first counselor to succeed Sadie Pack Grant. Ross continued as a member of the Primary general presidency until 1939, when Anderson and her counselors were released as a general presidency.

Ross died in Salt Lake City and was buried at the Salt Lake City Cemetery.

The Church of Jesus Christ of Latter-day Saints titles
| Preceded by Sadie Grant Pack | First Counselor in the general presidency of the Primary; September 11, 1929 – 1939 | Succeeded by Adele C. Howells |
| Preceded by Clara W. Beebe | Second Counselor in the general presidency of the Primary; 1925 – September 11, 1929 | Succeeded by Edna H. Thomas |
