= Angus M. Cannon =

American mayor

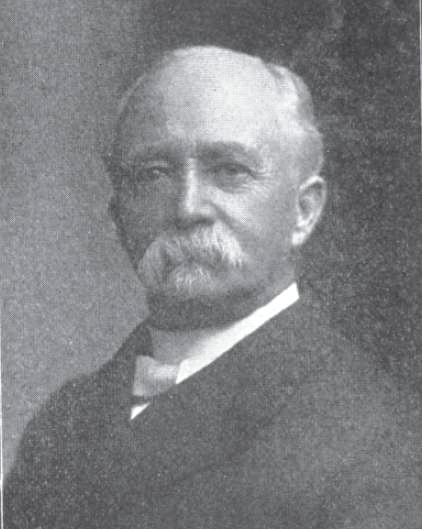
Angus Munn Cannon

Angus Munn Cannon (May 17, 1834 – June 7, 1915) was an early Latter Day Saint leader and Mormon pioneer.

== Early life ==
Cannon was born in Liverpool, Lancashire, England. His Manx parents joined the Church of Jesus Christ of Latter Day Saints in 1840, being baptized by his uncle John Taylor.

In 1842, the Cannon family went to Nauvoo, Illinois, United States. By 1849, they were in Utah Territory. Cannon was the younger brother of George Q. Cannon and their lives followed very similar paths up until their arrival in Utah.

== Church service ==
In 1854, Cannon went on a mission for the Church of Jesus Christ of Latter-day Saints (LDS Church) to the Eastern United States, where he assisted John Taylor in publishing a periodical entitled The Mormon. He also preached and baptized in Connecticut, New Jersey, Pennsylvania and Delaware. Cannon returned to Utah Territory due to the troubles connected with the Utah War.

In 1864, Cannon helped establish Call's Landing on the Colorado River, later known as Callville, Nevada. Callville was submerged when Lake Mead was filled.

In 1869 and 1870, Cannon served a second mission in the Eastern United States. In April 1876, Cannon became president of the Salt Lake Stake of the LDS Church. He served in this position until April 1, 1904. This stake was the largest and most important stake of the Church at the time, often considered to be the "flagship stake" of the Church, which made Cannon the most important stake president of the time. After his time as stake president, Cannon served as a patriarch in the church.

== Politics ==
Cannon was the mayor of St. George, Utah Territory in 1861 and 1862. In 1896, after Utah had become a U.S. state, he stood for election as the Republican Party candidate for a state senate seat in Salt Lake County. He was defeated by one of his wives, Martha Hughes Cannon, who was the Democratic Party candidate.

== Polygamy prosecution ==
Like many early members of the LDS Church, Cannon practiced plural marriage. Cannon was the appellant in the case of Cannon v. United States, which was decided by the United States Supreme Court in 1885. Cannon had been convicted under the Edmunds Act of unlawful cohabitation with more than one wife and sentenced to six months' imprisonment and a $900 fine. Cannon appealed his conviction on the grounds that he had immediately ceased having sexual relations with the two wives he was accused of cohabiting with after polygamy was criminalized. The Court rejected Cannon's argument, holding that "[c]ompacts for sexual non-intercourse, easily made and easily broken, when the prior marriage relations continue to exist, with the occupation of the same house and table and the keeping up of the same family unity, is not a lawful substitute for the monogamous family which alone the statute tolerates."

Cannon was pardoned in 1894 by U.S. President Grover Cleveland.

== Death ==
Cannon died of "apoplexy" in Salt Lake City, Utah.

== See also ==
- Clara C. M. Cannon
