= Edna Harker Thomas =

American religious leader

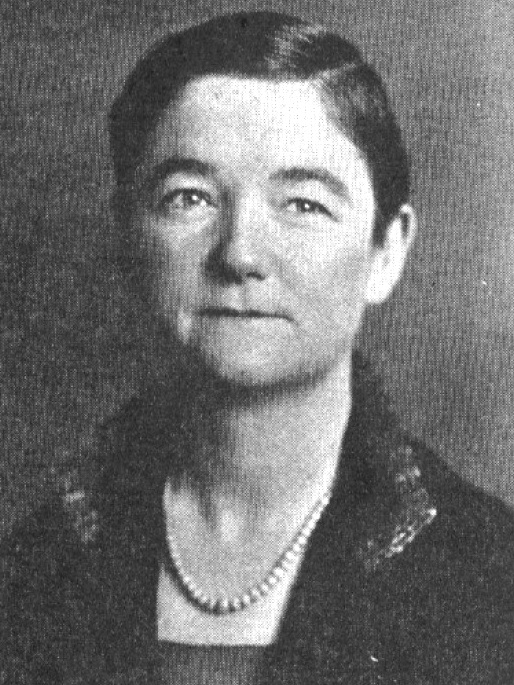

Second Counselor in the general presidency of the Primary
- 1929 – 1933
- Called by: May Anderson
- Predecessor: Isabelle S. Ross
- Successor: Edith H. Lambert

Personal details
- Born: Edna Harker; April 11, 1881; Taylorsville, Utah Territory, United States
- Died: April 29, 1942 (aged 61); Washington, D.C., United States
- Resting place: Salt Lake City Cemetery; 40.777°N 111.858°W
- Alma mater: Brigham Young University; University of California, Berkeley; American University
- Spouse(s): Elbert D. Thomas (m. 1907)
- Children: 3
- Parents: Benjamin E. Harker; Harriet Bennion

Edna Harker Thomas (April 11, 1881 – April 29, 1942) was a leader in the Church of Jesus Christ of Latter-day Saints (LDS Church). She was the first wife of Elbert D. Thomas, a United States senator from Utah. She was also the first woman in the LDS Church to travel around the world.

== Early life and education ==
Edna Harker was born in Taylorsville, Utah Territory to Benjamin E. Harker and Harriet Bennion. Harker studied at Brigham Young University, University of California, Berkeley and at the American University. She attended the University of Utah, where she taught physical education after graduating. She was also involved in the university's theater club and performed at the Salt Lake Theatre. The Truth called her "the University Bernhart."

== Career ==
She was a teacher in the public schools of Salt Lake City. In 1904, she became a member of the general board of the Primary Association of the LDS Church.

Shortly after their marriage, Elbert and Edna Thomas were sent by the LDS Church to Japan as full-time missionaries. They were missionaries in Japan until 1912; during part of this time, Elbert Thomas was the president of the Japanese Mission. Edna learned traditional Japanese stories while on the mission, which she would tell later in the United States in "Japanese costume." She would also later give lectures about Japan. After completing the Japanese mission, she and her husband traveled through Korea, China, southern Asia, northern Africa and into Europe before returning to Salt Lake City in 1913. The couple lived in California between 1922 and 1924 before again returning to Utah.

Edna Thomas continued as a member of the Primary Association's general board and in 1929 she succeeded Isabelle S. Ross as the second counselor to May Anderson in the Primary's general presidency. She served in this capacity until 1933, when she was released as a counselor and as a member of the Primary Association's general board to allow her to move to Washington, D.C., with her husband, who had defeated Reed Smoot in the 1932 election to be the United States Senator for Utah.

In 1934, the Senator and Mrs. Thomas traveled in Nazi Germany for ten weeks on a fact-finding mission sponsored by an Oberlander fellowship given to the Senator by the University of Utah. Thomas kept a diary of their trip in which she wrote, "We are doing just what President Roosevelt asked us to do, meet and talk with the educated people."

== Personal life ==
In 1907, she married Elbert D. Thomas in the Salt Lake Temple. Edna Thomas died of a heart attack on April 29, 1942, in Washington, D.C. She was the mother of three daughters, the eldest of whom was born in Japan. She was buried at Salt Lake City Cemetery.

== Sources ==
- Jenson, Andrew (1936). Latter-day Saint biographical encyclopedia: A compilation of biographical sketches of prominent men and women in the Church of Jesus Christ of Latter-Day Saints. Vol. 4. Salt Lake City, Utah: The Andrew Jenson History Company (Printed by The Deseret News Press). pp. 301–302.

The Church of Jesus Christ of Latter-day Saints titles
Preceded by Isabelle S. Ross	Second Counselor in the general presidency of the Primary; 1929 – 1933	Succeeded by Edith H. Lambert
