= Sadie Grant Pack =

American Mormon leader (1877–1960)

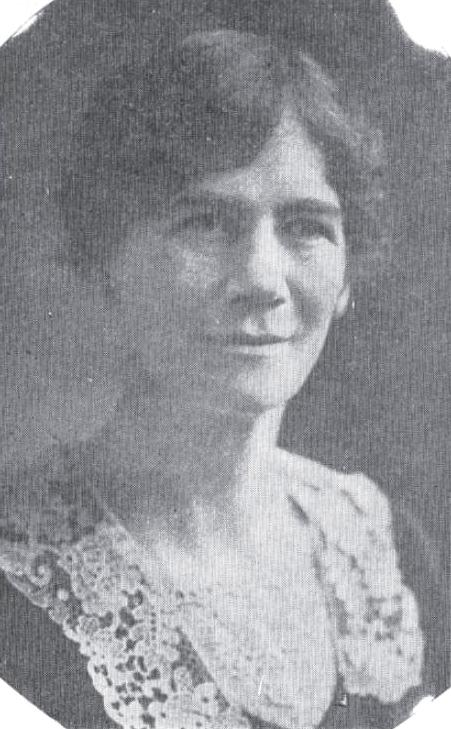
- Pack (ca. 1936)

First Counselor in the general presidency of the Primary
- October 6, 1925 – September 11, 1929
- Called by: May Anderson
- Predecessor: May Anderson
- Successor: Isabelle S. Ross

Personal details
- Born: Sadie Grant; December 20, 1877; West Bountiful, Utah Territory
- Died: August 24, 1960 (aged 82); Salt Lake City, Utah, US
- Resting place: Salt Lake City Cemetery; 40.777°N 111.858°W
- Alma mater: University of Utah
- Spouse(s): Frederick J. Pack
- Children: 4
- Parents: Joseph H. Grant; Evaletta Eldredge
- Relatives: Jedediah M. Grant (grandfather)

Sadie Grant Pack (December 20, 1877 – August 24, 1960) was the first counselor to May Anderson in the general presidency of the Primary of the Church of Jesus Christ of Latter-day Saints from 1925 to 1929.

Sadie Grant was born in West Bountiful, Utah Territory to Joseph Hyrum Grant (a son of Jedediah M. Grant) and Evaletta Eldredge. She was educated at the University of Utah, where she met her future husband, Frederick J. Pack, who was also a native of West Bountiful. Grant and Pack married in November 1896 and later that year began service as an LDS Church missionaries in the Colorado Mission of the church.

From 1904 to 1906 while her husband was a student at Columbia University, Sadie was president of the LDS Relief Society in New York and Brooklyn.

Pack held a variety of callings in the Relief Society, the Young Women's Mutual Improvement Association and the Primary prior to her call as first counselor in the general presidency of the Primary. In 1925, when May Anderson was called as the general president of the Primary, she selected Pack as her first counselor. Pack was released in 1929 and was succeeded by Isabelle S. Ross.

Pack and her husband were the parents of four children. Pack died in Salt Lake City, Utah.

Saide Grant Pack was a granddaughter of prominent church leader Jedediah M. Grant and was a niece to LDS Church president Heber J. Grant.

The Church of Jesus Christ of Latter-day Saints titles
Preceded by May Anderson	First Counselor in the general presidency of the Primary; October 6, 1925 – September 11, 1929	Succeeded by Isabelle S. Ross
