= Matilda M. Barratt =

American Mormon member (1837–1902)

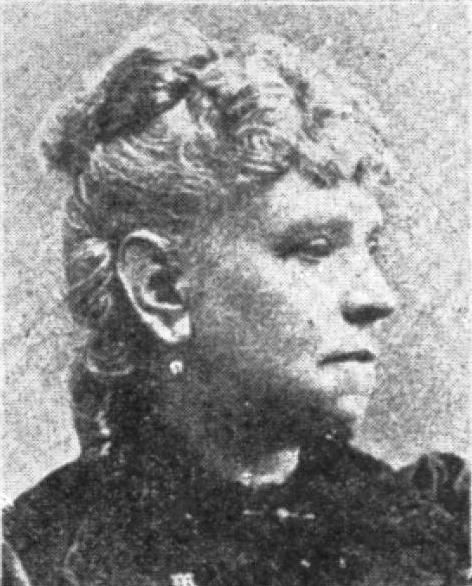

First Counselor in the general presidency of the Primary
- June 19, 1880 – 1888
- Called by: Louie B. Felt
- Successor: Lillie T. Freeze

Personal details
- Born: Matilda Moorhouse; January 17, 1837; Stockport, England
- Died: April 14, 1902 (aged 65); Salt Lake City, Utah, United States
- Resting place: Salt Lake City Cemetery; 40.777°N 111.858°W
- Spouse(s): John Barratt
- Children: 3

Matilda Moorhouse Barratt (January 17, 1837 – April 14, 1902) was a member of the first-ever general presidency of the Primary organization of the Church of Jesus Christ of Latter-day Saints (LDS Church) from 1880 to 1888.

Matilda Moorehouse was born in Stockport, Cheshire, England. She married John Barratt in 1864 and converted to the LDS Church. In 1876, she emigrated to Utah Territory and settled in Salt Lake City. In 1880, when the Primary was organized with Louie B. Felt as general president, Felt selected Barratt to serve as her first counselor in the Primary general presidency. Barratt served in this position until 1888, when she was succeeded by Lillie T. Freeze. During her time as a member of the Primary general presidency, Barratt also served as the treasurer of the Deseret Hospital.

Barratt was the mother of three children. Her two daughters died in infancy and her son Samuel Barratt died in 1900 after serving as a LDS Church missionary in England.

Barratt was wealthy and donated much of her money to educational institutions in Utah. In memory of her son, she donated $25,000 for the construction of Barratt Hall at the Latter-day Saints' University. Barratt died in Salt Lake City and is buried at Salt Lake City Cemetery.

The Church of Jesus Christ of Latter-day Saints titles
First	First Counselor in the general presidency of the Primary; 1880 — 1888	Succeeded by Lillie T. Freeze
