= May Anderson =

American Mormon religious leader

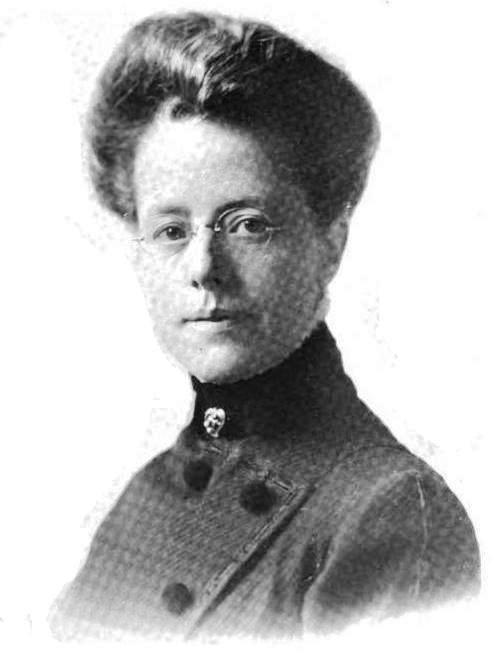
- Anderson in a 1912 publication

2nd General President of the Primary
- October 6, 1925 – 1939
- Called by: Heber J. Grant
- Predecessor: Louie B. Felt
- Successor: May Green Hinckley

First Counselor in the general presidency of the Primary
- 1905 – October 6, 1925
- Called by: Louie B. Felt
- Predecessor: Lillie T. Freeze
- Successor: Sadie Grant Pack

Personal details
- Born: June 8, 1864; Liverpool, UK
- Died: June 10, 1946 (aged 82); Salt Lake City, Utah, United States
- Resting place: Salt Lake City Cemetery; 40.777°N 111.858°W
- Alma mater: University of Utah
- Occupation: Kindergarten Teacher; President of the board of trustees of the Children's hospital in Salt Lake City.
- Notable works: Editor of The Children's Friend
- Parents: Scott Anderson; Mary Bruce
- Awards: Bronze medal (U.S. Department of Labor 1919) Victory Loan Medal (U S treasury department 1919)

May Anderson (June 8, 1864 – June 10, 1946) was the second general president of the children's Primary organization of the Church of Jesus Christ of Latter-day Saints (LDS Church) between 1925 and 1939. Anderson also served as the first counselor to general Primary president Louie B. Felt from 1905 to 1925.

== Early life ==
Anderson was born in Liverpool, England, the third of Scott Anderson and Mary Bruce's 12 children. She emigrated to Utah Territory with her family after the family had been baptized by missionaries of the LDS Church. During the journey to Utah, Anderson met Louie B. Felt, who would become a lifelong friend and co-worker in the Primary of the church.

== Involvement with the Primary Association ==
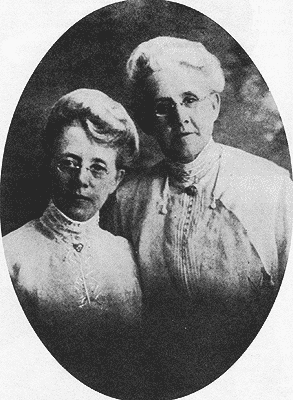
Louie Felt (right) and May Anderson (left)

On October 5, 1890, Louie B. Felt, the general president of the Primary Association, asked Anderson to become a member of the general board of the organization. For the next forty-nine years, Anderson would work in some capacity in the Primary organization of the LDS Church. She was the general board's secretary for fifteen years (1890–1905), Felt's first counselor in the general presidency for twenty years (1905–25), and general president of the organization for fourteen years (1925–39). Anderson was also the first editor-in-chief of The Children's Friend, the church's official magazine for children.

During her tenure in the presidency of the Primary, Anderson initiated the Primary Children's Hospital in Salt Lake City, which is today part of Intermountain Healthcare. Anderson also helped establish kindergartens in Utah. Anderson's successor to the Primary general presidency was May Green Hinckley.

Anderson did not marry and died at Salt Lake City of arteriosclerosis. She was buried at Salt Lake City.

== Relationship with Louie Felt ==
Anderson had a lifelong friendship with fellow church leader Louie B. Felt. When Felt was suffering an illness in 1889, Felt's husband Joseph requested May to stay there to care for her while he was away on a business trip. During the period that Anderson was the editor-in-chief of The Children's Friend, it published an anonymous account of the friendship that existed between Felt and Anderson; the article referred to the couple as the "David and Jonathan of the Primary" organization. This has led two dissident Mormon historians to theorize that Anderson and Felt had a partially closeted lesbian relationship.

However, other LDS researchers have disagreed with this theory, calling it a distortion of LDS history and a misrepresention of facts. Two researchers have stated: "No evidence exists to lead us to believe that their relationship was anything but that of true and chaste Christian friendship and sisterly love."

== See also ==
- Sadie Grant Pack
- Isabelle S. Ross

== Notes ==
The Church of Jesus Christ of Latter-day Saints titles
Preceded by Louie B. Felt	President of the Primary; October 8, 1925 –1939	Succeeded by May Green Hinckley
Preceded by Lillie T. Freeze	First Counselor in the general presidency of the Primary; 1905 – October 8, 1925	Succeeded by Sadie Grant Pack
