= Louie B. Felt =

American Mormon president (1850–1928)

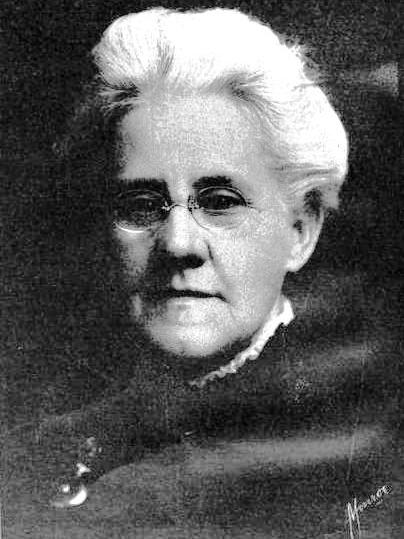

1st General President of the Primary
- June 19, 1880 – October 6, 1925
- Called by: John Taylor
- Successor: May Anderson

Personal details
- Born: Louie Bouton; May 5, 1850; South Norwalk, Connecticut, United States
- Died: February 13, 1928 (aged 77); Salt Lake City, Utah, United States
- Resting place: Salt Lake City Cemetery; 40.777°N 111.858°W
- Spouse(s): Joseph Felt
- Parents: Joseph Bouton; Mary Rebecca Barto

Sarah Louise "Louie" Bouton Felt (May 5, 1850 – February 13, 1928) was the first general president of the children's Primary organization of the Church of Jesus Christ of Latter-day Saints (LDS Church) between 1880 and 1925. She was the General Primary president for longer than any other president.

Louise Bouton was born in South Norwalk, Connecticut. She and her family were members of the LDS Church and moved to Utah Territory in 1866. Along the way, Bouton met Joseph Felt and after they married they were sent to live in Muddy River in an effort to settle the area. The settlement was not successful and they returned to live in Salt Lake City, where Felt was a stake young women's organization officer and ward Primary president. Encouraged by Louise, Joseph married two other women, and though Louise was unable to have children, she helped raise the children and grandchildren of her sister wives. In 1880, Felt was appointed as general Primary president in 1880, but was not involved in its administration until 1890. Felt and the members of the Primary raised funds for charity, for the initial publication of The Children's Friend, and for the construction and administration of the LDS Children's Convalescent Home and Day Nursery. Felt received training in Progressive education and used her knowledge to make changes to Primary curricula. She divided children into age groups and included stories, crafts, and games in lessons.

Felt was very close friends with her sister wives and the Primary secretary, May Anderson. Anderson lived in the same home as Felt and they shared a bedroom. Two Mormon historians speculate that their relationship may have been romantic, an argument partially based on florid descriptions of their love for one another published in The Children's Friend. Three other Mormon historians counter that such florid prose describing intimacy was normal for relationships between women in 19th-century America and assert that their relationship was platonic.

== Early life ==
Louise Bouton was born May 5, 1850, in South Norwalk, Connecticut. She was the third child of Joseph Bouton and Mary Rebecca Barto. Her parents had become members of The Church of Jesus Christ of Latter-day Saints several years before her birth. In 1864, the Bouton family started to travel to Utah Territory to join other Latter-day Saints there, but postponed their journey after all their possessions were destroyed in a baggage car fire on the way to Nebraska. They succeeded in 1866, and on the journey to Utah, Louise met Joseph H. Felt in Omaha. Because Joseph Bouton was ill, he and his family stayed in Omaha for six weeks. During that time Joseph Felt courted Louise, and they were married in Salt Lake City on December 24, 1866. Joseph Felt was the eldest son of Nathaniel H. Felt.

== Married life and sister wives ==
Brigham Young sent Felt and her husband to Muddy River in 1867, along with nine other young couples. They made their own adobe home, but due to severe weather and the remoteness of the area, they returned to Salt Lake City in 1869. In 1872, Felt used her inheritance to buy a house there. In the Salt Lake 11th Ward, Felt befriended Lillie Tuckett Freeze. Felt herself stated that Lillie Freeze and Mary Ann Freeze supported her spiritual development at the time. Mary Ann Freeze called Felt as the first counselor in the stake young women's organization and she became her ward's Primary president in 1878. Felt was unable to have children after a miscarriage from her time in Muddy River. She encouraged her husband to live the Latter-day Saint law of plural marriage. Joseph married Elizabeth Mineer in 1875 and Elizabeth Lidell in 1881. Felt helped look after and raise the children of these women. Elizabeth Lidell divorced Joseph Felt and moved to California with her children at some point.

During the government attempts to prosecute polygamists, Felt twice left Utah Territory to avoid testifying in court against Joseph. Felt's sister wife Elizabeth Mineer went into hiding, and Felt often arranged for Elizabeth to visit her children for a day, driving a disguised Elizabeth to their home in a cart in the middle of the night. Louie Felt Keysor, one of the daughters of Elizabeth Mineer, died, and Felt helped raise her four children. Joseph Felt served a mission in 1883 in the Indian Territories and again 1885–1887 in the Eastern States. After his return, he still traveled frequently in his work as a travelling salesman for ZCMI. Joseph Felt died in 1907. In 1918, Felt was described as having been an exemplary wife fulfilling the role of a helpmeet to man. At Felt's funeral she was described as being "devoted to her husband and to his children. She was a good house-keeper, a real home-maker. Her devotion to her husband was the kind that helped him to stand by his ideals of right."

== Service in the Primary Association ==
Eliza R. Snow, Presendia Kimball and Zina Young asked Felt to be the first general president of the Primary in May 1880. She was officially appointed at the June 1880 jubilee celebration at a meeting of the associations presided over by Eliza R. Snow, which at the time included the Primary and young women's organization as well as the Relief Society. After Snow's death in 1887, Felt took a more active role in leading the Primary. Felt led the first Primary general conference in 1889.

Not all wards held Primary classes, and those that did had poor attendance. Felt visited Primaries when invited, but had to use her husband's money to pay for her travel expenses, but she was not authorized to organize new Primaries. In 1888, Felt was sustained as General Primary President in General Conference. Lillie Tuckett Freeze was also sustained as her first counselor. May Anderson and Felt attended a training on kindergarten in 1895 and taught a progressive kindergarten class for four years to children ages three to six. Informed by this experience, they divided Primary classes in their local eleventh ward into three groups based on age, which increased attendance and decreased the number of children acting out. Felt suggested that other Primaries make similar divisions in their classes. The Primary general board made these class divisions a recommendation in 1898. Later, Felt made further divisions, dividing children into classes based on their age and groups based on their age grouping. Their lessons included stories, crafts, and games. Felt was often in poor health, and travel was difficult for her. In 1889, Felt rented her home to May Anderson's parents. During that year, Felt suffered from an illness, and May Anderson attended to her. At some point Felt appointed Anderson as the secretary to the Primary general board. While Anderson was an efficient organizer, Felt was a charismatic leader. Also in 1889, Felt held the first Primary worker conference to train Primary leaders. After the Free School Act of 1890 separated the LDS Church from public schooling, the LDS General Board of Education organized new after-school Sunday School classes for children, in addition to the Primary's lessons for children. For a time, these Sunday School classes for children competed with Primary classes for the attention of teachers and children.

The First Presidency denied the Primary general presidency's petition to publish a journal on grounds that it would be too expensive. Felt asked William A. Morton, a children's book writer, to publish several issues of The Primary Helper, but it only lasted for a few issues. In 1901 Joseph F. Smith approved a Primary publication as long as it avoided debt and the Primary board managed its publication. Felt borrowed money to publish the first issues, putting her home up for collateral. Felt went forward with publishing the magazine even though the staff in the printing office tried to dissuade her from trying. The Children's Friend contained information and lessons to help the children's teachers. The magazine paid for itself in the first year.

In 1902, the Primary general board held a conference for stake and ward officers in the Primary. Lillie T. Freeze and Josephine R. West were Felt's counselors that year. The Primary general board did not hold a conference in 1903 because of the cost, but held them annually in subsequent years. In 1913, the general board held a 6-week training for 130 women from stakes across North America received training in games, dances, and health curricula for children. In 1917, the Primary partnered with the Red Cross to help with the war effort, aiding in the supply of linens and other war necessities. Primary classes stopped meeting during the 1918 flu pandemic, and after they started meeting again, they raised over $4,000 in aid for Armenia, Syria, and Europe.

In 1921, Anderson and Felt visited convalescent hospitals in the eastern part of the United States to learn best practices. They were disappointed by the lack of innovation. They were responsible for the administration of the LDS Children's Convalescent Home and Day Nursery, which opened on May 11, 1922. Felt also instituted the beginning of annual reports from local units (1881), the establishment of the Primary Annual Fund (1902) and spread Primary groups into every stake and many missions of the church. On October 6, 1925, Felt stepped down as general president of the Primary due to failing health. Her first counselor and close friend May Anderson succeeded her. Felt died in Salt Lake City of a cerebral hemorrhage.

== Same-sex relationships ==
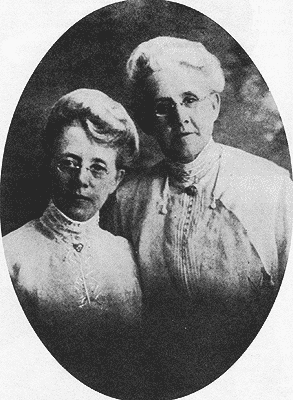
Louise Felt (right), and fellow church leader May Anderson (left), who were dedicated friends and companions. Anderson served on the Primary Board with Felt was her caregiver during times of ill health.

Felt had strong friendships with other women, especially her sister wives and the women she served with in the Primary leadership. D. Michael Quinn explained in his book on Mormon same-sex dynamics that same-sex Mormon friends often walked arm-in-arm, danced together, and kissed each other, as was accepted in 19th-century American culture. Writing for BYU Studies Quarterly, RoseAnn Benson noted that "florid expressions of love were part of Victorian prose and did not have the sexual overtones placed upon them by some today." According to a biographical sketch published in 1919 in Children's Friend, Felt "fell in love with" Lizzie Mineer in 1874, and encouraged her husband to marry her as a plural wife, in part to bring children into the family. In 1881, when Joseph married Elizabeth Liddell, Louise Felt "opened her home and shared her life and her love."

In 1883, Felt met May Anderson, and their friendship soon "ripened into love", according to an anonymous biographical sketch of Anderson in The Children's Friend. The same sketch described their new relationship as devoted, stating "there never were more ardent lovers than these two." Though acknowledging a lack of direct proof, Quinn and O'Donovan speculate that Felt and Anderson could have been romantic partners. At the FARMS Review of Books, George L. Mitton and Rhett S. James argue that Quinn inaccurately classifies Felt's relationships with other women as romantic.

Joseph Felt did not marry Anderson, but in 1889, at a time when Lousie Felt was ill, May moved in to Felt's home. As a polygamist, Joseph had two houses, and it is unclear where he spent most of his time. Quinn stated that Joseph lived in his other home after May moved in. Mitton and James argue that the actual living arrangements of Joseph Felt are difficult to verify because after the 1890 Manifesto polygamous families often sought to obscure their living arrangements. After Joseph's death in 1907, Felt and Anderson continued to live together, sleeping in the same bedroom until a few years before Felt was released as Primary president in 1925, when Anderson moved out. They were referred to by others as the "David and Jonathan of the Primary", a term they embraced. According to Mitton and James, David and Jonathan's relationship in the Bible was not interpreted as a sexual relationship by the LDS Church, but as one of fraternal love.

== See also ==
- Homosexuality and The Church of Jesus Christ of Latter-day Saints
- Clara W. Beebe
- Matilda M. Barratt

== Notes ==
The Church of Jesus Christ of Latter-day Saints titles
First	President of the Primary; June 19, 1880 – October 6, 1925	Succeeded by May Anderson
