= Lynn S. Richards =

American politician (1901–2001)

Lynn S. Richards (February 3, 1901 – May 26, 2001) was a Utah lawyer, politician, and a leader in the Church of Jesus Christ of Latter-day Saints (LDS Church).

Richards was born in Salt Lake City to Irene Merrill and Stephen L Richards. He attended LDS High School and as a young man was an LDS Church missionary in the Eastern States Mission. He graduated from Brigham Young University in 1925 and afterwards received a law degree from Stanford Law School. He practiced law in Salt Lake City for 72 years (1929 to 2001).

Richards was elected to the Utah State Senate as a Democrat in 1942. He was a member of the Utah Board of Education for 15 years, including two years as its chairman.

In the LDS Church, Richards was a bishop in Salt Lake's University Ward and the Federal Heights Ward. In 1952, he was selected to be the Second Assistant to George R. Hill in the general superintendency of the Deseret Sunday School Union. In 1966, David Lawrence McKay succeeded Hill as general superintendent, and McKay selected Richards as his First Assistant. Richards served as First Assistant in the Sunday School until the superintendency was released in 1971.

Richards married Lucille Covey in 1924; they were the parents of six children. Richards lived to age 100 and died in Salt Lake City.
