= Derek A. Cuthbert =

First Quorum of the Seventy
- 1 April 1978 (aged 51) – 7 April 1991 (aged 64)
- Called by: Spencer W. Kimball

Personal details
- Born: Derek Alfred Cuthbert; 5 October 1926; Sherwood, England, United Kingdom
- Died: 7 April 1991 (aged 64); Salt Lake City, Utah, United States
- Spouse(s): Muriel Olive Mason
- Children: 10

Derek Alfred Cuthbert (5 October 1926 – 7 April 1991) was a general authority of the Church of Jesus Christ of Latter-day Saints (LDS Church) from 1978 until his death. He was the first resident of the United Kingdom to be called as an LDS Church general authority.

== Early life ==
Cuthbert was born in Sherwood, a suburb of Nottingham, England. He attended Nottingham High School and then studied at the University of London. He was trained in the Japanese language and was a member of the Royal Air Force (RAF). He was sent to Burma and arrived there about the end of the Second World War. He later served in Hong Kong and India and in the Air Ministry headquarters in England.

Cuthbert married Muriel Olive Mason. They had ten children.

After leaving the RAF in 1948, Cuthbert studied at the University of Nottingham. He received a degree in law and economics and then worked for a major chemical company.

== LDS Church ==
Cuthbert was involved in the Church of England as he grew up. After meeting the LDS Church missionaries in 1950, Cuthbert and his wife were baptized into the church in 1951.

Cuthbert helped establish Deseret Enterprises, an agency that directed the distribution of materials for the LDS Church in Britain and on the European continent. In 1961, he became the first president of the church's Leicester Stake. He also served as the first president of the Birmingham England Stake when it was organized in 1969. He was then called as a regional representative. While serving in this position, Cuthbert was one of the planners for the 1971 Manchester Area Conference.

From 1975 to 1978, Cuthbert was president of the church's Scotland Edinburgh Mission. During his presidency, 35 new wards and branches were organized.

Cuthbert became a member of the church's First Quorum of the Seventy in 1978. He supervised the church in many areas. From 1988 until 1991, Cuthbert served as a counselor to Robert L. Simpson, and then Hugh W. Pinnock in the General Presidency of the church's Sunday School. Cuthbert died during the church's general conference in 1991.
