= Poelman =

Poelman is a Dutch toponymic surname that translates to "pool man", originally referring to a person who lived near a small lake. The name is most common in the provinces of Drenthe and Groninegen. Alternative spellings include Poelmann and Poelmans. The name may refer to:

- Anette Poelman (1853–1914), Dutch suffragist and philanthropist
- Anne Osborn Poelman (born 1943), American medical doctor
- Frits Poelman, New Zealand football defender
- Jacqueline Poelman (born 1973), Dutch sprinter
- Ronald E. Poelman (1928–2011), American Mormon leader
- Simon Poelman (born 1963), New Zealand decathlete

Poelmann

- Boudewijn Poelmann (born 1949), Dutch businessman

Poelmans

- Edgard Poelmans (1883–1932), Belgian football defender
- Joeri Poelmans (born 1995), Belgian football defender
- Kim Poelmans (born 1977), Belgian singer

== See also ==
- Polman, Dutch surname of the same origin
