= List of Stanford Law School alumni =

The following is an incomplete list of alumni of Stanford Law School.

== Law and government ==
=== United States government ===
==== Executive branch ====
- David L. Anderson (1990), United States Attorney for the Northern District of California
- William Baer (1975), Assistant Attorney General for the Antitrust Division, United States Department of Justice
- Xavier Becerra (1984), 25th U.S. Secretary of Health and Human Services (2021–present), Attorney General of California (2017–2021) U.S. congressman (1993–2017)
- Geoffrey Berman (1984), United States Attorney for the Southern District of New York
- Joshua B. Bolten (1980), White House Chief of Staff (2006–2009)
- Brooksley Born (1964), former chair of the Commodity Futures Trading Commission
- Warren Christopher (1949), 63rd U.S. Secretary of State
- Nelson Cunningham, cofounder of Kissinger Associates, former Special Advisor to the President for Western Hemisphere affairs
- Fred Dutton (1949), Special Assistant to U.S. President John F. Kennedy, managed Robert F. Kennedy's presidential campaign
- John Ehrlichman (1951), infamous figure in the Watergate scandal
- Ivan K. Fong (1987), general counsel of the Department of Homeland Security
- David J. Hayes (1978), Deputy Secretary and Chief Operating Officer of the U.S. Department of the Interior
- Roderick M. Hills (1955), former chairman of the U.S. Securities and Exchange Commission (1975–1977) and cofounder of Munger, Tolles & Olson
- Shirley Hufstedler (1949), first U.S. Secretary of Education (1979–1981) and Judge of the Ninth Circuit Court of Appeals (1968–1979)
- Robert K. Hur (2001), United States Attorney for the District of Maryland
- Reuben Jeffery III, Under Secretary for Economic, Business, and Agricultural Affairs at the U.S. Department of State and former chairman of the Commodities Futures Trading Commission
- Peter Koski (2005), United States Department of Justice trial attorney
- Carol Lam (1985), former United States Attorney for the Southern District of California
- Michelle Kwok Lee (1992), Under Secretary of Commerce for Intellectual Property and Director of the United States Patent and Trademark Office
- Cheryl Mills (1990), Chief of Staff to U.S. Secretary of State Hillary Clinton
- Wendy J. Olson (1990), United States Attorney for the District of Idaho
- Robert S. Rivkin, 21st general counsel of the U.S. Department of Transportation
- John Roos (1980), United States Ambassador to Japan (2009–2013)
- Tony West (1992), Associate Attorney General of the United States

==== Legislative branch ====
- Max Baucus (1967), U.S. senator (1978–2014) and former U.S. Ambassador to China
- Jeff Bingaman (1968), U.S. senator (1983–2013)
- Frank Church (1950), U.S. senator (1957–1981)
- William Donlon Edwards (1939), U.S. congressman (1963–1995)
- Pablo Hernández Rivera (2017), resident commissioner of Puerto Rico (2025–present)
- Ernest McFarland (1922), U.S. senator (1941–1953)
- Charles M. Teague (1934), U.S. congressman (1955–1974)

==== Judicial branch ====
===== Supreme Court =====
- Sandra Day O'Connor (1952), first female U.S. Supreme Court justice (1981–2006)
- William Rehnquist (1952), 16th Chief Justice of the United States (1986–2005), associate justice of the Supreme Court (1972–1986)

===== Courts of appeals =====
- Carlos Bea (1958), judge of the Ninth Circuit Court of Appeals
- Richard Harvey Chambers (1932), judge of the Ninth Circuit Court of Appeals
- Daniel P. Collins (1988), judge of the Ninth Circuit Court of Appeals
- Benjamin Cushing Duniway (1931), judge of the Ninth Circuit Court of Appeals
- Raymond C. Fisher (1966), judge of the Ninth Circuit Court of Appeals
- Michelle Friedland (2000), judge of the Ninth Circuit Court of Appeals
- Britt Grant (2007), judge of the Eleventh Circuit Court of Appeals
- Cynthia Holcomb Hall (1954), judge of the Ninth Circuit Court of Appeals
- Procter R. Hug, Jr. (1958), judge and former chief judge of the Ninth Circuit Court of Appeals
- Gilbert H. Jertberg (1922), judge of the Ninth Circuit Court of Appeals
- Cheryl Ann Krause (1993), judge of the Third Circuit Court of Appeals
- Steven Menashi (2008), judge of the Second Circuit Court of Appeals
- Justin Miller (1914), judge of the Court of Appeals for the District of Columbia Circuit
- William Albert Norris (1954), judge of the Ninth Circuit Court of Appeals
- John B. Owens (1996), judge of the Ninth Circuit Court of Appeals
- Florence Y. Pan (1993), judge of the Court of Appeals for the District of Columbia Circuit
- Peter J. Phipps (1998), judge of the Third Circuit Court of Appeals
- Pamela Ann Rymer (1964), judge of the Ninth Circuit Court of Appeals
- Sri Srinivasan (1995), judge of the Court of Appeals for the District of Columbia Circuit

===== District courts =====
- Wayne Alley (1957), judge of the Western District of Oklahoma
- D. Brook Bartlett (1962), judge of the Western District of Missouri
- Jesus Bernal (1989), judge of the Central District of California
- Rudi M. Brewster (1960), judge of the Southern District of California
- Paul G. Cassell (1984), judge of the District of Utah
- Deborah K. Chasanow (1974), judge of the District of Maryland
- Samuel Conti (1948), judge of the Northern District of California
- Christopher Reid Cooper (1993), judge of the District of Columbia
- Walter Early Craig (1934), judge of the District of Arizona
- James Donato (1988), judge of the Northern District of California
- Gary Feinerman (1991), judge of the Northern District of Illinois
- Haywood Stirling Gilliam, Jr. (1994), judge of the Northern District of California
- Joan B. Gottschall (1973), judge of the Northern District of Illinois
- Thomas Poole Griesa (1958), judge of the Southern District of New York
- Harry Lindley Hupp (1955), judge of the Central District of California
- Susan Yvonne Illston (1973), judge of the Northern District of California
- Rachel Kovner (2006), judge of the Eastern District of New York
- Fred Kunzel (1927), judge of the Southern District of California
- Charles A. Legge (1954), judge of the Northern District of California
- Lawrence Tupper Lydick (1942), judge of the Central District of California
- Brian Morris (1992), judge of the District of Montana
- Kimberly J. Mueller (1995), judge of the Eastern District of California
- S. James Otero (1976), judge of the Central District of California
- Halil Suleyman Ozerden (1998), judge of the Southern District of Mississippi
- Robert Francis Peckham (1945), judge of the Northern District of California
- John Rolly Ross (1926), judge of the District of Nevada
- James V. Selna (1970), judge of the Central District of California
- Fern M. Smith (1975), judge of the Northern District of California
- Christina A. Snyder (1972), judge of the Central District of California
- Gus Jerome Solomon (1929), judge of the District of Oregon
- Sunshine Sykes (2001), judge of the Central District of California
- Bruce Rutherford Thompson (1936), judge of the District of Nevada
- Vaughn R. Walker (1970), judge of the Northern District of California
- James Ware (1972), judge of the Northern District of California
- Stanley Alexander Weigel (1928), judge of the Northern District of California
- David Keith Winder (1958), judge of the District of Utah

=== State judiciary ===
- Barbara Durham (1968), chief justice of the Washington Supreme Court (1995–1998)
- Ronald M. George (1964), chief justice of California (1996–2011)
- Elizabeth A. Grimes, associate justice of the California Second District Court of Appeal, Division Eight
- Patricia Guerrero (1997), associate justice of the Supreme Court of California (2022–present)
- Rhoda V. Lewis (1929), associate justice of the Hawaii Supreme Court and first woman to serve on the court (1959–1967)
- Carlos R. Moreno (1975), associate justice of the Supreme Court of California (2001–2011)
- Frank K. Richardson (1938), associate justice of the Supreme Court of California (1974–1983)
- Homer R. Spence (1915), associate justice of the Supreme Court of California (1945–1960)
- Delbert E. Wong (1949), first Chinese-American judge in the continental United States

=== Non-United States government ===
- Chen Show Mao (1992), Member of Parliament, Singapore
- Sian Elias (JSM 1972), Chief Justice of New Zealand
- Ronald Kenneth Noble (1982), Secretary General of Interpol and law professor

=== Other government ===
- Mark Brewer (1983), chair of the Michigan Democratic Party
- Dana K. Chipman (1986), Judge Advocate General of the United States Army
- Chelsea Cook, City Councillor for Durham, North Carolina
- Edward C. DuMont (1986), Solicitor General of California
- Matt Gonzalez (1990), Ralph Nader's 2008 vice presidential running mate, former president of San Francisco Board of Supervisors
- Charles F. Lettow (1968), judge of the United States Court of Federal Claims
- Dick Murphy, 33rd mayor of San Diego, California
- Jenifer Rajkumar (2008), current District Leader in Lower Manhattan and candidate for the New York State Assembly's 65th District
- Chuck Reed (1978), mayor of San Jose, California
- Gordon Rosenmeier (1932), former Minnesota State Senator
- William A. Sutherland (1898), former California State Assemblyman
- John Van de Kamp (1959), 28th Attorney General of California

== Academia ==
- Kerry Abrams (1998), dean of Duke University Law School
- Michelle Alexander (1992), associate professor of law at Ohio State University and author of The New Jim Crow
- H. Verlan Andersen (1946), former professor of law and business at Brigham Young University
- Douglas G. Baird, professor of law and former dean at the University of Chicago Law School
- Stuart Banner, legal historian and professor of law at the UCLA School of Law
- Bernard Bell, professor of law at Rutgers School of Law–Newark
- Lillian BeVier, constitutional law scholar and professor emerita at the University of Virginia Law School
- Brian W. Casey, president of Colgate University and former associate dean for academic affairs at Harvard University
- Cara H. Drinan, professor of law at The Catholic University of America's Columbus School of Law
- Aaron Edlin, scholar of law and economics; professor of economics at the University of California, Berkeley
- Lia Epperson, civil rights lawyer; professor of law at American University Washington College of Law
- Robin Feldman, legal scholar and professor of law at UC Hastings College of Law
- Laura E. Gomez, former president of the Law and Society Association and law professor at the UCLA School of Law
- Joseph Grundfest, scholar of corporate law, corporate governance, securities regulation, and professor at Stanford Law School
- Chris Guthrie (1994), dean of Vanderbilt University Law School
- Gillian K. Hadfield, professor of law and economics at the University of Southern California
- Michael Heller, real estate law scholar and professor of law at Columbia Law School
- C. Scott Hemphill, antitrust and intellectual property scholar and professor of law at New York University Law School
- Daniel P. Kessler (1993), health law scholar and professor at Stanford Law School and Stanford Business School
- Michael Klarman (1983), constitutional law scholar and Harvard Law School professor
- Gillian Lester (1998), dean of Columbia Law School
- David F. Levi (1980), former dean of Duke University Law School and former Judge of the Eastern District of California
- Sanford Levinson, constitutional law scholar and professor of law at the University of Texas School of Law
- Bernadette Meyler, constitutional law scholar and professor of law at Stanford Law School
- Naomi Mezey, civil procedure scholar and professor of law at Georgetown University Law Center
- Antony Page (1997), dean of the Florida International University College of Law
- Nathaniel Persily, election law and constitutional law scholar and professor at Stanford Law School
- Gary R. Roberts, professor of law and former dean of the Indiana University Robert H. McKinney School of Law
- Catherine Sandoval (1990), professor at Santa Clara University School of Law and first Hispanic commissioner in the California Public Utilities Commission
- Gregory Shaffer, international trade law scholar and law professor at the University of California, Irvine School of Law
- Norman Spaulding, civil procedure scholar and professor of law at Stanford Law School
- Richard Harold Steinberg, international law scholar and professor of law at the UCLA School of Law
- Allen S. Weiner, international legal scholar and co-director of the Stanford Center on International Conflict and Negotiation at Stanford Law School
- Robert Weisberg, criminal law scholar and professor of law at Stanford Law School
- Paul R. Williams, president of the Public International Law & Policy Group and law professor at the American University Washington College of Law
- Kimberly Yuracko (1998), professor at Northwestern University Pritzker School of Law and former dean
- Graham J. Zellick CBE QC, Ford Foundation Fellow (1970–71), vice chancellor of the University of London (1997–2003)

== Activism ==
- Maya Harris (1992), vice president for Peace and Social Justice at the Ford Foundation
- Denis Hayes (1985), founder, Earth Day Network
- Edward Michael Keating (1950), newspaper publisher, journalist, author; founder and publisher of Ramparts; activist within the New Left movement
- Rebecca Love Kourlis (1976), executive director at the Institute for the Advancement of the American Legal System
- Greg Lukianoff, president of the Foundation for Individual Rights in Education (FIRE)
- Anthony Romero (1990), executive director of the American Civil Liberties Union (2001–present)
- Marc Rotenberg, president and executive director of the Electronic Privacy Information Center
- John D. Trasviña (1983), president of the Mexican American Legal Defense and Education Fund (MALDEF)

== Business ==
- Chuck Armstrong (1967), president of the Seattle Mariners
- Michael Arrington (1995), Internet journalist and entrepreneur
- Riley Bechtel (1977), billionaire, chairman and CEO, Bechtel Corporation
- Orlando Bravo (1997), billionaire, co-founder and managing partner of private equity firm Thoma Bravo
- James Crown (1980), president of Henry Crown and Company
- David C. Drummond (1985), senior vice president, Corporate Development and chief legal officer of Google
- Bill Franke (1961), chairman of Wizz Air and Frontier Airlines
- Joel Greenblatt (1981, dropped out), hedge fund manager and Co-Chief Investment Officer of Gotham Asset Management
- Larry Irving, former vice president of Global Government Affairs for the Hewlett-Packard Company and president and CEO of the Irving Information Group
- Richard Jencks, television executive and counsel, former president of CBS Broadcast Group
- Alex Karp (1992), billionaire and co-founder of Palantir Technologies
- Daniel Lubetzky (1993), billionaire and co-founder of Kind
- William Neukom (1967), first general counsel at Microsoft, president of the American Bar Association
- Daniel Ninivaggi (1991), CEO of Lordstown Motors and chairman of Garrett Motion, former CEO of Icahn Enterprises
- Mark Oldman, cofounder of Vault.com and wine critic
- Penny Pritzker (1984), billionaire and CEO of Pritzker Realty
- Peter Thiel (1992), founder of PayPal
- Fred von Lohmann, Senior Copyright Counsel at Google
- Kent Walker (1987), President of Global Affairs and Chief Legal Officer at Google
- Dennis Woodside (1995), COO of Dropbox

== Media and journalism ==
- Raymond Bonner (1967), investigative reporter for The New York Times and the International Herald Tribune
- Amanda Brown, author of Legally Blonde
- Ailsa Chang, journalist for NPR and a host of All Things Considered
- Robert Cochran (1974), creator of the television shows 24 and La Femme Nikita
- Jami Floyd (1996), broadcast journalist and legal analyst, host of All Things Considered for WNYC New York Public Radio
- Christy Haubegger (1992), founder of Latina magazine and film producer
- Dahlia Lithwick (1995), senior editor at Slate
- David Margolick, contributing editor at Condé Nast Portfolio, former contributing editor at Vanity Fair
- Twist Phelan, author
- Carlos Watson (1995), television host and journalist
- Katharine Weymouth (1992), publisher of The Washington Post
- Michael G. Wilson (1966), producer of James Bond films

== Other ==
- H. Verlan Andersen (1946), former member of the Utah State Legislature and former member of the First Quorum of the Seventy of the Church of Jesus Christ of Latter-day Saints (LDS Church)
- Quentin L. Cook (1966), member of the Quorum of the Twelve Apostles of the Church of Jesus Christ of Latter-day Saints (LDS Church)
- Prentis Cobb Hale (1936), President of the Organizing Committee for the 1960 Winter Olympics
- Harry Usher, general manager of the Los Angeles Olympic Organizing Committee
- Bill Walton (never graduated), former NBA basketball player
- W. Richard West, Jr. (1971), founding director of the Smithsonian National Museum of the American Indian
- Lance B. Wickman (1972), general counsel of the Church of Jesus Christ of Latter-day Saints (LDS Church)
