= George Pyper =

George Pyper may refer to:

- George D. Pyper, American leader of the Church of Jesus Christ of Latter-day Saints
- George W. Pyper, American screenwriter
