= H. Verlan Andersen =

American professor and LDS Church official (1914–1992)

First Quorum of the Seventy
- April 5, 1986 – April 1, 1989
- Called by: Ezra Taft Benson
- End reason: Transferred to Second Quorum of the Seventy

Second Quorum of the Seventy
- April 1, 1989 – October 5, 1991
- Called by: Ezra Taft Benson
- End reason: Honorably released

Personal details
- Born: Hans Verlan Andersen; November 6, 1914; Logan, Utah, United States
- Died: July 16, 1992 (aged 77); Orem, Utah, United States
- Alma mater: Brigham Young University (B.S.); Stanford University Law School (L.L.B.); Harvard University Law School (L.L.M.)

Hans Verlan Andersen (November 6, 1914 – July 16, 1992) was a general authority of the Church of Jesus Christ of Latter-day Saints (LDS Church) and a professor at Brigham Young University (BYU).

Andersen was called to the LDS Church's First Quorum of the Seventy in April 1986. On April 1, 1989 he was transferred to the newly created Second Quorum of the Seventy. On October 5, 1991, he was released from service as a general authority. He died of cancer on July 16, 1992.

== Early life and education ==
Andersen was born on November 6, 1914, in Logan, Utah to Hans Andersen and Mynoa Richardson. His father was a Mexican immigrant to the US, who was born in Galeana Chihuahua Mexico in 1886 and then died in Virden, New Mexico in May 1940. Andersen spent his earliest years on a dry farm in Blue Creek, Utah. He was baptized by his father on May 6, 1923, and the next year his family moved to Virden, New Mexico to be closer to his Andersen and Richardson grandparents in the Gila Valley. His paternal grandfather, Andrew Andersen, was from Otterup, Denmark and his paternal grandmother, Janet Henderson, was from Haddington, Scotland. His paternal grandparents emigrated to America after joining the LDS Church. After living in Mexico, Andrew and Janet settled in Virden, where Andersen's parents, Hans and Mynoa, moved the family in 1923-24. Andersen grew up working on the family farm.

Andersen graduated high school in September 1933 and then received a call to serve a mission in the church's North Central States Mission, which included Minnesota, along with North and South Dakota. After returning home in October 1935, he enrolled at Gila Junior College (previously the St. Joseph Stake Academy, now Eastern Arizona College) where he was president of the sophomore class. He graduated in 1937.

Andersen was ordained a seventy by Melvin J. Ballard of the Quorum of the Twelve Apostles in 1936. He enrolled at BYU in the fall of 1938 and graduated in June 1940 with a bachelor's degree in accounting, one month after his father died from cancer. After his father's death, he helped his mother and younger siblings move from New Mexico to Mesa, Arizona. After one load of furniture and family genealogy had been taken to Mesa, the family's home, belongings, and farm were destroyed in the Gila River flood of September 1941. Andersen worked for the Harmon Audit Company in Phoenix and Prescott from 1940 to 1942 and then moved back to Mesa in the summer of 1942, where he took a job with a local CPA firm. In January 1943, he met Shirley Hoyt at a conference of the church's Maricopa Arizona Stake. They were married in the Salt Lake Temple on June 15, 1943 by Thomas E. McKay.

The Andersens continued to live in Arizona until they moved to Palo Alto, California in the fall of 1944 where Andersen attended law school at Stanford University. He received the Henry Newell Scholarship, and graduated in 1946 with an LL.B. degree and Order of the Coif honors. Starting January 1, 1946, he worked for Wayne Mayhew and Co. in San Francisco until he was recruited to teach law and accounting at BYU in the fall of 1946. He left teaching at BYU after one year to attend Harvard Law School, where he earned an LL.M. degree in 1948.

== Professional career ==
After law school, Andersen set up a law and accounting practice in Phoenix and worked there until accepting another invitation to teach law and business at BYU starting in the fall of 1953. Except for a brief stint in Phoenix from 1962 to 1965, Andersen was a professor of accounting at BYU until 1981 during the administrations of Ernest L. Wilkinson and Dallin H. Oaks.

When Brigham Young High School closed in 1968, Andersen met with a group of other BYU professors and parents with the intent of establishing a private school. They desired to have their children's academic learning enhanced and enlightened by principles of morality, religion, liberty and patriotism. The founders purchased an LDS Church meetinghouse in Pleasant Grove, Utah, and opened the American Heritage School (AHS) in 1970 with 80 students enrolled. As of 2023, AHS has roughly one thousand students and had Oaks deliver its commencement address in both 2011 and 2021.

From 1969 to 1973, Andersen served in the Utah State Legislature.

== LDS Church service ==
After retiring from BYU, Andersen and his wife were called as church service missionaries: first in Buenos Aires, Argentina and then in Lima, Peru. In April 1986, Andersen was called as a general authority and member of the church's First Quorum of the Seventy. From 1986 to 1989, Andersen served as a member of the presidency of the church's Mexico and Central America Area. In 1989, the Andersens returned to Argentina when he was assigned to the South America South Area. On October 7, 1990, he was sustained as second counselor in the general presidency of the church's Sunday School, while also serving in the presidency of the Utah Central Area. On January 1, 1991, he began serving as first counselor to Hugh W. Pinnock in the Sunday School General Presidency. Upon returning to Utah, he was diagnosed with cancer. In the church's October 1991 general conference, Andersen was released as a general authority and gave his final conference address. He died of cancer on July 16, 1992.

== Political views ==
Andersen was a supporter of the original intent of the U.S. Constitution and was critical of unconstitutional government. As he explained in his first book:

As originally interpreted, the United States Constitution denied government the right to regulate and control the citizen in the use of his property. Over the years the commerce clause and the general welfare clause have been so interpreted as to permit both the state and Federal governments to regiment labor, agriculture, manufacturing, transportation, communication, finance and all other forms of economic activity. Today, if there is any limit on the power of government to regulate, no one knows what that limit is (Many Are Called But Few Are Chosen, p.45).

== Anecdote ==
Andersen is probably most well-known to Latter-day Saints by the following story, told by Thomas S. Monson, that speaks of Andersen's strict devotion to keeping the commandments.

At the funeral service of a noble General Authority, H. Verlan Andersen, a tribute was expressed by a son. He related that, years earlier, he had a special school date on a Saturday night. He borrowed from his father the family car. As he obtained the car keys and headed for the door, his father said, "Remember, tomorrow is Sunday. The car will need more gas before then. Be sure to fill the tank before coming home."

Elder Andersen's son then related that the evening activity was wonderful. Friends met, refreshments were served, and all had a good time. In his exuberance, however, he failed to follow his father's instruction and add fuel to the car's tank before returning home. He simply forgot.

Sunday morning dawned. Elder Andersen discovered the gas gauge showed empty. The son saw his father put the car keys on the table. In the Andersen family the Sabbath day was a day for worship and thanksgiving, and not for purchases.

As the funeral message continued, Elder Andersen's son declared, "I saw my father put on his coat, bid us good-bye, and walk the long distance to the chapel, that he might attend an early meeting." Duty called. Truth was not held hostage to expedience.

In concluding his funeral message, Elder Andersen's son said, "No son ever was taught more effectively by his father than I was on that occasion. My father not only knew the truth, but he also taught the truth and lived the truth."

== Published works ==
- Many Are Called But Few Are Chosen
- The Book of Mormon and the Constitution
- The Moral Basis of a Free Society

== Bibliography ==
- Lambert, Bruce (July 18, 1992). "Prof. H. Verlan Andersen, 77; A Leader in the Mormon Church". The New York Times.
