= Anne Osbourn (disambiguation) =

Anne Osbourn may refer to:

- Anne Osbourn, professor of biology
- Anne G. Osborn, American physician
- Anne Osborn Krueger (born 1934), American economist, deputy director of the IMF
