= William Oswald =

William Oswald may refer to:

- William D. Oswald (born 1936), leader in The Church of Jesus Christ of Latter-day Saints
- William J. Oswald (1919–2005), American scientist and educator

== See also ==
- Bill Oswalt
