= A. Theodore Tuttle =

American Mormon leader (1919–1986)

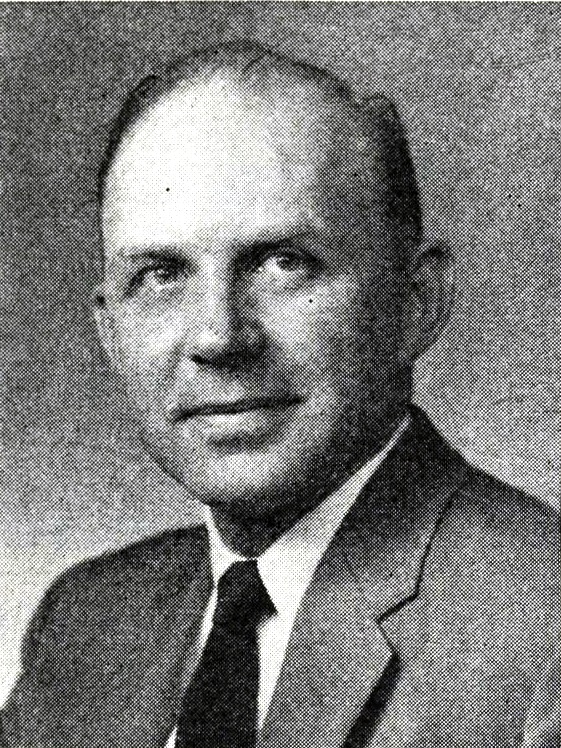

Presidency of the First Quorum of the Seventy
- October 1, 1976 – February 22, 1980
- Called by: Spencer W. Kimball
- End reason: Honorably Released

First Quorum of the Seventy
- October 1, 1976 – November 28, 1986
- Called by: Spencer W. Kimball

First Council of the Seventy
- April 4, 1958 – October 1, 1976
- Called by: David O. McKay
- End reason: Position Abolished

Personal details
- Born: Albert Theodore Tuttle; March 2, 1919; Manti, Utah, United States
- Died: November 28, 1986 (aged 67); Salt Lake City, Utah, United States
- Cause of death: Cancer
- Resting place: Mountain View Memorial Estates; 40.6094°N 111.8040°W
- Spouse(s): Marne Whitaker
- Children: 7

Albert Theodore Tuttle (March 2, 1919 – November 28, 1986) was an American general authority of the Church of Jesus Christ of Latter-day Saints (LDS Church) from 1958 until his death.

Tuttle was born in Manti, Utah. As a young man, he served as a missionary for the LDS Church in the Northern States Mission. He began his college education at Snow College and after his mission received a bachelor's degree from Brigham Young University and a master's degree from Stanford University. He later did graduate studies at the University of Utah. During World War II, Tuttle served two-and-a-half years as a Marine Corps line officer in the Pacific theater. He played an active part in the famous Raising of the Flag on Iwo Jima. Prior to his call as a general authority, Tuttle worked as a teacher and administrator in the Church Educational System. He was a seminary teacher and principal at several locations in Utah. He was later the director of the Institute of Religion in Reno, Nevada, and from 1953 until his call as a general authority was the head of the church's seminary and institute program.

Tuttle and his wife, Marne Whitaker, were the parents of seven children.

Tuttle became a member of the seven-man First Council of the Seventy in 1958. In 1976, he joined the newly reconstituted First Quorum of the Seventy and became a member of the Presidency of the Seventy, where he remained until 1980. From 1980 to 1982, Tuttle was president of the church's Provo Temple. In 1986, he became the second counselor to Robert L. Simpson in the church's Sunday School general presidency, but only held this position for a few months before his death.

Tuttle died of cancer in Salt Lake City, Utah.
