= Daniel K. Judd =

American educator and religious leader (born 1956)

Daniel K Judd
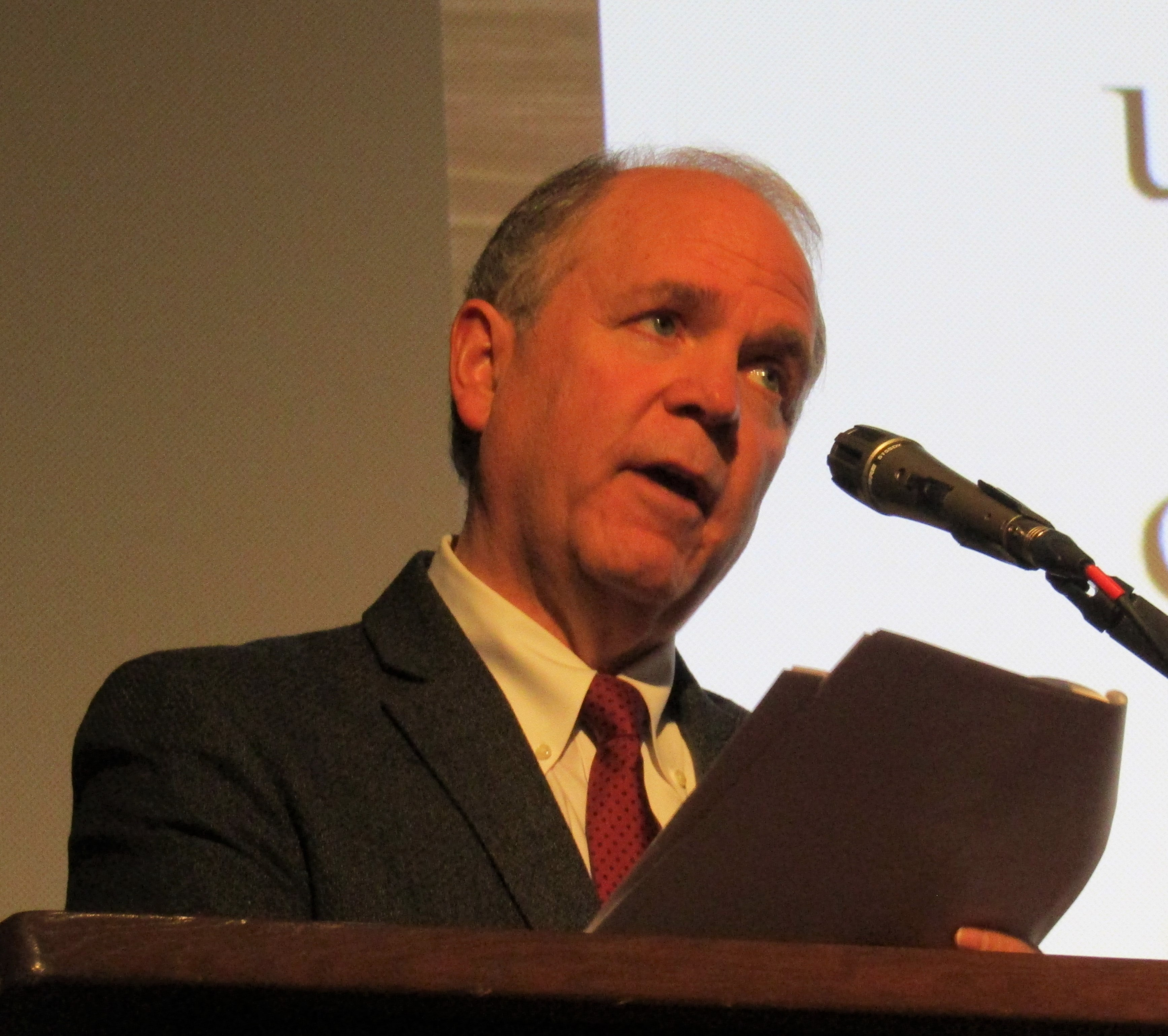
- Born: September 17, 1956 (age 70); Kanab, Utah, U.S.
- Spouse: Kaye Seegmiller
- Children: 4

Academic background
- Education: Southern Utah University (BS); Brigham Young University (MS, PhD)

Academic work
- Discipline: Family science · counseling psychology · religious studies
- Sub-discipline: Family counseling · Mormon studies · scripture studies
- Institutions: Brigham Young University; Brigham Young University–Idaho

Daniel K Judd (born September 17, 1956) is an American educator and religious leader who served as first counselor to A. Roger Merrill in the Sunday School General Presidency of the Church of Jesus Christ of Latter-day Saints (LDS Church) from 2004 to 2009. From 2019 to 2021, Judd was dean of Brigham Young University's (BYU) Department of Religious Education. He had previously served as chair of BYU's Ancient Scripture Department.

== Birth and education ==
Born in Kanab, Utah, Judd earned a degree in zoology from Southern Utah University, followed by a Master of Science in family science and a PhD in counseling psychology from BYU.

== Career ==
In the mid-1970s, Judd served as a missionary for the LDS Church in the California San Diego Mission. Prior to his call to the Sunday School General Presidency, Judd was president of the church's Orem Utah Canyon View Stake.

Judd was a teacher in the church's Seminaries and Institutes of Religion in Utah, Arizona, and Michigan. He was also a professor of family sciences at Brigham Young University–Idaho. Judd is the author or editor of several books including Religion, Mental Health, and the Latter-day Saints (Bookcraft, 1999); Taking Sides: Clashing Views on Controversial Issues in Religion (McGraw-Hill Dushkin, 2003; and "The Fortunate Fall: Understanding the Blessings and Burdens of Adversity" (Deseret Book, 2011).

From 2011 to 2014, Judd served as president of the church's Ghana Accra Mission.

== Personal life ==
Judd married Kaye Seegmiller in the St. George Temple and they are the parents of four children.

== See also ==
- William D. Oswald

== Selected speeches ==
- "Religion, Mental Health, and the Latter-day Saints" – Devotional address given at Brigham Young University on July 18, 2006
- "A Wonderful Flood of Light" – Devotional address given at Brigham Young University on December 7, 2004
