= Clinton L. Cutler =

Clinton Louis Cutler (December 27, 1929 – April 9, 1994) was a general authority of the Church of Jesus Christ of Latter-day Saints (LDS Church) from 1990 until his death. He was a member of the Second Quorum of the Seventy and was a counselor in the church's Sunday School General Presidency.

Cutler was born in Salt Lake City, Utah, and received his college education at Utah State University and the University of Utah. He then worked for many years for the company that became US West Communications. He was an assistant vice president when he retired in 1986.

Prior to becoming a general authority, Cutler served in the LDS Church as president of the Washington Seattle Mission, regional representative, president of the Littleton Colorado Stake (beginning at its creation in 1973, president of the Boise Idaho West Stake, and bishop. Cutler was second counselor in the Sunday School General Presidency from October 1991 to August 1992 and was first counselor from August 1992 until his death.
