= A. Hamer Reiser =

American lawyer (1897–1981)

Albert Hamer Reiser
- Title: Secretary to the General Superintendency of the Deseret Sunday School Union, First Assistant to the General Superintendent of the Sunday School, President of the British Mission, Assistant Secretary to the First Presidency, President of the Sugar House Stake

Personal life
- Born: 31 August 1897 Salt Lake City, Utah, U.S.
- Died: 25 April 1981 (aged 83) Salt Lake City, Utah, U.S.
- Spouse: Elizabeth R. Baxter (m. 1920)
- Children: 8
- Parent(s): Albert S. Reiser; Nancy Ellen Hamer
- Notable work(s): Books and lesson manuals for Sunday School, history of the LDS Church for children (1945)
- Education: University of Utah
- Known for: Community leader in Utah, missionary; leader in the Sunday School organization of the LDS Church

Religious life
- Religion: The Church of Jesus Christ of Latter-day Saints
- Church: The Church of Jesus Christ of Latter-day Saints
- Profession: Manager of Deseret Book Company

Senior posting
- Period in office: 1921–1981 (active in LDS Church leadership roles)

Albert Hamer Reiser (August 31, 1897 – April 25, 1981) was a prominent community leader in Utah and a missionary and leader of the Sunday School in the Church of Jesus Christ of Latter-day Saints (LDS Church).

Reiser was born in Salt Lake City, Utah to Albert S. Reiser and Nancy Ellen Hamer. He was a graduate of the University of Utah.

As a career, Reiser was the manager of the Deseret Book Company in Salt Lake City. Without attending a university to study law, he nevertheless became a member of the Utah State Bar.

Reiser was an active participant in community service in Utah. For eight years, Reiser was a member of the University of Utah Board of Regents. He was also a long-time member of the Great Salt Lake Council of Boy Scouts. Reiser was a member of the Utah State Parks and Recreation Commission and from 1938 to 1948, he served as the secretary to the Utah Centennial Committee.

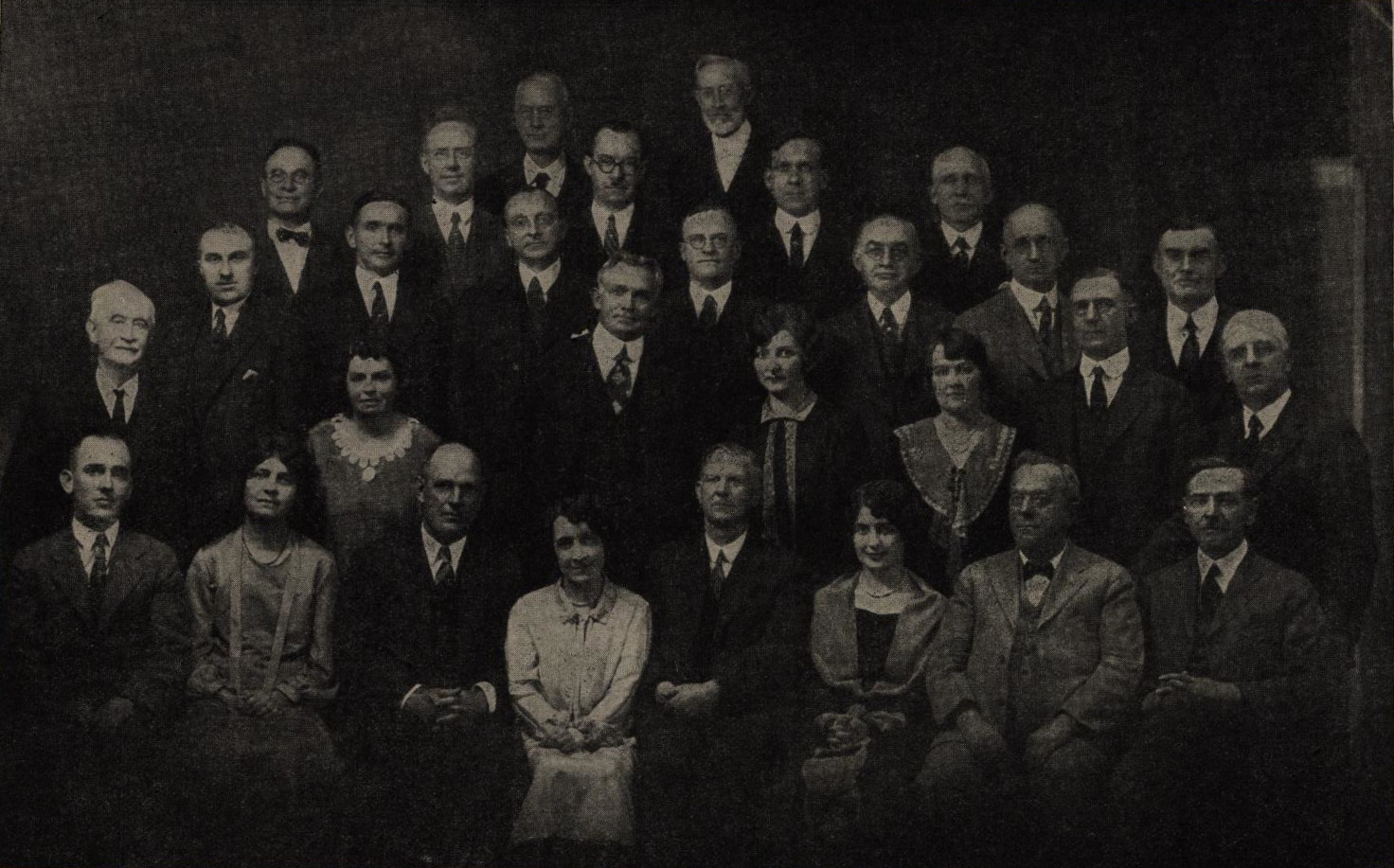
Reiser as general secretary (seated in front, far left) with the board and staff of the Deseret Sunday School Union, 1926

As a member of the LDS Church, Reiser held a variety of prominent positions. Beginning in 1921, David O. McKay selected him to be the secretary to the general superintendency of the Deseret Sunday School Union, a position he would hold for over 20 years. In 1926, Reiser became a member of the general board of the Sunday School, and in 1943 he became the second assistant to general superintendent Milton Bennion. In 1949, when George R. Hill succeeded Bennion, Reiser became Hill's first assistant in the general superintendency of the Sunday School organization. During his time in the Sunday School, Reiser wrote a variety of books and lesson manuals, including a 1945 history of the LDS Church for children.

Reiser served in the Sunday School until 1952, when he was asked to become the president of the British Mission of the church. During his time in England, Reiser organized the church's purchase of the property for the construction of the London Temple.

Reiser returned to Utah in 1955, and became an assistant secretary to the First Presidency of the church. He also was made the president of the Sugar House Stake of the church.

From 1920 until his death, Reiser was married to Elizabeth R. Baxter; he was the father of eight children. Reiser died in Salt Lake City.

== See also ==
- David Lawrence McKay
