= Owl and Key =

Student society at the University of Utah, US

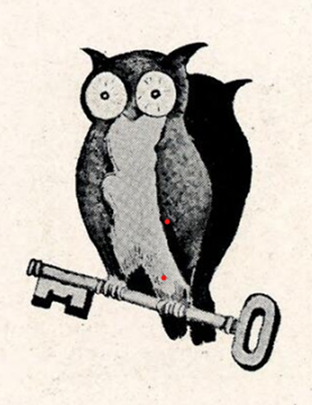
- Owl and Key logo, 1916
- Founded: 1909; 117 years ago University of Utah
- Type: Senior society
- Affiliation: Independent
- Status: Active
- Emphasis: Honor
- Scope: Local
- Chapters: 1
- Headquarters: Salt Lake City, Utah; United States

Owl and Key is a student organization at the University of Utah that is a cross between a senior society and an honor society.

== History ==
Owl and Key, a senior honor society, and Skull and Bones, a junior secret society, were both organized at the University of Utah in 1909. The Utah societies were not affiliated with Yale University but borrowed from its campus traditions.

The purpose of Owl and Key was to foster spirit among the senior class and to uphold the standards and traditions of the University." New members are initiated into the society by alumni of Owl and Key near the start of the spring semester of the senior year. The initiates then plan events such as an annual spring formal.

Owl and Key also acts as the parent organization for Skull and Bones, overseeing the spring recruitment and application process of the juniors who wish to join the secret society. Once applications are received, the active members of Owl and Key select the future members of Skull and Bones.

== Membership ==
Historically, all Owl and Key members were previously members of Skull and Bones, with the latter automatically becoming a member of Owl and Key before graduation. In March 1933, Owl and Key decided to increase its membership by five men so it could also invite worthy students who had not been selected for Skull and Bones. However, its membership is still primarily from Skull and Bones. For example, in its 1940 class, twelve of the fifteen members were from Skull and Bones, with just three new additions. In the 1955 class, eight of the twelve-men members were from Skull and Bones, with four being new additions.

Members are selected the spring semester of their senior year by Owl and Key alumni. Membership was traditionally restricted to senior men; however, women are now members. Invitations are extended students for the academic achievement, leadership, and service in the campus community. Students may also nominate themselves by applying to either Skull and Bones or Owl and Key. Membership to Owl and Key is limited to fifteen initiates per year.

== Notable Members ==
- Bob Bennett – United States Senator
- Arnie Ferrin – professional basketball player
- John Thomas Greene Jr. – United States district judge
- David S. King – United States House of Representatives
- Russell M. Nelson –. President of the Church of Jesus Christ of Latter-day Saints
- Vadal Peterson – basketball coach
- Hugh W. Pinnock – authority of the LDS Church and Presidency of the Seventy
- George Albert Smith Jr. – professor at Harvard Business School
- Thornley King Swan – Chief Judge in the Utah Judicial Council
