= G. William Richards =

- Born: December 25, 1918
- Died: November 30, 2005 (aged 86)
- Occupation: Composer
- Instrument: Organ

G. William "Bill" Richards (December 25, 1918 – November 30, 2005) was an American Latter-day Saint composer and organist.

Richards was the son of Stayner Richards and Jane Taylor.

As a young man, Richards served as a missionary for the Church of Jesus Christ of Latter-day Saints (LDS Church) in the Eastern States Mission. He was transferred to the California Mission to serve as organist of the church's exhibit at the San Francisco World's Fair.

Richards served in the United States army during World War II. He was a chaplain's assistant and carried an organ with him. He was involved in the Battle of the Bulge as well as the liberation of some German death camps.

Richards then studied at the University of California, Berkeley, the Manhattan School of Music and Columbia University. He later was a faculty member at New York University as well as serving as organist for various non-denominational services.

Richards married his wife Claire Dyreng, whom he met while they were both music students in New York, in the Manti Temple in August 1955. They had four children.

Richards later moved with his family to Reno, Nevada, where he served as executive vice-president of the Nevada Division of the American Cancer Society.

After he retired Richards took courses at Utah Technical College (now Utah Valley University) in building.

Richards served in many positions in the LDS Church including bishop of the Manhattan Ward and a member of the committee that organized the 1985 English-language version of the LDS hymnal. Among the hymns in that publication with music by Richards is "From Homes of Saints Glad Songs Arise".
