= Polman =

Polman is a Dutch toponymic surname. It may be a local (Gelderland) form of the surname Poelman, referring to someone living near a pool or small lake, or refer to someone living on pol, a name used in the Eastern Netherlands for raised land. People with this name include:

- Albert Polman (born 1961), Dutch physicist
- Connie Polman-Tuin (born 1963), Canadian heptathlete
- Dick Polman (born 1950s), American political journalist
- Estavana Polman (born 1992), Dutch handball player
- Han Polman (born 1963), Dutch D66 politician, King's Commissioner of Zeeland
- Linda Polman (born 1960), Dutch journalist and author on humanitarian aid
- Marc Polmans (born 1997), South African-born Australian tennis player
- Paul Polman (born 1956), Dutch businessman, CEO of Unilever

== See also ==
- Polman Stadion, football stadium in Almelo, Netherlands, named after a sponsor (Pim Polman, born 1937)
