= Milton Bennion =

American LDS Church leader (1870–1953)

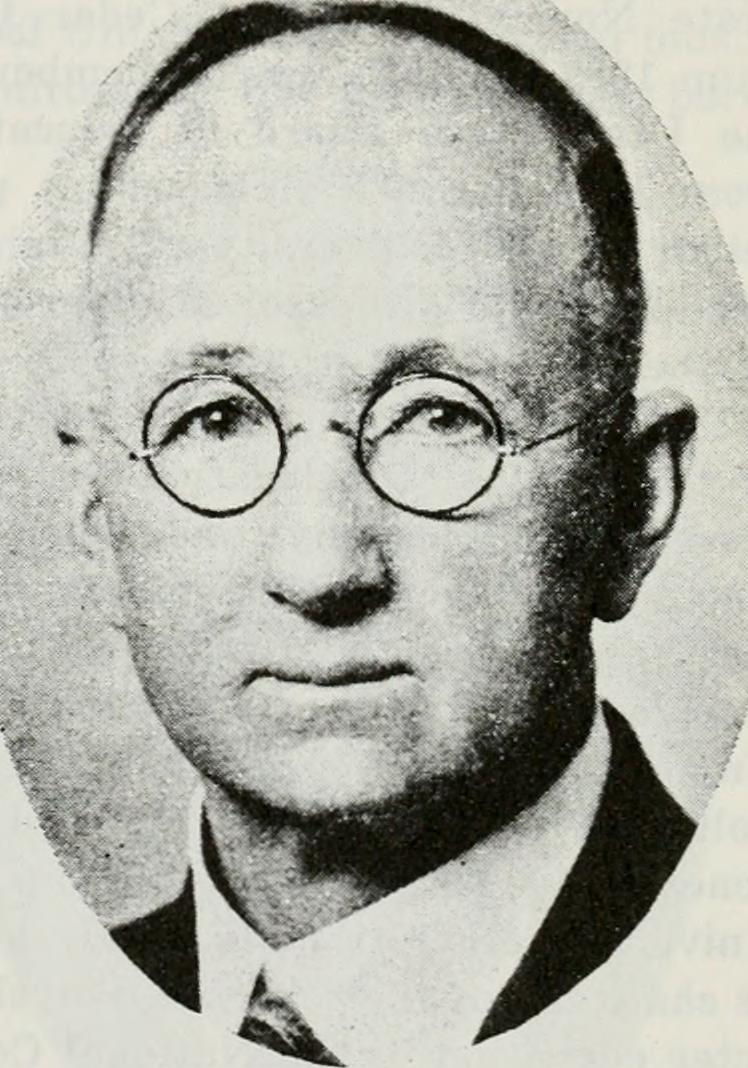
- Born: June 7, 1870; Taylorsville, Utah Territory
- Died: April 5, 1953 (aged 82)
- Education: University of Utah; Columbia University
- Occupation: Educator
- Known for: Southern Utah University; University of Utah

Milton Bennion (June 7, 1870 – April 5, 1953) was an American educator and a university and educational administrator.

== Biography ==
Bennion was born in Taylorsville, Utah Territory. He received a B.S. degree from the University of Utah in 1897 and an M.A. degree from Columbia University in 1901.

From 1897 to 1900, Bennion was the president of the Branch Normal School, an institution that eventually developed into Southern Utah University. From 1898 to 1900, he was also a member of the Utah State Board of Education. In 1901, he joined the faculty of the University of Utah and became a full professor of philosophy in 1904. From 1913 to 1941, he was dean of the university's School of Education. Between 1920 and 1926 Bennion was the chairman of the National Council on Character Education for the National Education Association. Bennion was awarded an honorary doctorate degree in education from the University of Utah in 1931.

Between 1960 and 2013, a building on the Salt Lake City campus of the University of Utah was named in Bennion's honor. In 2006, the Administration Building on the Southern Utah University campus was renamed The Milton and Steven D. Bennion Administration Building, in honor of Bennion and his grandson, who served as president of the school from 1997 until 2006.

== Religious beliefs ==
Bennion was a member of the Church of Jesus Christ of Latter-day Saints (LDS Church), and from 1943 to 1949 he was the sixth general superintendent of the church's Deseret Sunday School Union. His assistants were George R. Hill and A. Hamer Reiser. Bennion succeeded George D. Pyper in this position; Bennion had been Pyper's first assistant in the general Sunday School superintendency since 1934. Bennion was a member of the Sunday School general board for 40 years, beginning in 1909. In 1949, Hill succeeded him as general Sunday School superintendent. Bennion also served as a church missionary to New Zealand from 1889 to 1892.

== Personal life ==
In 1898, Bennion married Cora Lindsay in the Salt Lake Temple. They had 10 children, including Lowell L. Bennion, a prominent Latter Day Saint scholar and educator. A grandson, Steven D. Bennion, has been president of Ricks College, Snow College, and Southern Utah University.
