= Stayner Richards =

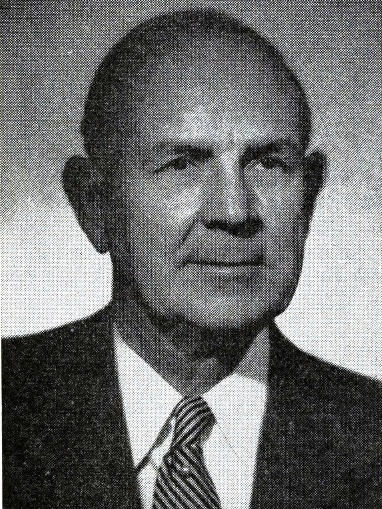
- Richards in 1953

Assistant to the Quorum of the Twelve Apostles
- October 6, 1951 – May 28, 1953

Personal details
- Born: December 20, 1885; Salt Lake City, Utah Territory, United States
- Died: May 28, 1953 (aged 67); Salt Lake City, Utah, United States
- Resting place: Salt Lake City Cemetery; 40°46′37.92″N 111°51′28.8″W
- Spouse(s): Jane Foote Taylor
- Children: 6 G. William Richards
- Parents: Stephen L. Richards; Emma Louise Stayner
- Relatives: Willard Richards (grandfather); Stephen L Richards (brother)
- Signature
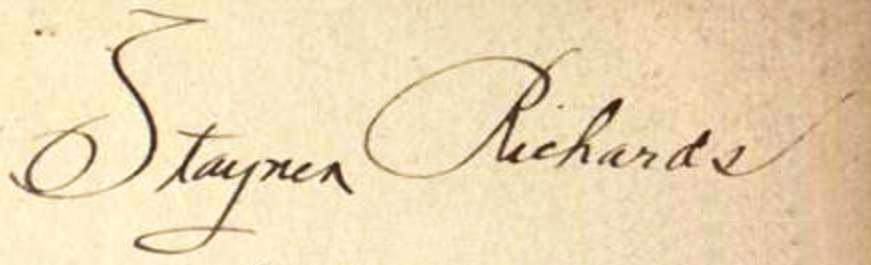

Stayner Richards (December 20, 1885 – May 28, 1953) was a general authority of the Church of Jesus Christ of Latter-day Saints (LDS Church) from 1951 until his death.

Richards was born in Salt Lake City, Utah Territory. He was the brother of Stephen L Richards, who would become an LDS Church apostle, and the grandson of Willard Richards, who was also an apostle. From 1908 to 1910, Richards was an LDS Church missionary in the United Kingdom.

From 1916 to 1928, Richards was the bishop of the church's Highland Park Ward in Salt Lake City. He was also a stake president from 1937 to 1949.

From 1949 to 1952, Richards was president of the church's British Mission. In October 1951, while serving as a mission president, he was called as an Assistant to the Quorum of the Twelve Apostles. As a mission president he helped select the property for the planned London England Temple. Richards was an Assistant to the Twelve until his death from pancreatitis in Salt Lake City. He was buried at the Salt Lake City Cemetery.

Richards was married to Jane Foote Taylor, who he married in December 1911.. They were the parents of six children. One of their children was the hymn composer G. William Richards.
