= Royden G. Derrick =

American Mormon leader (1915–2009)

First Quorum of the Seventy
- October 1, 1976 – September 30, 1989
- End reason: Granted general authority emeritus status

Presidency of the First Quorum of the Seventy
- February 22, 1980 – October 6, 1984
- End reason: Honorably released

Emeritus General Authority
- September 30, 1989 – December 7, 2009

Personal details
- Born: Royden Glade Derrick; September 7, 1915; Salt Lake City, Utah, United States
- Died: December 7, 2009 (aged 94); Salt Lake City, Utah, United States

Royden Glade Derrick (September 7, 1915 – December 7, 2009) was an American industrialist and general authority of the Church of Jesus Christ of Latter-day Saints (LDS Church) from 1976 until his death.

Derrick was born in Salt Lake City, Utah. He attended LDS Business College for a time and later registered at the University of Utah (U of U) in 1934. However, with his desire to serve as a missionary for the LDS Church, he quit school in the spring of 1936 to work full time in order to prepare for that opportunity. In 1945, he established the Western Steel Company, a steel manufacturing company in Utah that grew to be the largest steel fabricator between the Mississippi River and the west coast, and was later acquired by Joy Manufacturing in 1974. He later served on the U of U's board of trustees and was also awarded an honorary doctorate by the school in 1965. In 1973, he was awarded the Jesse Knight Industrial Citizenship Award from Brigham Young University (BYU).

From 1966 to 1971, Derrick was the second assistant to David Lawrence McKay in the general superintendency of the LDS Church's Sunday School organization. From 1973 to 1976, Derrick was president of the church's England Leeds Mission, and from 1976 to 1977 he was president of the Ireland Dublin Mission.

In 1976, when the church's First Quorum of Seventy was reconstituted, Derrick became one of the original members. From 1980 to 1984, he was one of the seven presidents of the seventy. Derrick served as a general authority until 1989, when he was designated as an emeritus general authority. From 1984 to 1987, while serving as a general authority, Derrick was president of the Seattle Temple.

The planetarium at BYU's College of Physical & Mathematical Sciences is named the Royden G. Derrick Planetarium.

Derrick died at his home in Salt Lake City of causes incident to age.
