= Ted E. Brewerton =

LDS leader (1925–2021)

First Quorum of the Seventy
- September 30, 1978 – September 30, 1995
- Called by: Spencer W. Kimball
- End reason: Granted general authority emeritus status

Emeritus General Authority
- September 30, 1995 – September 17, 2021
- Called by: Gordon B. Hinckley

Personal details
- Born: Teddy Eugene Brewerton; March 30, 1925; Raymond, Alberta, Canada
- Died: September 17, 2021 (aged 96); Holladay, Utah, U.S.

Teddy Eugene Brewerton (March 30, 1925 – September 17, 2021) was a Canadian-born American general authority of the Church of Jesus Christ of Latter-day Saints (LDS Church) from 1978 until his death.

== Life ==
Brewerton was born in Raymond, Alberta, Canada. He was a member of the Royal Canadian Airforce during World War II. Brewerton went on a mission for the LDS Church to Uruguay from 1949 to 1952. Brewerton was trained in pharmacy at the University of Alberta.

== LDS Church service ==
From 1965 to 1968, Brewerton was president of the church's mission headquartered in Costa Rica. Brewerton had jurisdiction over the church in Costa Rica, Honduras, Nicaragua, Panama, and Venezuela. During his time as mission president, the church received official recognition from the government of Panama, and was able to begin missionary work in the San Blas Islands.

In 1968, the Brewertons moved to Calgary, Alberta, where Brewerton practiced pharmacy. In 1976, Brewerton was honored by the Alberta Pharmaceutical Association as “the most outstanding pharmacist in community service outside the profession”.

Brewerton served in the church as a bishop of a ward in Calgary. He later served as president of the Calgary Alberta Stake. He was later a regional representative, with assignments over Alaska, western Canada and Oregon. In 1978, he became a general authority and member of the First Quorum of Seventy. In 1979 he moved to São Paulo as the church's area president for Brazil, succeeding William Grant Bangerter. From 1989 to 1990 he was a counselor to Hugh W. Pinnock in the general presidency of the church's Sunday School organization. Brewerton was also the first president of the church's Central American Area. He also chaired the committee that created the LDS Church's Spanish Edition of the Bible.

For a year he was in the presidency of the South America South Area. He also served in the presidency of the Mexico/Central America Area. From 1987 to 1990 he was president of the North America West Area, presiding over the LDS Church in California and Hawaii. In 1995, Brewerton was designated an emeritus general authority and released from active duties. From 1997 to 1999, Brewerton was president of the church's México City México Temple.

In 2009, Brewerton was scheduled to present in the seventh annual Book of Mormon Lands Conference, in Salt Lake City. His topic was "Quetzalcoatl and Topiltzin Quetzalcoatl – Two Separate and Distinct Historical Beings". In 2008 the Book of Mormon archeology conference had given Brewerton its "Father Lehi" award.

== Personal life ==
Brewerton married Dorothy Hall, also a native of Raymond, and they have six children. Due to the LDS Church's formal approach to general authority nomenclature, Brewerton, over time, began being addressed as "Ted E." instead of his birth name "Teddy". He died in September 2021, at the age of 96.
