= LDS High School =

High School

LDS High School (previously known as Salt Lake Stake Academy or Latter-day Saints' High School, and sometimes spelled Latter-day Saints High School) was a secondary school in Salt Lake City, Utah operated by the Church of Jesus Christ of Latter-day Saints (LDS Church). The school was closely associated with Latter-day Saints' University, the last vestiges of which are now Ensign College, formerly known as LDS Business College. Both trace their beginnings to the Salt Lake Stake Academy, which started in 1886. The LDS High School name was adopted in 1927.

In 1931, LDS High School was closed, leaving about 1,000 students to attend public high schools, most notably the newly built South High, which opened in the fall of that year. The closure was a late example of a process of closure of most LDS-run secondary schools in the Utah area.

== Notable alumni ==
- Gordon B. Hinckley (1928), 15th President of the LDS Church
- Lenore LaFount (1926), wife of George W. Romney; First Lady of Michigan (1963–69); mother of Presidential candidate Mitt Romney
- Lynn S. Richards, Utah lawyer, politician, and leader in the LDS Church
- George W. Romney (1926), American businessman and politician; Governor of Michigan (1963–69); father of Presidential candidate Mitt Romney
- Rulon Jeffs, Mormon fundamentalist
- Henry S. Kesler, movie and television producer; grandson of Joseph F. Smith.
