= John Thomas Greene Jr. =

American judge (1929–2011)

Senior Judge of the United States District Court for the District of Utah
- In office November 28, 1997 – February 11, 2011

Judge of the United States District Court for the District of Utah
- In office April 4, 1985 – November 28, 1997
- Appointed by: Ronald Reagan
- Preceded by: Seat established by 98 Stat. 333
- Succeeded by: Ted Stewart

Personal details
- Born: John Thomas Greene Jr. November 28, 1929 Salt Lake City, Utah
- Died: February 11, 2011 (aged 81) Salt Lake City, Utah
- Education: University of Utah (B.A.); University of Utah College of Law (J.D.)

John Thomas Greene Jr. (November 28, 1929 – February 11, 2011) was a United States district judge of the United States District Court for the District of Utah.

== Early life ==
Green was born in Salt Lake City, Utah. He received a Bachelor of Arts degree from the University of Utah in 1952. While there, he was a member of Phi Beta Kappa, Pi Kappa Alpha, and Owl and Key. He attended the University of Utah College of Law and received a Juris Doctor in 1955.

== Career ==
Greene was in private practice in Salt Lake City for much of the period from 1955 to 1985, and. He was an Assistant United States Attorney for the District of Utah from 1957 to 1959 and was a special assistant state attorney general of Utah from 1960 to 1965. He was elected Utah State Bar President in 1970. He was also active in the American Bar Association, where he served for 17 years in the House of Delegates, as a Delegate at Large, as the designated Utah State Bar Delegate, and finally as a member of the ABA Board of Governors. He was chairman of the Utah State Building Authority in 1980, and a member of the Utah Board of Higher Education from 1983 to 1986.

On March 7, 1985, Greene was nominated by President Ronald Reagan to a new seat on the United States District Court for the District of Utah created by 98 Stat. 333. He was confirmed by the United States Senate on April 3, 1985, and received his commission on April 4, 1985. Greene assumed senior status on November 28, 1997.

== Personal ==
He died on February 11, 2011, in Salt Lake City.

== Sources ==
- Salt Lake Tribute Obituary

Legal offices
Preceded by Seat established by 98 Stat. 333	Judge of the United States District Court for the District of Utah; 1985–1997	Succeeded by Ted Stewart
