= Stephen L Richards =

American religious leader (1879-1959)

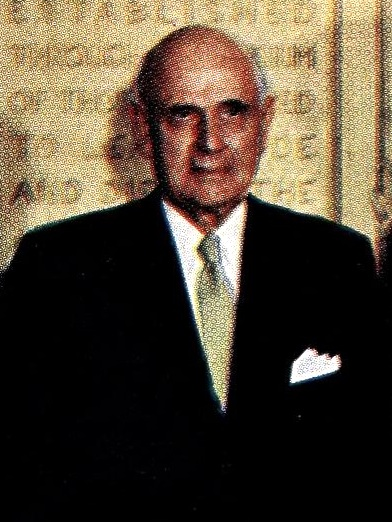
- Richards, ca. 1956

First Counselor in the First Presidency
- April 9, 1951 – May 19, 1959
- Predecessor: J. Reuben Clark
- Successor: J. Reuben Clark

Quorum of the Twelve Apostles
- January 18, 1917 – April 9, 1951
- End reason: Called as First Counselor in the First Presidency

LDS Church Apostle
- January 18, 1917 – May 19, 1959
- Reason: Death of Francis M. Lyman
- Reorganization at end of term: Henry D. Moyle added to First Presidency; Howard W. Hunter ordained

Personal details
- Born: June 18, 1879; Mendon, Utah Territory, United States
- Died: May 19, 1959 (aged 79); Salt Lake City, Utah, United States
- Resting place: Wasatch Lawn Memorial Park; 40°41′52.08″N 111°50′30.12″W
- Spouse(s): Irene Smith Merrill
- Children: 9
- Parents: Stephen L. Richards; Emma Louise Stayner
- Relatives: Willard Richards (grandfather); Stayner Richards (brother)

Stephen L Richards (June 18, 1879 – May 19, 1959) was a prominent leader in the Church of Jesus Christ of Latter-day Saints (LDS Church). He was a member of the church's Quorum of the Twelve Apostles and the First Counselor in the First Presidency.

== Early life ==
Richards was born in Mendon, Utah Territory. He was the oldest of ten children born to Stephen Longstroth Richards and Emma Louise Stayner. He was raised in Cache Valley. Richards was the grandson of Willard Richards, an early church apostle and colleague of Joseph Smith.

Richards married Irene Smith Merrill (a maternal granddaughter of George A. Smith) in 1900. The couple had nine children, including a son, Lynn S. Richards, a Utah politician and church leader.

== Education and profession ==
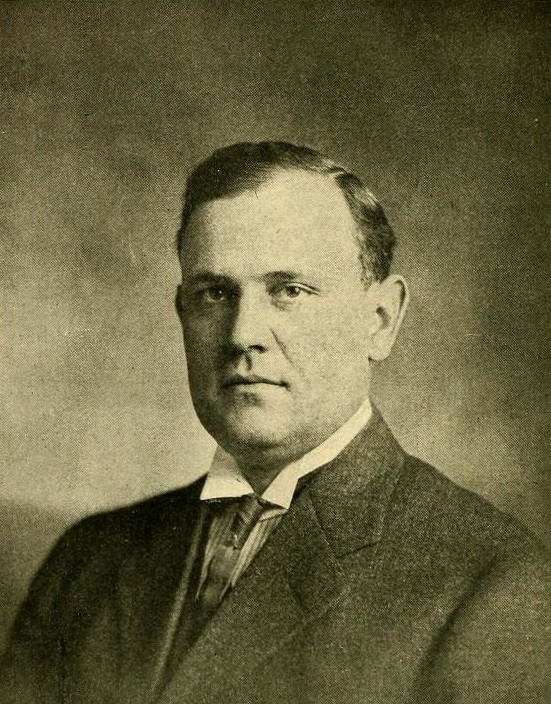
Richards during his legal career

Richards did undergraduate studies at the University of Utah. He received a J.D. degree from the University of Chicago Law School in 1904, and began his law school career at the University of Michigan, later transferring to Chicago.

After graduating from the University of Chicago, Richards practiced law in Salt Lake City and was a professor of law at the University of Utah. He had been considering running for governor of Utah in the 1918 election, but decided not to do after being called as an apostle in 1917.

== Church leadership ==
Richards joined the superintendency of the Deseret Sunday School Union in 1909 as second assistant to church president and general superintendent Joseph F. Smith, alongside first assistant David O. McKay. Smith subsequently called Richards to be an apostle in 1917, at the age of 37. Upon Smith's death in 1918, McKay became the new Sunday School superintendent and retained Richards as first assistant. Richards remained in the Deseret Sunday School Union Superintendency until 1934, when he and McKay were released from these positions in order to free up the apostles to focus on other aspects of church governance.

When McKay became the church's president, he selected Richards as his first counselor. Richards served in that position from April 9, 1951, until his death. Richards followed his grandfather, Willard Richards, by serving in both the Quorum of the Twelve and in the First Presidency.

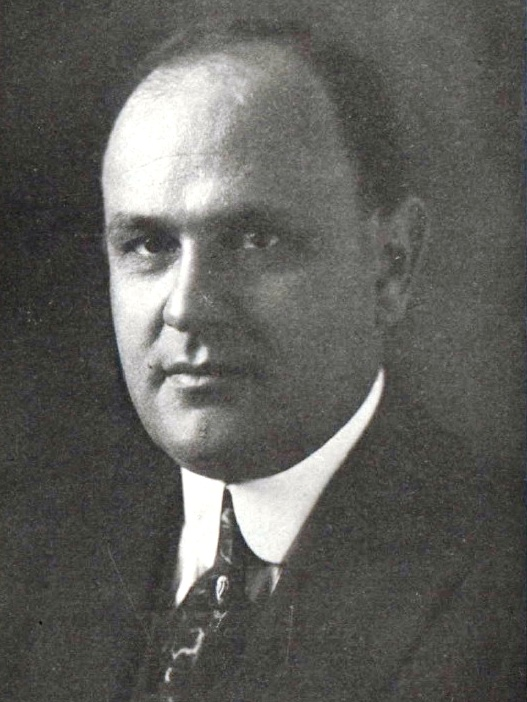
ca.1917

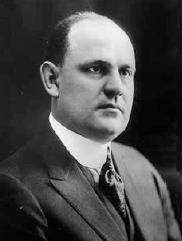
ca.1920

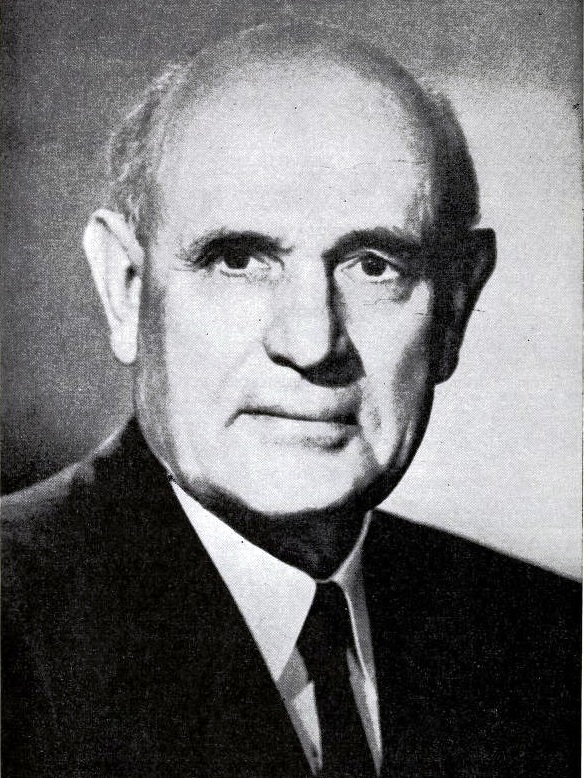
ca.1959

The Christus statue that is at the visitors center on Temple Square in Salt Lake City was purchased by Richards as a gift to McKay.

Richards was a mentor to Gordon B. Hinckley as the head of the Radio, Publicity and Missionary Literature Committee when Hinckley served as its executive secretary.

== Death ==
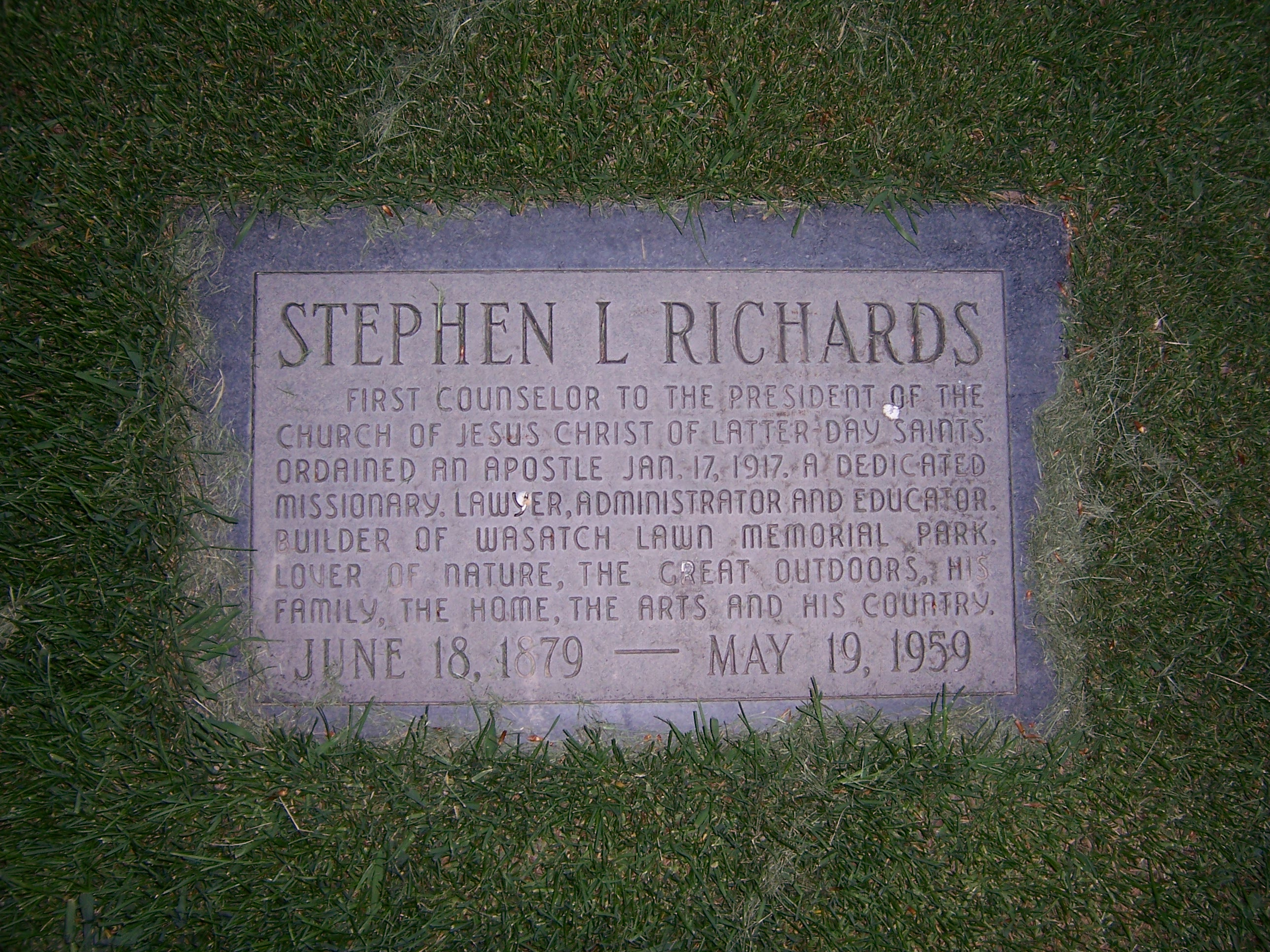
Richards' grave marker

Richards died in Salt Lake City at the age of 79, shortly before his 80th birthday.

== See also ==
- Stayner Richards

The Church of Jesus Christ of Latter-day Saints titles
Preceded by J. Reuben Clark	First Counselor in the First Presidency; April 9, 1951 – May 19, 1959	Succeeded by J. Reuben Clark
Preceded by James E. Talmage	Quorum of the Twelve Apostles; January 18, 1917 – April 9, 1951	Succeeded by Richard R. Lyman
