= Russell T. Osguthorpe =

American LDS Church leader (born 1946)

General President of the Sunday School
- April 4, 2009 – April 5, 2014

Personal details
- Born: December 4, 1946 (age 79); Salt Lake City, Utah, United States
- Alma mater: Brigham Young University
- Spouse(s): Lolly Osguthorpe
- Children: 5

Russell Trent Osguthorpe (born December 4, 1946) is an American professor of education and was the 20th general president of the Sunday School of the Church of Jesus Christ of Latter-day Saints (LDS Church) from 2009 to 2014.

Osguthorpe was born in Salt Lake City, Utah and received multiple education degrees, including a Ph.D., from Brigham Young University (BYU), where he was a professor of Instructional Psychology and Technology until he retired in 2013. Osguthorpe also studied at the University of Utah.

Osguthorpe wrote Choose to Learn: Teaching for Success Every Day and Balancing the Tensions of Change. He has also written materials on deaf education. Osguthorpe was the lead author of Partner School: Centers for Educational Renewal and this book is often cited as one of the leading works on the subject. Osguthorpe wrote and article with his son, Richard D. Osguthorpe, entitled "Instructional Design as a Living Practice: Toward a Conscience of Craft".

Osguthorpe was the director of the Center for Teaching and Learning at BYU. He has also served as an associate dean of BYU's David O. McKay School of Education. He was previously a visiting faculty member at the University of Toronto and the University of Paris and a member of the faculty of the National Technical Institute for the Deaf in Rochester, New York. Since 1998, Osguthorpe has held the Martha Jane Knowlton Coray University Professorship at BYU.

== LDS Church service ==
Osguthorpe has served in the LDS Church as president of the South Dakota Rapid City Mission from 2003 to 2006, an area seventy and member of the Fifth Quorum of the Seventy from 2007 to 2009, and president of the BYU 18th Stake from 1997 to 2002. He is a former member of the Tabernacle Choir at Temple Square. In the 1960s, Osguthorpe was an LDS Church missionary in Tahiti.

At the church's April 2009 General Conference Osguthorpe was accepted by the membership as the general president of the church's Sunday School, succeeding A. Roger Merrill. Osguthorpe selected David M. McConkie and Matthew O. Richardson as his counselors. Osguthorpe spoke on submitting one's will to the Lord at a 2013 Church Educational System devotional for young adults originating in the Marriott Center on the BYU campus in Provo, Utah.

In the April 2014 General Conference, Osguthorpe and his counselors were released, with Tad R. Callister named as his successor. Later in 2014, Osguthorpe began an anticipated 3-year assignment as president of the church's Bismarck North Dakota Temple.

== Personal life ==
Osguthorpe and his wife, Lolly, are the parents of five children. He has also written a hymn with his wife.

== Bibliography ==
- Partner School: Centers for Educational Renewal (Jossey-Bass Publishers, March 28, 1995, ISBN 978-0787900656)
- The Education of the Heart: Rediscovering the Spiritual Roots of Learning (Covenant Communications Inc, September 1, 1996, ISBN 978-1555039851)
- Balancing the Tensions of Change: Eight Keys to Collaborative Educational Renewal (Corwin, September 28, 1998)
- Choose to Learn: Teaching for Success Every Day (Skyhorse, October 6, 2015, ISBN 978-1634503167)
