= Matthew O. Richardson =

American professor (born 1960)

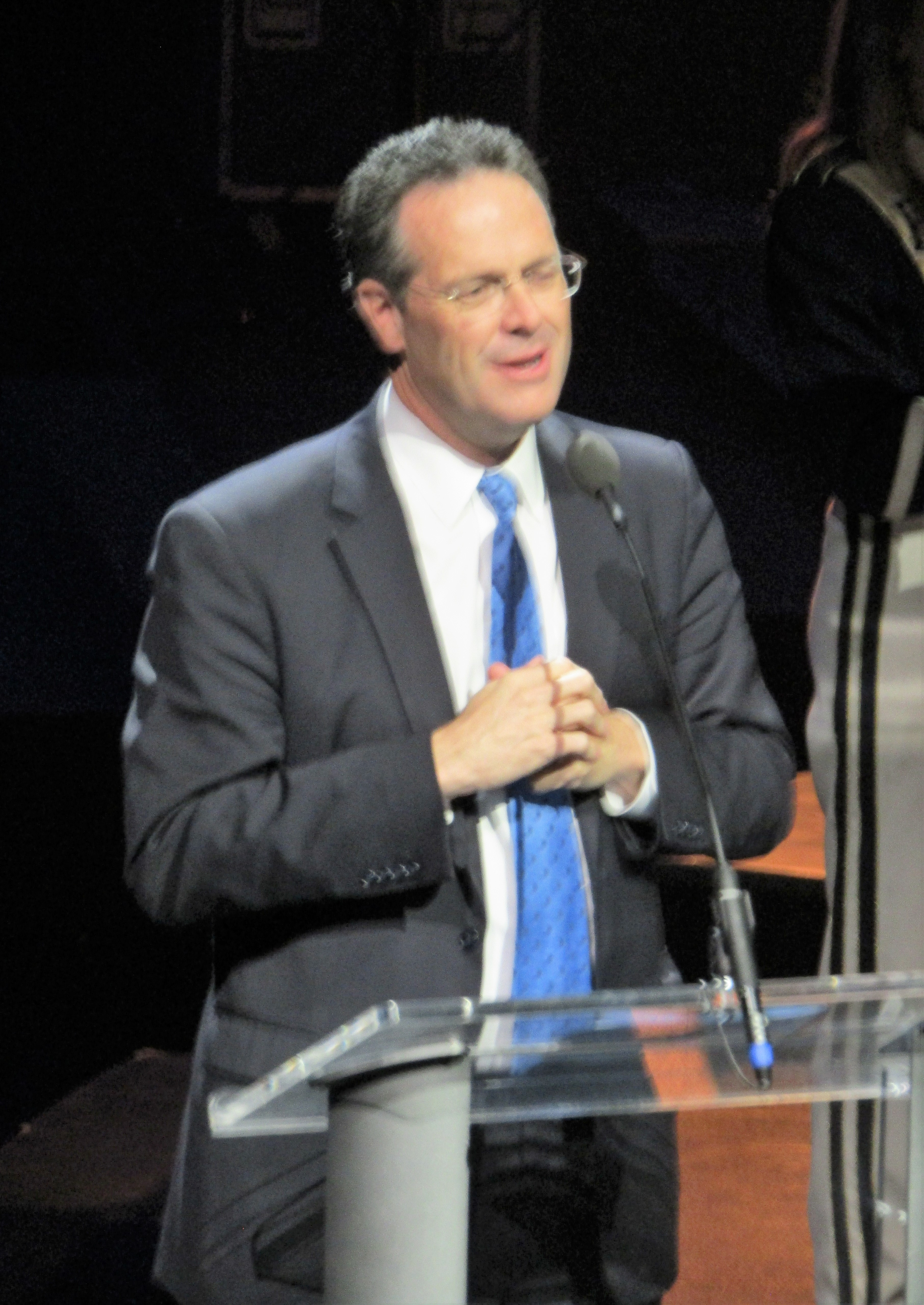
Matthew O. Richardson in 2017

Matthew Ottesen Richardson (born December 12, 1960) was the Advancement Vice President at Brigham Young University (BYU) from 2014 to 2020. He served previously as a professor of religion at BYU and from 2002 to 2006 he was an associate dean of religious education at BYU.

As a young man, Richardson served as a missionary of the Church of Jesus Christ of Latter-day Saints (LDS Church) in Denmark. Richardson received all his degrees from BYU: a B.A. in communications, an M.Ed. in Education Leadership and Curriculum, and an Ed.D. in Education Leadership.

He taught for the Church Educational System from 1986 to 1993 and then was a religion lecturer at BYU from 1993 to 1996. He joined the religion faculty in 1996. He has received the Robert J. Matthews Teaching award, the Professor of Integrity award, and a four-year Religious Education fellowship. In May 2014, Richardson was appointed as BYU's Advancement Vice President, succeeding Kevin J Worthen, who had been appointed the university's president. In this role, Richardson responsibilities include athletics, communications, BYU Broadcasting, and alumni relations.

Richardson has written several books including The Christus Legacy, The Relationship Seasons and Personal Promises from the Lord to You.

From April 2009 to April 2014, Richardson served as the second counselor to Russell T. Osguthorpe in the LDS Church's Sunday School General Presidency. While in the Sunday School General Presidency, Richardson was involved in creating the "Come Follow Me" curriculum for youth instruction.

Early in 2020, the LDS Church announced that, in July of that year, Richardson would begin an anticipated service of three years as president of the Minnesota Minneapolis Mission. He was succeeded as BYU's Advancement Vice President by Keith Vorkink, effective May 18, 2020.

Richardson and his wife, Lisa, are the parents of four children.
