= Melvin J. Ballard =

American Mormon leader

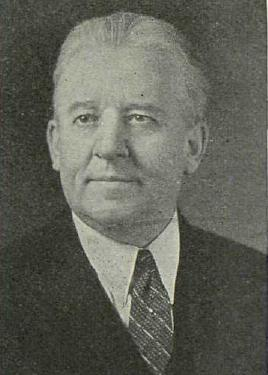

Quorum of the Twelve Apostles
- January 7, 1919 – July 30, 1939

LDS Church Apostle
- January 7, 1919 – July 30, 1939
- Reason: Death of Joseph F. Smith; reorganization of First Presidency
- Reorganization at end of term: No additional apostles ordained

Personal details
- Born: Melvin Joseph Ballard; February 9, 1873; Logan, Utah Territory, United States
- Died: July 30, 1939 (aged 66); Salt Lake City, Utah, United States
- Resting place: Salt Lake City Cemetery; 40°46′37.92″N 111°51′28.8″W
- Spouse(s): Martha A. Jones
- Children: 8

Melvin Joseph Ballard (February 9, 1873 – July 30, 1939) was a member of the Quorum of the Twelve Apostles of the Church of Jesus Christ of Latter-day Saints (LDS Church). His grandson, M. Russell Ballard, also became an apostle.

== Birth and early life ==
Ballard was born at Logan, Utah Territory, to Henry Ballard and Margaret McNeil. His father was a native of England and had immigrated to Utah in 1852 to gather with the Latter-day Saints. Henry Ballard had been aboard the Saluda when it exploded at Lexington, Missouri, and was injured in that incident. He later served under Porter Rockwell in the Nauvoo Legion when it made efforts to prevent the entry of Johnston's Army into Utah Territory. In 1858, Henry was the first settler of Logan, and he served as bishop of the Logan 2nd Ward from 1861 until 1900.

Prior to Ballard's birth, his mother had an experience that led her to believe her son would be an apostle. In Ballard's patriarchal blessing, this was reaffirmed.

Ballard attended Brigham Young College; he graduated in 1884.

== Career and early church service ==
In June 1896, Ballard married Martha A. Jones. The following month he left with B. H. Roberts and George D. Pyper on a mission to the large cities of the eastern United States. He was later reassigned to the Northern States Mission. Ballard returned to Utah in December 1898.

In 1899, Ballard organized the Logan Knitting Factory along with Joseph E. Cardon. In 1900, he became a counselor in the bishopric of the Logan 2nd Ward.

== Mission president ==
Ballard served for several years as president of the Northwestern States Mission of the church. While serving in this capacity, he organized missionary work on some of the Native American reservations in Montana.

== Apostleship ==
When new church president Heber J. Grant was pondering whom to call as an apostle to replace the vacancy caused by the death of his predecessor, Joseph F. Smith, he decided to select his good friend Richard W. Young, as many suspected he would. As Grant met with the Quorum of the Twelve Apostles to announce his decision, he found himself saying that the Lord wanted Melvin J. Ballard to serve in the position. Grant used this experience to teach about revelation and to testify that the Lord gives inspiration to the President of the Church.

Ballard was ordained an apostle and became a member of the Quorum of the Twelve Apostles on January 7, 1919. As an apostle, Ballard opened up missionary work in South America in 1925 in Buenos Aires, Argentina.

Ballard served in the Quorum until his death in Salt Lake City from leukemia. Sylvester Q. Cannon was called to fill the vacancy caused by Ballard's death. Ballard was buried in Salt Lake City Cemetery.

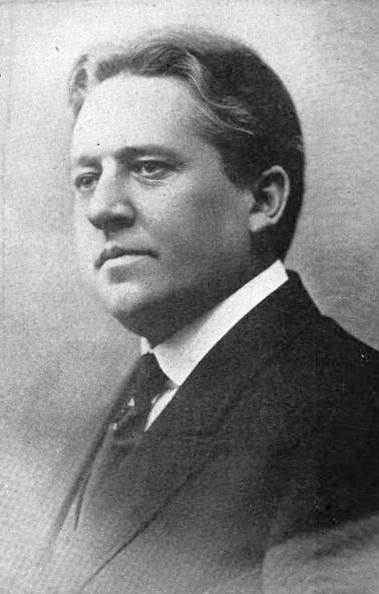
Ballard when ordained as an apostle (1919)

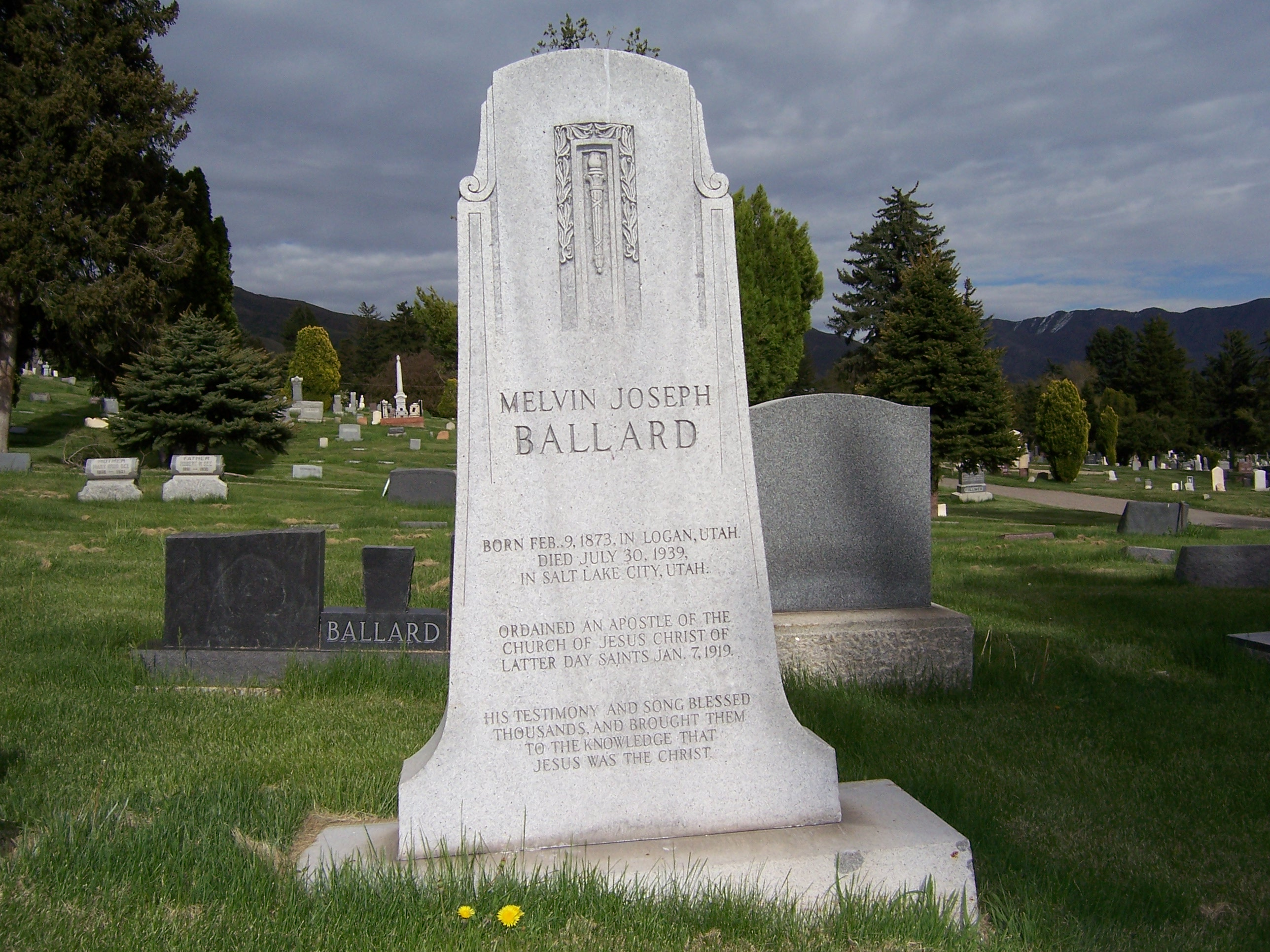
West view of Grave marker

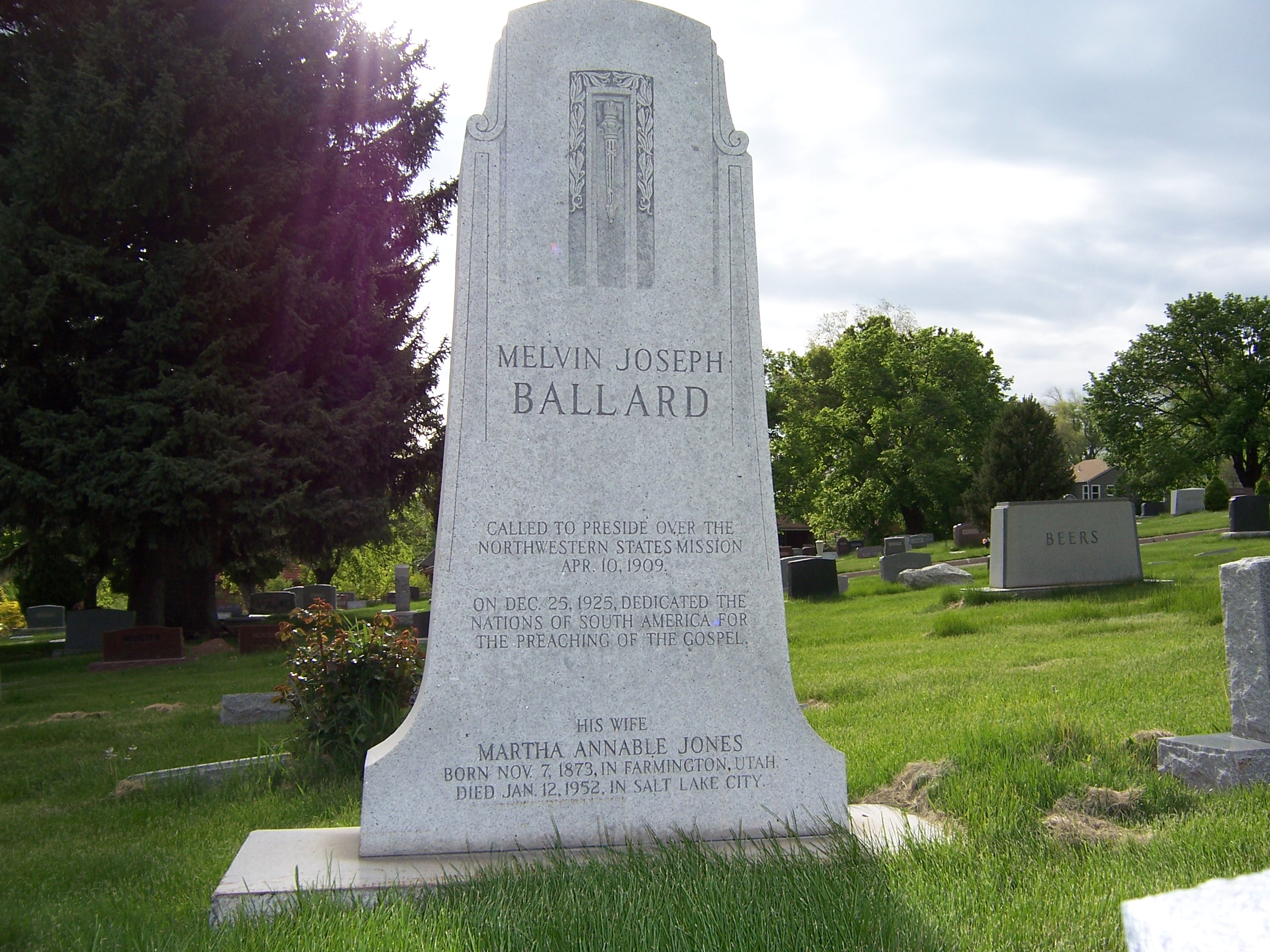
East View of grave marker

== Published works ==
- Ballard, Melvin J (1966). Melvin J. Ballard, Crusader for Righteousness. Bookcraft. 1.
- Three Degrees of Glory: A Discourse. Deseret Book Company. 1922. 2.

== Biographies by others ==
- Hinckley, Bryant S., ed. (1949). Sermons and Missionary Services of Melvin J. Ballard. Deseret Book Company. 3.

== Notes ==
The Church of Jesus Christ of Latter-day Saints titles
Preceded by Richard R. Lyman	Quorum of the Twelve Apostles; January 7, 1919 – July 30, 1939	Succeeded by John A. Widtsoe
