= William D. Oswald =

William Duncan Oswald (born 1936) was a counselor to A. Roger Merrill in the Sunday School General Presidency of the Church of Jesus Christ of Latter-day Saints (LDS Church) from 2004 to 2009. Oswald was also a counselor in the same organization to Russell M. Nelson in 1978 and 1979.

Oswald was born in Salt Lake City, Utah. He served as an LDS Church missionary in England and Scotland. Oswald obtained a law degree from the University of Utah and worked as an attorney in Salt Lake City. He was involved in rewriting Utah laws related to those applicable to redevelopments. His firm, Oswald and Feil, is part of the Utah Redevelopment Association. Oswald helped to draft Utah's Redevelopment Authority Law in 1969 and as of 1991 was a vocal defender of its use in practice.

Oswald was so involved in land redevelopment that one time he was fired by the Sandy, Utah redevelopment authority because he was also representing the Utah Transit Authority which was a potential buyer. Before working with Sandy Oswald had been a lawyer for the Salt Lake City RDA. As such he was a key player in the negotiations leading to building an arena for the Utah Jazz. As of 1996 he and his partner Randy Feil were the only lawyers contracted with by the Utah Transit Authority.

Oswald's other callings in the LDS Church have included being a bishop in Salt Lake City, and at one point was the bishop of church president Spencer W. Kimball. In the 1980s, Oswald was a regional representative. From 2001 to 2004, Oswald was president of the church's Russia Vladivostok Mission. His wife, Mavis, who served as his companion during their mission holds a certificate in Russian from Dartmouth College.

In 1978 and 1979, Oswald was the second counselor to Nelson in the Sunday School General Presidency. In 1979, he also served briefly as Nelson's first counselor. Oswald was then called again in 2004 to serve in the Sunday School General Presidency with Merrill.

== See also ==
- Daniel K Judd
