= Sunday School (LDS Church) =

Educational organization of The Church of Jesus Christ of Latter-day Saints

- Formation: November 11, 1867
- Purpose: Religious instruction
- Headquarters: Salt Lake City, Utah, USA
- Members: 12 million; ages 12 and older
- General President: Paul V. Johnson
- Main organ: General presidency and general board
- Parent organization: The Church of Jesus Christ of Latter-day Saints
- Website: ChurchOfJesusChrist.org
- Remarks: Named "Deseret Sunday School Union" until 1971

Sunday School (formerly the Deseret Sunday School Union) is an organization of the Church of Jesus Christ of Latter-day Saints (LDS Church). All members of the church and any interested nonmembers, age 11 and older, are encouraged to participate in Sunday School.

== History ==
=== Early LDS Sunday Schools ===
Historical records indicate that some form of Sunday school was held by Latter Day Saints in Kirtland, Ohio, and Nauvoo, Illinois, in the 1830s and 1840s. However, the meetings were ad hoc and no formal organization endured the Mormon exodus from Nauvoo.

The first formal Sunday School in the LDS Church was held on December 9, 1849, in Salt Lake City under the direction of Richard Ballantyne, a former Sunday school teacher in the Relief Presbyterian Church in Scotland. Lacking a suitable building to hold the meeting in, Ballantyne invited his students into his own home; approximately thirty Latter-day Saint children between the ages of 8 and 15 attended. The local congregation that Ballantyne belonged to—the Salt Lake City Fourteenth Ward—quickly adopted Ballantyne's Sunday school program and integrated it with regular Sunday meetings. Other LDS Church congregations followed the Fourteenth Ward's example and adopted Sunday school programs based on the Ballantyne model. At this stage, each Sunday school was completely autonomous and under the sole direction of the local bishop.

=== Deseret Sunday School Union ===
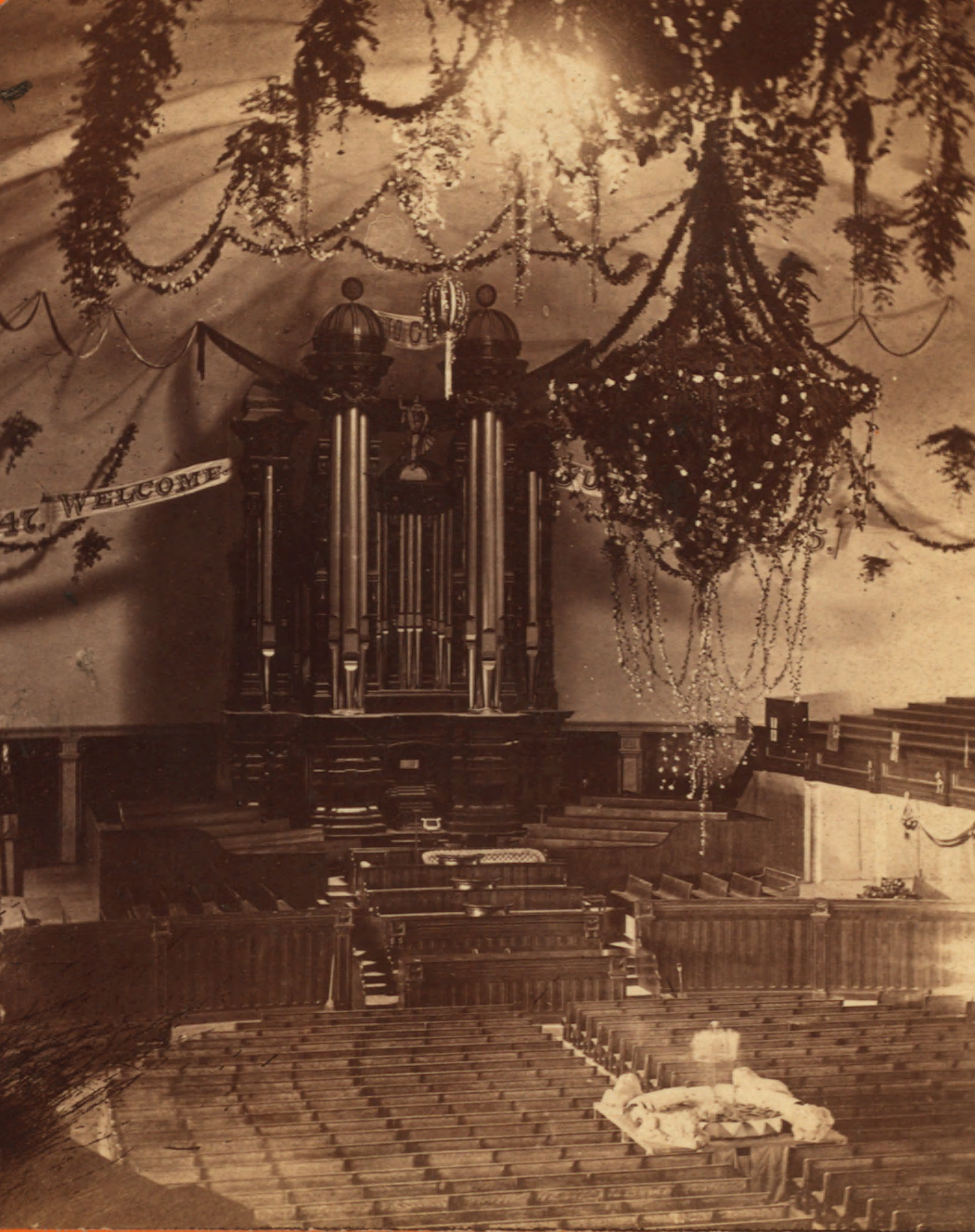
The interior of the Salt Lake Tabernacle as decorated for the Deseret Sunday School Union's July 1875 Pioneer Day celebration.

Anxious to bring a standard structure and organization to the over 200 independent Sunday schools that had been created, LDS Church president Brigham Young ordered that a union of the Sunday schools be carried out. On November 11, 1867, Young and church leaders Daniel H. Wells, George A. Smith, Wilford Woodruff, George Q. Cannon, and Brigham Young Jr. met and organized the Parent Sunday School Union. Young appointed Cannon as the first general superintendent of the Sunday School, a position he would hold until his death in 1901. In 1872, the Sunday School organization was renamed the Deseret Sunday School Union.

The organized Sunday School addressed lesson topics and source materials, grading, prizes and rewards, use of hymns and songs composed by members of the church, recording and increasing the attendance, developing an elementary catechism, and libraries. It also sponsored the publication of administrative guidelines and materials for classroom use, resulting in increased uniformity lesson content.

Until the turn of the century, only children were taught by the Sunday School. Eventually, classes were added for the youth of the church; in 1904, an adult Sunday School class was created.

=== Priesthood Correlation Program changes ===
The 1970s saw dramatic change within the Sunday School. In 1971, as part of the church Priesthood Correlation Program, the name of the Deseret Sunday School Union was changed to simply Sunday School, and the Sunday School general "superintendent" was renamed the general Sunday School "president". Additionally, curriculum planning and writing became more centralized and coordinated; for the first time, the Sunday School stopped providing unique lesson manuals each year, and the church began a four-year curriculum rotation pattern. In 1979, Hugh W. Pinnock became the general president of the Sunday School, the first church general authority to hold the position since apostle David O. McKay's tenure ended in 1934. In 1980, the church instructed the Sunday School to stop passing the sacrament during its classes, a practice that Brigham Young had begun in 1877.

=== Sunday School periodicals ===
In 1866, just prior to the formal organization of the Sunday School Union, Cannon had begun publishing the Juvenile Instructor magazine. Although the magazine was owned and edited solely by Cannon, it nevertheless became the de facto official publication of the Deseret Sunday School Union in the late 1860s. On January 1, 1901, the church purchased the magazine from the Cannon family and the Juvenile Instructor officially became an organ of the church's Sunday School. In 1930, it was replaced by The Instructor, which was published until 1970. The Sunday School currently does not have an official periodical, but information that may be used in Sunday School appears in the Ensign (now the Liahona) and the New Era (now the For the Strength of Youth) magazines.

=== Sunday school presidencies ===
On March 18, 2026, a letter from the First Presidency to church leaders was written, saying, "The First Presidency and Quorum of the Twelve Apostles have determined that, effective immediately, the bishop may call a man or a woman to serve as ward Sunday school president". The letter also said, "If a man is called as Sunday school president, he must hold the Melchizedek Priesthood, and his counselors and secretary must be male members of the ward. If a woman is called as Sunday school president, her counselors and secretary must be female members of the ward." Previously, ward Sunday school presidents could only be men, which is still the case for stake Sunday school presidents and at the general church level, including the Sunday School General Presidency.

=== Chronology of the general superintendency and presidency of the Sunday School ===
No.	Dates	General President (General Superintendents in Italics) (Church general authorities in bold)	First Counselor (First Assistants in Italics) (Church general authorities in bold)	Second Counselor (Second Assistants in Italics) (Church general authorities in bold)
1	1867–1901	**George Q. Cannon**	George Goddard (1872–99); Karl G. Maeser (1899–1901)	**John Morgan** (1883–94); Karl G. Maeser (1894–99); **George Reynolds** (1899–1901)
2	1901	**Lorenzo Snow**	**George Reynolds**	Joseph M. Tanner
3	1901–18	**Joseph F. Smith**	**George Reynolds** (1901–09); **David O. McKay** (1909–18)	Joseph M. Tanner (1901–06); **David O. McKay** (1907–09); Stephen L Richards (1909–18)
4	1918–34	**David O. McKay**	**Stephen L Richards**	George D. Pyper
5	1934–43	George D. Pyper	Milton Bennion	George R. Hill
6	1943–49	Milton Bennion	George R. Hill	A. Hamer Reiser
7	1949–66	George R. Hill	A. Hamer Reiser (1949–52); David Lawrence McKay (1952–66)	David Lawrence McKay (1949–52); Lynn S. Richards (1952–66)
8	1966–71	David Lawrence McKay	Lynn S. Richards	Royden G. Derrick
9	1971–79	Russell M. Nelson	Joseph B. Wirthlin (1971–75); B. Lloyd Poelman (1975–78); Joe J. Christensen (1978–79); William D. Oswald (1979)	Richard L. Warner (1971–75); Joe J. Christensen (1975–78); William D. Oswald (1978–79); J. Hugh Baird (1979)
10	1979–86	**Hugh W. Pinnock**	**Ronald E. Poelman** (1979–81); **Robert D. Hales** (1981–85); **Adney Y. Komatsu** (1985–86)	**Jack H. Goaslind** (1979–81); **James M. Paramore** (1981–83); **Loren C. Dunn** (1983–85); **Ronald E. Poelman** (1985–86)
11	1986–89	**Robert L. Simpson**	**Adney Y. Komatsu** (1986–87); **Devere Harris** (1987–89)	**A. Theodore Tuttle** (1986); **Devere Harris** (1987); **Philip T. Sonntag** (1987–88); **Derek A. Cuthbert** (1988–89)
12	1989–92	**Hugh W. Pinnock**	**Derek A. Cuthbert** (1989–91); **H. Verlan Andersen** (1991); **Hartman Rector Jr.** (1991–92)	**Ted E. Brewerton** (1989–90); **H. Verlan Andersen** (1990–91); **Rulon G. Craven** (1991); **Clinton L. Cutler** (1991–92)
13	1992–94	**Merlin R. Lybbert**	**Clinton L. Cutler**	**Ronald E. Poelman**
14	1994–95	**Charles A. Didier**	**J Ballard Washburn**	**F. Burton Howard**
15	1995–2000	**Harold G. Hillam**	**F. Burton Howard** (1995–97); **Glenn L. Pace** (1997–98); **Neil L. Andersen** (1998–2000)	**Glenn L. Pace** (1995–97); **Neil L. Andersen** (1997–98); **John H. Groberg** (1998–2000)
16	2000–01	**Marlin K. Jensen**	**Neil L. Andersen**	**John H. Groberg**
17	2001–03	**Cecil O. Samuelson**	**John H. Groberg**	**Richard J. Maynes** (2001–02); **Val R. Christensen** (2002–03)
18	2003–04	**Merrill J. Bateman**	**John H. Groberg**	**Val R. Christensen**
19	2004–09	A. Roger Merrill	Daniel K Judd	William D. Oswald
20	2009–14	Russell T. Osguthorpe	David M. McConkie	Matthew O. Richardson
21	2014–19	Tad R. Callister	John S. Tanner (2014–15); Devin G. Durrant (2015–19)	Devin G. Durrant (2014–15); Brian K. Ashton (2015–19)
22	2019–2024	Mark L. Pace	Milton Camargo	Jan E. Newman
23	2024-	Paul V. Johnson	Chad H Webb	Gabriel W. Reid

== Sunday School in the church today ==
=== Curriculum ===
Sunday School focuses on a study of the standard works of the church, which are considered scripture. The main class in Sunday School for adults is called "Gospel Doctrine". In general, the Gospel Doctrine curriculum follows a four-year cycle:

- Year 1 (most recently, 2022, and upcoming in 2026): Old Testament (and the Book of Moses and Book of Abraham from the Pearl of Great Price)
- Year 2 (most recently, 2023): New Testament
- Year 3 (most recently, 2024): Book of Mormon
- Year 4 (most recently, 2025): Doctrine and Covenants and church history

However, there are also a number of "generalist" and "specialist" classes that may be taught in Sunday School. For example, Gospel Principles is a generalist class that is primarily intended for those new to, or inexperienced, in the church or for those with a calling related to missionary work. It is also common for a local congregation to offer specialist Sunday School classes in family history, temples, marriage and family relations, and teacher training.

In most church congregations, Sunday School is a 40-minute class which is held either immediately after or immediately prior to Sacrament meeting. Everyone 11 years of age and older are encouraged to attend; children under age 11 have Sunday School-style classes taught to them in Primary, with those classes administered by the Primary organization.

=== Structure of Sunday School ===
==== Local structure ====
Each congregation (ward or branch) has an adult male priesthood holder who serves as the local Sunday School president. The president is called by the local bishop (or branch president) and, under the bishop's direction, he oversees the Sunday School. The Sunday School president may submit names to the bishop who then typically calls two counselors and a secretary to assist the president. Other adults in the congregation will serve as instructors in the various Sunday School classes. A stake (or district) Sunday School presidency provides support and training to the local Sunday School presidents.

==== Church-wide responsibility ====
Under the direction of general authorities, the church's three-man Sunday School General Presidency oversees the program throughout the church. From 1979 to 2004, members of this presidency were general authority seventies of the church. In the church's April 2004 general conference, Thomas S. Monson of the First Presidency, announced that "a recent decision [has been made] that members of the Quorums of the Seventy [will] not serve in the general presidencies of the Sunday School and Young Men." Since that time, church general authorities have no longer served as members of the presidency.

Since April 2019, the following men have comprised the Sunday School General Presidency: Mark L. Pace, President; Milton Camargo, First Counselor; and Jan E. Newman, Second Counselor.

The Sunday School General Board also assists in the leadership of the church's Sunday School programs and in the development of guidelines, policies, and materials.

== See also ==
- Worship services of The Church of Jesus Christ of Latter-day Saints
- Young Men (organization)
- Young Women (organization)
- Relief Society
