= Anne G. Osborn =

American physician

Anne G. Osborn (born 1943) is an American physician who works at the University of Utah. She holds the William H. and Patricia W. Child Presidential Endowed Chair in Radiology at the University of Utah Medical Center.

== Biography ==
Osborn earned her M.D. at Stanford University. In 1977 the Ensign included an article by Osborn about being a single woman and also a member of a church that places marriage and family in order of priority just under discipleship to Jesus Christ. From 1989 to 1990 she worked at the Armed Forces Institute of Pathology.

In 1982 she married Ronald E. Poelman.

For a year, covering parts of 1988 and 1989, Osborn served as president of the American Society of Neuroradiology. In 1989 Osborn was the recipient of the Grubbe Memorial Award from the Chicago Radiological Society.

Osborn was the first female president of the American Society of Neuroradiology.

Osborn was interviewed for the 2007 PBS documentary The Mormons.

She has served on the general board of the Sunday School and Relief Society of the Church of Jesus Christ of Latter-day Saints.

In 1995 Osborn wrote an autobiography, The Simeon Solution. In 1997 her book The Amulek Alternative: Exercising Agency in a World of Choice was published.

In 2013 Osborn won in the physician category for her book Osborn's Brain the first place award from the American Medical Writers Association.

== Works ==
Diagnostic Imaging: Brain that Osborn wrote with Karen L. Salzman, is one of 7 books listed under the heading "fundamentals" that the American Association of Neurological Surgeons says that medical students and residents interested in a career in neurosurgery should review.

== Sources ==
- University of Utah bio of Osborn
- Amirsys Publishing bio of Osborn
- Hilary Groutage (November 17, 1995). "Now meet Anne Osborn Poelman - doctor, teacher, spiritual explorer". Observer-Reporter. Associated Press – via Google News.
