= Ronald E. Poelman =

Emeritus General Authority
- October 3, 1998 – November 19, 2011
- Called by: Gordon B. Hinckley

First Quorum of the Seventy
- April 1, 1978 – October 3, 1998
- Called by: Spencer W. Kimball
- End reason: Granted general authority emeritus status

Personal details
- Born: Ronald Eugene Poelman; May 10, 1928; Salt Lake City, Utah, United States
- Died: November 19, 2011 (aged 83); Salt Lake City, Utah, United States

Ronald Eugene Poelman (May 10, 1928 – November 19, 2011) was a general authority of the Church of Jesus Christ of Latter-day Saints (LDS Church) from 1978 until his death. In 1984, he delivered a controversial sermon in the LDS Church's general conference which he asked to redo to clarify some points. The church retaped and spliced this second version into the conference before publishing. It is also the version published in church periodicals.

== Biography ==
Poelman was born in Salt Lake City, Utah to a Latter-day Saint family. As a young man, he served as a Mormon missionary in the LDS Church's Netherlands Mission. He began his college studies at what is now California State University, Long Beach and later transferred to the University of Utah completing a degree in history. In 1955 he graduated from the law school at the University of Utah and in 1965 he graduated from Harvard Business School with an MBA degree.

Poelman lived in San Francisco, California and was a vice president of Consolidated Freightways. He was a bishop of the LDS Church over the Stanford Ward. Poelman also served in several other callings including in the Palo Alto Stake presidency. In April 1978, Poelman became a member of the church's First Quorum of Seventy. During his time of service, Poelman has served as a counselor to Hugh W. Pinnock in the general presidency of the Sunday School from 1979 to 1981 and from 1985 to 1986. From 1992 to 1994 he again served in the Sunday School General Presidency. In 1998, Poelman was released from active duties and granted general authority emeritus status.

Poelman was married to Claire, who was for a time a consultant with Stanford University. After she died, he married Anne G. Osborn, a doctor connected with the University of Utah.

At the age of 83, Poelman died of "causes incident to aging" at his home in Salt Lake City, Utah.

== Controversial sermon ==
In the October 1984 general conference of the LDS Church, Poelman delivered a sermon entitled "The Gospel and the Church". Controversy ensued when the version of his sermon that was published in the November 1984 Ensign magazine differed from the sermon Poelman had delivered orally.

According to Poelman's brother, after Poelman had delivered his sermon, it had been pointed out to him by apostles that the text of his talk might support claims that people do not need the LDS Church. In response, Poelman had revised the text of the sermon for publication in the Ensign and re-delivered the edited sermon on film. A "cough track" was included in the retaping to make it appear that the revised sermon was delivered in front of an audience. The church spliced the retaped sermon into the tapes of general conference prior to their distribution and archival.

One commentator has criticised the changes to the sermon as a dramatic shift in the meaning of Poelman's address:

"The rewriting and refilming of Elder Ronald Poelman's October 1984 Conference address, originally a rare and inspiring defense of free agency, so that it became yet another cry for obedience. His text was not edited — his ideas were turned inside out."

Poelman spoke again in general conference after four-and-a-half years.
