= Robert L. Simpson (Mormon) =

American LDS Church leader (1915–2003)

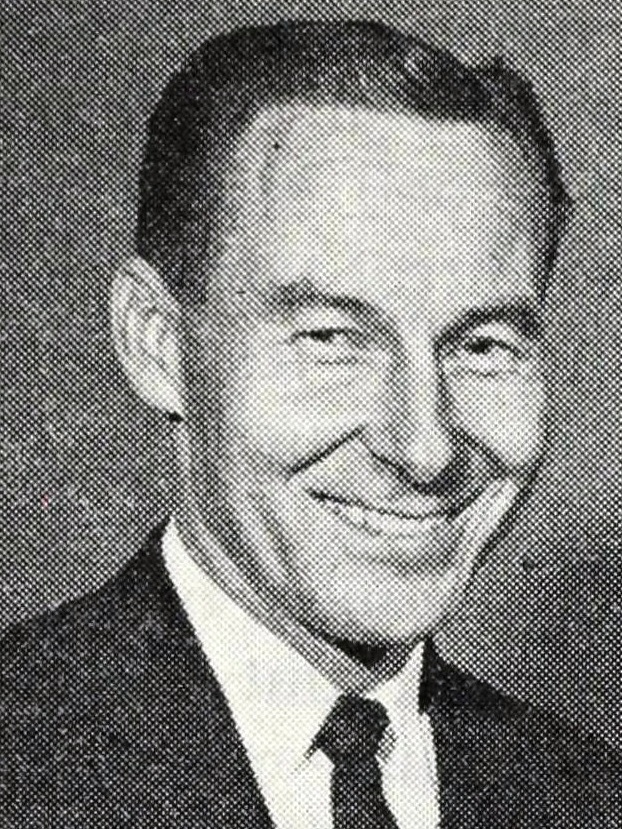
- Simpson in 1962, while First Counselor in the Presiding Bishopric

Emeritus General Authority
- September 30, 1989 – April 15, 2003

First Quorum of the Seventy
- October 1, 1976 – September 30, 1989
- End reason: Granted general authority emeritus status

Assistant to the Quorum of the Twelve Apostles
- April 6, 1972 – October 1, 1976
- End reason: Position abolished

First Counselor in the Presiding Bishopric
- September 30, 1961 – April 6, 1972
- End reason: Honorable release of John H. Vandenburg and his counselors

Personal details
- Born: Robert Leatham Simpson; August 8, 1915; Salt Lake City, Utah, United States
- Died: April 15, 2003 (aged 87); St. George, Utah, United States

Robert Leatham Simpson (August 8, 1915 – April 15, 2003) was a general authority of the Church of Jesus Christ of Latter-day Saints from 1961 until his death.

Simpson served as a missionary in the church's New Zealand Mission as a young adult. In the 1950s, Simpson returned to New Zealand as the mission president. Simpson was fluent in the Maori language.

Simpson studied at Santa Monica City College. He also was trained in the Technical Training Communication program held at Yale University during World War II. Following his service in the Air Force during World War II, Simpson worked for Pacific Telephone Company for 20 years. During his career in telecommunications, this included responsibilities as a plant engineer, public relations supervisor, and head of accounting. Simpson and his wife, Jelaire Chandler, were the parents of three children.

Simpson became a general authority of the church in 1961 when he was asked to be the first counselor to Presiding Bishop John H. Vandenburg. Simpson served in this capacity until he and Vandenburg were released and made Assistants to the Quorum of the Twelve Apostles in 1972. In this calling, Simpson was the managing director of LDS Social Services (now renamed Family Services) from 1972 to 1974. In 1974, he became the head of the Melchizedek Priesthood MIA. In 1975, Simpson became the temporary president of the church's London Mission, replacing a president who became ill. When the calling of Assistant to the Twelve was discontinued in 1976, Simpson was added to the First Quorum of the Seventy, where he served until 1989, when he was made an emeritus general authority and relieved of full-time church duties.

As a member of the Seventy, Simpson served at various times as managing director of the church's Temple Department, president of the Pacific Area, president of the Los Angeles California Temple, a member of the general presidency of the Young Men Organization, as president of the England London East Mission, and as general president of the Sunday School.

Simpson died in St. George, Utah.

== Notes ==
The Church of Jesus Christ of Latter-day Saints titles
Emeritus General Authority; September 30, 1989 – April 15, 2003; First Quorum of the Seventy; October 1, 1976 – September 30, 1989; Assistant to the Quorum of the Twelve Apostles; April 6, 1972 – October 1, 1976
Preceded by Hugh W. Pinnock	Sunday School General President; 1986 – 1989	Succeeded by Hugh W. Pinnock
Preceded by Rex D. Pinegar	Second Counselor in the Young Men General Presidency; 1985 – 1986	Succeeded by Hartman Rector, Jr.
Preceded by Thorpe B. Isaacson	First Counselor in the Presiding Bishopric; September 30, 1961 – April 6, 1972	Succeeded by H. Burke Peterson
