= David Lawrence McKay =

David Lawrence McKay (September 30, 1901 – October 27, 1993) was the eighth general superintendent of the Sunday School of the Church of Jesus Christ of Latter-day Saints (LDS Church) from 1966 to 1971. McKay was a member of the general superintendency of that organization from 1949 to 1971.

McKay was born in Ogden, Utah, the oldest son of future LDS Church apostle and church president, David O. McKay. David L. McKay became the second assistant to George R. Hill, the general superintendent of the Deseret Sunday School Union in 1949. In 1952, he became Hill's first assistant, where he served until 1966 when succeeded Hill as general superintendent. McKay was released in 1971 and was succeeded by Russell M. Nelson.

In the late 1960s, when his father was president of the LDS Church and ill, McKay often read his father's sermons in general conference. He also served as a mission president in the church's Eastern States Mission, based in New York City. While in this capacity he represented the church at a hearing on a constitutional amendment to overturn Roe v. Wade, expressing the church's support for the amendment.

McKay died in Salt Lake City, Utah, at the age of 92. He was married to Mildred Dean Calderwood.

== See also ==
- A. Hamer Reiser
- Royden G. Derrick
