= George R. Hill =

American educator (1884–1971)

George Richard Hill Jr. (April 10, 1884 – August 13, 1971) was an American educational administrator and was the seventh general superintendent of the Sunday School organization of the Church of Jesus Christ of Latter-day Saints (LDS Church) from 1949 to 1966. Hill was a member of the general superintendency of the LDS Church Sunday School from 1934 to 1966.

== Biography ==
Hill was born in Ogden, Utah Territory, and was raised on a farm in Springville, Utah. Hill obtained a B.S. degree from Brigham Young University in 1907, a B.S.A. degree from the Utah State Agricultural College in 1908, and a Ph.D. from Cornell University in 1912. After his graduation from Cornell, Hill became the director of the School of Agriculture at Utah State University.

From 1926 to 1935, he was a member of the general board of the LDS Church's Young Men's Mutual Improvement Association. He had also become a member of the general board of the Deseret Sunday School Union in 1925. In 1934, he became the second assistant to George D. Pyper, the general superintendent of the Deseret Sunday School Union. In 1943, when Milton Bennion succeeded Pyper, Hill became Bennion's first assistant. In 1949, Hill succeeded Bennion and became the seventh general superintendent of the Deseret Sunday School Union, a position he held until 1966, when he was succeeded by David Lawrence McKay.

Hill was married to Elizabeth Odette McKay, the sister of LDS Church president David O. McKay. Hill's oldest son, George R. Hill III, was a general authority of the church between 1987 and 1992. Hill died in Salt Lake City, Utah.

== See also ==
- A. Hamer Reiser
