= George D. Pyper =

American LDS Church figure (1860-1943)

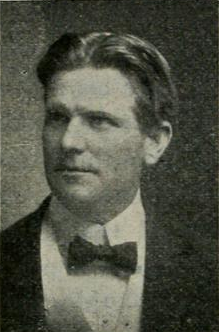
- Born: November 21, 1860; Salt Lake City, Utah
- Died: January 16, 1943 (aged 82); Salt Lake City, Utah
- Known for: Manager of the Salt Lake Theatre and the Mormon Tabernacle Choir, president of the LDS Church Sunday School organization

George Dollinger Pyper (November 21, 1860 – January 16, 1943) was the fifth general superintendent of the Sunday School of the Church of Jesus Christ of Latter-day Saints (LDS Church), a member and manager of the Mormon Tabernacle Choir, and the editor of a number of Latter Day Saint periodicals.

Pyper was born in Salt Lake City, Utah Territory. In 1896 and 1897, he was a missionary for the LDS Church in the Eastern States Mission of the church.

== Church Sunday School leadership ==
In 1918, Pyper was asked by apostle David O. McKay, the general superintendent of the Deseret Sunday School Union (as the church's Sunday School organization was then called), to be his second assistant. Pyper served in this capacity until 1934, when McKay was released and Pyper was called as the fifth general superintendent of the Sunday School. Pyper was the first person to occupy this position who was not either President of the Church or a member of the Quorum of the Twelve Apostles. Pyper's assistants were Milton Bennion and George R. Hill, both of whom went on to serve as general Sunday School superintendents.

In 1890 and 1891, Pyper was an associate editor of The Contributor, a periodical targeted at Latter-day Saint adolescents. Beginning in 1910, Pyper became the editor of The Juvenile Instructor, the LDS Church Sunday School's official periodical. When the Juvenile Instructor folded and was replaced by The Instructor, Pyper became the first editor of the new publication, a position he held until his death.

== Performing arts ==
A talented singer, Pyper was the leading tenor in the Salt Lake Opera Company for many years. He was a member of and the manager of the Mormon Tabernacle Choir. In 1911, Pyper managed a 6000-mile American tour for the choir, wherein they performed in Madison Square Gardens and at the White House for U.S. President William Howard Taft. In 1929, Pyper became the chair of the LDS Church's Pageant Committee, which produced the performance The Message for the Ages as a celebration of the church's centennial. At the age of 80, Pyper was a technical advisor to the producers of the 1940 Hollywood film Brigham Young; Pyper had known Young prior to his death in 1877.

Pyper was also the manager of the Salt Lake Theatre from around 1898 until its closure in 1928. In the introduction of his history of the institution, The Romance of an Old Playhouse, Pyper related that Heber J. Grant, at that time the theatre's controlling owner, offered him a choice between managing Grant's insurance company and managing the theatre. Pyper responded, "I would rather be manager of the Salt Lake Theatre than anything else on earth!" As manager, Pyper kept an extensive collection of photographs of performers; the collection is currently held by the J. Willard Marriott Library at the University of Utah.

In compiling material related to history and the arts, Pyper went on to publish the book Stories of Latter-day Saint Hymns in 1939. This presented stories behind the texts and tunes of 43 hymns contained in the church's current hymnal. His approach was continued and expanded by J. Spencer Cornwall and later Karen Lynn Davidson, who in turn produced similar volumes when the church released new hymnals in 1948 and 1985. Pyper also contributed to the hymnal himself, composing the music to "Does the Journey Seem Long?", a hymn written by then-apostle Joseph Fielding Smith (later President of the church) that first appeared in the 1927 edition.

== Personal life ==
Pyper was married to Emmaretta Smith Whitney and was the father of two children. Emmaretta was the daughter of Horace K. Whitney, who was one of the Salt Lake Theatre's early performers and played the flute in the orchestra.
