= Hugh W. Pinnock =

American religious leader

First Quorum of the Seventy
- October 1, 1977 – December 16, 2000
- Called by: Spencer W. Kimball

Presidency of the Seventy
- October 4, 1986 – October 1, 1989
- Called by: Ezra Taft Benson
- End reason: Honorably released

Personal details
- Born: Hugh Wallace Pinnock; January 15, 1934; Salt Lake City, Utah, United States
- Died: December 16, 2000 (aged 66); Salt Lake City, Utah, United States

Hugh Wallace Pinnock (January 15, 1934 – December 16, 2000) was a general authority of the Church of Jesus Christ of Latter-day Saints (LDS Church) from 1977 until his death.

== Early life ==
Pinnock was born in Salt Lake City, Utah. As a young man, he served as a missionary for the LDS Church in the Western States Mission. Pinnock graduated from University of Utah in 1958, where he became a member of the Sigma Chi fraternity and Owl and Key. In 1958, Pinnock became student body president at the University of Utah, following future senator Bob Bennett. Ten years later, Pinnock managed the successful senatorial campaign of Bennett's father, Wallace F. Bennett.

== LDS Church service ==
Prior to his call to the First Quorum of the Seventy in 1977 he served as a bishop, regional representative, president of the Pennsylvania Harrisburg Mission, and a member of the General Priesthood Committee on home teaching.

When Pinnock was called as the Sunday School General President in 1979 he became the first person since David O. McKay in 1934 to serve simultaneously as a general authority and as president of the church's Sunday School. He served as Sunday School General President from 1979 to 1986 and from 1989 to 1992. He is the only person to have served two nonconsecutive terms in that assignment.

Pinnock served in the Presidency of the Seventy from 1986 to 1989. He died in Salt Lake City from pulmonary fibrosis while he was serving in the presidency of the church's North America Southwest Area.

Pinnock helped arrange a $185,000 loan for document forger Mark Hofmann. When Hoffman was charged with murdering two people Pinnock paid the loan back himself.

== Publications ==
- Finding Biblical Hebrew and Other Ancient Literary Forms in the Book of Mormon (1999)

== See also ==
- Ted E. Brewerton
- Ronald E. Poelman
- Ric Estrada

== See also ==
- "Elder Hugh W. Pinnock of the First Quorum of the Seventy", Ensign, November 1977
- "Elder Hugh W. Pinnock of the Presidency of the First Quorum of the Seventy", Ensign, November 1986
