= Microclimate =

Local set of atmospheric conditions that differ significantly from the surrounding area

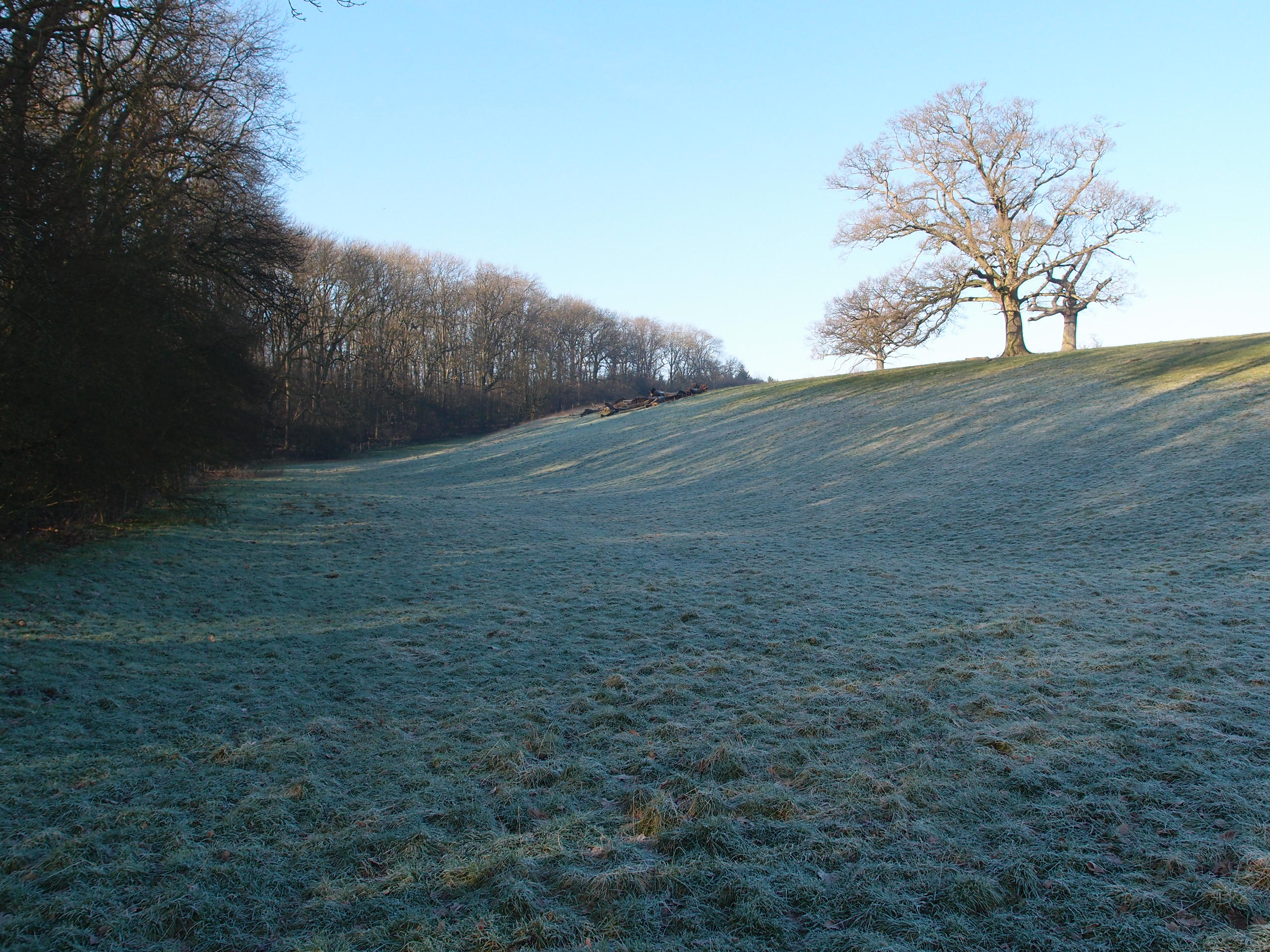
A small scale terrain depression which creates a frost hollow, due to localized atmospheric conditions.

A microclimate (or micro-climate) refers to localized atmospheric conditions in the near-surface layer, which includes the air immediately above a surface as well as the shallow soil and water environments below it. A microclimate can range in size from a few meters to at most a few kilometers across. It is characterized by a set of persistent, measurable differences in the climate conditions from those in the adjacent surrounding areas. These differences may be subtle or pronounced when evaluated over a diurnal (day-night) or seasonal cycle.

Surfaces associated with microclimates include both natural and human made materials, on land and water.

Microclimates are directly caused by weather and climate processes. These processes can be shaped or influenced by contributing factors, such as topography, soil composition, vegetation structure and plant diversity as well as the mass of nearby objects, natural or human made.

Because microclimates are hyperlocal systems, scientific instruments and best practices accounting for the physics of heat transfer and the measurement of microclimate air temperatures are needed to produce accurate results.

Important applications of microclimate knowledge include, agriculture and microclimate engineering, climate change impact, reforestation planning, and energy management.

== Scales of climate ==
Climate is commonly described as a hierarchy of spatial scales which are nested and interrelated. Understanding the scale at which climate is measured and the relationships between the classifications, provides important context.

A Macroclimate is the climate of a large region, typically covering an area defined as hundred to thousands of kilometers. It is shaped by broad atmospheric patterns. Mesoclimates are nested within the macroclimate and are defined by the topography and features of an area. Mesoclimates range in size between tens to hundreds of kilometers. Microclimates are present at much smaller scales, mostly controlled by the properties of the area and energy exchanges.

As spatial scale decreases from macro to micro, the influence of local surfaces, shade, wind obstruction and moisture present become dominant and have significant influence on the related properties of weather.

Microclimates occur within the Planetary boundary layer, which is the lowest level of atmosphere directly influenced by dynamics on the Earth's surface.

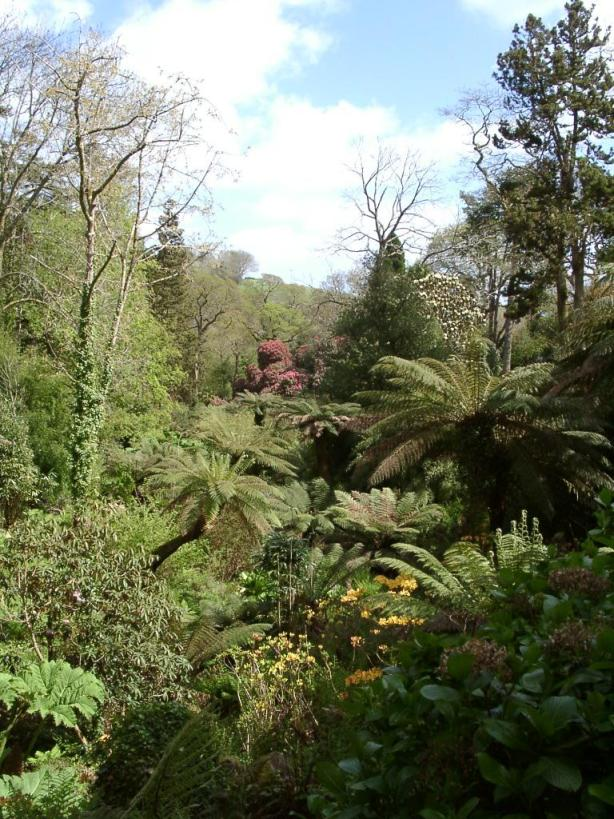
Tree ferns thrive in a protected dell area in the Lost Gardens of Heligan, in Cornwall, England, latitude 50° 15'N.

== Causes of microclimates ==
Microclimates develop when temperature and humidity are altered by exchanges of heat, moisture and air between the Earth's surface and the atmosphere.

These localized atmospheric conditions arise from differences in sunlight, heat, wind, and moisture near the surface. Terrain, vegetation, soil, water, and human-made features help shape and modify these conditions.

=== Direct physical processes ===
Fundamental physical processes which directly create microclimate variation are:

- Solar radiation and shading Solar radiation is the primary energy source creating microclimate formation. Shading from this radiation alters the amount of energy reaching the surface, resulting in variances of temperature.
- Wind (or obstruction of wind) Wind redistributes heat and moisture, which allows localized air masses to develop distinct temperature and humidity properties. When wind is obstructed the wind speed velocity is reduced, which preserves the local weather processes.
- Heat transfer and thermal properties of surfaces Surfaces differ in their ability to absorb, store, and release heat. Materials such as soil, water, rock and human-made surfaces have distinct properties that influence the surrounding air temperature due to conduction, convection, radiation and moisture content.
- Moisture, evaporation, and humidity Moisture and evaporation are influenced by soil, vegetation and nearby water. Areas with higher available moisture tend to have lower air temperature because evaporation transfers heat from the surface to the atmosphere.

=== Contributing environmental factors that shape microclimates ===
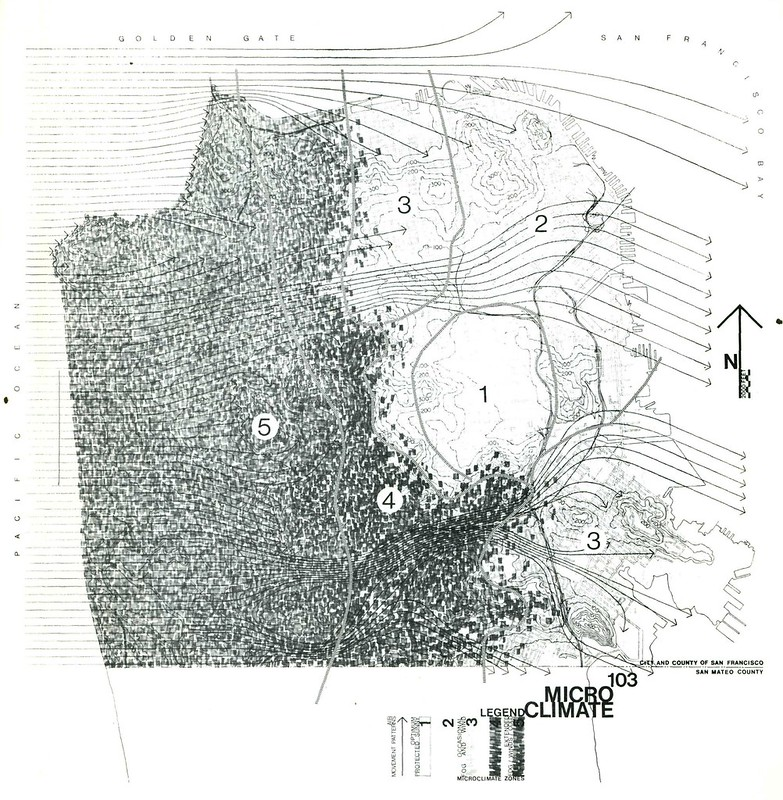
This conceptual diagram illustrates how terrain elevation, vegetation, and building mass structures can create sheltered conditions that influence localized atmospheric properties such as temperature, wind and humidity.

In addition to the direct physical processes, there are characteristics in the environment which can influence the development and persistence of microclimates.

- Topography Changes in terrain such as elevation changes or depressions can strongly influence the development of microclimates by altering sun exposure, wind patterns, and air pooling. Another contributing factor of microclimate is the slope or aspect of an area. South-facing slopes in the Northern Hemisphere and north-facing slopes in the Southern Hemisphere are exposed to more direct sunlight than opposite slopes and are therefore warmer for longer periods of time, giving the slope a warmer microclimate than the areas around the slope. The lowest area of a glen may sometimes frost sooner or harder than a nearby spot uphill, because cold air sinks, a drying breeze may not reach the lowest bottom, and humidity lingers and precipitates, then freezes.
- Land and water mass distribution Large bodies of water can influence microclimates by lowering the surrounding air temperature and increasing humidity.
- Soil properties The soil composition makeup affect microclimates through its ability to store heat and moisture. Soils made of components that retain moisture tend to moderate temperature fluctuations while soils made of components which dry easily produce higher daily temperature changes. The type of soil found in an area can also affect microclimates. For example, soils heavy in clay, retain heat and moisture which moderates the near ground temperature and humidity. On the other hand, if soil has many air pockets, then the heat could be trapped underneath the topsoil, resulting in the increased possibility of frost at ground level.
- Vegetation structure and plant diversity Vegetation and its structure has a significant impact on microclimates by modifying solar radiation and shading, blocking wind flow and supporting moisture retention. As pointed out by meteorologist Rudolf Geiger, not only does climate influence the living plant, but the opposite effect of the interaction of plants on their environment can also take place, which is ultimately known as plant climate. Plant diversity can further impact the microclimate by creating variety in the canopy structure and transpiration rates. This produces measurable differences in temperature and humidity.
- Human-made structures The physical features and properties of the built environment such as the building form, layout and surface materials can impact the surrounding temperature, humidity, and wind patterns by changing air flow, shading and heat storage. Urban areas often develop microclimates which are warmer than the surrounding region. This is the result of the use of building materials like concrete and asphalt, which absorb and store heat, while building mass reduces airflow and wind patterns. All of this has a considerable impact on the local microclimate. See also urban microclimates in the examples section.

== How to measure microclimates ==
The measurement of microclimates presents challenges not encountered with observing broader regional atmospheric conditions. Environmental conditions often vary considerably over short distances due to differences in shading, terrain, vegetation and surface materials. Measurements are also highly sensitive to placement, exposure and the design of the sensor itself. Temperature sensors record their own physical temperature which can be influenced by their materials, heat exchange, and solar radiation exposure. Instruments placed above the near surface layer may be subject to conditions which are different from the microclimate being observed. Due to these challenges, the accurate measurement of microclimates requires careful sensor placement, radiation shielding, and thoughtful analysis of observation data.

Microscale meteorology is the scientific field which studies atmospheric processes responsible for the creation of microclimates. It focused on processes which occur in distances as small centimeters to a few kilometers, which are the same scales at which microclimates exist. This field supplies the methods and techniques by which accurate microclimate measurement can occur.

Spatial resolution is a key concept related to understanding the measurement of microclimates. Because environmental conditions can vary dramatically over very small distances, microclimate observation often uses a network of sensors placed more densely than those in conventional weather station deployments. These networks allow localized atmospheric variability to be observed more accurately. Examples of these meteorological networks are mesonets and micronets, which consist of automated weather stations measuring air temperature, humidity, wind, and solar radiation. Observations are typically reported in frequent intervals, often every few minutes. The closely spaced sensors and frequent sampling provide the fine-scale, high-resolution data needed to characterize microclimate patterns.

Environmental monitoring is the systematic collection of data over time to understand conditions and detect changes. By continuously monitoring the microclimate over time it allows researchers to observe daily and seasonal fluctuations. This reveals how microclimates respond to changes in environmental conditions.

== Importance of microclimates ==
The study of microclimates provides important insights across multiple scientific and applied science fields by helping researchers understand how localized environmental conditions influence both natural and human-made systems.

- Agriculture and microclimate engineering Crop growth and yield are strongly influenced by localized conditions such as temperature, moisture, and plant stress. Microclimate management involves the modification of conditions to those which are optimized for growth and crop yield, such as the practices of irrigation, shading, windbreaks, and vegetation management, These modifications can help buffer crops from environmental extremes, such as heat and drought. As climate change increases the frequency and intensity of temperature extremes, microclimate management will play an important role in agriculture management.
- Climate change The microclimate conditions can alter species survival, migration, and the stability of the ecological systems. Human activities, such as land use and urban development, can further influence the environmental responses of a microclimate, shaping how climate change impacts the environment. Urban heat islands are a direct example of how human influences can amplify the conditions which affect climate change in an area, correlating to impacts on the environment and society.
- Reforestation efforts Environmental damage caused by natural and human-made disturbances can be mitigated through an understanding of microclimates. Microclimate conditions such as shade, moisture, and temperature influence seedling survival, growth and ecosystem recovery. These localized environmental conditions can improve the success of reforestation and ecological restoration efforts.
- Energy demand Building energy consumption is influenced by the surrounding microclimate, particularly local variations in temperature and humidity. In densely built environments, increased building mass, reduced vegetation and concrete surfaces can raise local temperature and increase cooling demand. Modeling the interaction between buildings and microclimates can improve urban planning and building design, helping to reduce energy consumption and improve efficiency.
- Animal habitat and behavior Microclimate conditions play an important role in determining habitat suitability for an animal species. Species survival, behavior, and migration patterns are influenced through variations in temperature, humidity, and vegetative shelter. As a result, microclimates are an important factor in shaping ecological communities and biodiversity.

== Examples of microclimates ==
The area in a developed industrial park may vary greatly from a wooded park nearby, as natural flora in parks absorb light and heat in leaves that a building roof or parking lot radiates back into the air.

In an urban area, tall buildings create their own microclimate, both by overshadowing large areas and by channeling strong winds to ground level. Wind effects around tall buildings are assessed as part of a microclimate study.

Microclimates can also refer to purpose-made environments, such as those in a room or other enclosure. Microclimates are commonly created and carefully maintained in museum display and storage environments. This can be done using passive methods, such as silica gel, or with active microclimate control devices.

Usually, if the inland areas have a humid continental climate, the coastal areas stay much milder during winter months, in contrast to the hotter summers. This is the case in places such as British Columbia, where Vancouver has an oceanic wet winter with rare frosts, but inland areas that average several degrees warmer in summer have cold and snowy winters.

=== Craters ===
The presence of permafrost close to the surface in a crater creates a unique microclimate environment.

=== Caves ===
Caves are important geologic formations that can house unique and delicate geologic/biological environments. The vast majority of caves found are made of calcium carbonates such as limestone. In these dissolution environments, many species of flora and fauna find home. The mixture of water content within the cave atmosphere, air pressure, geochemistry of the cave rock as well as the waste product from these species can combine to make unique microclimates within cave systems.

The speleogenetic effect is an observed and studied process of air circulation within cave environments brought on by convection. In phreatic conditions the cave surfaces are exposed to the enclosed air (as opposed to submerged and interacting with water from the water table in vadose conditions). This air circulates water particles that condense on cave walls and formations such as speleothems. This condensing water has been found to contribute to cave wall erosion and the formation of morphological features. Some examples of this can be found in the limestone walls of Grotta Giusti; a thermal cave near Monsummano, Lucca, Italy. Any process that leads to an increase or decrease in chemical/physical processes will subsequently impact the environment within that system. Air density within caves, which directly relates to the convection processes, is determined by the air temperature, humidity, and pressure. In enclosed cave environments, the introduction of bacteria, algae, plants, animals, or human interference can change any one of these factors therefore altering the microenvironment within the cave. There are over 750 caves worldwide that are available for people to visit. The constant human traffic through these cave environments can have a negative effect on the microclimates as well as on the geological and archaeological findings. Factors that play into the deterioration of these environments include nearby deforestation, agriculture operations, water exploitation, mining, and tourist operations.

The speleogenetic effect of normal caves tends to show a slow circulation of air. In unique conditions where acids are present, the effects of erosion and changes to the microenvironment can be drastically enhanced. One example is the effect of the presence of hydrosulfuric acid(H_{2}S). When the oxidized hydrosulfuric acid chemically alters to sulfuric acid(H_{2}SO_{4}), this acid starts to react with the calcium carbonate rock at much higher rates. The water involved in this reaction tends to have a high pH of 3 which renders the water almost unlivable for many bacteria and algae. An example of this can be found in the Grotta Grande del Vento cave in Ancona, Italy.

=== Dams ===
Artificial reservoirs as well as natural ones create microclimates and often influence the macroscopic climate as well.

=== Sinkholes ===
Examples of sinkholes and the associated cold air pool (CAP) effect are Gstettneralm Sinkhole in Austria (lowest recorded temperature −53 °C (−63 °F)) and Peter Sinks in the US.

=== Slopes ===
Another contributing factor of microclimate is the slope or aspect of an area. South-facing slopes in the Northern Hemisphere and north-facing slopes in the Southern Hemisphere are exposed to more direct sunlight than opposite slopes and are therefore warmer for longer periods of time, giving the slope a warmer microclimate than the areas around the slope. The lowest area of a glen may sometimes frost sooner or harder than a nearby spot uphill, because cold air sinks, a drying breeze may not reach the lowest bottom, and humidity lingers and precipitates, then freezes.

== Cities and regions known for microclimates ==
=== Americas ===
- Northern California above the Bay Area is also well known for microclimates with significant differences of temperatures. The coastline typically has daytime temperatures of 17 and 19 °C (63 and 66 °F) during summer months along that coastline, but inland towns not far from the ocean, such as Lakeport, can be as hot as 34 °C (93 °F) on an average summer day, in spite of being just around 40 miles (64 km) inland. Even as far north as the Klamath River valley around the 41st parallel north between Willow Creek and Eureka averages such temperatures, which is extremely hot for such northerly areas. At this parallel, the temperature at the coast is so cool that Willow Creek beats Eureka's all-time record temperature on average 79 times per year. This is in spite of the areas being less than 50 miles (80 km) from each other.
  - San Francisco is a city with various microclimates. Due to the city's varied topography and influence from the prevailing summer marine layer, weather conditions can vary by as much as 9°F (5°C) from block to block and a full 30°F (17°C) between the coastal fog belt and the heat island of downtown. The Noe Valley district for example, is typically warmer and sunnier than adjacent areas because the surrounding hills block some of the cool fog from the Pacific.
  - The region as a whole, known as the San Francisco Bay Area can have a wide range of extremes in temperature. In the basins and valleys adjoining the coast, climate is subject to wide variations within short distances as a result of the influence of topography on the circulation of marine air. The San Francisco Bay Area offers many varieties of climate within a few miles. In the Bay Area, for example, the average maximum temperature in July is about 64 °F (18 °C) at Half Moon Bay on the coast, 87 °F (31 °C) at Walnut Creek only 25 mi (40 km) inland, and 95 °F (35 °C) at Tracy, just 50 mi (80 km) inland.
- The Los Angeles and San Diego areas are also subject to phenomena typical of a microclimate. The temperatures can vary as much as 36 °F (20 °C) between inland areas and the coast, with a temperature gradient of over one degree per mile (1.6 km) from the coast inland. Hills and mountains can also block coastal air masses. The San Fernando Valley is usually much warmer in summer than most of Los Angeles, because the Santa Monica Mountains usually block the cool ocean breezes and fog. Southern California has also a weather phenomenon called "June Gloom" or "May Grey", which sometimes gives overcast or foggy skies in the morning at the coast, but usually gives sunny skies by noon, during late spring and early summer.
- The Big Island of Hawaii is also an area known for microclimates, as Kailua-Kona and Hilo, Hawaii, experience rainfall of 18 in (460 mm) and 127 in (3,200 mm) per year, respectively, despite being just 60 mi (97 km) from each other.
- Calgary, Alberta, is also known for its microclimates. Especially notable are the differences between the downtown and river valley/flood plain regions and the areas to the west and north. This is largely due to an elevation difference within the city's boundaries of over 1,000 ft (300 m), but can also be somewhat attributed to the effects of the seasonal Chinooks.
- Halifax, Nova Scotia, also has numerous microclimates. Coastal temperatures and weather conditions can differ considerably from areas located just 5–15 km (3.1–9.3 mi) inland. This is true in all seasons. Varying elevations are common throughout the city, and it is even possible to experience several microclimates while traveling on a single highway due to these changing elevations.
- Vancouver and its metro area also has many microclimates. North Vancouver and other regions situated on the mountain slopes get over 2,000 millimetres (79 in) of precipitation a year on average, while other regions to the south get around 1,000 millimetres (39 in), although they are less than 40 kilometres (25 mi) away. Temperatures in the Fraser Valley inland may be up to 10 °C (18 °F) warmer than the coast, while in winter they are several degrees colder.
- Chesapeake Bay is also known for its subtropical microclimate. It is most notable for its mild climatic effects on the area east and west of the lowlands of Maryland and Delmarva. Having over 64,000 square miles (170,000 km^{2}) of water; (most of which is a mix of fresh and salt water) creates higher levels of humidity and heat in the spring and summer months. An example of this effect is the survival of subtropical palm trees and plants such as water hyacinths in the area.
- Chile Chico and Los Antiguos on the southern shores of General Carrera Lake have favourable conditions for agriculture despite being in inner Patagonia.
- New York City and its surrounding metro area feature an extensive urban heat island, and influence from the Atlantic Ocean. These factors cause it to be the northernmost major city in the US that Köppen describes as humid subtropical, with the city being in the 7a/7b/8a USDA zones, compared to nearby cities south of it, which feature lower zones.

=== Europe ===
- The Ticino region in Switzerland has a microclimate in which palm trees and banana trees can grow.
- Gran Canaria is called "Miniature Continent" for its rich variety of microclimates.
- Tenerife is known for its wide variety of microclimates.
- Istanbul exhibits a multitude of distinct microclimates because of its hilly topography and maritime influences. Within the city, average summer mean temperatures range from 21–25 °C (70–77 °F) depending on proximity to the Black Sea, with more significant differences on certain days. Rainfall also varies widely owing to the rain shadow of the hills in Istanbul, from around 600 millimeters (24 in) on the southern fringe at Florya to 1,200 millimeters (47 in) on the northern fringe at Bahçeköy. Furthermore, while the city itself lies in USDA hardiness zones 9a to 9b, its inland suburbs lie in zone 8b with isolated pockets of zone 8a, restricting the cultivation of cold-hardy subtropical plants to the coasts.
- Leeds, located in Yorkshire, England, is known to have a number of microclimates because of the number of valleys surrounding the city centre.
- The central west coast of Portugal, similarly to California, has huge differences in summer temperatures from the surrounding inland regions. In less than 60 km (37 mi), average daily summer temperatures can vary through as much as 10 degrees Celsius/18 degrees Fahrenheit, from 21 °C (70 °F) in Peniche or São Pedro de Moel to around 31 °C (88 °F) in Santarém or Tomar. This phenomenon is caused by local upwelling created by the northern Nortada winds.
- The coastal areas in the Andalusia region of Spain has a microclimate. Further north along the coast, Cádiz has a summer average of 27 °C (81 °F) with warm nights, whereas nearby Jerez de la Frontera has summer highs of 33 °C (91 °F) with inland areas further north such as Seville being even hotter.
- Sorana, a commune in Italy's Pescia Valley with a microclimate considered ideal for growing the Sorana bean.
- The Nizza (Nice) district of Frankfurt-am-Main, Germany is a small area on the north bank of the River Main where wind shelter and sunlight reflected off the river produces a Mediterranean climate and supports one of the largest gardens of southern European plants north of the Alps.

=== Asia and Oceania ===
- Amman, Jordan, has extreme examples of microclimate, and almost every neighbourhood exhibits its own weather. It is known among locals that some boroughs such as the northern and western suburbs are among the coldest in the city, and can be experiencing frost or snow whilst other warmer districts such as the city centre can be at much warmer temperatures at the same time.
- Sydney, Australia, has a microclimate occurring prominently in the warmer months. Inland, in Sydney's western suburbs, the climate is drier and significantly hotter with temperatures generally around 3–7 °C (5–13 °F) above Sydney CBD and Eastern Suburbs (the coast), as sea breezes do not penetrate further inland. In summer, the coast averages at 25.9 °C (78.6 °F), while inland varies between 28 and 30 °C (82 and 86 °F), depending on the suburb. In extreme occasions, the Coast would have a temperature of 24 °C (75 °F), while a suburb 20 km (12.43 mi)) inland bakes in 36 °C (97 °F) heat. However, winter lows in the West are around 3–5 °C (5–9 °F) cooler than the coastal suburbs, and may provide mild to moderate frost. Within the city and surrounds, rainfall varies, from around 682.5 mm (26.87 in) in the far-west to 1,213.8 mm (47.79 in) at Observatory Hill (the east or the coast).

== Background and other uses ==
The terminology "micro-climate" first appeared in the 1950s in publications such as Climates in Miniature: A Study of Micro-Climate Environment (Thomas Bedford Franklin, 1955).

The term microclimate is also used in the healthcare industry. It describes the localized environment of the skin, specifically temperature, humidity and air movement and how it impacts wound care.

== See also ==
- Mesonet and micronet
- Microscale meteorology
- Terroir
