= Rosemary M. Wixom =

13th Primary General President
- April 3, 2010 – April 1, 2016
- Called by: Thomas S. Monson
- Predecessor: Cheryl C. Lant
- Successor: Joy D. Jones

Personal details
- Born: December 26, 1948; Salt Lake City, Utah, United States
- Spouse(s): Blaine Jackson Wixom, Jr. (m. 1970)
- Children: 6

Rosemary Mix Wixom (born 26 December 1948) was the general president of the Primary of the Church of Jesus Christ of Latter-day Saints (LDS Church) from 2010 to 2016. She was the twelfth general president of the Primary, the organization that is responsible for the instruction of the church's children ages three to eleven.

Wixom is a native of Salt Lake City, Utah. She attended Utah State University and graduated with a degree in elementary education.

== LDS Church Service ==
From 2006 to 2009, she served with her husband while he was president of the church's Washington D.C. South Mission. She served later served as a member of the general board of both the Primary and the church's Young Women organization.

Wixom was accepted as general president of the Primary at the church's April 2010 general conference. She succeeded Cheryl C. Lant, who had served in the position since 2005. Wixom selected Jean A. Stevens and Cheryl A. Esplin as her counselors.

In 2015, Wixom became the first female member of the LDS Church's Temple and Family History Executive Council—one of three executive councils of the church. Linda K. Burton joined the Priesthood and Family Executive Council and Bonnie L. Oscarson, who led the church's Young Women's organization, became a member of the Missionary Executive Council. In 2016, Wixom assisted in the open house for the new Provo City Center Temple. In 2017, Wixom was serving on the National Executive Board of the Boy Scouts of America when the LDS Church announced they would no longer participate in the Varsity and Venturing programs offered by the Boy Scouts of America and Scouts Canada beginning the following year.

Wixom was released as Primary General President in April 2016 and was succeeded by Joy D. Jones. From November 2017 until December 2019, she and her husband served as president and matron of the Salt Lake Temple. Wixom and her husband were released when the temple was closed for a four-year renovation.

== Personal life ==
Wixom married Blaine Jackson Wixom, Jr. in 1970. She and her husband are the parents of six children.

The Church of Jesus Christ of Latter-day Saints titles
Preceded by Cheryl C. Lant	Primary General President; 2010 – 2016	Succeeded by Joy D. Jones
