= Bruce D. Porter =

American Mormon leader

Second Quorum of the Seventy
- April 1, 1995 – April 5, 2003
- Called by: Gordon B. Hinckley
- End reason: Transferred to First Quorum of the Seventy

First Quorum of the Seventy
- April 5, 2003 – December 28, 2016
- Called by: Gordon B. Hinckley

Personal details
- Born: Bruce Douglas Porter; September 18, 1952; Albuquerque, New Mexico, U.S.
- Died: December 28, 2016 (aged 64); Salt Lake City, Utah, U.S.
- Spouse(s): Susan H. Porter
- Children: 4

Bruce Douglas Porter (September 18, 1952 – December 28, 2016) was an American political scientist, university professor, and general authority of the Church of Jesus Christ of Latter-day Saints (LDS Church).

== Biography ==
Porter was born in Albuquerque, New Mexico and attended Brigham Young University (BYU). He was a recipient of the David O. McKay scholarship. Porter married Susan H. Porter on February 2, 1977, in the Washington D.C. Temple. They are the parents of four children. His wife later became a counselor and president in the LDS Church's Primary General Presidency.

Porter attended Harvard University and received a doctoral degree in political science emphasizing Russian affairs. He spent a summer in the Soviet Union as an exchange student during his doctoral program. He worked for the federal government on the United States Senate Committee on Armed Services and as executive director of the U.S. Board for International Broadcasting. He worked for two years for the Northrop Corporation and worked from 1990 to 1993 as the Bradley Senior Research Fellow at the Olin Institute for Strategic Studies at Harvard University. He later taught political science at BYU. Porter was 6'7" tall and was known for his 'self-deprecating manner and penchant for compassion'.

== LDS Church service ==
In 1970, Porter interrupted his BYU studies to serve as a full-time missionary for the LDS Church in the Germany Central Mission, based in Düsseldorf, West Germany. Porter served in Germany under two mission presidents who were both native Germans holding United States citizenship, Walter H. Kindt and Rudolf K. Poecker. They served as consecutive mission presidents and had served as missionary companions in the immediate postwar period in what became communist East Germany. Kindt and Poecker had both been arrested a number of times by Soviet authorities because of their missionary activities, and Poecker used his time in Russian incarceration to learn the Russian language and tried to teach the doctrines of the church to any Russians he met. The stories that these two men frequently related to the missionaries under their supervision inspired Porter to change his university major to Russian Affairs.

In the 1980s, while a resident in Munich, where he worked for Radio Free Europe/Radio Liberty as a foreign policy specialist, Porter served as president of the church's Munich Servicemen's Branch. He later served as a bishop in Virginia, and after accepting a position of Associate Professor at BYU, he served as a counselor to Noel B. Reynolds in a student stake presidency.

Porter was initially called to the Second Quorum of the Seventy in 1995, but in 2003 was transferred to the First Quorum of the Seventy. Since being called as a general authority, he served in the presidencies of the church's Europe East and Salt Lake City areas. Other assignments as a general authority included time as Executive Director of the church's Correlation Department, and he assisted in coordinating the church's Middle East/Africa North areas from 2008 to 2014. That assignment was done from the church's headquarters in Salt Lake City. He also served on the church's Area Committee, with responsibility for tracking international issues of interest to the church. He was president of the church's Europe East Area, centered in Moscow, Russia from August 2014 to early December 2016, when he was transferred back to the church's headquarters.

Porter died from a pulmonary infection on December 28, 2016, at his home in Salt Lake City.

== Publications ==
Porter is the author of books and articles on politics, religion, Russian foreign policy, and international relations.

- The USSR in Third World Conflicts: Soviet Arms and Diplomacy in Local Wars 1945–1980 by Bruce D. Porter (Cambridge University Press, July 25, 1986, ISBN 978-0521310642)
- Red Armies In Crisis: Creating The Post-communist Order by Bruce D. Porter (Westview Press, May 6, 1992, ISBN 978-0892061754)
- War and the Rise of the State by Bruce D. Porter (Free Press, February 1, 2002, ISBN 978-1629722474)
- The King of Kings by Bruce D. Porter (Deseret Book Company, February 21, 2011, ISBN 978-1573458863)
