= Sharon Eubank =

Latter Day Saint religious leader (born 1963)

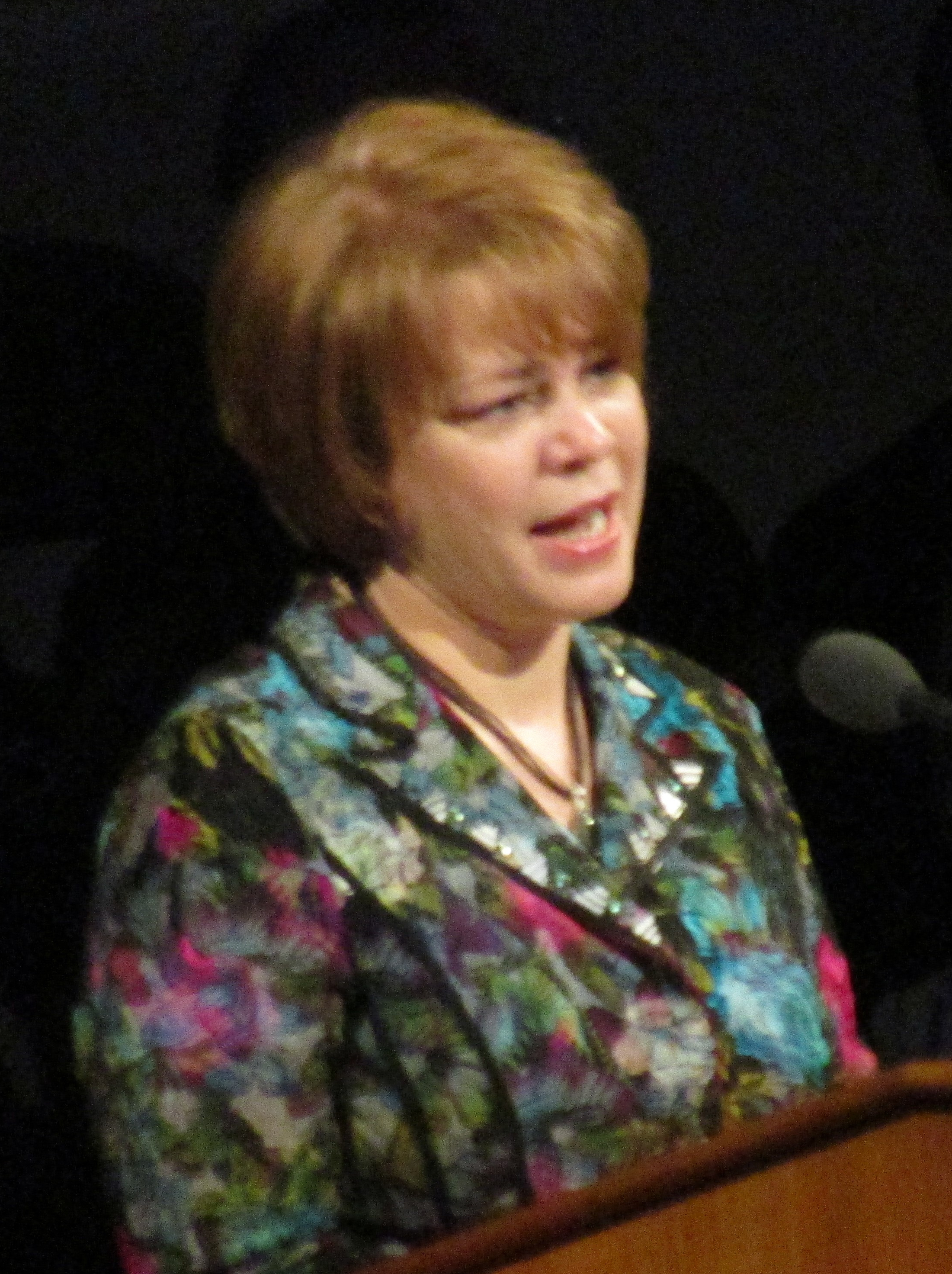
- Sharon Eubank in 2018

First Counselor in the general presidency of the Relief Society
- April 1, 2017 – August 1, 2022
- Called by: Jean B. Bingham
- Predecessor: Carole M. Stephens
- Successor: J. Anette Dennis

Personal details
- Born: October 4, 1963; Redding, California
- Alma mater: Brigham Young University
- Parents: Mark Eubank and Jean Tollack Eubank

Sharon Eubank (born October 4, 1963) is the director of Latter-day Saint Charities. She also served as the first counselor in the Relief Society General Presidency of the Church of Jesus Christ of Latter-day Saints (LDS Church) from April 2017 to August 2022.

== Early life and education ==
Eubank was born in Redding, California, to Mark Eubank and Jean Tollack Eubank, but was primarily raised in Bountiful, Utah. The oldest of seven children, Eubank grew up picking apricots and repairing sprinklers on the family's 10-acre plot of land. Eubank's father worked as a meteorologist for KSL and taught his children about weather. Eubank earned a bachelor's degree in English and History from Brigham Young University (BYU). She served as a missionary for the LDS Church in Helsinki, Finland, from 1984 to 1986. Eubank struggled to learn Finnish, widely regarded as one of the most difficult languages to learn. Eubank recounts, "I told the Lord, if you will help me to learn Finnish, I will always use it to serve you."

== Career ==
Upon graduating from BYU, Eubank accepted a position teaching English in Suzuka, Japan. After returning to the United States, she moved to Washington, D.C., where she worked for four years as a legislative aid to U.S. senators Alan Simpson and Jake Garn. "Working in Washington, D.C., was a tremendous education for me," Eubank said. "I learned so much about the nature of compromise in government. I learned that surprisingly most things get done through relationships."

Following her work in Washington, Eubank returned to Utah to start a business. She and her business partner sold educational toys and games for seven years before selling the business in 1998.

=== LDS Church employment ===
Eubank has worked for the LDS Church's Welfare Department since 1998. Early in her career she oversaw the establishment of LDS employment offices in Africa and Europe. She took a hiatus from LDS Church employment and lived in Paris, France, from 2005 to 2007. She says of this time, "I had burned the candle at both ends in a very demanding job. I needed something a little more quiet, so I moved to France for a time. I was single, I had 20 years left in my career. I wanted to ponder to know what the Lord wanted me to do next."

Returning to church employment in March 2007, she became the head of the Latter-day Saint Charities' Wheelchair initiative. In 2008 she became the regional director of Latter-day Saint Charities for the Middle East. She became the worldwide director of Latter-day Saint Charities in 2011. Since its founding in 1985, the organization has donated $2.3 billion worth of aid and assistance.

== LDS Church service ==
From 2009 to 2012, Eubank served on the Relief Society General Board, while Julie B. Beck was president. She served as first counselor to Jean B. Bingham in the Relief Society General Presidency from April 2017 to August 1, 2022. In 2017, she traveled to Uganda with Bingham at the invitation of UNICEF. In 2020, she addressed the G20 Interfaith Forum hosted by Saudi Arabia, discussing disaster response, food supply chains, and involving faith communities in emergency preparation and response efforts. In 2020, Eubank joined a CROP hunger walk for the Church World Service to walk in solidarity against hunger.

Prior to her general church callings, Eubank served in her local congregation as a ward Young Women president, Relief Society president, Sunday School teacher, and Primary worker.

=== General conference addresses ===
Eubank spoke four times in an LDS Church general conference:

- "Turn on Your Light," in October 2017
- "Christ: the Light that Shines in Darkness" in April 2019
- "By Union of Feeling We Obtain Power with God" in October 2020
- "I Pray He’ll Use Us" in October 2021

== Personal interests ==
Eubank enjoys spending time with her nieces and nephews. She also likes reading biographies, eating homemade pie, completing crossword puzzles, and camping.
