= Reyna I. Aburto =

American religious leader (born 1963)

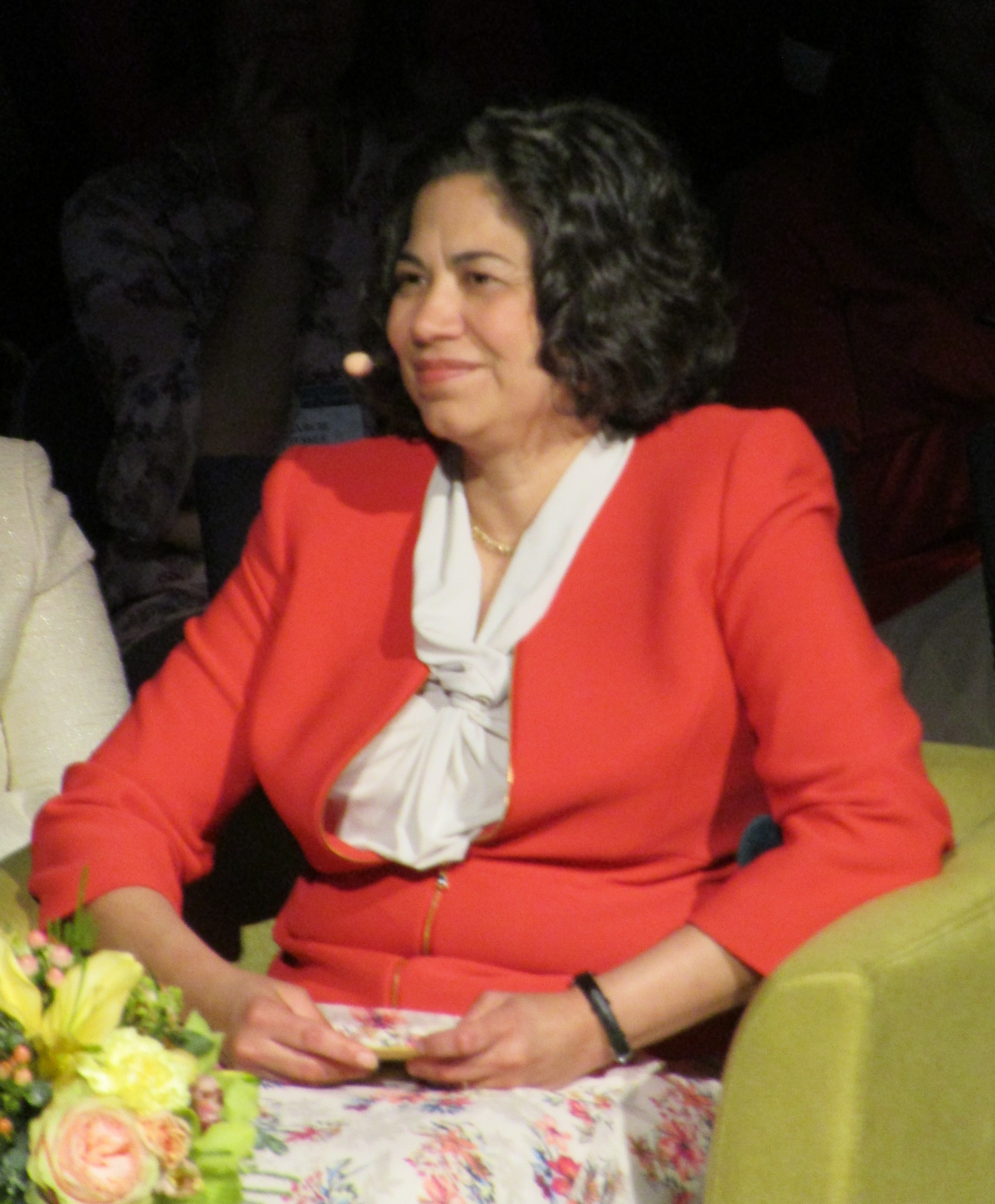
- Reyna I. Aburto in 2018

Second Counselor in the general presidency of the Relief Society
- April 1, 2017 – August 1, 2022
- Called by: Jean B. Bingham
- Predecessor: Linda S. Reeves
- Successor: Kristin M. Yee

Personal details
- Born: Reyna Blanco; October 1963 (age 62–63); Managua, Nicaragua
- Alma mater: Utah Valley University
- Spouse(s): Carlos Aburto
- Children: 3
- Parents: Noel Blanco and Delbi Cardoza

Reyna Isabel Aburto (née Blanco; born October 1963) is a Nicaraguan-born American religious leader, language translation specialist, and public speaker. She served as the second counselor to Jean B. Bingham in the Relief Society General Presidency of the Church of Jesus Christ of Latter-day Saints (LDS Church) from April 2017 to August 2022.

Aburto was born in Managua, Nicaragua, to Noel Blanco and his wife, Delbi Cardoza. She moved to California in 1984 as civil violence increased in Nicaragua. She joined the LDS Church in California in 1989 and moved to Utah shortly afterward. In 1993, she married Carlos Aburto, a native of Mexico, in the Jordan River Temple, and they are the parents of three children. She has a degree in computer science from Utah Valley University. She worked in the language industry for more than 25 years and owns a translation company with her husband.

Aburto's family attended Spanish-speaking congregations until 2013, when they began attending their neighborhood English-speaking ward. From 2012 to 2016, Aburto was a member of the LDS Church's Primary General Board. She has traveled widely as a counselor in the Relief Society General Presidency. In August 2018, she visited residents of a shelter in Guatemala built by LDS Humanitarian Services.

At the church's October 2019 general conference, Aburto spoke about issues of mental illness, including her father's death from suicide. In March 2020, Aburto was the keynote speaker at the International Women-in-Diplomacy Day Luncheon.
