= Joy D. Jones =

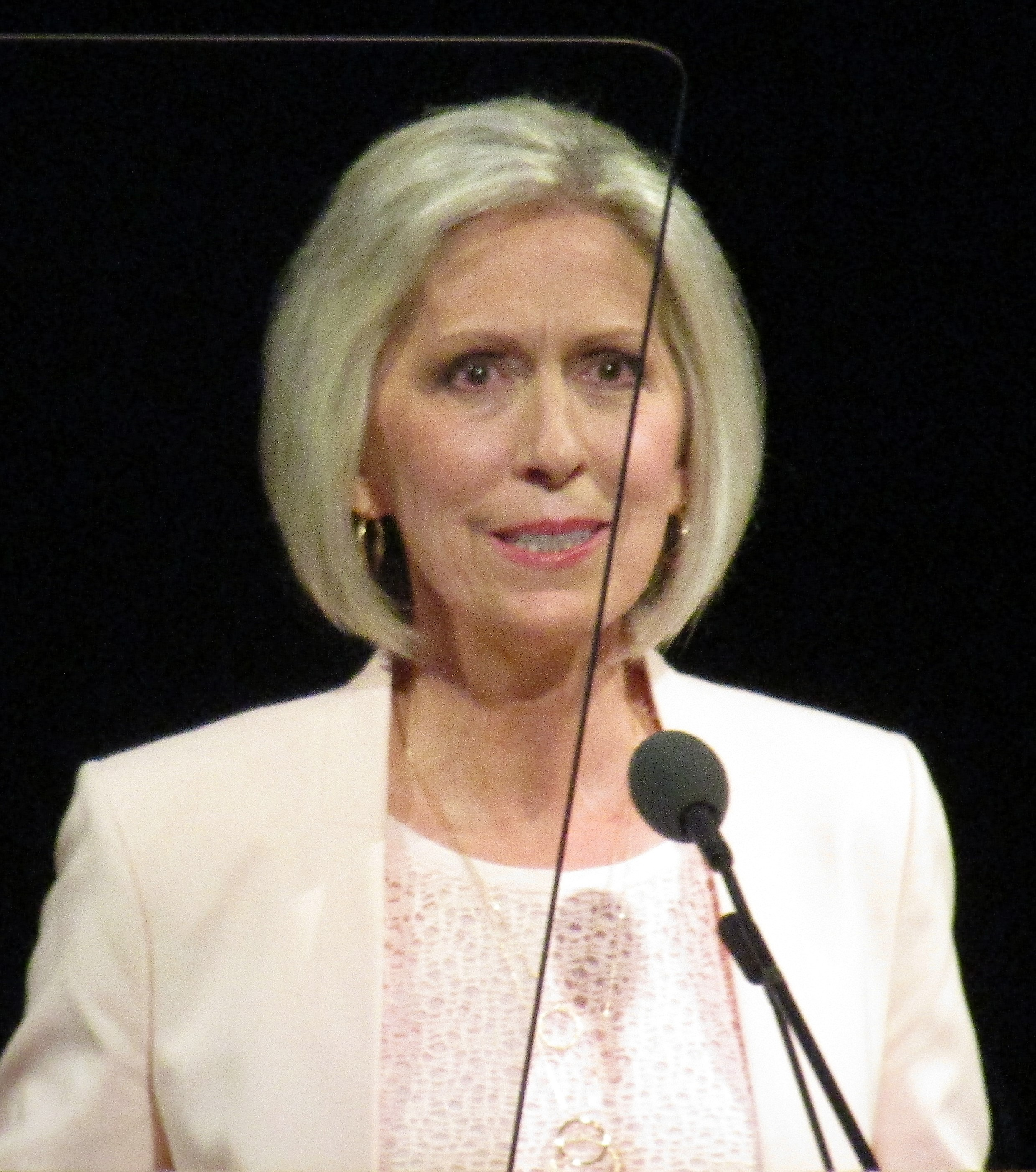
- Joy D. Jones in 2018

13th Primary General President
- April 2, 2016 – April 3, 2021
- Called by: Thomas S. Monson
- Predecessor: Rosemary M. Wixom
- Successor: Camille N. Johnson

Personal details
- Born: 20 July 1954 (age 71); The Dalles, Oregon, United States
- Alma mater: Brigham Young University
- Spouse(s): Robert B. Jones (m. 1974)
- Children: 5
- Parents: Aldo Harmon, Adelia Ellsworth Harmon

Joy Diane Harmon Jones (born July 20, 1954) was the 13th Primary general president of the Church of Jesus Christ of Latter-day Saints (LDS Church) from 2016 to 2021.

== Biography ==
Jones is a native of The Dalles, Oregon, and the daughter of Aldo Harmon and Adelia Ellsworth. Jones was raised in Oregon and her parents were among the early builders of the LDS Church in the region. The church was not deeply established in the area and she was raised in a branch that was part of a district. The event which most influenced her gaining faith in the LDS Church was a talk given by Robert L. Backman, who was then the mission president in the region.

Jones holds an associate of science degree from Brigham Young University (BYU) in family living. Jones worked as a dispatcher at the U.S. Forest Services dispatch center in Oregon. She also worked as an administrative assistant at the Federal Building in Provo and at a dermatology clinic.

Jones married Robert B. Jones in the Manti Utah Temple in 1974. They met while studying at BYU and have five children. Jones has lived in Texas, Oregon, California, and Utah. For 14 years, she lived in Santa Rosa, California, and in 1994, she relocated to Draper, Utah.

== LDS Church service ==
For six years prior to her call as Primary general president, Jones served on the Primary General Board. She has also served as a ward Relief Society president and in presidencies of the Relief Society, Primary, and Young Women organizations, at both the ward and stake level.

In April 2016, Jones was called to succeed Rosemary M. Wixom as the Church's Primary general president. She initially called Jean B. Bingham and Bonnie H. Cordon as counselors. When Bingham was called as Relief Society general president in 2017, with Cordon then called as Young Women general president in 2018, Jones concluded her service with Lisa L. Harkness as first counselor and Cristina B. Franco as second counselor.

In 2018, Jones was the keynote speaker at the Utah Coalition Against Pornography Meeting. In 2019, Jones participated in the first-ever 'Sister-to-Sister' question-and-answer worldwide live event as part of BYU's Women's Conference. Jones was selected to participate in the 2019 White House National Day of Prayer and was quoted, "We pray for the leaders of this nation. Bless them, protect them and grant them wisdom." Jones gave a commencement address at BYU–Idaho in July 2019. In 2021, Jones presented a $300,000 gift from the LDS Church and its humanitarian arm to the Utah Children's Justice Center to assist their 26 centers throughout the state that serve children of sexual or physical abuse. In April 2021, she was succeeded as Primary general president by Camille N. Johnson.

The Church of Jesus Christ of Latter-day Saints titles
Preceded by Rosemary M. Wixom	Primary General President; 2016 – 2021	Succeeded by Camille N. Johnson
