= Mark Eubank =

American meteorologist

- Born: Mark Edwin Eubank; June 10, 1940 (age 86); Redding, California
- Education: B.S. in Meteorology - University of Utah
- Occupation: Meteorologist
- Spouse: Jean Eubank
- Children: 7 children

Mark Edwin Eubank is a retired Salt Lake City, Utah television broadcasting meteorologist who served as chief meteorologist for the 2002 Winter Olympics.

== Career ==
Eubank joined the KSL-TV channel 5 Television news team in 1990 as their chief meteorologist. Prior to KSL, he was employed as a meteorologist for KUTV channel 2 in Utah, a position he had held since 1967. Eubank began his meteorology career at age 24 in Redding, California, at KRCR-TV. He attended UCLA and graduated from the University of Utah in 1972 with a Bachelor of Science in Meteorology. Eubank also owned and operated a weather consulting firm, WeatherBank, Inc. for 20 years.

== Distinction ==
- Eubank was famous for wearing a white sports coat throughout a broadcast preceding or during a snow fall.
- Indian weather lore such as a Thunder Moon and a Sun dog was often used in his broadcasts.
- He was known for his extreme enthusiasm for weather that would usually result in a variety of odd sound effects including: Bing, bowg, boink, boing, boiiiiing, bowk, hah, haaah!, (tearing sound), (squashed sound), ohhhh, goooomph, ziiiing, zoooom, (sound of car stopping suddenly), phhhht, eeerrrrrrumble-rumble-rumble, (slurping sound), sheeewhhhh, oh-oh, vooomph, voom, wonk, vooop, whhktw, waawaa, waaaa, waaam, and zeeek.
- "Never trust a split jet stream" was an often repeated phrase during his weather reports.
- Eubank also quoted John Ruskin regularly, saying "There is no such thing as bad weather, only different kinds of good weather."

== Career highlights ==
Eubank was the chief meteorologist of the 2002 Winter Olympics.

== Family ==
Eubank is the father of Sharon Eubank who was a member of the General Relief Society Presidency of the Church of Jesus Christ of Latter-day Saints from 2017 to 2022.

== Retirement ==
On November 29, 2006, Eubank signed off the air for the final time. He passed his job and white coat to his son Kevin Eubank. Shortly after retiring, he and his wife served two Latter-day Saint missions; first one year in St. George, Utah and then at the Laie Hawaii temple visitors center for three years where Eubank served as the director of the visitors center.

== Publications ==
- Mark Eubank's Utah Weather (1979)
- Weather Detectives: Fun-filled Facts, Experiments, And Activities for Kids (2004) Illustrated by Mark A. Hicks

== See also ==
- Peter Sinks

Preceded by Bob Welti	Broadcasting Meteorologist; 1967–2006	Succeeded by Kevin Eubank
