= Jean B. Bingham =

American Latter-day Saint religious leader (born 1952)

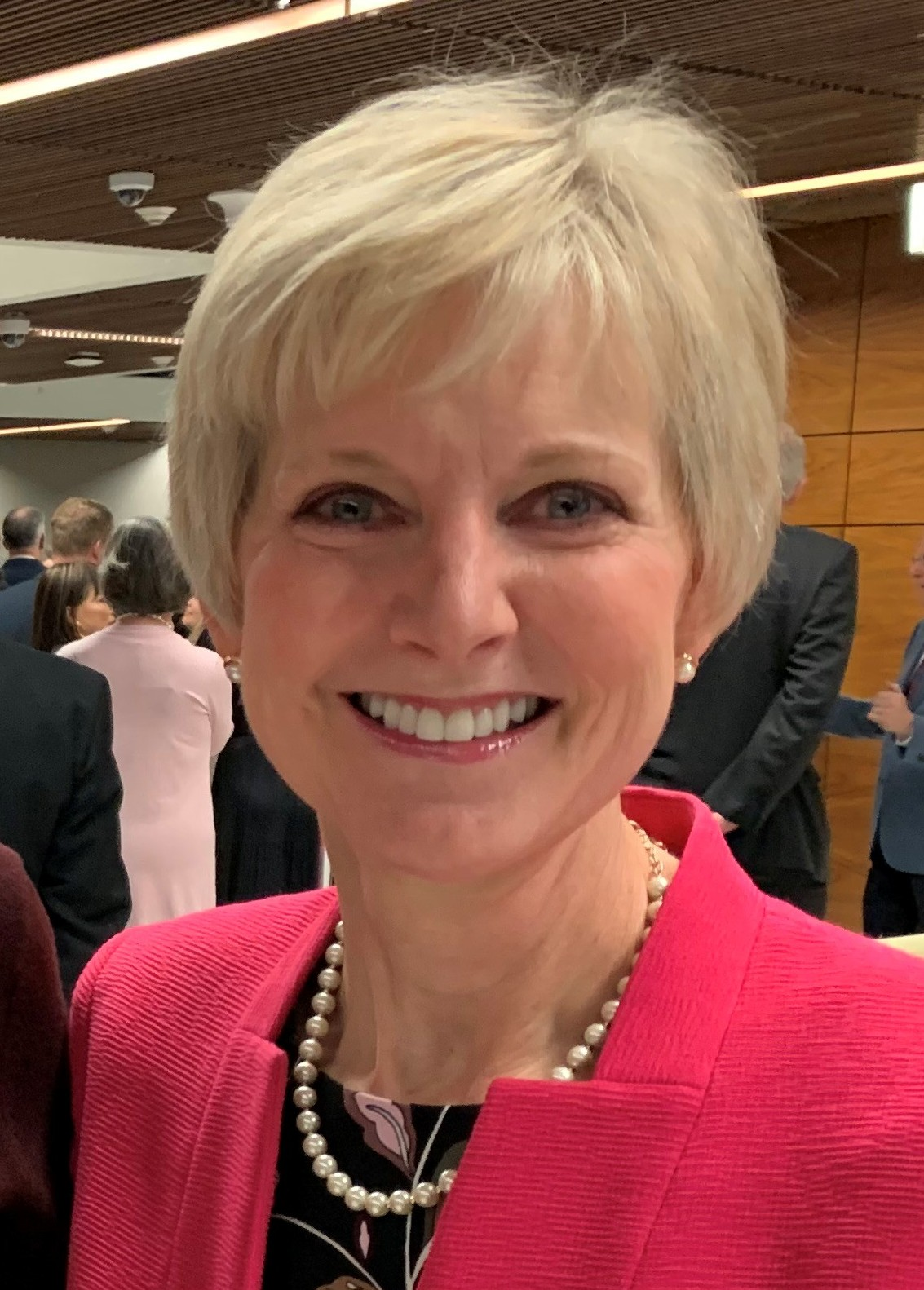

17th Relief Society General President
- April 1, 2017 – August 1, 2022
- Called by: Thomas S. Monson
- Predecessor: Linda K. Burton
- Successor: Camille N. Johnson

Personal details
- Born: June 10, 1952 (age 73); Provo, Utah
- Alma mater: Brigham Young University, National Louis University
- Spouse(s): Bruce Bingham
- Children: 2
- Parents: Robert R. Barrus and Edith Joy Clark

Jean Barrus Bingham (born June 10, 1952) was the 17th Relief Society General President of the Church of Jesus Christ of Latter-day Saints (LDS Church) from April 2017 to August 2022.

Bingham was born in Provo, Utah to Robert R. Barrus and Edith Joy Clark. Bingham was raised in New Jersey, Minnesota, and Texas. In Minneapolis, Minnesota, her father served in the LDS Church's local congregation as its bishop, and she did minor aid in helping build a new chapel. She lived in New Jersey during her high school years. She has an associate degree from Elgin Community College and another from Brigham Young University (BYU), along with bachelor's and master's degrees in teaching from National Louis University. After graduating, she moved to Illinois and also lived in Wisconsin. Bingham taught English as a second language and also worked as a nurse's aid.

== LDS Church service ==
In the LDS Church, she has served as both as a ward Primary and Young Women president and a counselor in a ward Relief Society presidency. She also served for a time as a stake Young Women president. She was also an early morning seminary teacher for 6 years and an ordinance worker in the Chicago Illinois Temple. She also served for six years as a member of the Primary General Board. In April 2016, she was called as first counselor to Joy D. Jones in the Primary General Presidency.

In April 2017, Bingham was called to succeed Linda K. Burton as Relief Society General President. She called Sharon Eubank and Reyna I. Aburto as her counselors, in what was called an 'unusually diverse' presidency. Bingham was selected to participate in the 2018 White House National Day of Prayer and was quoted, "This nation has been given relative peace and prosperity and we humbly ask thee to watch over those in harm’s way, protecting our freedoms in the pursuit of happiness."

Bingham helped unveil a completely redesigned and updated Relief Society website in 2019 that allowed women across the church to, as she explained, "access resources for hope and help, see what sisters around the world are doing and listen to inspiration for women on podcasts." In 2019, Bingham participated in the first-ever 'Sister-to-Sister' question-and-answer worldwide live event as part of BYU's annual women's conference. She visited the West African country of Sierra Leone from June 5 through June 16, 2019 to meet with members of the LDS Church there. Bingham was the keynote speaker at the International Women-In-Diplomacy Day in March 2021, emphasizing in her remarks that education is key for the success of women worldwide.

On August 1, 2022, Bingham was released as Relief Society General President and was succeeded by Camille N. Johnson.

== Personal life ==
Bingham married Bruce Bingham in the Provo Utah Temple in 1972. They have two children and fostered many children.

== Sources ==
- Deseret News bio of Bingham
- Provo Herald article on Bingham
- St. George News article on Bingham

== See also ==
The Church of Jesus Christ of Latter-day Saints titles
Preceded by Linda K. Burton	Relief Society General President; April 2017 – August 2022	Succeeded by Camille N. Johnson
Preceded by Cheryl A. Esplin	First Counselor in the Primary General Presidency; April 2, 2016 – April 1, 2017	Succeeded by Bonnie H. Cordon
