= Linda K. Burton =

Official of The Church of Jesus Christ of Latter-day Saints

16th Relief Society General President
- March 31, 2012 – April 1, 2017
- Called by: Thomas S. Monson
- Predecessor: Julie B. Beck
- Successor: Jean B. Bingham

Personal details
- Residence: Salt Lake City, Utah, United States
- Alma mater: University of Utah
- Spouse(s): Craig P. Burton (m. 1973)
- Children: 6

Linda Kjar Burton (born October 19, 1952) was the sixteenth general president of the Relief Society of the Church of Jesus Christ of Latter-day Saints (LDS Church) from 2012 to 2017.

Linda Kjar was born in Salt Lake City, Utah, to parents Morris Ashton Kjar and Marjorie Castleton, the second of six children. While in her adolescence, she accompanied her family to Christchurch, New Zealand, while her father served as president of the church's New Zealand South Mission. While in New Zealand, she attended the Church College of New Zealand.

She married Craig Palmer Burton in 1973. She studied elementary education at the University of Utah. She and her husband are the parents of six children. From 2007 to 2010, she served with her husband while he presided over the Korea Seoul West Mission.

Burton worked briefly as an LDS seminary teacher, and served previously on the general boards of the church's Relief Society and Primary organizations. As president of the Relief Society, Burton was an ex officio member of the church's Boards of Trustees/Education. In 2015, Burton became the first female member of the LDS Church's Priesthood and Family Executive Council (formerly Priesthood Executive Council, or PEC). In April 2017, Burton was released and succeeded by Jean B. Bingham, who had been serving as a counselor in the church's Primary General Presidency.

In 2019, Burton was called as matron of the Jordan River Utah Temple.

== Notes ==
The Church of Jesus Christ of Latter-day Saints titles
Preceded by Julie B. Beck	Relief Society General President; March 31, 2012 – April 1, 2017	Succeeded by Jean B. Bingham
