= Tracy Y. Browning =

21st-century American Mormon leader

Tracy Browning

Second Counselor in the Primary General Presidency
- 2022 – incumbent
- Called by: Susan H. Porter
- Predecessor: Amy A. Wright

Personal details
- Born: Tracy Yelaunde Adams; 9 October 1976 (age 49); New Rochelle, New York
- Baptism Date: 1992
- Known For: First Black woman to serve in a LDS Church general presidency
- Alma mater: St. John's University
- Spouse(s): Brady Browning (m. 1997)
- Children: 3

Tracy Y. Browning (born October 9, 1976) served as the second counselor of the Primary general presidency of the Church of Jesus Christ of Latter-day Saints (LDS Church) from April 2022 until July 31, 2026. She is the first Black woman to serve in an LDS Church general organization presidency and the first Black woman to speak in a church general conference.

== Personal life ==
Tracy Yelaunde Browning was born in New Rochelle, New York, to Clive Adams and Sharon Cox. She grew up in Jamaica until age 11. She then split her teen years between her father in New Jersey and her mother in New York. Her mother joined the LDS Church when Browning was 15 years old, and Browning joined the LDS Church the following year in 1992. She later studied at St. John's University. She met Brady Browning and the two were married May 2, 1997, and they have two children. Their first child, a daughter, was born prematurely. They later adopted a son. Browning worked in financial services for 15 years and is a director in the church's Publishing Services Department.

== LDS Church service ==
Since her baptism in 1992, Browning has served as a ward and stake Relief Society counselor and teacher, a Sunday School teacher, and in the Young Women's organization. Just prior to her call to the Primary general presidency, Browning was serving on the Relief Society general advisory council. Browning was sustained as the second counselor to Susan H. Porter in the church's Primary general presidency on April 2, 2022. Porter and her counselors, including Browning, concluded their service on August 1, 2026.
