= Utah Children's Justice Center =

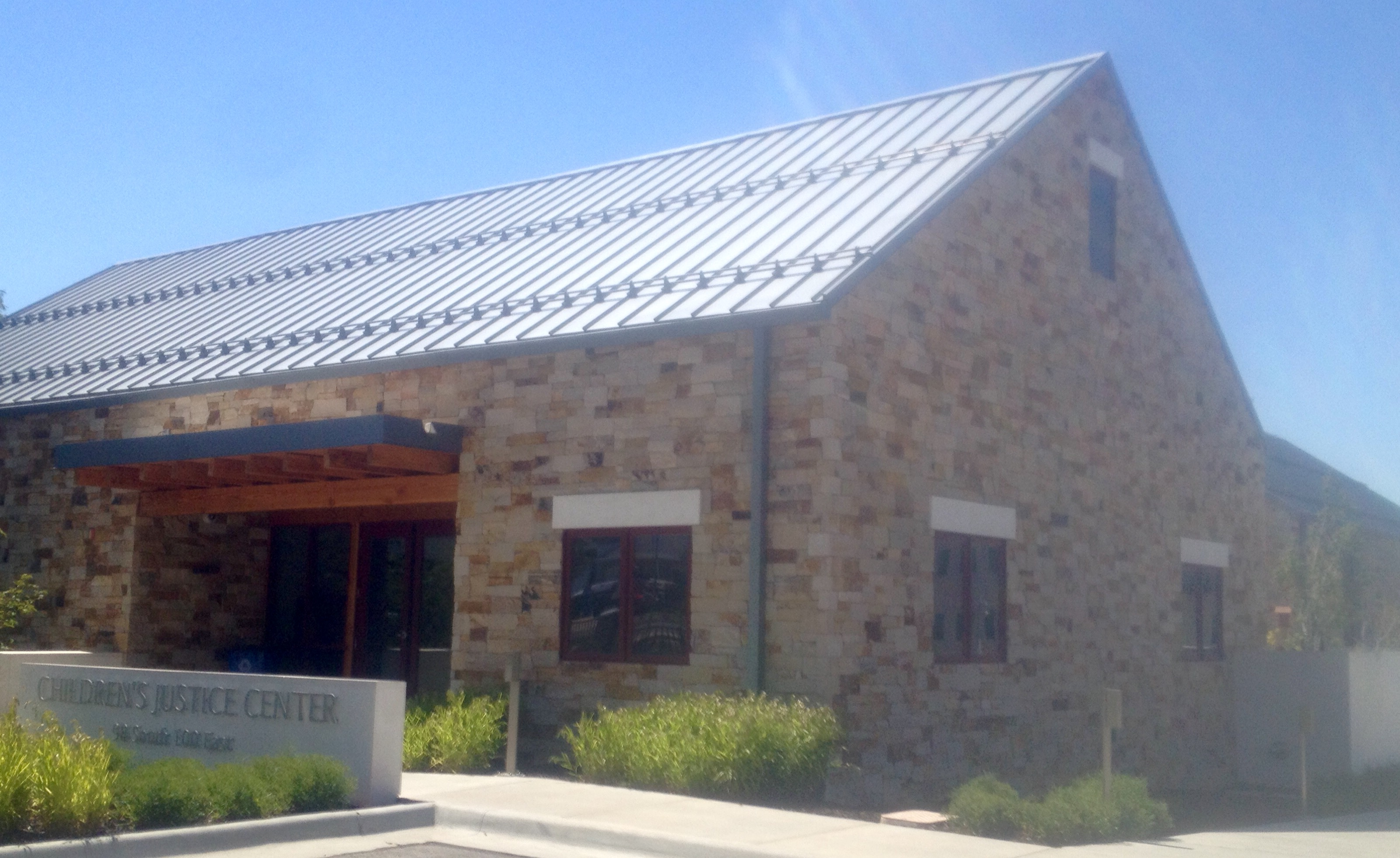
The Children's Justice Center in Davis County, Utah.

The Utah Children's Justice Center (CJC) is a program of the Utah Attorney General's Office to coordinate investigation and prosecution of child abuse, especially child sexual abuse. There are 26 CJC's in the state of Utah. They were created to provide a child friendly environment for interviews and exams of child victims as well as to provide support and centralized resource referrals to victim's families. In 2021, Joy D. Jones presented a $300,000 gift from the Church of Jesus Christ of Latter-day Saints (LDS Church) to assist their 26 centers throughout the state.

== Services ==
In 2018, the Utah Attorney General described the CJC as:

a child-focused, facility-based program in which representatives from law enforcement, child protection, prosecution, mental health, medical services, and victim advocacy work together to conduct interviews and make team decisions about investigation, prosecution, and treatment of child abuse cases. In an average year, Utah’s CJCs conduct 4,500 interviews, handle 5,500 cases, and serve as many as 15,000 people.

Prior to the creation of the Utah CJC, investigation of child abuse may have required a child victim to be interviewed by police, social services, medical personnel, psychologists and prosecutors. At the CJC, as Utah County's website explained in 2002, the interviews can be completed in a home-like setting by law enforcement or social service investigators. The purpose of the CJC is to provide a facility where children can feel more comfortable and receive coordinated services as part of the investigative process. Interviews are recorded for use in agency investigations.

The children's justice center provides many secondary services. These include:

- Medical forensic exams on-site at some centers
- Tracking and monitoring of cases through the criminal justice system
- Collaboration of resources among agencies involved in the investigation
- Community education presentations
- Referrals for mental health and other services

== Locations ==
Utah has 26 justice centers where child victims can be interviewed in a safe child-friendly environment. The centers help coordinate investigation and prosecution of child sex abuse cases. They also provide referral services to victims' families.

- Cache County CJC
- Salt Lake South Valley CJC
- Carbon County CJC
- Tooele County CJC
- Davis County CJC
- Uintah/Daggett County CJC
- Duchesne County CJC
- Utah County CJC
- Emery County CJC
- Summit County CJC
- Grand County CJC
- Washington County CJC
- Iron County CJC
- Weber/Morgan County CJC
- Salt Lake Avenues CJC
- Box Elder County CJC
- San Juan County CJC
- Sanpete County CJC
- Sevier County CJC
- Wasatch County CJC
- Kane County CJC
- Beaver County CJC
