= Susan H. Porter =

American religious leader (born 1955)

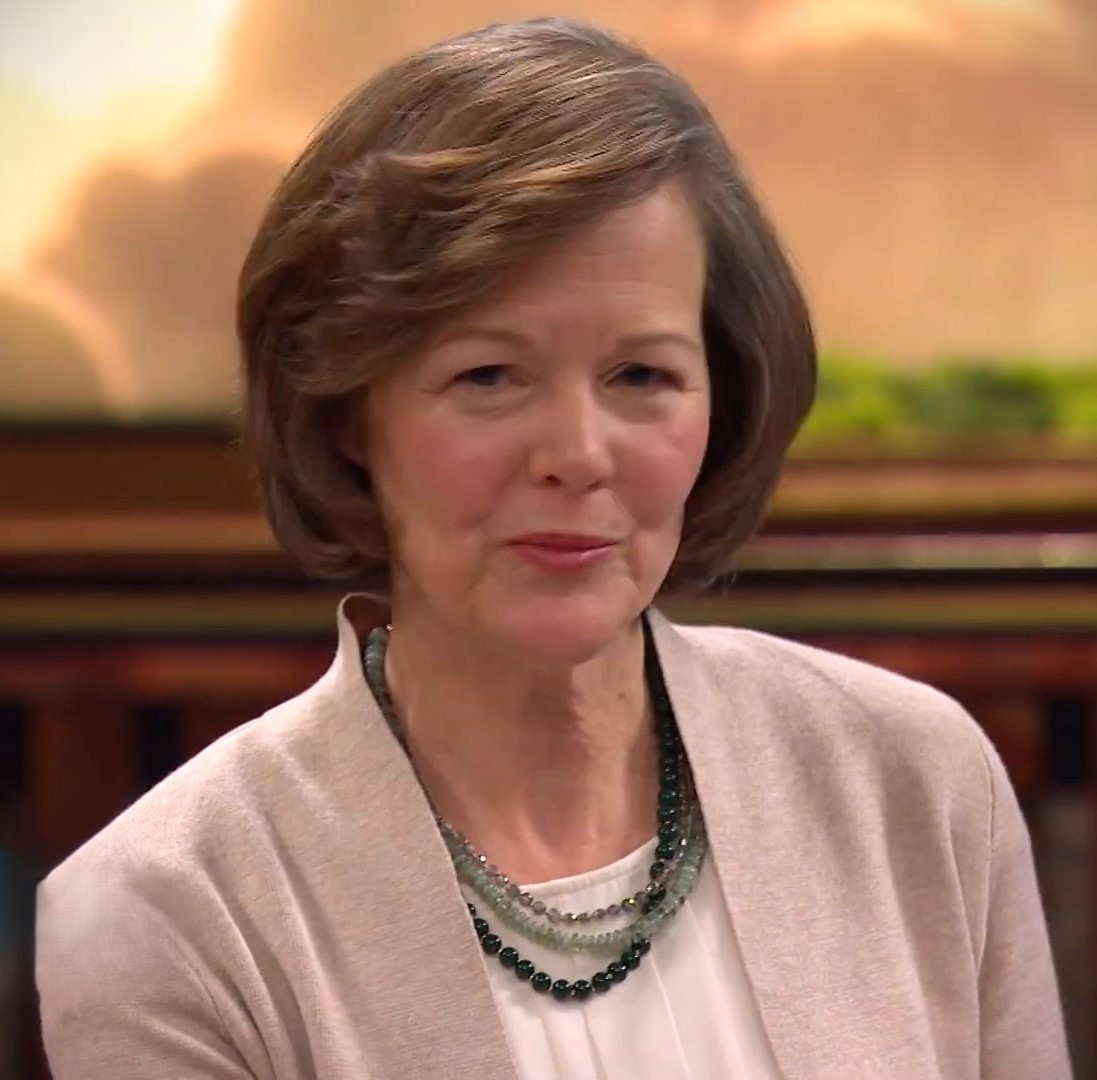
- Porter in 2022

15th Primary General President
- August 1, 2022 – August 1, 2026
- Called by: Russell M. Nelson
- Predecessor: Camille N. Johnson
- Successor: Rosemary K. Chibota

Personal details
- Born: 31 July 1955 (age 71); Ponca City, Oklahoma, United States
- Alma mater: Brigham Young University
- Spouse(s): Bruce D. Porter (m. 1977)
- Children: 4

Susan H. Porter (born July 31, 1955) served as the 15th Primary general president of the Church of Jesus Christ of Latter-day Saints (LDS Church) from August 2022 to August 2026.

== Biography ==
Porter is the daughter of Hans J. Holland and Charlene Coleman. She is a native of Ponca City, Oklahoma, and grew up in New York. She earned a bachelor's degree in chemistry from Brigham Young University (BYU). She has a diverse professional background, having served as a lab assistant at the Massachusetts Institute of Technology and as a mathematics teacher. She also volunteered in schools and collaborated with various community organizations.

She married the late Bruce D. Porter in the Washington D.C. Temple in 1977. He later served as an LDS Church general authority. He died in 2016 of kidney failure. They have four children, who all attended BYU.

== LDS Church service ==
For one year prior to her call as Primary general president, Porter served as first counselor in the Primary General Presidency. She served previously as a counselor in a stake Relief Society presidency and as both a ward Relief Society and Young Women president.

In April 2022, Porter was sustained to succeed Camille N. Johnson as the church's Primary general president, effective on August 1, 2022. Amy A. Wright was sustained as her first counselor, with Tracy Y. Browning as the second counselor. Browning is the first Black woman to serve in a church-wide presidency.

The LDS Church is introducing a new hymnbook, entitled “Hymns–for Home and Church,” and Porter is serving as an advisor on the project, with a rollout in the first half of 2024 in English, Spanish, Portuguese and French.

During the church's April 2026 general conference, it was announced that Porter and her counselors would be released on 1 August 2026.

== See also ==
- List of general officers of The Church of Jesus Christ of Latter-day Saints

The Church of Jesus Christ of Latter-day Saints titles
Preceded by Camille N. Johnson	Primary General President; 2022 – Current	Succeeded by Rosemary K. Chibota
