= Camille N. Johnson =

American LDS leader

18th Relief Society General President
- August 1, 2022
- Called by: Russell M. Nelson
- Predecessor: Jean B. Bingham

14th Primary General President
- April 3, 2021 – August 1, 2022
- Called by: Russell M. Nelson
- Predecessor: Joy D. Jones
- Successor: Susan H. Porter

Personal details
- Born: September 12, 1963 (age 62); Pocatello, Idaho, United States
- Alma mater: University of Utah (BA, JD)
- Spouse(s): Douglas R. Johnson (m. 1987)
- Children: 3

Camille Neddo Johnson (born September 12, 1963) is an American religious leader and lawyer serving since 2022 as the 18th Relief Society General President of the Church of Jesus Christ of Latter-day Saints (LDS Church). She previously served as the church's 14th Primary General President from April 2021 to August 2022.

== Biography ==
Johnson was born on September 12, 1963, in Pocatello, Idaho. She graduated from the University of Utah in 1985 with a Bachelor of Arts in English literature and from the university's S.J. Quinney College of Law in 1989 with a Juris Doctor. Johnson worked as a lawyer for more than 30 years, most recently with Snow, Christensen & Martineau. In her legal career, Johnson worked as an advisor and litigator on issues including risk management, employment claims, Fair Labor Standards Act, ADA, whistle-blowing, procedural due process, and pharmaceutical defense.

== LDS Church service ==
From 2016 to 2019, Johnson and her husband served as leaders of the Peru Arequipa Mission. In the Primary general presidency, Susan H. Porter and Amy Wright served as Johnson's first and second counselors, respectively.

On August 1, 2022, Johnson transitioned from being the general president of the Primary to having the same title in the Relief Society organization. She was succeeded in the Primary by Porter. J. Anette Dennis and Kristin M. Yee are serving as her counselors in the Relief Society general presidency.

== Personal life ==
Johnson married Douglas R. Johnson in 1987 and they are the parents of three children.

== See also ==
- List of general officers of The Church of Jesus Christ of Latter-day Saints

The Church of Jesus Christ of Latter-day Saints titles
Preceded by Joy D. Jones	Primary General President; April 2021 – August 2022	Succeeded by Susan H. Porter

The Church of Jesus Christ of Latter-day Saints titles
Preceded by Jean B. Bingham	Relief Society General President; August 2022 –
