= Colleen B. Lemmon =

Mormon counselor

Colleen Bushman Lemmon (July 14, 1927 – August 15, 2012) was a counselor in the general presidency of the Primary of the Church of Jesus Christ of Latter-day Saints (LDS Church) from 1974 to 1980. She had previously served on the general board of the Primary from 1971 to 1974. In the general presidency, she was the second counselor to Naomi M. Shumway from 1974 to 1977 and the first counselor from 1977 to 1980.

Colleen Bushman was born in Salt Lake City, Utah. She was raised in Salt Lake City and later Albuquerque, New Mexico during her teenage years. In 1945 she married George Van Lemmon in Raleigh, North Carolina; they were later sealed in the Arizona Temple. They were the parents of four children. One daughter, Celia "Susie" Lemmon, died of polio in 1952 at the age of four. Lemmon also served as a stake Relief Society president in Albuquerque, New Mexico, where her husband also served as a stake president.

Lemmon died at Salt Lake City, Utah. She was buried in the Salt Lake City Cemetery next to her husband and daughter.
