= Peter Sinks =

Natural sinkhole in Utah, United States

- Floor elevation: 8,117 ft (2,474 m)
- Depth: 400–500 ft (120–150 m)

Geography
- Country: United States
- State: Utah
- County: Cache
- Coordinates: 41°54′45″N 111°31′7″W
- Topo map: Tony Grove Creek

Location
- Interactive map of Peter Sinks

Peter Sinks is a natural sinkhole in northern Utah that is one of the coldest places in the contiguous United States.

Peter Sinks is located 8,100 feet (2,500 m) above sea level, in the Bear River Mountains about 20 miles (32 km) northeast of Logan, within the Wasatch-Cache National Forest. Due to temperature inversions that trap cold nighttime air, it routinely produces the lowest temperatures in the contiguous United States. Even in the summer, the bottom of the sinkhole rarely goes four consecutive days without freezing. It remains so cold near the bottom of the hole that trees are unable to grow, leading to a sparse ground cover of mostly soil, shrubs, grasses, and rocks.

== Geology ==
Peter Sinks lies within the Bear River Mountains of Northern Utah. Composed primarily of limestone and dolomite, water flowing through the groundwater system of the mountain range erodes portions of the material to create caverns by dissolving material within the carbonate rocks. Once these voids reach a large enough size, the ground above will collapse into them to create sinkholes and other karst topography.

Peter Sinks is composed of two depressions formed this way. Three other sinkholes, South, Middle, and North, are located just east of Peter Sinks with U.S. Route 89 running through the North Sink. Erosion of these sinks was enhanced by the presence of faulting. Holocene seismicity and faulting in the Bear River Range is associated with the migration of the Yellowstone hotspot located under Yellowstone National Park, which lies to the north of the region, mainly in Wyoming.

== Climate ==
Peter Sinks, sitting at an elevation of 8,164 feet (2,488 m), is a natural limestone sinkhole (a doline) approximately one-half mile (0.80 km) wide and has no valley outlet to drain water or air. It is one of the coldest spots in the contiguous United States.

During calm, cloudless nights, this high-elevation basin dissipates daytime heat rapidly into the atmosphere. Cool, dense air can then slide downwards towards the basin floor in a process known as cold-air pooling. Consequently, extremely low temperatures can occur, particularly in the wake of arctic fronts in winter. According to the Köppen climate classification, it has a continental subalpine climate, abbreviated Dsc, though the exceptional attributes of this climate preclude one of the hallmark features of the climate type, the boreal forest, which, as Köppen based the system around vegetation distribution, indicates that Peter Sinks stretches the limits of the system.

Climate data for Peter Sinks, Utah, 2010–February 2015 average highs and lows, 2010–October 2019 average records, extremes 1985-present
| Month | Jan | Feb | Mar | Apr | May | Jun | Jul | Aug | Sep | Oct | Nov | Dec | Year |
|---|---|---|---|---|---|---|---|---|---|---|---|---|---|
| Record high °F (°C) | 49 (9) | 46 (8) | 54 (12) | 66 (19) | 70 (21) | 83 (28) | 83 (28) | 82 (28) | 77 (25) | 75 (24) | 62 (17) | 45 (7) | 83 (28) |
| Mean maximum °F (°C) | 41 (5) | 41 (5) | 49 (9) | 58 (14) | 65 (18) | 78 (26) | 82 (28) | 81 (27) | 76 (24) | 65 (18) | 51 (11) | 43 (6) | 83 (28) |
| Mean daily maximum °F (°C) | 28.7 (−1.8) | 29.1 (−1.6) | 37.5 (3.1) | 41.9 (5.5) | 50.5 (10.3) | 62.6 (17.0) | 73.8 (23.2) | 71.7 (22.1) | 63.9 (17.7) | 49.6 (9.8) | 34.4 (1.3) | 27.0 (−2.8) | 47.6 (8.7) |
| Daily mean °F (°C) | 12.3 (−10.9) | 11.4 (−11.4) | 20.4 (−6.4) | 25.9 (−3.4) | 36.1 (2.3) | 45.5 (7.5) | 54.8 (12.7) | 53.2 (11.8) | 45.4 (7.4) | 34.6 (1.4) | 20.1 (−6.6) | 11.5 (−11.4) | 30.9 (−0.6) |
| Mean daily minimum °F (°C) | −4.1 (−20.1) | −6.2 (−21.2) | 3.3 (−15.9) | 9.9 (−12.3) | 21.7 (−5.7) | 28.4 (−2.0) | 35.9 (2.2) | 34.8 (1.6) | 26.9 (−2.8) | 19.7 (−6.8) | 5.8 (−14.6) | −3.9 (−19.9) | 14.4 (−9.8) |
| Mean minimum °F (°C) | −40 (−40) | −35 (−37) | −31 (−35) | −16 (−27) | −1 (−18) | 18 (−8) | 23 (−5) | 20 (−7) | 12 (−11) | −6 (−21) | −26 (−32) | −43 (−42) | −47 (−44) |
| Record low °F (°C) | −66 (−54) | −69.3 (−56.3) | −52 (−47) | −41 (−41) | −19 (−28) | 3 (−16) | 13 (−11) | 7 (−14) | −10 (−23) | −45 (−43) | −47 (−44) | −57 (−49) | −69.3 (−56.3) |
| Average precipitation inches (mm) | 5.53 (140) | 4.97 (126) | 4.57 (116) | 3.98 (101) | 3.56 (90) | 1.74 (44) | 0.91 (23) | 1.11 (28) | 1.85 (47) | 2.94 (75) | 4.21 (107) | 5.21 (132) | 40.58 (1,031) |
Source: Oregon State University, The Weather Forums, The Washington Post (October record low)

=== Extreme cold ===
On February 1, 1985, a temperature of −69.3 °F (−56.3 °C) was recorded there, the lowest recorded temperature in Utah, and the second-lowest temperature ever recorded in the contiguous United States. The lowest recorded temperature was −69.7 °F or −56.5 °C at Rogers Pass, Montana, in 1954.

Peter Sinks' meteorological significance was discovered by Utah State University student Zane Stephens in 1983. Stephens, along with the Utah Climate Center, placed measuring instruments in the valley in the winter of 1984. On February 1, 1985, Peter Sinks dropped to −69.3 °F (−56.3 °C), while another nearby valley, Middle Sink, located 3 miles (4.8 km) to the north-east, dropped to −64 °F (−53.3 °C). Stephens hiked into Middle Sink along with Burns Israelsen to record the temperature personally. He then flew into Peter Sinks in a KUTV television station helicopter with broadcasting meteorologist Mark Eubank. State climatologist Gayle Bingham also traveled to the area and confirmed the temperature. The alcohol thermometer being used was retrieved and sent to the Bureau of Standards in Washington, D.C., to confirm the temperature.

Since 1985, Peter Sinks and Middle Sink have been studied extensively by Stephens and Tim Wright with the use of Campbell Scientific weather equipment. On January 29, 2002, and again on January 30, 2023, the temperature dropped to −62 °F (−52.2 °C) at Middle Sink. Stephens and Wright's main study is the change in temperature through the inversion at these sites. These valleys act like a dam trapping cold air, with the coldest of the air settling to the bottom of the valley. Stephens and Wright have found that temperatures between the cold air "lake" and the warmer air above the valley can differ by as much as 70 °F (39 °C).

== See also ==
- List of sinkholes of the United States
- Cold-air pool
