= Cold-air pool =

Accumulation of cold air in a topographic depression

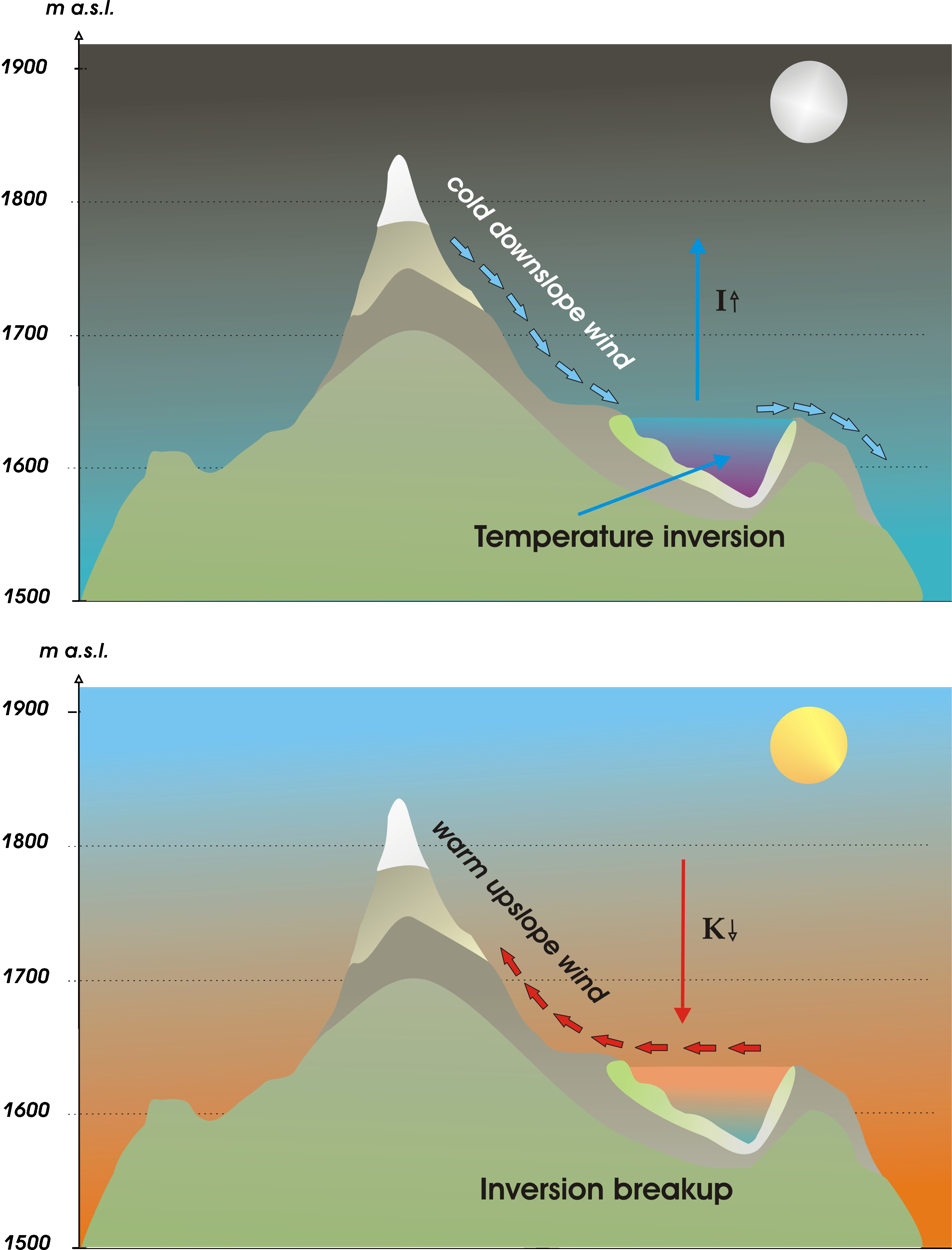
The air cools down at night and sinks (top) while daytime heating breaks the temperature inversion (bottom).

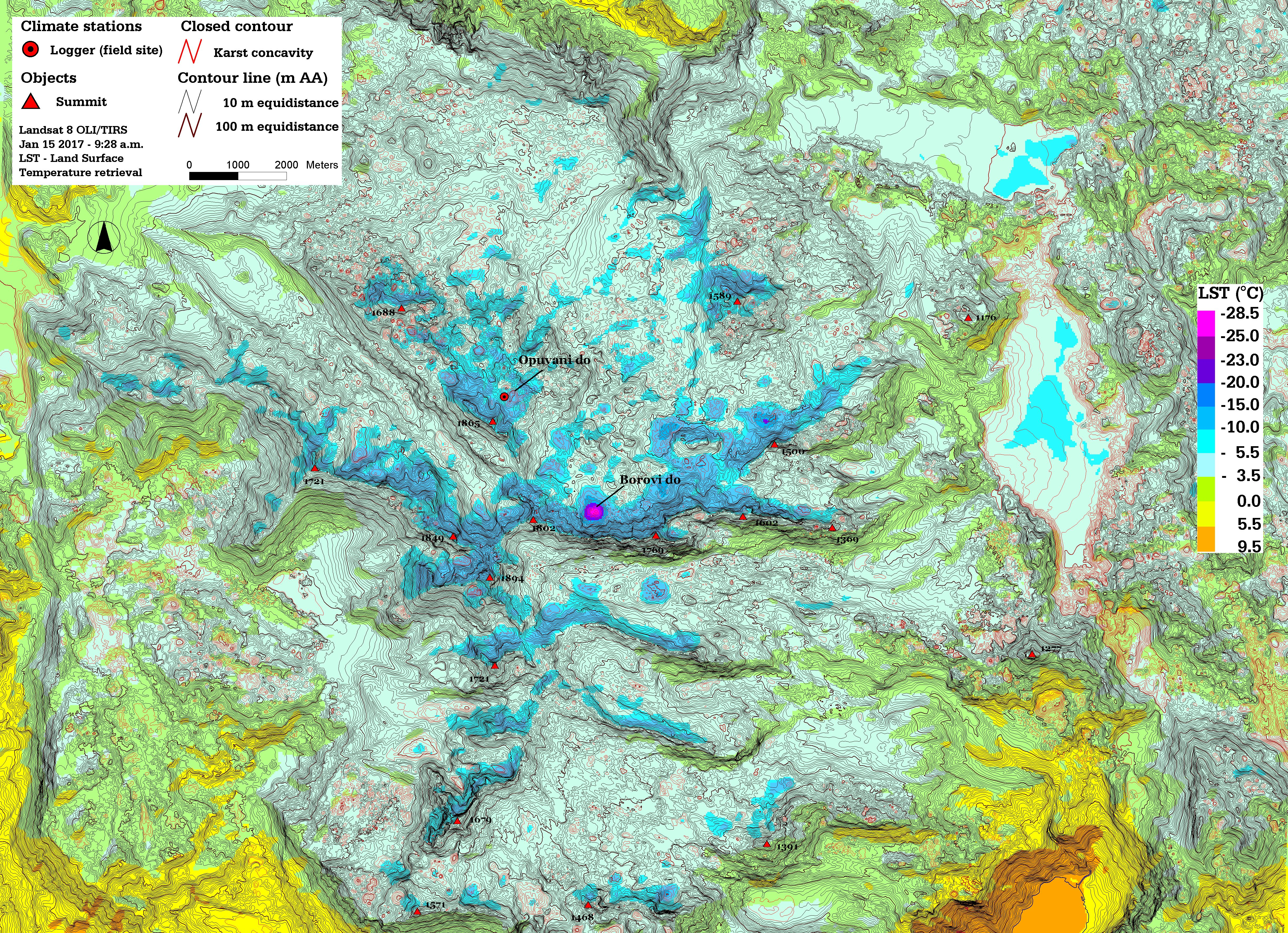
Cold-air pool on Mt Orjen during the cold-spell in January 2017 shown by a Landsat Land Surface Temperature image. Dolines collected cold air which remained also after sunrise.

A cold-air pool is an accumulation of cold air in a topographic depression, such as a valley or basin. The cold air is produced by radiative cooling at night along the slopes and sinks down, as it is denser than the surrounding air, settling at the bottom of the depression. The cold dome is trapped by the surrounding higher terrain until a change of air mass or daytime heating breaks the temperature inversion. Since the cold-air pool can persist for long periods, it leads to poor air quality and fog.

== Formation ==
Cold-air pools mostly form with a nighttime temperature inversion on clear nights and calm winds. The ground loses energy by radiation and the air in contact with it cools down by conduction until sunrise. When this process occurs on mountain slopes, the cooling air becomes denser than the air further afield and sinks downslope producing a katabatic wind. When the cold air reaches a relatively flat area or a valley, it slows down and accumulates, like water entering a lake. Above this pool (which can reach many hundreds of feet thick, depending on the geography), the air remains warmer.

Man-made barriers can also promote the formation of a cold-air pools. For example, when railways or roads traverse a slight slope horizontally, embankments can be high enough to capture cold air over a significant area.

== Impact ==
Cold-air pools have impacts on vegetation and agriculture by increasing the risk of frost.

Because of the stagnant nature of the cold-air pools, they will trap pollutants, causing serious health risks in urban areas. With the temperature inversion, rain produced at altitude by an approaching weather system will become freezing rain at the surface if the temperature in the pool is below freezing. The stagnation also reduces the electrical production of wind farms in the area.

== Observations ==
Peter Sinks is a natural sinkhole in northern Utah that is one of the coldest places in the contiguous United States. Peter Sinks is located 8,100 feet (2,500 m) above sea level, in the Bear River Mountains about 20 miles (32 km) northeast of Logan, within the Wasatch-Cache National Forest. Due to temperature inversions that trap cold nighttime air, it routinely produces the lowest temperatures in the contiguous United States. On February 1, 1985, a temperature of −56.3 °C (−69.3 °F) was recorded there, the lowest recorded temperature in Utah, and the second-lowest temperature ever recorded in the contiguous United States.

On February 7, 1991, a temperature of −52.5 °C (−62.5 °F) was registered in Lake Glattalpsee, the lowest ever temperature registered in Switzerland. The Grünloch sinkhole is considered the coldest spot in Austria, or even Central Europe. A temperature of −52.6 °C (−62.7 °F) was measured in this sinkhole on 19 February 1932.

The lowest measured temperature in Slovenia were recorded at Komna mountain karst plateau on 9 January 2009, reaching −49 °C (−56 °F).
