= Primary (LDS Church) =

Children's organization within The Church of Jesus Christ of Latter-day Saints

- The official logo, adopted in 1940
- Formation: 25 August 1878; 148 years ago
- Type: Nonprofit
- Legal status: Charity
- Purpose: Religious instruction
- Headquarters: Salt Lake City, Utah, U.S.
- Services: Religious instruction; personal standards and development; child/family support
- General President: Susan H. Porter
- First Counselor: Amy A. Wright
- Second Counselor: Tracy Y. Browning
- Main organ: General presidency and general board
- Parent organization: The Church of Jesus Christ of Latter-day Saints
- Affiliations: At age 12, students join the Young Men or Young Women
- Students: 1.1 million children aged 3–11 (2015)
- Website: churchofjesuschrist.org/callings/primary-organization
- Formerly called: Primary Association

The Primary (formerly the Primary Association) is the children's organization of the Church of Jesus Christ of Latter-day Saints (LDS Church). It acts as a Sunday school organization for the church's children (ages 3–11). (Note: Although children had, by long-standing practice, participated in Primary until their 12th birthdays, on December 14, 2018, the First Presidency announced that children would advance from Primary as a group in January of the year in which they would turn 12.)

== Purpose, objectives, and theme ==
The official purpose of Primary is to help parents in teaching their children to learn and live the gospel of Jesus Christ. The official objectives of Primary are to:

- Teach children that they are children of God and that Heavenly Father and Jesus Christ love them;
- help children learn to love Heavenly Father and Jesus Christ;
- help children prepare to be baptized, to receive the Holy Ghost, and to keep their baptismal covenants;
- help children grow in their understanding of the gospel plan and provide opportunities for them to live gospel principles;
- help boys prepare to receive the priesthood and be worthy to use this power to bless and serve others; and
- help girls prepare to be righteous young women, understand the blessings of the priesthood and the temple, and serve others.

The Primary theme is "All thy children shall be taught of the Lord; and great shall be the peace of thy children" (Isaiah 54:13).

== Format ==
While Primary classes will differ slightly in different regions, most meetings are standardized. For the second half of Primary, children are separated into age groups with names for each group (see below).

Where participants, classrooms or teachers are limited, multiple age-grouped classes may be taught together. In most congregations, Primary classes are co-ed.

Primary begins with a prayer, scripture (or Article of Faith), and a short talk, all of these given by Primary children. About 20 minutes are then spent on music, primarily from the Children's Songbook. After music time, children are then sent to their individual classes where they are taught lessons from Come, Follow Me - For Primary.

=== Class names ===
The names of the classes in Primary have varied over time. The following is a partial list of names that have been applied to different age groups in Primary. In January 2010, the names of the classes were changed to the age of children entering the class, i.e., 4-year-olds are in the class CTR 4. Previously, names were indicative of the age children would turn the coming year, (4-year-olds in CTR 5).

Age (on January 1)	Present class name	Past class names
3	Sunbeams	Moonbeams
4	CTR 4	Sunbeams; Stars; CTR 5
5	CTR 5	Stars; CTR 6
6	CTR 6	Rainbows; CTR 7
7	CTR 7	Zion’s Boys; Zion’s Girls; CTR Pilots; Co-Pilots; Top Pilots; Targeteers; CTRs; CTR 8
8	Valiant 8	Zion’s Boys; Zion’s Girls; CTR Pilots; Co-Pilots; Beacons; Top Pilots; Targeteers; CTRs; Valiant 9
9	Valiant 9	Girls: Larks; Gaynotes; Home Builders; Lihomas; Merry Miss; Valiant 10; Boys: Hatchets; Trail Builders; Blazers; Valiant 10
10	Valiant 10	Girls: Bluebirds; Firelights; Hearths; Home Builders; Lihomas; Merry Miss; Valiant 11; Boys: Wagon Wheels; Trail Builders; Trekkers; Valiant 11
11	Valiant 11	Girls: Bluebirds; Merrihands; Home Builders; Lihomas; Merry Miss; Valiant 12; Boys: Arrows; Guides; Trail Builders; Blazers; Valiant 12
12+	See Young Women	Seagulls; Home Builders; Lihomas; Mi-kan-wees

== Nursery ==
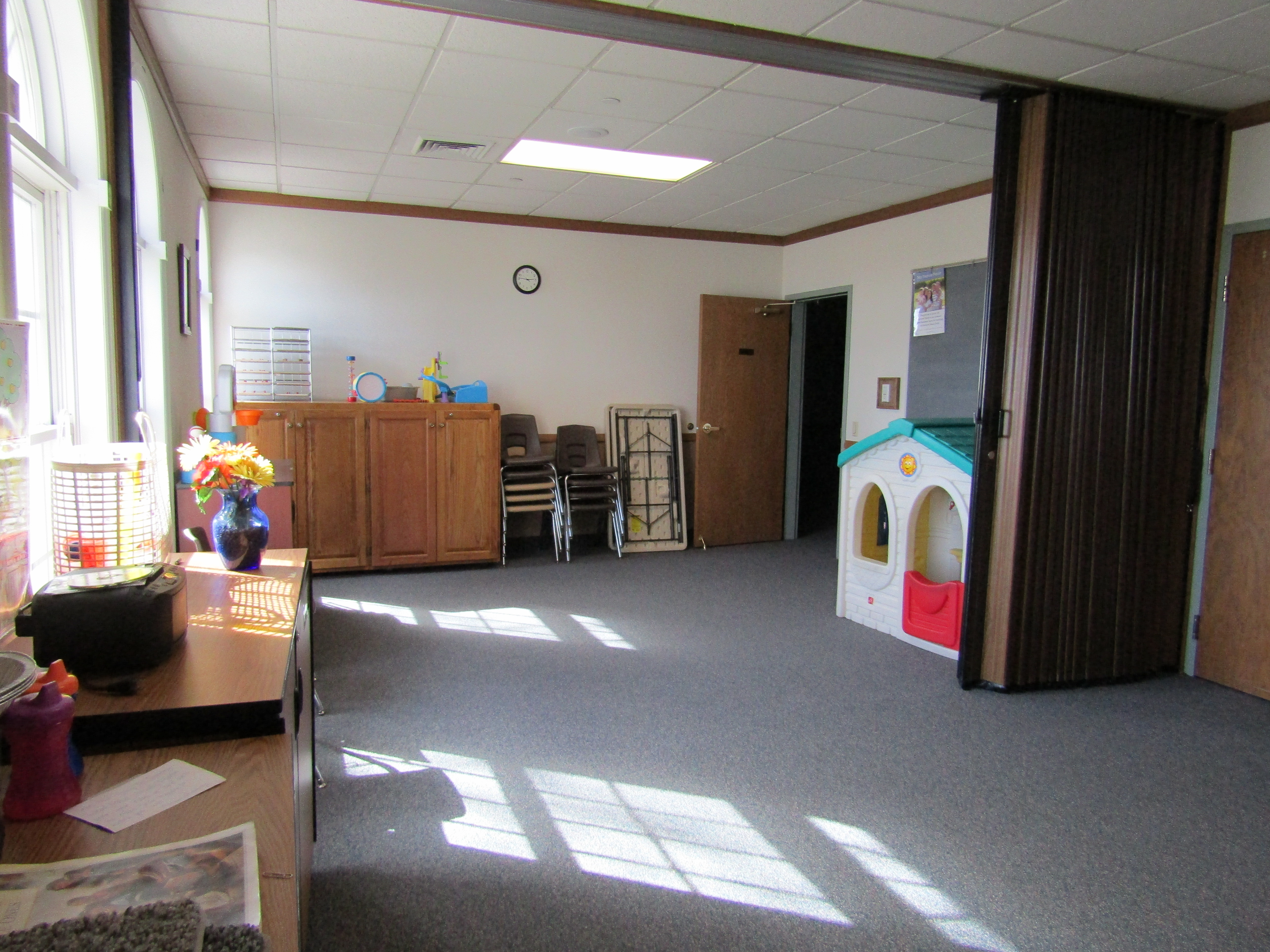
A typical Nursery classroom

A separate class, known as nursery, is held for children ages 18 months to 3. It is led under the direction of the Primary presidency by at least two people, a nursery leader and assistant nursery leader(s). Nursery leaders are required to be the same gender unless they are married.

Nursery classes have a lesson, free play time, snack time, and music time primarily using the Children's Songbook. Additionally, two prayers are given by children with help from the adult leaders. While no particular order is required, it is recommended that the order be the same every week.

Teachers use the Behold Your Little Ones: Nursery Manual for lesson plans and other resources.

== History ==
Primary was first organized in 1878 by Aurelia Spencer Rogers in Farmington, Utah, and adopted church-wide in 1880 under the direction of Louie B. Felt, who served as the president of the organization through 1925. Rogers was concerned because younger Latter-day Saint children had too much unsupervised time due to the long hours that fathers and older sons kept on the farms and mothers and older daughters in the home. In particular, Rogers felt that the younger boys in the community were becoming unruly and mischievous. With permission from church leaders and under the initial direction of General Relief Society President Eliza R. Snow, Rogers organized a Primary Association for her local Farmington congregation on August 11, 1878. Two weeks later, the first meeting was held on August 28, with 215 children in attendance. That day, boys were specifically taught not to steal fruit from orchards and girls were taught not to hang on wagons. In addition, they were given lessons on faith, manners, obedience, and other principles.

May Anderson, the Primary general president from 1925 to 1939, initiated what became Primary Children's Hospital in Salt Lake City (now part of Intermountain Health). Anderson also helped establish kindergartens in Utah. In the 1970s, as a result of the Priesthood Correlation Program, the Primary Association was renamed "Primary".

Beginning in April 2021, Camille N. Johnson was the Primary General President, with Susan H. Porter as First Counselor and Amy Wright as Second Counselor.

In the church's April 2022 general conference, it was announced that Johnson would become the new Relief Society General President on August 1, 2022. As a result, on that date, Porter became the new Primary General President, with Wright serving as First Counselor and Tracy Y. Browning as Second Counselor.

=== Chronology of the general presidency of the Primary ===
No.	Dates	General President	First Counselor	Second Counselor
1	1880–1925	Louie B. Felt	Matilda M. Barratt (1880–88)	Clara C. M. Cannon (1880–95)
1	1880–1925	Louie B. Felt	Lillie T. Freeze (1888–1905)	Josephine R. West (1896–1905)
1	1880–1925	Louie B. Felt	May Anderson (1905–25)	Clara W. Beebe (1906–25)
2	1925–1939	May Anderson	Sadie Grant Pack (1925–29)	Isabelle S. Ross (1925–29)
2	1925–1939	May Anderson	Isabelle S. Ross (1929–39)	Edna Harker Thomas (1929–33)
2	1925–1939	May Anderson	Isabelle S. Ross (1929–39)	Edith E. H. Lambert (1933–39)
3	1940–1943	May Green Hinckley	Adele C. Howells	Janet M. Thompson (1940–42)
3	1940–1943	May Green Hinckley	Adele C. Howells	LaVern W. Parmley (1942–43)
4	1943–1951	Adele C. Howells	LaVern W. Parmley	Dessie G. Boyle
5	1951–1974	LaVern W. Parmley	Arta M. Hale (1951–62)	Florence H. Richards (1951–53)
5	1951–1974	LaVern W. Parmley	Arta M. Hale (1951–62)	Leone W. Doxey (1953–62)
5	1951–1974	LaVern W. Parmley	Leone W. Doxey (1962–69)	Eileen R. Dunyon (1962–63)
5	1951–1974	LaVern W. Parmley	Leone W. Doxey (1962–69)	Lucile C. Reading (1963–70)
5	1951–1974	LaVern W. Parmley	Lucile C. Reading (1970)	Florence R. Lane (1970–74)
5	1951–1974	LaVern W. Parmley	Naomi W. Randall (1970–74)	Florence R. Lane (1970–74)
6	1974–1980	Naomi M. Shumway	Sarah B. Paulsen (1974–77)	Colleen B. Lemmon (1974–77)
6	1974–1980	Naomi M. Shumway	Colleen B. Lemmon (1977–80)	Dorthea C. Murdock (1977–80)
7	1980–1988	Dwan J. Young	Virginia B. Cannon	Michaelene P. Grassli
8	1988—1994	Michaelene P. Grassli	Betty Jo N. Jepsen	Ruth B. Wright
9	1994–1999	Patricia P. Pinegar	Anne G. Wirthlin	Susan L. Warner
10	1999–2005	Coleen K. Menlove	Sydney S. Reynolds	Gayle M. Clegg
11	2005–2010	Cheryl C. Lant	Margaret S. Lifferth	Vicki F. Matsumori
12	2010–2016	Rosemary M. Wixom	Jean A. Stevens (2010–15)	Cheryl A. Esplin (2010–15)
12	2010–2016	Rosemary M. Wixom	Cheryl A. Esplin (2015–16)	Mary R. Durham (2015–16)
13	2016–2021	Joy D. Jones	Jean B. Bingham (2016–17)	Bonnie H. Cordon (2016–17)
13	2016–2021	Joy D. Jones	Bonnie H. Cordon (2017–18)	Cristina B. Franco (2017-21)
13	2016–2021	Joy D. Jones	Lisa L. Harkness (2018-21)	Cristina B. Franco (2017-21)
14	2021–2022	Camille N. Johnson (Note: Johnson's term of service ended on August 1, 2022.)	Susan H. Porter	Amy A. Wright
15	2022–2026	Susan H. Porter (Note: Porter's term of service began on August 1, 2022.)	Amy A. Wright	Tracy Y. Browning
15	2026-present	Rosemary K. Chibota	Nina M. Garfield	Theresa A. Collins

== Primary in the church today ==
Primary provides Sunday teachings and church-related activities to approximately 1.1 million Latter-day Saint children. In most congregations, a nursery class is available for children from 18 months to age 3. Classroom instruction begins for three-year-olds and continues to age 11, with classes grouped by age. At the beginning of the year they turn 12, children begin to attend Sunday School and the Young Men or Young Women programs. The Primary has its own songbook, made up of original songs and hymns modified for children.

== Child safety ==
All members called to serve in a position that deals with youth or children are required to take the Church's "Protecting Children and Youth" training module which is provided on the church's website.

Nursery and Primary leaders are required to release children only to members of their immediate families unless permission has been granted for someone else to pick the child up.

== See also ==
- CTR ring
- I Am a Child of God
- The Friend (LDS magazine)
